= 1993–94 NCAA Division I men's basketball season =

Basketball season

- Preseason AP No. 1: North Carolina Tar Heels
- Regular season: November 1993 – April 1994
- NCAA Tournament: 1994
- Tournament dates: March 17 – April 4, 1994
- National Championship: Charlotte Coliseum; Charlotte, North Carolina
- NCAA Champions: Arkansas Razorbacks
- Other champions: Villanova Wildcats (NIT)
- Player of the Year (Naismith, Wooden): Glenn Robinson, Purdue Boilermakers

The 1993–94 NCAA Division I men's basketball season began in November 1993 and concluded in the 64-team 1994 NCAA Division I men's basketball tournament, whose finals were held at the Charlotte Coliseum in Charlotte, North Carolina. The Arkansas Razorbacks earned their first national championship by defeating the Duke Blue Devils 76–72 on April 4, 1994. The Razorbacks were coached by Nolan Richardson and the NCAA Division I basketball tournament Most Outstanding Player was Arkansas's Corliss Williamson.

In championship game of the 32-team 1994 National Invitation Tournament, the Villanova Wildcats defeated the Vanderbilt Commodores at Madison Square Garden in New York City.

Following the season, the 1994 NCAA Men's Basketball All-American Consensus First Team included Grant Hill, Jason Kidd, Donyell Marshall, Glenn Robinson, and Clifford Rozier.

== Season headlines ==
- Nolan Richardson led the Arkansas Razorbacks to their first national championship, also his first.
- The East Coast Conference resumed conference play after a one-season hiatus. However, it disbanded at the end of the season.

== Major rule changes ==
Beginning in 1993–94, the following rules changes were implemented:

- The shot clock was shortened from 45 seconds to 35 seconds per possession
- The game clock stopped on any made field goal with under one minute remaining in the second half and any overtime period(s)

== Pre-season polls ==
The top 25 from the pre-season AP and Coaches Polls.

Associated Press
Ranking	Team
1	North Carolina
2	Kentucky
3	Arkansas
4	Duke
5	Michigan
6	California
7	Louisville
8	Temple
9	Kansas
10	Minnesota
11	Oklahoma State
12	Indiana
13	UCLA
14	Georgia Tech
15	Georgetown
16	Virginia
17	Illinois
18	Arizona
19	Cincinnati
20	Syracuse
21	Purdue
22	Massachusetts
23	Vanderbilt
24	George Washington
25	Florida State

Coaches
Ranking	Team
1	North Carolina
2	Kentucky
3	Duke
4	Arkansas
5	Michigan
6	Louisville
7	Indiana
7	Temple
9	Kansas
10	California
11	Minnesota
12	Georgetown
13	Oklahoma State
14	UCLA
15	Georgia Tech
16	Illinois
17	Cincinnati
18	Virginia
19	Syracuse
20	Arizona
21	Massachusetts
22	Wisconsin
23	Marquette
24	Florida State
25	Purdue

== Conference membership changes ==
These schools joined new conferences for the 1993–94 season.

School	Former conference	New conference
Buffalo Bulls	NCAA Division I independent	East Coast Conference
Central Connecticut State Blue Devils	NCAA Division I independent	East Coast Conference
Chicago State Cougars	NCAA Division I independent	East Coast Conference
Dayton Flyers	Midwestern Collegiate Conference	Great Midwest Conference
Duquesne Dukes	Midwestern Collegiate Conference	Atlantic 10 Conference
Florida Atlantic (FAU) Owls	NCAA Division II independent	Trans America Athletic Conference
Hofstra Flying Dutchmen	NCAA Division I independent	East Coast Conference
UW-Milwaukee Panthers	NCAA Division I independent	Mid-Continent Conference
Northeastern Illinois Golden Eagles	NCAA Division I independent	East Coast Conference
Oral Roberts Golden Eagles	NAIA independent	NCAA Division I independent
Troy State Trojans	NCAA Division II independent	East Coast Conference

== Regular season ==
=== Conferences ===
==== Conference winners and tournaments ====
Thirty conferences concluded their seasons with a single-elimination tournament, with only the Big Ten Conference, Ivy League, and Pac-10 Conference choosing not to conduct conference tournaments. Conference tournament winners, with the exception of those of the East Coast Conference, Great Midwest Conference, and Midwestern Collegiate Conference, received an automatic bid to the 1994 NCAA tournament.

Conference	Regular season winner	Conference player of the year	Conference tournament	Tournament venue (City)	Tournament winner
Atlantic 10 Conference	UMass	Eddie Jones, Temple	1994 Atlantic 10 men's basketball tournament	Mullins Center (Amherst, Massachusetts)	UMass
Atlantic Coast Conference	Duke	Grant Hill, Duke	1994 ACC men's basketball tournament	Charlotte Coliseum (Charlotte, North Carolina)	North Carolina
Big East Conference	Connecticut	Donyell Marshall, Connecticut	1994 Big East men's basketball tournament	Madison Square Garden (New York City, New York)	Providence
Big Eight Conference	Missouri	Melvin Booker, Missouri	1994 Big Eight Conference men's basketball tournament	Kemper Arena (Kansas City, Missouri)	Nebraska
Big Sky Conference	Idaho State; Weber State	Ruben Nembhard, Weber State	1994 Big Sky Conference men's basketball tournament	BSU Pavilion (Boise, Idaho)	Boise State
Big South Conference	Towson State	Joe Spinks, Campbell	1994 Big South Conference men's basketball tournament	North Charleston Coliseum (North Charleston, South Carolina)	Liberty
Big Ten Conference	Purdue	Glenn Robinson, Purdue	No Tournament		
Big West Conference	New Mexico State	Kebu Stewart, UNLV	1994 Big West Conference men's basketball tournament	Thomas & Mack Center (Paradise, Nevada)	New Mexico State
Colonial Athletic Association	James Madison; Old Dominion	Odell Hodge, Old Dominion	1994 CAA men's basketball tournament	Richmond Coliseum (Richmond, Virginia)	James Madison
East Coast Conference	Troy State	Reggie Smith, Northeastern Illinois	1994 East Coast Conference men's basketball tournament	Alumni Arena (Amherst, New York)	Hofstra
Great Midwest Conference	Marquette	Jim McIlvaine, Marquette	1994 Great Midwest Conference men's basketball tournament	Shoemaker Center (Cincinnati, Ohio)	Cincinnati
Ivy League	Penn	Jerome Allen, Penn	No Tournament		
Metro Conference	Louisville	Clifford Rozier, Louisville	1994 Metro Conference men's basketball tournament	Mississippi Coast Coliseum (Biloxi, Mississippi)	Louisville
Metro Atlantic Athletic Conference	Canisius	Doremus Bennerman, Siena	1994 MAAC men's basketball tournament	Knickerbocker Arena (Albany, New York)	Loyola (MD)
Mid-American Conference	Ohio	Gary Trent, Ohio	1994 MAC men's basketball tournament	Battelle Hall (Columbus, Ohio)	Ohio
Mid-Continent Conference	Green Bay	Kenny Williams, UIC	1994 Mid-Continent Conference men's basketball tournament	Rosemont Horizon (Rosemont, Illinois)	Green Bay
Mid-Eastern Athletic Conference	Coppin State	Stephen Stewart, Coppin State	1994 MEAC men's basketball tournament	Talmadge L. Hill Field House (Baltimore, Maryland)	North Carolina A&T
Midwestern Collegiate Conference	Xavier	Brian Grant, Xavier	1994 MCC men's basketball tournament	Hinkle Fieldhouse (Indianapolis, Indiana)	Detroit
Missouri Valley Conference	Southern Illinois; Tulsa	Gary Collier, Tulsa	1994 Missouri Valley Conference men's basketball tournament	St. Louis Arena (St. Louis, Missouri)	Southern Illinois
North Atlantic Conference	Drexel	Scott Drapeau, New Hampshire	1994 North Atlantic Conference men's basketball tournament	Daskalakis Athletic Center (Philadelphia, Pennsylvania)	Drexel
Northeast Conference	Rider	Izett Buchanan, Marist	1994 Northeast Conference men's basketball tournament	Alumni Gymnasium (Lawrenceville, New Jersey)	Rider
Ohio Valley Conference	Murray State	Carlos Rogers, Tennessee State	1994 Ohio Valley Conference men's basketball tournament	Nashville Municipal Auditorium (Nashville, Tennessee)	Tennessee State
Pacific-10 Conference	Arizona	Jason Kidd, California	No Tournament		
Patriot League	Colgate; Fordham; Holy Cross; Navy	Tucker Neale, Colgate	1994 Patriot League men's basketball tournament	Alumni Hall (Annapolis, Maryland)	Navy
Southeastern Conference	Florida (East); Kentucky (East); Arkansas (West)	Corliss Williamson, Arkansas	1994 SEC men's basketball tournament	The Pyramid (Memphis, Tennessee)	Kentucky
Southern Conference	Chattanooga	Chad Copeland, Chattanooga; Frankie King, Western Carolina	1994 Southern Conference men's basketball tournament	Asheville Civic Center (Asheville, North Carolina)	Chattanooga
Southland Conference	Northeast Louisiana	Eric Kubel, Northwestern State	1994 Southland Conference men's basketball tournament	Fant–Ewing Coliseum (Monroe, Louisiana)	Southwest Texas State
Southwest Conference	Texas	B. J. Tyler, Texas	1994 Southwest Conference men's basketball tournament	Reunion Arena (Dallas, Texas)	Texas
Southwestern Athletic Conference	Texas Southern	Jervaughn Scales, Southern	1994 SWAC men's basketball tournament	—	Texas Southern
Sun Belt Conference	Western Kentucky	Michael Allen, Southwestern Louisiana	1994 Sun Belt men's basketball tournament	E. A. Diddle Arena (Bowling Green, Kentucky)	Southwestern Louisiana
Trans America Athletic Conference	College of Charleston	Marion Busby, College of Charleston	1994 TAAC men's basketball tournament	UCF Arena (Orlando, Florida)	UCF
West Coast Conference	Gonzaga	Jeff Brown, Gonzaga	1994 West Coast Conference men's basketball tournament	Toso Pavilion (Santa Clara, California)	Pepperdine
Western Athletic Conference	New Mexico	Greg Brown, New Mexico	1994 WAC men's basketball tournament	Delta Center (Salt Lake City, Utah)	Hawaii

==== Conference standings ====
1993–94 ACC men's basketball standings
	Conf.				Overall
Team	W		L	PCT	W		L	PCT
No. 6 Duke	12	–	4	.750	28	–	6	.824
No. 1 North Carolina †	11	–	5	.688	28	–	7	.800
Wake Forest	9	–	7	.563	21	–	12	.636
Virginia	8	–	8	.500	18	–	13	.581
Maryland	8	–	8	.500	18	–	12	.600
Georgia Tech	7	–	9	.438	16	–	13	.552
Florida State	6	–	10	.375	13	–	14	.481
Clemson	6	–	10	.375	18	–	16	.529
NC State	5	–	11	.313	11	–	19	.367
† 1994 ACC tournament winner Rankings from AP poll

1993–94 Atlantic 10 men's basketball standings
	Conf.				Overall
Team	W		L	PCT	W		L	PCT
No. 8 UMass †	14	–	2	.875	28	–	7	.800
No. 12 Temple	12	–	4	.750	23	–	8	.742
George Washington	8	–	8	.500	18	–	12	.600
West Virginia	8	–	8	.500	17	–	12	.586
Duquesne	8	–	8	.500	17	–	13	.567
Rhode Island	7	–	9	.438	11	–	16	.407
Rutgers	6	–	10	.375	11	–	16	.407
Saint Joseph's	5	–	11	.313	14	–	14	.500
St. Bonaventure	4	–	12	.250	10	–	17	.370
† 1994 Atlantic 10 Tournament winner Rankings from AP Poll

1993–94 Big East men's basketball standings
	Conf.				Overall
Team	W		L	PCT	W		L	PCT
No. 4 Connecticut	16	–	2	.889	29	–	5	.853
No. 15 Syracuse	13	–	5	.722	23	–	7	.767
Boston College	11	–	7	.611	23	–	11	.676
Providence †	10	–	8	.556	20	–	10	.667
Villanova	10	–	8	.556	20	–	12	.625
Georgetown	10	–	8	.556	19	–	12	.613
Seton Hall	8	–	10	.444	17	–	13	.567
Pittsburgh	7	–	11	.389	13	–	14	.481
St. John's	5	–	13	.278	12	–	17	.414
Miami	0	–	18	.000	7	–	20	.259
† 1994 Big East tournament winner As of April 4, 1994; Rankings from AP poll

1993–94 Big Eight Conference men's basketball standings
	Conf.				Overall
Team	W		L	PCT	W		L	PCT
No. 5 Missouri	14	–	0	1.000	28	–	4	.875
No. 19 Oklahoma State	10	–	4	.714	24	–	10	.706
No. 13 Kansas	9	–	5	.643	27	–	8	.771
No. 22 Nebraska †	7	–	7	.500	20	–	10	.667
Oklahoma	6	–	8	.429	15	–	13	.536
Kansas State	4	–	10	.286	20	–	14	.588
Iowa State	4	–	10	.286	14	–	13	.519
Colorado	2	–	12	.143	10	–	17	.370
† 1994 Big Eight tournament winner As of April 4, 1994; Rankings from AP poll

1993–94 Big Sky men's basketball standings
	Conf.				Overall
Team	W		L	PCT	W		L	PCT
Weber State	10	–	4	.714	20	–	10	.667
Idaho State	10	–	4	.714	18	–	9	.667
Idaho	9	–	5	.643	18	–	10	.643
Montana State	8	–	6	.571	16	–	11	.593
Boise State †	7	–	7	.500	17	–	13	.567
Montana	6	–	8	.429	19	–	9	.679
Northern Arizona	6	–	8	.429	13	–	13	.500
Eastern Washington	0	–	14	.000	5	–	21	.192
† Conference tournament winner

1993–94 Big South Conference men's basketball standings
	Conf.				Overall
Team	W		L	PCT	W		L	PCT
Towson State	15	–	3	.833	21	–	9	.700
Radford	13	–	5	.722	20	–	8	.714
Campbell	13	–	5	.722	20	–	9	.690
Liberty †	12	–	6	.667	18	–	12	.600
UNC Greensboro	11	–	7	.611	15	–	12	.556
Coastal Carolina	10	–	8	.556	15	–	11	.577
Charleston Southern	7	–	11	.389	9	–	18	.333
UMBC	5	–	13	.278	6	–	21	.222
Winthrop	3	–	15	.167	4	–	23	.148
UNC Asheville	3	–	15	.167	3	–	24	.111
† 1994 Big South tournament winner Rankings from AP Poll

1993–94 Big Ten Conference men's basketball standings
	Conf.				Overall
Team	W		L	PCT	W		L	PCT
No. 3 Purdue	14	–	4	.778	29	–	5	.853
No. 11 Michigan	13	–	5	.722	24	–	8	.750
No. 18 Indiana	12	–	6	.667	21	–	9	.700
No. 23 Minnesota	10	–	8	.556	21	–	12	.636
Michigan State	10	–	8	.556	20	–	12	.625
Illinois	10	–	8	.556	17	–	11	.607
Wisconsin	8	–	10	.444	18	–	11	.621
Penn State	6	–	12	.333	13	–	14	.481
Ohio State	6	–	12	.333	13	–	16	.448
Northwestern	5	–	13	.278	15	–	14	.517
Iowa	5	–	13	.278	11	–	16	.407
Rankings from AP Poll; *Minnesota vacated all NCAA tournament games due to sanctions against the program. Disputed record (22-13)

1993–94 Big West men's basketball standings
	Conf.				Overall
Team	W		L	PCT	W		L	PCT
New Mexico State †	12	–	6	.667	23	–	8	.742
Long Beach State	11	–	7	.611	17	–	10	.630
San Jose State	11	–	7	.611	15	–	12	.556
Utah State	11	–	7	.611	14	–	13	.519
Pacific	10	–	8	.556	17	–	14	.548
UNLV	10	–	8	.556	15	–	13	.536
UC Santa Barbara	9	–	9	.500	13	–	17	.433
Nevada	6	–	12	.333	11	–	17	.393
Cal State Fullerton	6	–	12	.333	8	–	19	.296
UC Irvine	4	–	14	.222	10	–	20	.333
† 1994 Big West tournament winner Rankings from AP poll

1993–94 CAA men's basketball standings
	Conf.				Overall
Team	W		L	PCT	W		L	PCT
Old Dominion	10	–	4	.714	21	–	10	.677
James Madison †	10	–	4	.714	20	–	10	.667
UNC Wilmington	9	–	5	.643	18	–	10	.643
Richmond	8	–	6	.571	14	–	14	.500
East Carolina	7	–	7	.500	15	–	12	.556
George Mason	5	–	9	.357	10	–	17	.370
American	5	–	9	.357	8	–	19	.296
William & Mary	2	–	12	.143	4	–	23	.148
† 1994 CAA tournament winner Rankings from AP Poll

1993–94 East Coast Conference men's basketball standings
	Conf.				Overall
Team	W		L	PCT	W		L	PCT
Troy State	5	–	0	1.000	13	–	14	.481
Northeastern Illinois	4	–	1	.800	17	–	11	.607
Buffalo	3	–	2	.600	10	–	18	.357
Chicago State	2	–	3	.400	4	–	23	.148
Hofstra†	1	–	4	.200	9	–	20	.310
Central Connecticut State	0	–	5	.000	4	–	22	.154
† 1994 ECC tournament winner Rankings from AP Poll

1993–94 Great Midwest Conference men's basketball standings
	Conf.				Overall
Team	W		L	PCT	W		L	PCT
No. 21 Marquette	10	–	2	.833	24	–	9	.727
No. 24 Saint Louis	8	–	4	.667	23	–	6	.793
UAB	8	–	4	.667	22	–	8	.733
No. 25 Cincinnati †	7	–	5	.583	22	–	10	.688
DePaul	4	–	8	.333	16	–	12	.571
Memphis State	4	–	8	.333	13	–	16	.448
Dayton	1	–	11	.083	6	–	21	.222
† 1994 GMC tournament winner Rankings from AP Poll

1993–94 Ivy League men's basketball standings
	Conf.				Overall
Team	W		L	PCT	W		L	PCT
Penn	14	–	0	1.000	25	–	3	.893
Princeton	11	–	3	.786	18	–	8	.692
Yale	7	–	7	.500	10	–	16	.385
Brown	6	–	8	.429	12	–	14	.462
Dartmouth	6	–	8	.429	10	–	16	.385
Harvard	5	–	9	.357	9	–	17	.346
Columbia	4	–	10	.286	6	–	20	.231
Cornell	3	–	11	.214	8	–	18	.308
Rankings from AP Poll

1993–94 Metro Conference men's basketball standings
	Conf.				Overall
Team	W		L	PCT	W		L	PCT
No. 10 Louisville †	10	–	2	.833	28	–	6	.824
Tulane	7	–	5	.583	18	–	11	.621
Charlotte	7	–	5	.583	16	–	13	.552
Virginia Tech	6	–	6	.500	18	–	10	.643
VCU	5	–	7	.417	14	–	13	.519
Southern Miss	5	–	7	.417	15	–	15	.500
South Florida	2	–	10	.167	10	–	17	.370
† 1994 Metro Conference tournament winner Rankings from AP Poll

1993–94 MAAC men's basketball standings
	Conf.				Overall
Team	W		L	PCT	W		L	PCT
Canisius	12	–	2	.857	22	–	7	.759
Manhattan	10	–	4	.714	19	–	11	.633
Siena	10	–	4	.714	25	–	8	.758
Saint Peter's	8	–	6	.571	14	–	13	.519
Loyola (MD) †	6	–	8	.429	17	–	13	.567
Fairfield	4	–	10	.286	8	–	19	.296
Iona	3	–	11	.214	7	–	20	.259
Niagara	3	–	11	.214	6	–	21	.222
† 1994 MAAC tournament winner Rankings from AP Poll

1993–94 Mid-American Conference men's basketball standings
	Conf.				Overall
Team	W		L	PCT	W		L	PCT
Ohio †	14	–	4	.778	25	–	8	.758
Bowling Green	12	–	6	.667	18	–	10	.643
Miami (OH)	12	–	6	.667	19	–	11	.633
Ball State	11	–	7	.611	16	–	12	.571
Toledo	10	–	8	.556	15	–	12	.556
Eastern Michigan	10	–	8	.556	15	–	12	.556
Kent State	8	–	10	.444	13	–	14	.481
Western Michigan	7	–	11	.389	14	–	14	.500
Central Michigan	4	–	14	.222	5	–	21	.192
Akron	2	–	16	.111	8	–	18	.308
† 1994 MAC tournament winner Rankings from AP Poll

1993–94 Mid-Continent Conference men's basketball standings
	Conf.				Overall
Team	W		L	PCT	W		L	PCT
Wisconsin–Green Bay †	15	–	3	.833	27	–	7	.794
Illinois–Chicago	14	–	4	.778	20	–	9	.690
Valparaiso	14	–	4	.778	20	–	8	.714
Cleveland State	9	–	9	.500	14	–	15	.483
Wright State	9	–	9	.500	12	–	18	.400
Eastern Illinois	7	–	11	.389	12	–	15	.444
Northern Illinois	7	–	11	.389	10	–	17	.370
Wisconsin–Milwaukee	7	–	11	.389	10	–	17	.370
Western Illinois	5	–	13	.278	7	–	20	.259
Youngstown State	3	–	15	.167	5	–	21	.192
† 1994 Mid-Con Tournament winner Rankings from AP Poll

1993–94 MEAC men's basketball standings
	Conf.				Overall
Team	W		L	PCT	W		L	PCT
Coppin State	16	–	0	1.000	22	–	8	.733
Maryland Eastern Shore	10	–	6	.625	16	–	12	.571
South Carolina State	10	–	6	.625	16	–	13	.552
North Carolina A&T †	10	–	6	.625	16	–	14	.533
Bethune–Cookman	8	–	8	.500	9	–	18	.333
Howard	7	–	9	.438	10	–	17	.370
Delaware State	5	–	11	.313	8	–	19	.296
Morgan State	4	–	12	.250	8	–	21	.276
Florida A&M	2	–	14	.125	4	–	23	.148
† 1994 MEAC tournament winner Rankings from AP Poll

1993–94 Midwestern Collegiate Conference men's basketball standings
	Conf.				Overall
Team	W		L	PCT	W		L	PCT
Xavier	8	–	2	.800	22	–	8	.733
Evansville	6	–	4	.600	21	–	11	.656
Butler	6	–	4	.600	16	–	13	.552
Detroit Mercy †	5	–	5	.500	16	–	13	.552
La Salle	4	–	6	.400	11	–	16	.407
Loyola (IL)	1	–	9	.100	8	–	19	.296
† 1994 MCC tournament winner Rankings from AP Poll

1993–94 Missouri Valley Conference men's basketball standings
	Conf.				Overall
Team	W		L	PCT	W		L	PCT
Tulsa	15	–	3	.833	23	–	8	.742
Bradley	14	–	4	.778	23	–	8	.742
Southern Illinois †	14	–	4	.778	23	–	7	.767
Illinois State	12	–	6	.667	16	–	11	.593
Northern Iowa	10	–	8	.556	16	–	13	.552
Southwest Missouri State	7	–	11	.389	12	–	15	.444
Wichita State	6	–	12	.333	9	–	18	.333
Drake	6	–	12	.333	11	–	16	.407
Creighton	3	–	15	.167	7	–	22	.241
Indiana State	3	–	15	.167	4	–	22	.154
† 1994 MVC tournament winner Rankings from AP Poll

1993–94 North Atlantic Conference men's basketball standings
	Conf.				Overall
Team	W		L	PCT	W		L	PCT
Drexel †	12	–	2	.857	25	–	5	.833
Maine	11	–	3	.786	20	–	9	.690
Hartford	9	–	5	.643	16	–	12	.571
New Hampshire	8	–	6	.571	15	–	13	.536
Delaware	7	–	7	.500	14	–	13	.519
Boston University	4	–	10	.286	11	–	16	.407
Vermont	3	–	11	.214	12	–	15	.444
Northeastern	2	–	12	.143	5	–	22	.185
† 1994 NAC tournament winner Rankings from AP poll

1993–94 Northeast Conference men's basketball standings
	Conf.				Overall
Team	W		L	PCT	W		L	PCT
Rider †	14	–	4	.778	21	–	9	.700
Monmouth	13	–	5	.722	18	–	11	.621
Robert Morris	11	–	7	.611	14	–	14	.500
Wagner	11	–	7	.611	16	–	12	.571
Fairleigh Dickinson	10	–	8	.556	14	–	13	.519
Marist	10	–	8	.556	14	–	13	.519
Mount St. Mary's	9	–	9	.500	13	–	15	.464
Saint Francis (PA)	9	–	9	.500	13	–	15	.464
Long Island	2	–	16	.111	3	–	24	.111
St. Francis Brooklyn	1	–	17	.056	1	–	26	.037
† 1994 NEC tournament winner

1993–94 Ohio Valley Conference men's basketball standings
	Conf.				Overall
Team	W		L	PCT	W		L	PCT
Murray State	15	–	1	.938	23	–	6	.793
Tennessee State †	12	–	4	.750	19	–	12	.613
Austin Peay	10	–	6	.625	11	–	16	.407
Eastern Kentucky	9	–	7	.563	13	–	14	.481
Morehead State	8	–	8	.500	14	–	14	.500
Tennessee Tech	5	–	11	.313	10	–	21	.323
Middle Tennessee	5	–	11	.313	8	–	19	.296
Southeast Missouri State	5	–	11	.313	10	–	17	.370
UT Martin	3	–	13	.188	5	–	22	.185
† 1994 OVC tournament winner Rankings from AP Poll

1993–94 Pacific-10 Conference men's basketball standings
	Conf.				Overall
Team	W		L	PCT	W		L	PCT
No. 9 Arizona	14	–	4	.778	29	–	6	.829
No. 17 UCLA	13	–	5	.722	21	–	7	.750
No. 16 California	13	–	5	.722	22	–	8	.733
Washington State	10	–	8	.556	20	–	11	.645
Stanford	10	–	8	.556	17	–	11	.607
Arizona State	10	–	8	.556	15	–	13	.536
USC	9	–	9	.500	16	–	12	.571
Oregon	6	–	12	.333	10	–	17	.370
Washington	3	–	15	.167	5	–	22	.185
Oregon State	2	–	16	.111	6	–	21	.222
Rankings from AP Poll

1993–94 Patriot League men's basketball standings
	Conf.				Overall
Team	W		L	PCT	W		L	PCT
Navy †	9	–	5	.643	17	–	13	.567
Fordham	9	–	5	.643	12	–	15	.444
Colgate	9	–	5	.643	17	–	12	.586
Holy Cross	9	–	5	.643	14	–	14	.500
Bucknell	6	–	8	.429	10	–	17	.370
Lehigh	6	–	8	.429	10	–	17	.370
Lafayette	4	–	10	.286	9	–	19	.321
Army	4	–	10	.286	7	–	20	.259
† 1994 Patriot League tournament winner

1993–94 Southeastern Conference men's basketball standings
	Conf.				Overall
Team	W		L	PCT	W		L	PCT
East
No. 14 Florida	12	–	4	.750	29	–	8	.784
No. 7 Kentucky †	12	–	4	.750	27	–	7	.794
Vanderbilt	9	–	7	.563	20	–	12	.625
Georgia	7	–	9	.438	14	–	16	.467
South Carolina	4	–	12	.250	9	–	19	.321
Tennessee	2	–	14	.125	5	–	22	.185
West
No. 2 Arkansas	14	–	2	.875	31	–	3	.912
Alabama	12	–	4	.750	20	–	10	.667
Mississippi State	9	–	7	.563	18	–	11	.621
Ole Miss	7	–	9	.438	14	–	13	.519
LSU	5	–	11	.313	11	–	16	.407
Auburn	3	–	13	.188	11	–	17	.393
† 1994 SEC tournament winner Rankings from AP Poll

1993–94 Southern Conference men's basketball standings
	Conf.				Overall
Team	W		L	PCT	W		L	PCT
Chattanooga †	14	–	4	.778	23	–	7	.767
Davidson	13	–	5	.722	22	–	8	.733
East Tennessee State	13	–	5	.722	16	–	14	.533
Appalachian State	12	–	6	.667	16	–	11	.593
Georgia Southern	9	–	9	.500	14	–	14	.500
Western Carolina	8	–	10	.444	12	–	16	.429
Marshall	7	–	11	.389	9	–	18	.333
The Citadel	6	–	12	.333	11	–	16	.407
Furman	6	–	12	.333	10	–	18	.357
VMI	2	–	16	.111	5	–	23	.179
† 1994 SoCon Tournament winner As of April 30, 1994; Rankings from AP poll

1993–94 Southland Conference men's basketball standings
	Conf.				Overall
Team	W		L	PCT	W		L	PCT
NE Louisiana	15	–	3	.833	19	–	9	.679
SW Texas State †	14	–	4	.778	25	–	7	.781
Nicholls State	12	–	6	.667	19	–	9	.679
North Texas	9	–	9	.500	14	–	15	.483
McNeese State	9	–	9	.500	11	–	16	.407
UTSA	8	–	10	.444	12	–	15	.444
Sam Houston State	7	–	11	.389	7	–	20	.259
Northwestern State	6	–	12	.333	11	–	15	.423
Stephen F. Austin	6	–	12	.333	9	–	18	.333
Texas–Arlington	4	–	14	.222	7	–	22	.241
† 1994 Southland Conference tournament winner Rankings from AP Poll

1993–94 Southwest Conference men's basketball standings
	Conf.				Overall
Team	W		L	PCT	W		L	PCT
No. 20 Texas †	12	–	2	.857	26	–	8	.765
Texas A&M	10	–	4	.714	19	–	11	.633
Texas Tech	10	–	4	.714	17	–	11	.607
Baylor	7	–	7	.500	16	–	11	.593
Rice	6	–	8	.429	15	–	14	.517
Houston	5	–	9	.357	8	–	19	.296
SMU	3	–	11	.214	6	–	21	.222
TCU	3	–	11	.214	7	–	20	.259
† 1994 SWC tournament winner Rankings from AP Poll

1993–94 SWAC men's basketball standings
	Conf.				Overall
Team	W		L	PCT	W		L	PCT
Texas Southern †	12	–	2	.857	19	–	11	.633
Jackson State	11	–	3	.786	19	–	10	.655
Alabama State	10	–	4	.714	19	–	10	.655
Southern	8	–	6	.571	16	–	11	.593
Mississippi Valley State	6	–	8	.429	10	–	17	.370
Grambling State	4	–	10	.286	9	–	18	.333
Alcorn State	3	–	11	.214	3	–	24	.111
Prairie View A&M	2	–	12	.143	5	–	22	.185
† 1994 SWAC tournament winner Rankings from AP Poll

1993–94 Sun Belt Conference men's basketball standings
	Conf.				Overall
Team	W		L	PCT	W		L	PCT
Western Kentucky	14	–	4	.778	20	–	11	.645
SW Louisiana †	13	–	5	.722	22	–	8	.733
New Orleans	12	–	6	.667	20	–	10	.667
Jacksonville	11	–	7	.611	17	–	11	.607
Arkansas State	10	–	8	.556	15	–	12	.556
South Alabama	9	–	9	.500	13	–	14	.481
Texas-Pan American	9	–	9	.500	16	–	12	.571
Arkansas-Little Rock	6	–	12	.333	13	–	15	.464
Lamar	6	–	12	.333	10	–	17	.370
Louisiana Tech	0	–	18	.000	2	–	25	.074
† 1994 Sun Belt Conference tournament winner Rankings from AP Poll

1993–94 Trans America Athletic Conference men's basketball standings
	Conf.				Overall
Team	W		L	PCT	W		L	PCT
College of Charleston	14	–	2	.875	24	–	4	.857
Central Florida †	11	–	5	.688	21	–	9	.700
Stetson	9	–	7	.563	14	–	15	.483
Georgia State	9	–	7	.563	13	–	14	.481
Centenary	8	–	8	.500	16	–	12	.571
Florida International	7	–	9	.438	11	–	16	.407
Southeastern Louisiana	7	–	9	.438	10	–	17	.370
Samford	4	–	12	.250	10	–	18	.357
Mercer	3	–	13	.188	5	–	24	.172
Florida Atlantic		–		–	3	–	24	.111
† 1994 TAAC tournament winner Rankings from AP poll

1993–94 West Coast Conference men's basketball standings
	Conf.				Overall
Team	W		L	PCT	W		L	PCT
Gonzaga	12	–	2	.857	22	–	8	.733
Pepperdine †	8	–	6	.571	19	–	11	.633
San Francisco	8	–	6	.571	17	–	11	.607
San Diego	7	–	7	.500	18	–	11	.621
Portland	6	–	8	.429	13	–	17	.433
Santa Clara	6	–	8	.429	13	–	14	.481
Saint Mary's	5	–	9	.357	13	–	14	.481
Loyola Marymount	4	–	10	.286	6	–	21	.222
† Conference tournament winner Rankings from AP poll

1993–94 WAC men's basketball standings
	Conf.				Overall
Team	W		L	PCT	W		L	PCT
New Mexico	14	–	4	.778	23	–	8	.742
Fresno State	13	–	5	.722	21	–	11	.656
BYU	12	–	6	.667	22	–	10	.688
Hawaii †	11	–	7	.611	18	–	15	.545
Colorado State	8	–	10	.444	15	–	13	.536
Utah	8	–	10	.444	14	–	14	.500
UTEP	8	–	10	.444	18	–	12	.600
Wyoming	7	–	11	.389	14	–	14	.500
San Diego State	6	–	12	.333	12	–	16	.429
Air Force	3	–	15	.167	8	–	18	.308
† 1994 WAC tournament winner Rankings from AP Poll

=== Division I independents ===
Six schools played as independents. They had no postseason play.

1993–94 NCAA Division I men's basketball independents standings
	Conf.				Overall
Team	W		L	PCT	W		L	PCT
Southern Utah	-	–	-	–	16	–	11	.593
UMKC	-	–	-	–	12	–	17	.414
Notre Dame	-	–	-	–	12	–	17	.414
Cal State Northridge	-	–	-	–	8	–	18	.308
Oral Roberts	-	–	-	–	6	–	21	.222
Sacramento State	-	–	-	–	1	–	26	.037
Rankings from AP Poll

=== Informal championships ===
Conference	Regular season winner	Most Valuable Player
Philadelphia Big 5	Penn & Temple	Eddie Jones, Temple

For the third consecutive season, the Philadelphia Big 5 did not play a full round-robin schedule in which each team met each other team once, a format it had used from its first season of competition in 1955–56 through the 1990–91 season. Instead, each team played only two games against other Big 5 members, and Penn and Temple both finished with 2–0 records in head-to-head competition among the Big 5. The Big 5 did not revive its full round-robin schedule until the 1999–2000 season.

=== Statistical leaders ===
Source for additional stats categories

Points per game			Rebounds per game			Assists per game			Steals per game		
Player	School	PPG	Player	School	RPG	Player	School	APG	Player	School	SPG
Glenn Robinson	Purdue	30.3	Jerome Lambert	Baylor	14.8	Jason Kidd	California	9.1	Shawn Griggs	LA-Lafayette	4.0
Rob Feaster	Holy Cross	28.0	Jervaughn Scales	Southern	14.2	David Edwards	Texas A&M	8.8	Gerald Walker	San Francisco	3.9
Jervaughn Scales	Southern	27.1	Eric Kubel	Northwestern St.	13.1	Tony Miller	Marquette	8.3	Andre Cradle	Long Island	3.8
Frankie King	W. Carolina	26.9	Kendrick Warren	VCU	12.4	Eathan O'Bryant	Nevada	8.3	Jason Kidd	California	3.1
Tucker Neale	Colgate	26.6	Malik Rose	Drexel	12.4	Abdul Abdullah	Providence	8.0	B. J. Tyler	Texas	3.1

Blocked shots per game			Field goal percentage			Three-point FG percentage			Free throw percentage		
Player	School	BPG	Player	School	FG%	Player	School	3FG%	Player	School	FT%
Grady Livingston	Howard	4.4	Mike Atkinson	Long Beach St.	.695	Howard Eisley	Boston College	.484	Danny Baisle	Marist	.944
Jim McIlvaine	Marquette	4.3	Lynwood Wade	SW Texas St.	.671	Brooks Thompson	Oklahoma St.	.472	Dandrea Evans	Troy St.	.935
Theo Ratliff	Wyoming	4.1	Anthony Miller	Michigan St.	.651	Scott Neely	Campbell	.468	Casey Schmidt	Valparaiso	.926
David Vaughn III	Memphis St.	3.8	Deon Thomas	Illinois	.633	Landon Hackim	Miami (OH)	.463	Matt Hildebrand	Liberty	.925
Tim Duncan	Wake Forest	3.8	Aaron Swinson	Auburn	.631	Gary Collier	Tulsa	.463	Kent Culuko	James Madison	.921

== Post-season tournaments ==
=== NCAA tournament ===
==== Final Four – Charlotte Coliseum, Charlotte, North Carolina ====
National semifinals
E3	Florida	65
SE2	Duke	70
M1	Arkansas	91
W2	Arizona	82

National championship game
SE2	Duke	72
M1	Arkansas	76

=== National Invitation tournament ===
==== Semifinals & finals ====
Semifinals
Vanderbilt	82
Kansas State	76
Villanova	66
Siena	58

Finals
Vanderbilt	73
Villanova	80
Third place
Kansas State	79
Siena	92

== Award winners ==
=== Consensus All-American teams ===
Consensus First Team
Player	Position	Class	Team
Grant Hill	F	Senior	Duke
Jason Kidd	G	Sophomore	California
Donyell Marshall	F	Junior	Connecticut
Glenn Robinson	F	Junior	Purdue
Clifford Rozier	F/C	Junior	Louisville

Consensus Second Team
Player	Position	Class	Team
Melvin Booker	G	Senior	Missouri
Eric Montross	C	Senior	North Carolina
Lamond Murray	F	Junior	California
Khalid Reeves	G	Senior	Arizona
Jalen Rose	G	Junior	Michigan
Corliss Williamson	F	Sophomore	Arkansas

=== Major player of the year awards ===
- Wooden Award: Glenn Robinson, Purdue
- Naismith Award: Glenn Robinson, Purdue
- Associated Press Player of the Year: Glenn Robinson, Purdue
- NABC Player of the Year: Glenn Robinson, Purdue
- Oscar Robertson Trophy (USBWA): Glenn Robinson, Purdue
- Adolph Rupp Trophy: Glenn Robinson, Purdue
- Sporting News Player of the Year: Glenn Robinson, Purdue
- UPI College Basketball Player of the Year: Glenn Robinson, Purdue

=== Major freshman of the year awards ===
- USBWA Freshman of the Year: Joe Smith, Maryland

=== Major coach of the year awards ===
- Associated Press Coach of the Year: Norm Stewart, Missouri
- Henry Iba Award (USBWA): Charlie Spoonhour, Saint Louis
- NABC Coach of the Year: Gene Keady, Purdue & Nolan Richardson, Arkansas
- Naismith College Coach of the Year: Nolan Richardson, Arkansas
- Sporting News Coach of the Year: Norm Stewart, Missouri

=== Other major awards ===
- NABC Defensive Player of the Year: Jim McIlvaine, Marquette
- Frances Pomeroy Naismith Award (Best player under 6'0): Greg Brown, New Mexico
- Robert V. Geasey Trophy (Top player in Philadelphia Big 5): Eddie Jones, Temple
- NIT/Haggerty Award (Top player in New York City metro area): Izett Buchanan, Marist & Artūras Karnišovas, Seton Hall

== Coaching changes ==
A number of teams changed coaches during the season and after it ended.

Team	Former Coach	Interim Coach	New Coach	Reason
Arkansas State	Nelson Catalina		Dickey Nutt	Nutt was a long time assistant under Catalina.
Arkansas–Little Rock	Jim Platt		Wimp Sanderson	Platt left to join the Tulsa coaching staff.
Auburn	Tommy Joe Eagles		Cliff Ellis	Eagles passed away during the offseason.
Baylor	Darrel Johnson		Harry Miller	Johnson was fired for violations against the NCAA.
Boston University	Bob Brown		Dennis Wolff	Wolff was hired from the Virginia coaching staff.
Bucknell	Charlie Woollum		Pat Flannery	Woollum left to coach his alma mater, William & Mary.
Cal State Fullerton	Brad Holland		Bob Hawking	Holland left to coach San Diego. Hawking was promoted from assistant to head coach.
Chicago State	Rick Pryor		Craig Hodges	Hodges coached Chicago State while also playing for Galatasaray
Clemson	Cliff Ellis		Rick Barnes	Ellis left to coach Auburn.
Coastal Carolina	Russ Bergman		Michael Hopkins	
Creighton	Rick Johnson		Dana Altman	
Dayton	Jim O'Brien		Oliver Purnell	O'Brien was fired after having a record of 10–47 in his final two years.
Delaware State	Jeff Jones		Fred Goodman	
Furman	Butch Estes		Joe Cantafio	
Georgia State	Bob Reinhart		Carter Wilson	
Hofstra	Butch van Breda Kolff		Jay Wright	Wright was hired from the UNLV coaching staff.
Holy Cross	George Blaney		Bill Raynor	Blaney left to coach Seton Hall.
Howard	Butch Beard		Mike McCleese	Beard left to coach New Jersey Nets
Indiana State	Tates Locke		Sherman Dillard	Locke resigned after going 4–22. Dillard was hired off the Georgia Tech coaching staff.
Iowa State	Johnny Orr		Tim Floyd	
Jacksonville	Matt Kilcullen		George Scholz	Kilcullen left to coach Western Kentucky.
Kansas State	Dana Altman		Tom Asbury	Altman left to coach Creighton.
Louisiana Tech	Jerry Loyd		Jim Wooldridge	
Loyola (MD)	Skip Prosser		Brian Ellerbe	Prosser was hired as an assistant from Xavier and left after one year when Xavier head coaching job opened up. Ellerbe hired from the Virginia coaching staff.
Loyola (IL)	Will Rey		Ken Burmeister	
Marquette	Kevin O'Neil		Mike Deane	O'Neil left to coach Tennessee.
Marshall	Dwight Freeman		Bill Donovan	Freeman left to join the coaching staff of James Madison. Donovan was hired from the Kentucky coaching staff.
Maryland Eastern Shore	Rob Chavez		Jeff Menday	Chavez left to coach Portland.
McNeese State	Steve Welch		Ron Everhart	Everhart was hired from the Tulane coaching staff.
Morgan State	Michael Holmes		Lynn Rampage	
New Orleans	Tim Floyd		Tic Price	Floyd left to coach Iowa State. Price was hired from the Auburn coaching staff.
North Carolina A&T	Jeff Capel II		Roy Thomas	Capel II left to coach Old Dominion.
Northeastern	Karl Fogel		Dave Leitao	Fogel left to coach Mercyhurst. Leitao was hired from the Connecticut coaching staff to coach his alma mater.
Northern Arizona	Harold Merritt		Ben Howland	
Northwestern State	Dan Bell		J. D. Barnett	Barnett was also hired to be the associate athletic director.
Oklahoma	Billy Tubbs		Kelvin Sampson	Tubbs left to coach TCU.
Old Dominion	Oliver Purnell		Jeff Capel II	Purnell left to coach Dayton.
Pepperdine	Tom Asbury		Tony Fuller	Asbury left to coach Kansas State.
Pittsburgh	Paul Evans		Ralph Willard	
Portland	Larry Steele		Rob Chavez	
Providence	Rick Barnes		Pete Gillen	Barnes left to coach Clemson.
San Diego	Hank Egan		Brad Holland	Egan left to join the San Antonio Spurs coaching staff.
San Diego State	Tony Fuller		Fred Trenkle	Fuller left to coach Pepperdine.
Siena	Mike Deane		Bob Beyer	Deane left to coach Marquette.
Seton Hall	P. J. Carlesimo		George Blaney	Carlesimo left to coach the Portland Trail Blazers.
Southeastern Louisiana	Norm Picou		John Lyles	
SW Texas State	Jim Wooldridge		Mike Miller	Wooldridge left to coach his alma mater, Louisiana Tech. Miller was promoted from assistant.
TCU	Moe Iba		Billy Tubbs	
Tennessee	Wade Houston		Kevin O'Neill	
UNC Wilmington	Kevin Eastman		Jerry Wainwright	Eastman left to coach Washington State. Wainwright was hired from the Wake Forest coaching staff.
UNLV	Rollie Massimino		Tim Grgurich	Massimino was forced out after cutting a deal with the UNLV president to raise his salary above what was reported. Grgurich was a long time assistant under UNLV coach Jerry Tarkanian.
USC	George Raveling		Charlie Parker	Raveling retired before the start of the 1994–95 season due to lengthy rehabilitation from a car crash. Parker was elevated to head coach after Raveling retired right before the season started.
VMI	Joe Cantafio		Bart Bellairs	Cantafio left to coach Furman.
Washington State	Kelvin Sampson		Kevin Eastman	Sampson left to coach Oklahoma.
Western Kentucky	Ralph Willard		Matt Kilcullen	Willard left to coach Pittsburgh.
William & Mary	Chuck Swenson		Charlie Woollum	Swenson left to join the Duke coaching staff and link up with Krzyzewski again after 10 years at Army and Duke before he took the head coaching job at William & Mary.
Wisconsin	Stu Jackson		Stan Van Gundy	Jackson resigned after the season to be the general manager of the Vancouver Grizzlies. Van Gundy was promoted from assistant to head coach.
Xavier	Pete Gillen		Skip Prosser	Gillen left to coach Providence.
