= 1994 Midwestern Collegiate Conference men's basketball tournament =

- Classification: Division I
- Season: 1993–94
- Teams: 6
- Site: Hinkle Fieldhouse; Indianapolis, Indiana
- Champions: Detroit (1st title)
- Winning coach: Perry Watson (1st title)
- MVP: Andy Elkins (Evansville)

1993–94 Midwestern Collegiate Conference men's basketball standings
	Conf.				Overall
Team	W		L	PCT	W		L	PCT
Xavier	8	–	2	.800	22	–	8	.733
Evansville	6	–	4	.600	21	–	11	.656
Butler	6	–	4	.600	16	–	13	.552
Detroit Mercy †	5	–	5	.500	16	–	13	.552
La Salle	4	–	6	.400	11	–	16	.407
Loyola (IL)	1	–	9	.100	8	–	19	.296
† 1994 MCC tournament winner Rankings from AP Poll

The 1994 Midwestern Collegiate Conference men's basketball tournament (now known as the Horizon League men's basketball tournament) was held March 6–8 at Hinkle Fieldhouse in Indianapolis, Indiana.

Detroit defeated Evansville in the championship game, 72–63, to win their first MCC/Horizon League men's basketball tournament title. Evansville was denied a third straight tournament title.

The Titans, however, did not receive a bid to the 1994 NCAA tournament, because with Dayton and Duquesne leaving the league before the season, they did not have enough members that had continuous membership in the conference for the preceding five years. They regained their automatic bid the following year, when seven new members joined the league.

== Format ==
All six conference members participated in the tournament and were seeded based on regular season conference records.

== Bracket ==
Quarterfinals; Sunday, March 6
4	Detroit	87
5	La Salle	70
3	Butler	78
6	Loyola-Chicago	67

Semifinals; Monday, March 7
1	Xavier	75
4	Detroit	79
3	Butler	66
2	Evansville	68

Championship; Tuesday, March 8
4	Detroit	70
2	Evansville	65
