= 1993–94 Minnesota Golden Gophers men's basketball team =

American college basketball season

1993–94 Minnesota Golden Gophers men's basketball

NCAA tournament, second round (vacated)
- Conference: Big Ten Conference

Ranking
- AP: No. 23
- Record: 21-12 (22–13 unadjusted) (10–8 Big Ten)
- Head coach: Clem Haskins (8th season)
- Assistant coaches: Milton Barnes; Dan Kosmoski; Dave Thorson
- Home arena: Williams Arena

1993–94 Big Ten Conference men's basketball standings
	Conf.				Overall
Team	W		L	PCT	W		L	PCT
No. 3 Purdue	14	–	4	.778	29	–	5	.853
No. 11 Michigan	13	–	5	.722	24	–	8	.750
No. 18 Indiana	12	–	6	.667	21	–	9	.700
No. 23 Minnesota	10	–	8	.556	21	–	12	.636
Michigan State	10	–	8	.556	20	–	12	.625
Illinois	10	–	8	.556	17	–	11	.607
Wisconsin	8	–	10	.444	18	–	11	.621
Penn State	6	–	12	.333	13	–	14	.481
Ohio State	6	–	12	.333	13	–	16	.448
Northwestern	5	–	13	.278	15	–	14	.517
Iowa	5	–	13	.278	11	–	16	.407
Rankings from AP Poll; *Minnesota vacated all NCAA tournament games due to sanctions against the program. Disputed record (22-13)

The 1993–94 Minnesota Golden Gophers men's basketball team represented the University of Minnesota as a member of the Big Ten Conference during the 1993–94 NCAA Division I men's basketball season. Led by 8th-year head coach Clem Haskins, the Golden Gophers advanced to the Second Round of the NCAA tournament and finished with a 22–13 record (10–8 Big Ten; overall record later adjusted to 21–12).

Minnesota vacated its NCAA Tournament appearance due to sanctions from the University of Minnesota basketball scandal.

== Roster ==
1993–94 Minnesota Golden Gophers men's basketball team
Players
Coaches

Pos.	#	Name	Height	Weight	Year	Hometown
C	12	John Thomas	6 ft 9 in (2.06 m)	265 lb (120 kg)	Fr	Roosevelt	Minneapolis, MN
G/F	21	Voshon Lenard	6 ft 4 in (1.93 m)	200 lb (91 kg)	Jr	Detroit, Michigan
C	50	Trevor Winter	7 ft 0 in (2.13 m)	265 lb (120 kg)	Fr	Slayton	Slayton, MN

Head coach

- Clem Haskins

Assistant coach(es)

Legend

- (C) Team captain
- (S) Suspended
- (I) Ineligible
- (W) Walk-on
- Injured
- Current redshirt

== Schedule and results ==
Date time, TV	Rank^{#}	Opponent^{#}	Result	Record	Site city, state
Non-conference Regular Season
Nov 18, 1993*	No. 10	Rice; Preseason NIT	W 70–61	1–0	Williams Arena; Minneapolis, Minnesota
Nov 20, 1993*	No. 10	Georgia; Preseason NIT	W 91–71	2–0	Williams Arena; Minneapolis, Minnesota
Nov 24, 1993*	No. 9	vs. No. 6 Kansas; Preseason NIT	L 71–75	2–1	Madison Square Garden; New York, New York
Nov 26, 1993*	No. 9	vs. No. 1 North Carolina; Preseason NIT	L 76–90	2–2	Madison Square Garden; New York, New York
Dec 15, 1993*	No. 15	Clemson	W 73–54	5–2	Williams Arena; Minneapolis, Minnesota
Dec 28, 1993*	No. 16	at Virginia	L 57–62	7–3	University Hall; Charlottesville, Virginia
Dec 31, 1993*	No. 16	James Madison	W 73–68	8–3	Williams Arena; Minneapolis, Minnesota
Big Ten Regular Season
Mar 9, 1994	No. 20	at Illinois	L 75–90	20–11 (10–8)	Assembly Hall; Champaign, Illinois
NCAA Tournament
Mar 18, 1994*	(6 W) No. 23	vs. (11 W) Southern Illinois; First Round	W 74–60	21–11	ARCO Arena; Sacramento, California
Mar 20, 1994*	(6 W) No. 23	vs. (3 W) No. 10 Louisville; Second Round	L 55–60	21–12	ARCO Arena; Sacramento, California
*Non-conference game. ^{#}Rankings from AP Poll. (#) Tournament seedings in parentheses. W=West.
