= 1993–94 Michigan Wolverines men's basketball team =

American college basketball season

1993–94 Michigan Wolverines men's basketball

NCAA tournament, Elite Eight
- Conference: Big Ten Conference

Ranking
- Coaches: No. 8
- AP: No. 11
- Record: 24–8 (13–5 Big Ten)
- Head coach: Steve Fisher
- Assistant coaches: Brian Dutcher; Jay Smith; Scott Trost
- MVPs: Jalen Rose; Juwan Howard
- Captains: Jason Bossard; Juwan Howard
- Home arena: Crisler Arena

1993–94 Big Ten Conference men's basketball standings
	Conf.				Overall
Team	W		L	PCT	W		L	PCT
No. 3 Purdue	14	–	4	.778	29	–	5	.853
No. 11 Michigan	13	–	5	.722	24	–	8	.750
No. 18 Indiana	12	–	6	.667	21	–	9	.700
No. 23 Minnesota	10	–	8	.556	21	–	12	.636
Michigan State	10	–	8	.556	20	–	12	.625
Illinois	10	–	8	.556	17	–	11	.607
Wisconsin	8	–	10	.444	18	–	11	.621
Penn State	6	–	12	.333	13	–	14	.481
Ohio State	6	–	12	.333	13	–	16	.448
Northwestern	5	–	13	.278	15	–	14	.517
Iowa	5	–	13	.278	11	–	16	.407
Rankings from AP Poll; *Minnesota vacated all NCAA tournament games due to sanctions against the program. Disputed record (22-13)

The 1993–94 Michigan Wolverines men's basketball team represented the University of Michigan in intercollegiate college basketball during the 1993–94 season. The team played its home games in the Crisler Arena in Ann Arbor, Michigan, and was a member of the Big Ten Conference. Under the direction of head coach Steve Fisher, the team finished second in the Big Ten Conference. The team earned an invitation to the 1994 NCAA Division I men's basketball tournament as a number three seed and advanced to the fourth round. The team was ranked for the entire eighteen weeks of Associated Press Top Twenty-Five Poll, starting the season ranked fifth, peaking at number three and ending ranked eleventh, and it also ended the season ranked eleventh in the final USA Today/CNN Poll. The team went 6–6 against ranked teams including the following victories: November 26, 1993, against #13 Georgia Tech 80–70 in the Tipoff Classic in Springfield, Massachusetts, January 29, 1994, against #16 Wisconsin 79–75 at home, February 1 against #8 Purdue 63–62 on the road, February 8 against #12 Indiana 91–67 at home, February 19 against #20 Minnesota 72–65 at home, and March 19 against #12 Texas in the 1994 NCAA Division I men's basketball tournament 84–79 at Kansas Coliseum.

Juwan Howard and Jason Bossard served as team co-captains, while Howard shared team MVP honors with Jalen Rose. The team's leading scorers were Jalen Rose (636 points), Juwan Howard (625 points), and Jimmy King (358 points). The leading rebounders were Juwan Howard (270), Ray Jackson (195), and Jalen Rose (182).

The team surpassed the 1986 team's single-season total of 265 steals with 267 to establish the current school record.

== Regular season ==
In November 2003, Mitch Albom released his book Fab five: basketball, trash talk, the American dream chronicling the recruiting of and first two years of play of the Fab Five. After Chris Webber left for the NBA, the team entered the season ranked fifth in the nation as it opened the season against number 13 Georgia Tech. Michigan found itself with a 21–6, (13–4 Big Ten) record and tied with the Purdue Boilermakers for the conference lead with one game remaining. Michigan then lost (for the third time in its last four games) to a struggling Northwestern Wildcats team, and finished second in the conference. After the season, Howard was selected as a first team All-Big-Ten member along with Glenn Robinson, Rose, Shawn Respert, and Damon Bailey. In the opening round of the 1994 NCAA Division I men's basketball tournament, Howard helped Michigan survive with a 78–74 overtime victory over Pepperdine by scoring 28 points and adding 9 rebounds before fouling out. In the second round, Howard posted 34 points and 18 rebounds to lead the team to an 84–79 victory over Texas. Michigan faced a Joe Smith-led Maryland in the Sweet Sixteen round. Howard scored 24 and had 11 rebounds before fouling out with 2:49 remaining in the 78–71 victory. Howard earned the regional MVP award with a game-high 30 points and 13 rebounds despite collecting two fouls in the first two minutes in the Elite Eight round against a victorious Arkansas team that had United States President Bill Clinton as a vocal supporter. After the season, Howard announced his intention to enter the 1994 NBA Draft. The following day, Rose announced he would enter the draft as well.

== Schedule and results ==
Date time, TV	Rank^{#}	Opponent^{#}	Result	Record	Site city, state
Non-conference Regular Season
Nov 26, 1993*	No. 5	vs. No. 13 Georgia Tech	W 80–70	1–0	Springfield Civic Center; Springfield, Massachusetts
Nov 29, 1993*	No. 5	Cleveland State	W 84–71	2–0	Crisler Arena; Ann Arbor, Michigan
Dec 2, 1993*	No. 5	Tulane	W 84–69	3–0	Crisler Arena; Ann Arbor, Michigan
Dec 4, 1993*	No. 5	Chattanooga	W 97–86	4–0	Crisler Arena; Ann Arbor, Michigan
Dec 6, 1993*	No. 3	Detroit Mercy	W 78–60	5–0	Crisler Arena; Ann Arbor, Michigan
Dec 11, 1993*	No. 3	No. 4 Duke	L 63–73	5–1	Crisler Arena; Ann Arbor, Michigan
Dec 20, 1993*	No. 7	Central Michigan	W 86–44	6–1	Crisler Arena; Ann Arbor, Michigan
Dec 28, 1993*	No. 7	vs. Auburn	W 102–81	7–1	McKale Center; Tucson, Arizona
Dec 29, 1993*	No. 7	at No. 12 Arizona	L 95–119	7–2	McKale Center; Tucson, Arizona
Jan 3, 1994*	No. 13	Boston University	W 111–84	8–2	Crisler Arena; Ann Arbor, Michigan
Big Ten Regular Season
Jan 5, 1994	No. 13	Michigan State	W 75–64	9–2 (1–0)	Crisler Arena; Ann Arbor, Michigan
Jan 8, 1994*	No. 13	at Iowa	W 71–70	10–2 (2–0)	Carver-Hawkeye Arena; Iowa City, Iowa
Jan 13, 1994*	No. 10	Ohio State	W 86–75 ^{OT}	11–2 (3–0)	Crisler Arena; Ann Arbor, Michigan
Jan 16, 1994*	No. 10	at No. 11 Indiana	L 72–82	11–3 (3–1)	Assembly Hall; Bloomington, Indiana
Jan 20, 1994	No. 15	at No. 20 Minnesota	L 58–63	11–4 (3–2)	Williams Arena; Minneapolis, Minnesota
Jan 23, 1994	No. 15	at Illinois	W 74–70	12–4 (4–2)	Assembly Hall; Champaign, Illinois
Jan 29, 1994	No. 15	No. 16 Wisconsin	W 79–75	13–4 (5–2)	Crisler Arena; Ann Arbor, Michigan
Feb 1, 1994	No. 13	at No. 8 Purdue	W 63–62	14–4 (6–2)	Mackey Arena; West Lafayette, Indiana
Feb 5, 1994	No. 13	at Michigan State	W 59–51	15–4 (7–2)	Breslin Student Events Center; East Lansing, Michigan
Feb 8, 1994	No. 11	No. 12 Indiana	W 91–67	16–4 (8–2)	Crisler Arena; Ann Arbor, Michigan
Feb 13, 1994	No. 11	at Ohio State	W 72–70	17–4 (9–2)	St. John Arena; Columbus, Ohio
Feb 16, 1994	No. 7	Iowa	W 89–76	18–4 (10–2)	Crisler Arena; Ann Arbor, Michigan
Feb 19, 1994	No. 7	No. 20 Minnesota	W 72–65	19–4 (11–2)	Crisler Arena; Ann Arbor, Michigan
Feb 22, 1994	No. 3	Illinois	W 79–70	20–4 (12–2)	Crisler Arena; Ann Arbor, Michigan
Mar 2, 1994	No. 3	at Wisconsin	L 58–71	20–5 (12–3)	Wisconsin Field House; Madison, Wisconsin
Mar 6, 1994	No. 3	No. 9 Purdue	L 94–95	20–6 (12–4)	Crisler Arena; Ann Arbor, Michigan
Mar 9, 1994	No. 8	Penn State	W 81–72	21–6 (13–4)	Crisler Arena; Ann Arbor, Michigan
Mar 12, 1994	No. 8	at Northwestern	L 93–97 ^{OT}	21–7 (13–5)	Welsh-Ryan Arena; Evanston, Illinois
NCAA Tournament
Mar 17, 1994*	(3 MW) No. 11	vs. (14 MW) Pepperdine; First round	W 78–74 ^{OT}	22–7	Kansas Coliseum; Park City, Kansas
Mar 19, 1994*	(3 MW) No. 11	vs. (6 MW) No. 20 Texas; Second Round	W 84–79	23–7	Kansas Coliseum; Park City, Kansas
Mar 25, 1994*	(3 MW) No. 11	vs. (10 MW) Maryland; Midwest Regional semifinal – Sweet Sixteen	W 78–71	24–7	Reunion Arena; Dallas, Texas
Mar 27, 1994*	(3 MW) No. 11	vs. (1 MW) No. 2 Arkansas; Midwest Regional Final – Elite Eight	L 68–76	24–8	Reunion Arena; Dallas, Texas
*Non-conference game. ^{#}Rankings from AP Poll. (#) Tournament seedings in parentheses. MW=Midwest.

== Rankings ==
Ranking movements Legend: ██ Increase in ranking ██ Decrease in ranking
	Week																	
Poll	Pre	1	2	3	4	5	6	7	8	9	10	11	12	13	14	15	16	Final
AP Poll	5	5	5	3	7	7	7	13	10	15	15	13	11	7	3	3	8	11

== Team players drafted into the NBA ==
Four players from this team were selected in the NBA draft.

Year	Round	Pick	Overall	Player	NBA Club
1994	1	5	5	Juwan Howard	Washington Bullets
1994	1	13	13	Jalen Rose	Denver Nuggets
1995	2	6	35	Jimmy King	Toronto Raptors
1997	1	11	11	Olivier Saint-Jean	Sacramento Kings

== See also ==
- 1994 NCAA Division I men's basketball tournament
- NCAA Men's Division I tournament bids by school
- NCAA Men's Division I tournament bids by school and conference
- NCAA Division I men's basketball tournament all-time team records
