= 1994 Southwest Conference men's basketball tournament =

- Classification: Division I
- Season: 1993–94
- Teams: 8
- Site: Reunion Arena; Dallas, Texas
- Champions: Texas (1st title)
- Winning coach: Tom Penders (1st title)
- MVP: B. J. Tyler (Texas)

1993–94 Southwest Conference men's basketball standings
	Conf.				Overall
Team	W		L	PCT	W		L	PCT
No. 20 Texas †	12	–	2	.857	26	–	8	.765
Texas A&M	10	–	4	.714	19	–	11	.633
Texas Tech	10	–	4	.714	17	–	11	.607
Baylor	7	–	7	.500	16	–	11	.593
Rice	6	–	8	.429	15	–	14	.517
Houston	5	–	9	.357	8	–	19	.296
SMU	3	–	11	.214	6	–	21	.222
TCU	3	–	11	.214	7	–	20	.259
† 1994 SWC tournament winner Rankings from AP Poll

The 1994 Southwest Conference men's basketball tournament was held March 10–12, 1994, at Reunion Arena in Dallas, Texas.

Number 1 seed Texas defeated 2 seed Texas A&M 87-62 to win their 1st championship and receive the conference's automatic bid to the 1994 NCAA tournament.

== Format and seeding ==
The tournament consisted of the top 8 teams playing in a single-elimination tournament.

Place	Seed	Team	Conference			Overall		
Place	Seed	Team	W	L	%	W	L	%
1	1	Texas	12	2	.857	26	8	.765
2	2	Texas A&M	10	4	.714	19	11	.633
2	3	Texas Tech	10	4	.714	17	11	.607
4	4	Baylor	7	7	.500	16	11	.593
5	5	Rice	6	8	.429	15	14	.517
6	6	Houston	5	9	.357	8	19	.296
7	7	SMU	3	11	.214	6	21	.222
7	8	TCU	3	11	.214	7	20	.259

== Tournament ==
Quarterfinals; Thursday, March 10
1	#25 Texas	96
8	TCU	75
4	Baylor	82
5	Rice	85
3	Texas Tech	110
6	Houston	86
2	Texas A&M	85
7	SMU	66

Semifinals; Friday, March 11
1	#25 Texas	101
5	Rice	89
3	Texas Tech	85
2	Texas A&M	89

Finals; Saturday, March 12
1	#25 Texas	87
2	Texas A&M	62
