= 1993–94 James Madison Dukes men's basketball team =

American college basketball season

1993–94 James Madison Dukes men's basketball

CAA tournament champions

NCAA tournament, First round
- Conference: Colonial Athletic Association
- Record: 20–11 (10–4 CAA)
- Head coach: Lefty Driesell (6th season)
- Home arena: James Madison University Convocation Center

1993–94 CAA men's basketball standings
	Conf.				Overall
Team	W		L	PCT	W		L	PCT
Old Dominion	10	–	4	.714	21	–	10	.677
James Madison †	10	–	4	.714	20	–	10	.667
UNC Wilmington	9	–	5	.643	18	–	10	.643
Richmond	8	–	6	.571	14	–	14	.500
East Carolina	7	–	7	.500	15	–	12	.556
George Mason	5	–	9	.357	10	–	17	.370
American	5	–	9	.357	8	–	19	.296
William & Mary	2	–	12	.143	4	–	23	.148
† 1994 CAA tournament winner Rankings from AP Poll

The 1993–94 James Madison Dukes men's basketball team represented James Madison University during the 1993–94 NCAA Division I men's basketball season. The Dukes, led by 6th-year head coach Lefty Driesell, played their home games at the on-campus Convocation Center and were members of the Colonial Athletic Association (CAA).

The Dukes finished the season with a 20–10 (10–4 CAA) record and won the CAA tournament. The Dukes received an automatic bid to the 1994 NCAA Division I men's basketball tournament for their fourth overall appearance in the tournament – and first in 11 years. In the NCAA Tournament, the 14th-seeded Dukes fell to No. 3 seed and eventual Final Four participant Florida in the opening round.

== Roster ==
1993–94 James Madison Dukes men's basketball team
Players
Coaches

Pos.	#	Name	Height	Weight	Year	Hometown
F	3	Louis Rowe	6 ft 7 in (2.01 m)	—	Jr	St. Petersburg, Florida
F/C	52	Clayton Ritter	6 ft 7 in (2.01 m)	—	Sr	Virginia Beach, Virginia

Head coach

- Lefty Driesell

Assistant coach(es)

Legend

- (C) Team captain
- (S) Suspended
- (I) Ineligible
- (W) Walk-on
- Injured
- Current redshirt

Roster

== Schedule and results ==
Date time, TV	Rank^{#}	Opponent^{#}	Result	Record	Site (attendance) city, state
Regular Season
Nov 27, 1993*		at VCU	L 73–88	0–1	Richmond Coliseum; Richmond, Virginia
Nov 30, 1993*		Howard	W 94–71	1–1	JMU Convocation Center; Harrisonburg, Virginia
Dec 3, 1993*		at No. 14 Purdue	L 74–98	1–2	Mackey Arena; West Lafayette, Indiana
Dec 4, 1993*		vs. Indiana State	W 80–64	2–2	Mackey Arena; West Lafayette, Indiana
Dec 10, 1993*		La Salle	L 85–89	2–3	JMU Convocation Center; Harrisonburg, Virginia
Dec 20, 1993*		Arkansas State	W 83–67	3–3	JMU Convocation Center; Harrisonburg, Virginia
Dec 22, 1993*		Rutgers	W 87–76	4–3	JMU Convocation Center; Harrisonburg, Virginia
Dec 28, 1993*		at Furman	W 85–73	5–3	Memorial Auditorium; Greenville, South Carolina
Dec 31, 1993*		at No. 16 Minnesota	L 68–73	5–4	Williams Arena; Minneapolis, Minnesota
Jan 4, 1994*		Liberty	W 78–64	6–4	JMU Convocation Center; Harrisonburg, Virginia
CAA tournament
Mar 5, 1994*		vs. American; Quarterfinals	W 86–67	18–9	Richmond Coliseum; Richmond, Virginia
Mar 6, 1994*		vs. UNC Wilmington; Semifinals	W 91–78	19–9	Richmond Coliseum; Richmond, Virginia
Mar 7, 1994*		vs. Old Dominion; Championship game	W 77–76	20–9	Richmond Coliseum; Richmond, Virginia
NCAA tournament
Mar 17, 1994*	(14 E)	vs. (3 E) No. 14 Florida; First round	L 62–64	20–10	Nassau Coliseum; Uniondale, New York
*Non-conference game. ^{#}Rankings from AP Poll. (#) Tournament seedings in parentheses. All times are in Eastern Time.
