= 1993–94 Purdue Boilermakers men's basketball team =

American college basketball season

1993–94 Purdue Boilermakers men's basketball

Big Ten Regular season champions Great Alaska Shootout champions

NCAA men's Division I tournament, Elite Eight
- Conference: Big Ten Conference

Ranking
- Coaches: No. 5
- AP: No. 3
- Record: 29–5 (14–4 Big Ten)
- Head coach: Gene Keady (14th season)
- Assistant coaches: Frank Kendrick; Bruce Weber
- Home arena: Mackey Arena

1993–94 Big Ten Conference men's basketball standings
	Conf.				Overall
Team	W		L	PCT	W		L	PCT
No. 3 Purdue	14	–	4	.778	29	–	5	.853
No. 11 Michigan	13	–	5	.722	24	–	8	.750
No. 18 Indiana	12	–	6	.667	21	–	9	.700
No. 23 Minnesota	10	–	8	.556	21	–	12	.636
Michigan State	10	–	8	.556	20	–	12	.625
Illinois	10	–	8	.556	17	–	11	.607
Wisconsin	8	–	10	.444	18	–	11	.621
Penn State	6	–	12	.333	13	–	14	.481
Ohio State	6	–	12	.333	13	–	16	.448
Northwestern	5	–	13	.278	15	–	14	.517
Iowa	5	–	13	.278	11	–	16	.407
Rankings from AP Poll; *Minnesota vacated all NCAA tournament games due to sanctions against the program. Disputed record (22-13)

The 1993–94 Purdue Boilermakers men's basketball team represented Purdue University as a member of the Big Ten Conference during the 1993–94 NCAA Division I men's basketball season. The team was led by Gene Keady and played its home games at Mackey Arena.

== Roster ==
1993–94 Purdue Boilermakers men's basketball team
Players
Coaches

Pos.	#	Name	Height	Weight	Year	Previous school	Hometown
F	13	Glenn Robinson	6 ft 7 in (2.01 m)	—	Jr	Roosevelt	Gary, Indiana
F	22	Cuonzo Martin	6 ft 5 in (1.96 m)	—	Jr	East St. Louis	East St. Louis, Illinois
G	11	Matt Waddell	6 ft 4 in (1.93 m)	—	Jr
G		Porter Roberts	6 ft 3 in (1.91 m)	—	So
F		Brandon Brantley	6 ft 8 in (2.03 m)	—	So
F		Ian Stanback	6 ft 7 in (2.01 m)	—	Sr
F		Justin Jennings	6 ft 6 in (1.98 m)	—	So
F	21	Herb Dove	6 ft 5 in (1.96 m)	—	So
G	30	Linc Darner	6 ft 4 in (1.93 m)	—	Sr	Highland
G		Todd Foster	6 ft 1 in (1.85 m)	—	So
C		Cornelius McNary	6 ft 9 in (2.06 m)	—	Sr
C		Kenny Williams	6 ft 9 in (2.06 m)	—	Sr
G		Tim Ervin	5 ft 6 in (1.68 m)	—	Jr
F		Paul Gilvydis	6 ft 9 in (2.06 m)	—	Fr

Head coach

- Gene Keady (Kansas State)

Assistant coach(es)

- Frank Kendrick (Purdue)
- Bruce Weber (Milwaukee)

Legend

- (C) Team captain
- (S) Suspended
- (I) Ineligible
- (W) Walk-on
- Injured
- Current redshirt

== Schedule and results ==
Date time, TV	Rank^{#}	Opponent^{#}	Result	Record	Site city, state
Regular Season
Nov 24, 1993*	No. 21	vs. Wisconsin-Green Bay; Great Alaska Shootout	W 74–69	1–0	Sullivan Arena; Anchorage, Alaska
Nov 26, 1993*	No. 21	vs. Weber State; Great Alaska Shootout	W 97–78	2–0	Sullivan Arena; Anchorage, Alaska
Nov 27, 1993*	No. 21	vs. Portland; Great Alaska Shootout	W 88–73	3–0	Sullivan Arena; Anchorage, Alaska
Dec 3, 1993*	No. 14	James Madison	W 98–74	4–0	Mackey Arena; West Lafayette, Indiana
Dec 4, 1993*	No. 14	Western Michigan	W 94–54	5–0	Mackey Arena; West Lafayette, Indiana
Dec 8, 1993*	No. 11	at New Orleans	W 84–82	6–0	Lakefront Arena; New Orleans, Louisiana
Dec 10, 1993*	No. 11	vs. Houston	W 114–90	7–0	Indianapolis, Indiana
Dec 18, 1993*	No. 11	Georgia Southern	W 97–59	8–0	Mackey Arena; West Lafayette, Indiana
Dec 21, 1993*	No. 10	Chattanooga	W 74–66	9–0	Mackey Arena; West Lafayette, Indiana
Dec 30, 1993*	No. 10	at Weber State	W 108–73	10–0	Dee Events Center; Ogden, Utah
Jan 2, 1994*	No. 10	vs. San Francisco	W 95–81	11–0	(6,852)
Jan 5, 1994	No. 10	at Northwestern	W 68–67	12–0 (1–0)	Welsh-Ryan Arena; Evanston, Illinois
Jan 9, 1994*	No. 10	Seton Hall	W 69–67	13–0	Mackey Arena; West Lafayette, Indiana
Jan 12, 1994	No. 9	Michigan State	W 89–77	14–0 (2–0)	Mackey Arena; West Lafayette, Indiana
Jan 15, 1994	No. 9	at No. 12 Wisconsin	L 69–75	14–1 (2–1)	Wisconsin Field House; Madison, Wisconsin
Jan 18, 1994	No. 12	No. 8 Indiana	W 83–76 ^{OT}	15–1 (3–1)	Mackey Arena; West Lafayette, Indiana
Jan 22, 1994	No. 12	Ohio State	W 101–63	16–1 (4–1)	Mackey Arena; West Lafayette, Indiana
Jan 27, 1994	No. 7	at Penn State	L 68–71	16–2 (4–2)	Rec Hall; University Park, Pennsylvania
Jan 29, 1994	No. 7	at No. 17 Minnesota	W 75–72	17–2 (5–2)	Williams Arena; Minneapolis, Minnesota
Feb 1, 1994	No. 8	No. 13 Michigan	L 62–63	17–3 (5–3)	Mackey Arena; West Lafayette, Indiana
Feb 6, 1994	No. 8	at Iowa	W 87–78	18–3 (6–3)	Carver-Hawkeye Arena; Iowa City, Iowa
Feb 9, 1994	No. 10	Northwestern	W 98–81	19–3 (7–3)	Mackey Arena; West Lafayette, Indiana
Feb 12, 1994	No. 10	at Michigan State	W 74–70	20–3 (8–3)	Breslin Center; East Lansing, Michigan
Feb 16, 1994	No. 9	No. 24 Wisconsin	W 67–64	21–3 (9–3)	Mackey Arena; West Lafayette, Indiana
Feb 19, 1994	No. 9	at No. 16 Indiana; Rivalry	L 80–82	21–4 (9–4)	Assembly Hall; Bloomington, Indiana
Feb 23, 1994	No. 14	at Ohio State	W 95–85	22–4 (10–4)	St. John Arena; Columbus, Ohio
Feb 26, 1994	No. 14	Penn State	W 71–66	23–4 (11–4)	Mackey Arena; West Lafayette, Indiana
Mar 3, 1994	No. 9	No. 18 Minnesota	W 86–70	24–4 (12–4)	Mackey Arena; West Lafayette, Indiana
Mar 6, 1994	No. 9	at No. 3 Michigan	W 95–94	25–4 (13–4)	Crisler Arena; Ann Arbor, Michigan
Mar 12, 1994*	No. 6	Illinois	W 87–77	26–4 (14–4)	Mackey Arena; West Lafayette, Indiana
NCAA tournament
Mar 17, 1994*	(1 SE) No. 3	vs. (16 SE) Central Florida; First Round	W 98–67	27–4	Rupp Arena; Lexington, Kentucky
Mar 19, 1994*	(1 SE) No. 3	vs. (9 SE) Alabama; Second Round	W 83–73	28–4	Rupp Arena; Lexington, Kentucky
Mar 24, 1994*	(1 SE) No. 3	vs. (4 SE) No. 13 Kansas	W 83–78	29–4	Thompson-Boling Arena; Knoxville, Tennessee
Mar 26, 1994*	(1 SE) No. 3	vs. (2 SE) No. 6 Duke	L 60–69	29–5	Thompson-Boling Arena; Knoxville, Tennessee
*Non-conference game. ^{#}Rankings from AP Poll. (#) Tournament seedings in parentheses. SE=Southeast.

=== NCAA tournament ===
During the 1994 NCAA Division I men's basketball tournament, Purdue qualified for the Elite Eight, where they lost to the Duke Blue Devils.

- Southeast
  - Purdue (#1 seed) 98, Central Florida (#16 seed) 67
  - Purdue 83, Alabama (#9 seed) 73
  - Purdue 83, Kansas (#4 seed) 78
  - Duke (#2 seed) 69, Purdue 60

=== Player stats ===
Player	Games	Minutes	Field goals	Three pointers	Free throws	Rebounds	Blocks	Steals	Points
Glenn Robinson	34	1157	368	79	215	344	31	56	1030

== Awards and honors ==
- Glenn Robinson, Adolph Rupp Trophy
- Glenn Robinson, Chicago Tribune Silver Basketball
- Glenn Robinson, Naismith College Player of the Year
- Glenn Robinson, USBWA College Player of the Year
- Glenn Robinson, John R. Wooden Award
- Glenn Robinson, Associated Press College Basketball Player of the Year
- Glenn Robinson, State Farm Division I Player of the Year Award

== Team players drafted into the NBA ==
Round	Pick	Player	NBA club
1	1	Glenn Robinson	Milwaukee Bucks

== See also ==
- 1994 NCAA Division I men's basketball tournament
- List of NCAA Division I institutions
