= 1993–94 Wisconsin Badgers men's basketball team =

American college basketball season

1993–94 Wisconsin Badgers men's basketball

NCAA Tournament Second Round
- Conference: Big Ten Conference
- Record: 18-11 (8-10 Big Ten)
- Head coach: Stu Jackson (2nd season)
- Associate head coach: Stan Van Gundy
- Assistant coaches: Bob Beyer; Tim Buckley
- Home arena: Wisconsin Field House (capacity: 11,500)

1993–94 Big Ten Conference men's basketball standings
	Conf.				Overall
Team	W		L	PCT	W		L	PCT
No. 3 Purdue	14	–	4	.778	29	–	5	.853
No. 11 Michigan	13	–	5	.722	24	–	8	.750
No. 18 Indiana	12	–	6	.667	21	–	9	.700
No. 23 Minnesota	10	–	8	.556	21	–	12	.636
Michigan State	10	–	8	.556	20	–	12	.625
Illinois	10	–	8	.556	17	–	11	.607
Wisconsin	8	–	10	.444	18	–	11	.621
Penn State	6	–	12	.333	13	–	14	.481
Ohio State	6	–	12	.333	13	–	16	.448
Northwestern	5	–	13	.278	15	–	14	.517
Iowa	5	–	13	.278	11	–	16	.407
Rankings from AP Poll; *Minnesota vacated all NCAA tournament games due to sanctions against the program. Disputed record (22-13)

The 1993–94 Wisconsin Badgers men's basketball team represented the University of Wisconsin–Madison as a member of the Big Ten Conference during the 1993–94 NCAA Division I men's basketball season. Head coach Stu Jackson completed his second and final season coaching the Badgers. The team played its home games in Madison, Wisconsin at the Wisconsin Field House. Wisconsin finished the season 18–11, 8–10 in Big Ten play to finish in seventh place. The Badgers earned an at-large bid to the NCAA tournament as a No. 9 seed in the West Region, defeating No. 8 seed Cincinnati before losing to No. 1 seed Missouri in the Round of 32.

== Season summary ==
A breakthrough season for Wisconsin culminated in its first NCAA Tournament appearance since 1947. Highly-touted freshman center Rashard Griffith joined fellow Chicago natives Tracy Webster and preseason All-American Michael Finley to form a trio of teammates in program history.

Though Jackson's reputation was as an uptempo coach, Wisconsin adjusted its style with Griffith on the court. The Badgers posted an 8–1 record when they scored at least 85 points, but generally played at a slower pace than the previous season. The differences from 1992–93 were most notable during conference play. Wisconsin averaged four fewer points-per-game (69.8), back near the bottom of the league. But it countered with a stingy defense that allowed 70.8 points-per-game to Big Ten foes, ranking just behind league-leader Michigan State. This was an eight-point improvement from the previous season's defense (78.9). The team led the conference in field goal defense (.428) and blocks, with 79. Webster paced the league with 40 steals and Griffith led in blocks-per-game (2.57), swatting 36 in only 14 Big Ten games.

Offensively, a prolific three-point shooting offense led by Finley, Webster and Andy Kilbride shot and made more from long distance than any other Big Ten school, though it only converted on 34.9 percent as a team.

Griffith debuted in spectacular fashion in the season opener versus UW-Milwaukee, posting 27 points, 12 rebounds and six assists in 32 minutes of a 106–84 win. The team scored 100 points the next game as well, a win at Loyola Marymount. The Badgers went undefeated through the non-conference schedule, which included a road win over reigning SWC champion Texas Tech and a home win over ranked rival Marquette. In early January, 11–0 Wisconsin ascended to No. 12 in the country, its highest ranking ever in the AP Poll, following a home victory over Ohio State.

A visit to No. 18 Minnesota the next game resulted in the team's first loss, 90–53. Wisconsin bounced back to beat Glenn Robinson and No. 9 Purdue, 75–69, in a tense matchup of Top 15 teams. Then the Badgers began to succumb to the rigors of the Big Ten.

Two weeks later, Griffith injured his knee and missed two games, starting with a February 2 rematch with Michigan State. Led by Finley's 32 points, 11 rebounds and five assists, the Badgers blew out the Spartans, 87–62, to move to 14-3 (5-3) on the season. However, Griffith would miss two more games with back spasms while the team slipped to 6–6 in conference. Minnesota remained a thorn in its side, blowing out Wisconsin for a second time. The Gophers outscored the Badgers 199–132 in two games.

Riding a four-game losing streak into a matchup with the Fab Five and No. 3 Michigan at the Field House, Wisconsin responded with a resounding 71–58 victory on March 2, 1994. The monumental win essentially saved the team's NCAA Tournament aspirations. The unranked Badgers dropped two of their final regular season games on the road to finish with a losing conference record, yet still received a bid to the Big Dance.

=== Postseason ===
Wisconsin earned a No. 9 seed in the NCAA Tournament's West Region and faced No. 8 seed Cincinnati in a first round game in OgdenUtah. Finley and Griffith pitched in 22 points apiece and the Badgers got nine points in 16 minutes from freshman Jalil Roberts to outlast the Bearcats, 80–72. "We were fighting uphill all the way," Cincinnati head coach Bob Huggins said following the game.

In the second round, the team lost a fast-paced duel to Missouri, the West Region's No. 1 seed, 109–96. Finley scored a career-high 36 points, but the usually dependable Wisconsin defense was torched by the Tigers' 68 percent shooting. Webster added a season-best 27 points to seven assists and no turnovers in his final game as a Badger.

== Awards and honors ==
All-American

- Michael Finley - 2nd team (Basketball Times), honorable mention (AP and USBWA)

All-Big Ten

- Michael Finley - 2nd team (coaches and media)
- Tracy Webster - Honorable mention (coaches and media)

Big Ten Player of the Week

- Michael Finley - Week of January 10, 1994

== Roster ==
1993–94 Wisconsin Badgers men's basketball team
Players
Coaches

Pos.	#	Name	Height	Weight	Year	Hometown
G	3	Jason Johnsen	6 ft 3 in (1.91 m)	190 lb (86 kg)	RS Sr	New Hope, MN
F	4	Brian Kelley	6 ft 7 in (2.01 m)	240 lb (109 kg)	Jr	Decatur, GA
G/F	5	Jalil Roberts	6 ft 4 in (1.93 m)	185 lb (84 kg)	Fr	Jersey City, NJ
G	10	Darnell Hoskins	6 ft 0 in (1.83 m)	165 lb (75 kg)	Fr	Dayton, OH
G	11	Tracy Webster (C)	6 ft 0 in (1.83 m)	185 lb (84 kg)	Sr	Harvey, IL
G	12	Chris Conger (W)	6 ft 3 in (1.91 m)	180 lb (82 kg)	Sr	Green Bay, WI
G	15	Andy Kilbride	6 ft 3 in (1.91 m)	185 lb (84 kg)	Jr	Kankakee, IL
F	22	Otto McDuffie	6 ft 5 in (1.96 m)	200 lb (91 kg)	So	Milwaukee, WI
F	24	Michael Finley (C)	6 ft 6 in (1.98 m)	205 lb (93 kg)	Jr	Maywood, IL
F	34	Howard Moore	6 ft 6 in (1.98 m)	200 lb (91 kg)	RS Jr	Chicago, IL
F/C	43	Jeff Petersen	6 ft 10 in (2.08 m)	225 lb (102 kg)	Sr	Mequon, WI
C	52	Grant Johnson	7 ft 0 in (2.13 m)	245 lb (111 kg)	RS Sr	Plymouth, MN
C	54	Rashard Griffith	6 ft 11 in (2.11 m)	265 lb (120 kg)	Fr	Chicago, IL
C	55	Greg Timmerman*	6 ft 9 in (2.06 m)	220 lb (100 kg)	So	Dickeyville, WI

Head coach

- Stu Jackson (Seattle)

Assistant coach(es)

- Stan Van Gundy (SUNY Brockport)
- Bob Beyer (Alfred)
- Tim Buckley (Bemidji State)

Legend

- (C) Team captain
- (S) Suspended
- (I) Ineligible
- (W) Walk-on
- Injured
- Current redshirt

*transferred to Div. II North Dakota after fall semester

== Schedule ==
Date time, TV	Rank^{#}	Opponent^{#}	Result	Record	High points	High rebounds	High assists	Site (attendance) city, state
Regular Season
11/27/1993*		UW-Milwaukee	W 106-84	1-0	27 – Griffith	12 – Griffith	10 – Webster	Wisconsin Field House (11,500); Madison, WI
12/4/1993*	No. 24	at Loyola Marymount	W 103-67	2-0	24 – Finley	9 – Kelley	10 – Webster	Gersten Pavilion (2,259); Los Angeles, CA
12/8/1993*	No. 19	UW-Green Bay	W 64-50	3-0	19 – Webster	7 – Finley	5 – Finley	Wisconsin Field House (11,500); Madison, WI
12/11/1993*	No. 19	at Texas Tech	W 91-88	4-0	27 – Finley	7 – Griffith	6 – Webster	Lubbock Municipal Coliseum (4,487); Lubbock, TX
12/13/1993*	No. 18	Eastern Michigan	W 94-68	5-0	18 – Finley	12 – Griffith	7 – Webster	Wisconsin Field House (11,500); Madison, WI
12/23/1993*	No. 17	Mississippi Valley State	W 115-79	6-0	21 – Finley	14 – Griffith	8 – Hoskins, Webster	Wisconsin Field House (11,500); Madison, WI
12/27/1993*	No. 17	Stanford	W 80-73	7-0	21 – Finley	12 – Griffith	5 – Finley, Webster	Wisconsin Field House (11,500); Madison, WI
12/29/1993*	No. 17	Grambling	W 103-83	8-0	20 – Griffith	7 – Griffith	7 – Hoskins	Wisconsin Field House (11,500); Madison, WI
1/2/1994*	No. 17	No. 24 Marquette	W 71-52	9-0	14 – Finley	6 – Finley	6 – Webster	Wisconsin Field House (11,500); Madison, WI
1/6/1994	No. 15	at Penn State	W 71-56	10-0 (1-0)	23 – Finley	11 – Griffith	6 – Finley	Rec Hall (6,253); University Park, PA
1/8/1994	No. 15	Ohio State	W 69-55	11-0 (2-0)	21 – Finley	12 – Griffith	4 – Webster	Wisconsin Field House (11,500); Madison, WI
1/12/1994	No. 12	at No. 18 Minnesota	L 53-90	11-1 (2-1)	15 – Finley	8 – Finley	5 – Webster	Williams Arena (14,413); Minneapolis, MN
1/15/1994	No. 12	No. 9 Purdue	W 75-69	12-1 (3-1)	25 – Finley	16 – Griffith	4 – Webster	Wisconsin Field House (11,500); Madison, WI
1/19/1994	No. 14	at Michigan State	L 60-70	12-2 (3-2)	17 – Finley	9 – Finley	3 – Webster	Breslin Center (14,211); East Lansing, MI
1/25/1994	No. 16	Illinois	W 66-56	13-2 (4-2)	17 – Finley	9 – Griffith	7 – Finley, Webster	Wisconsin Field House (11,500); Madison, WI
1/29/1994	No. 16	at No. 15 Michigan	L 75-79	13-3 (4-3)	30 – Finley	6 – Kelley	10 – Webster	Crisler Arena (13,548); Ann Arbor, MI
2/2/1994	No. 16	Michigan State	W 87-62	14-3 (5-3)	32 – Finley	11 – Finley	6 – Webster	Wisconsin Field House (11,500); Madison, WI
2/5/1994	No. 16	at Ohio State	L 57-73	14-4 (5-4)	18 – Finley	5 – Finley, Kelley	4 – Kilbride, Webster	St. John Arena (13,276); Columbus, OH
2/9/1994	No. 21	Penn State	W 77-65	15-4 (6-4)	19 – Finley	6 – Finley, Petersen	7 – Webster	Wisconsin Field House (11,500); Madison, WI
2/12/1994	No. 21	No. 23 Minnesota	L 78-109	15-5 (6-5)	25 – Finley	6 – Petersen	6 – Webster	Wisconsin Field House (11,500); Madison, WI
2/16/1994	No. 24	at No. 9 Purdue	L 64-67	15-6 (6-6)	20 – Kilbride	8 – Kelley	6 – Webster	Mackey Arena (14,123); West Lafayette, IN
2/19/1994	No. 24	Northwestern	L 71-75	15-7 (6-7)	16 – Webster	7 – Griffith	7 – Webster	Wisconsin Field House (11,500); Madison, WI
2/27/1994		at Illinois	L 65-76	15-8 (6-8)	27 – Finley	7 – Petersen	4 – Webster	Assembly Hall (16,321); Champaign, IL
3/2/1994		No. 3 Michigan	W 71-58	16-8 (7-8)	20 – Finley	12 – Griffith	5 – Webster	Wisconsin Field House (11,500); Madison, WI
3/5/1994		at Northwestern	L 54-66	16-9 (7-9)	13 – Griffith	9 – Griffith	5 – Webster	Welsh-Ryan Arena (8,117); Evanston, IL
3/9/1994		Iowa	W 95-71	17-9 (8-9)	27 – Finley	12 – Finley	9 – Webster	Wisconsin Field House (11,500); Madison, WI]]
3/12/1994		at No. 18 Indiana	L 65-78	17-10 (8-10)	11 – Kilbride	10 – Griffith	5 – Finley	Assembly Hall (17,338); Bloomington, IN
NCAA tournament
3/17/1994*	(9)	vs. (8) No. 25 Cincinnati; First Round - West Region	W 80-72	18-10 (8-10)	22 – Finley, Griffith	15 – Griffith	6 – Webster	Dee Events Center (12,126); Ogden, UT
3/19/1994*	(9)	vs. (1) No. 5 Missouri; Second Round - West Region	L 96-109	18-11 (8-10)	36 – Finley	7 – Finley	7 – Webster	Dee Events Center (12,126); Ogden, UT
*Non-conference game. ^{#}Rankings from AP Poll. (#) Tournament seedings in parentheses.

== Rankings ==
Ranking movements Legend: ██ Increase in ranking ██ Decrease in ranking — = Not ranked
	Week																		
Poll	Pre	1	2	3	4	5	6	7	8	9	10	11	12	13	14	15	16	17	Final
AP	—	25	24	19	18	17	17	15	12	14	16	16	21	24	—	—	—	—	Not released
Coaches	22	—	21	19	20	17	15	12	15	17	16	22	23	—	—	—	—	—	—

== Player statistics ==
Individual player statistics (Final)
			Minutes		Scoring		Total FGs			3-point FGs			Free Throws			Rebounds								
Player	GP	GS	Tot	Avg	Pts	Avg	FG	FGA	Pct	3FG	3FA	Pct	FT	FTA	Pct	Off	Def	Tot	Avg	A	TO	Blk	Stl	PF
Finley, Michael	29	29	1046	36.1	592	20.4	208	446	.466	66	182	.363	110	140	.786	56	138	194	6.7	92	75	21	40	67
Griffith, Rashard	25	24	672	26.9	348	13.9	127	236	.538	0	0	-	94	162	.580	74	138	212	8.5	24	61	66	9	67
Webster, Tracy	29	29	897	30.9	332	11.4	120	272	.441	47	119	.396	45	63	.714	11	68	79	2.7	171	72	5	69	55
Petersen, Jeff	29	5	498	17.2	234	8.1	93	157	.592	0	0	-	48	72	.667	56	65	121	4.2	9	33	18	9	69
Kilbride, Andy	29	29	717	24.7	214	7.4	69	164	.421	54	131	.412	22	27	.815	17	59	76	2.6	55	46	0	19	89
Roberts, Jalil	28	0	482	17.2	153	5.5	54	149	.362	25	81	.309	20	32	.625	22	39	61	2.2	20	41	3	12	32
Kelley, Brian	28	24	542	19.4	147	5.3	60	130	.462	3	10	.300	24	38	.632	56	74	130	4.6	21	46	3	11	83
Johnsen, Jason	24	0	247	10.3	76	3.2	26	66	.394	22	55	.400	2	5	.400	5	16	21	0.9	19	8	0	10	25
Moore, Howard	12	0	72	6.0	34	2.8	12	21	.571	0	0	-	10	11	.909	5	12	17	1.4	2	3	2	1	10
Hoskins, Darnell	22	0	245	11.1	60	2.7	18	51	.353	5	23	.217	19	26	.731	4	23	27	1.2	46	30	0	15	23
Johnson, Grant	28	5	305	10.6	41	1.5	17	40	.425	0	0	-	7	18	.389	20	37	57	2.0	7	17	17	4	64
McDuffie, Otto	12	0	49	4.1	17	1.4	8	14	.571	0	0	-	1	5	.200	5	5	10	0.8	4	10	0	1	6
Conger, Chris	10	0	28	2.8	11	1.1	4	9	.444	3	8	.375	0	0	-	0	2	2	0.2	2	3	0	1	2
Total		-																						
Opponents		-																						

Legend
GP	Games played	GS	Games started	Tot	Total count	Avg	Average per game	Pts	Points
FG	Field goals made	FGA	Field goal attempts	3FG	3-pointers made	3FA	3-point attempts	FT	Free throws made
FTA	Free throw attempts	Off	Offensive rebounds	Def	Defensive rebounds	A	Assists	TO	Turnovers
Blk	Blocks	Stl	Steals	PF	Personal fouls	Team high

== Records and trivia ==
Tracy Webster set a Wisconsin single season record for steals, with 69. The senior's assist-to-turnover ratio of 2.38 during the 1993-94 season topped Mike Heineman's nine-year-old record and stood for five more seasons until Mike Kelley's 1998-99 season.

Webster left school as the program's all-time leader in career assists (501) and steals (183), compiling those numbers in just three seasons. His assist total remains a Wisconsin record.
