= 1993–94 Michigan State Spartans men's basketball team =

American college basketball season

1993–94 Michigan State Spartans men's basketball

Oldsmobile Spartan Classic champions

NCAA tournament, second round
- Conference: Big Ten Conference
- Record: 20–12 (10–8 Big Ten)
- Head coach: Jud Heathcote (18th season)
- Assistant coaches: Tom Izzo; Stan Joplin; Brian Gregory
- Captains: Kris Weshinskey; Shawn Respert
- Home arena: Breslin Center

1993–94 Big Ten Conference men's basketball standings
	Conf.				Overall
Team	W		L	PCT	W		L	PCT
No. 3 Purdue	14	–	4	.778	29	–	5	.853
No. 11 Michigan	13	–	5	.722	24	–	8	.750
No. 18 Indiana	12	–	6	.667	21	–	9	.700
No. 23 Minnesota	10	–	8	.556	21	–	12	.636
Michigan State	10	–	8	.556	20	–	12	.625
Illinois	10	–	8	.556	17	–	11	.607
Wisconsin	8	–	10	.444	18	–	11	.621
Penn State	6	–	12	.333	13	–	14	.481
Ohio State	6	–	12	.333	13	–	16	.448
Northwestern	5	–	13	.278	15	–	14	.517
Iowa	5	–	13	.278	11	–	16	.407
Rankings from AP Poll; *Minnesota vacated all NCAA tournament games due to sanctions against the program. Disputed record (22-13)

The 1993–94 Michigan State Spartans men's basketball team represented Michigan State University in the 1993–94 NCAA Division I men's basketball season. The team played their home games at Breslin Center in East Lansing, Michigan and were members of the Big Ten Conference. They were coached by Jud Heathcote in his 18th year at Michigan State. The Spartans finished the season with a record of 20–12, 10–8 in Big Ten play to finish in fourth place. They received an at-large bid to the NCAA tournament as the No. 7 seed in the Southeast region. There they beat Seton Hall in the First Round before losing to second-seeded and eventual National Runner-Up Duke in the Second Round.

== Previous season ==
The Spartans finished the 1992–93 season with a record of 15–13, 7–11 in Big Ten play to finish in eighth place. Michigan State received an at-large bid to the National Invitation Tournament. There they lost to Oklahoma in the first round.

== Roster ==
1993–94 Michigan State Spartans men's basketball team
Name	Class	Pos	Height	Summary
Damion Beathea	SO	F	6'7"	5.0 Pts, 3.3 Reb, 1.1 Ast
Quinton Brooks	SO	F	6'7"	11.3 Pts, 4.4 Reb, 0.9 Ast
Jamie Feick	JR	C	6'9"	3.0 Pts, 4.4 Reb, 0.9 Ast
Jon Garavaglia	FR	F	6'9	2.7 Pts, 2.0 Reb, 0.5 Ast
David Hart	SO	G	6'4"	0.5 Pts, 0.4 Reb, 0.4 Ast
Anthony Miller	SR	C	6'9"	12.6 Pts, 9.0 Reb, 0.9 Ast
Steve Nicodemus	SO	G	6'4"	0.8 Pts, 0.3 Reb, 0.2 Ast
Steve Polonowski	FR	F	6'9"	1.4 Pts, 1.2 Reb, 0.1 Ast
Mark Prylow	JR	G	6'3"	1.0 Pts, 1.0 Reb, 0.0 Ast
Erik Qualman	SR	F	6'6"	0.5 Pts, 0.2 Reb, 0.0 Ast
Shawn Respert	JR	G	6'3	24.3 Pts, 4.0 Reb, 2.5 Ast
Eric Snow	JR	G	6'3"	6.8 Pts, 3.5 Reb, 6.7 Ast
Kris Weshinskey	SR	G	6'4"	8.2 Pts, 3.1 Reb, 2.3 Ast

== Schedule and results ==
Date time, TV	Rank^{#}	Opponent^{#}	Result	Record	Site city, state
Non-conference regular season
Nov 26, 1993*		vs. Pacific; San Juan Shootout quarterfinals	W 83–64	1–0	Coliseo Rubén Rodríguez; Bayamón, Puerto Rico
Nov 27, 1993*		vs. Washington State; San Juan Shootout semifinals	L 71–76	1–1	Coliseo Rubén Rodríguez; Bayamón, Puerto Rico
Nov 28, 1993*		vs. East Tennessee State; San Juan Shootout third place game	W 92–69	2–1	Coliseo Rubén Rodríguez; Bayamón, Puerto Rico
Dec 4, 1993*		at No. 11 Louisville	L 68–77	2–2	Freedom Hall; Louisville, KY
Dec 7, 1993*		at Cleveland State	W 90–76	3–2	Henry J. Goodman Arena; Cleveland, OH
Dec 9, 1993*		East Tennessee State	W 107–81	4–2	Breslin Center; East Lansing, MI
Dec 12, 1993*		Detroit Mercy	W 74–63	5–2	Breslin Center; East Lansing, MI
Dec 14, 1993*		UIC	W 90–77	6–2	Breslin Center; East Lansing, MI
Dec 18, 1993*		Nebraska	L 81–85	6–3	Breslin Center; East Lansing, MI
Dec 21, 1993*		at Tennessee	W 69–60	7–3	Thompson-Boling Arena; Knoxville, TN
Dec 29, 1993*		Bowling Green State; Oldsmobile Spartan Classic Semifinals	W 62–49	8–3	Breslin Center; East Lansing, MI
Dec 30, 1993*		Cornell; Oldsmobile Spartan Classic championship	W 83–69	9–3	Breslin Center; East Lansing, MI
Big Ten regular season
Jan 5, 1994		at No. 13 Michigan; Rivalry	L 64–75	9–4 (0–1)	Crisler Arena; Ann Arbor, MI
Jan 8, 1994		No. 21 Illinois	W 79–74	10–4 (1–1)	Breslin Center; East Lansing, MI
Jan 12, 1994		at No. 9 Purdue	L 77–89	10–5 (1–2)	Mackey Arena; West Lafayette, IN
Jan 15, 1994		Northwestern	W 67–46	11–5 (2–2)	Breslin Center; East Lansing, MI
Jan 19, 1994		No. 14 Wisconsin	W 70–60	12–5 (3–2)	Breslin Center; East Lansing, MI
Jan 22, 1994		No. 20 Minnesota	L 66–68	12–6 (3–3)	Williams Arena; Minneapolis, MN
Jan 26, 1994		at No. 9 Ohio State	W 77–71	13–6 (4–3)	St. John Arena; Columbus, OH
Jan 29, 1994		Iowa	W 87–84	14–6 (5–3)	Breslin Center; East Lansing, MI
Feb 2, 1994		at No. 16 Wisconsin	L 62–87	14–7 (5–4)	Wisconsin Field House; Madison, WI
Feb 5, 1994		No. 13 Michigan; Rivalry	L 51–59	14–8 (5–5)	Breslin Center; East Lansing, MI
Feb 9, 1994		at No. 24 Illinois	L 64–72	14–9 (5–6)	Assembly Hall; Champaign, IL
Feb 12, 1994		No. 10 Purdue	L 70–74	14–10 (5–7)	Breslin Center; East Lansing, MI
Feb 17, 1994		at Northwestern	W 60–55	15–10 (6–7)	Welsh-Ryan Arena; Evanston, IL
Feb 23, 1994		No. 20 Minnesota	W 85–68	16–10 (7–7)	Breslin Center; East Lansing, MI
Feb 26, 1994		Ohio State	W 75–60	17–10 (8–7)	Breslin Center; East Lansing, MI
Mar 2, 1994		at Iowa	W 80–72	18–10 (9–7)	Carver-Hawkeye Arena; Iowa City, IA
Mar 9, 1994		No. 18 Indiana	W 94–78	19–10 (10–7)	Breslin Center; East Lansing, MI
Mar 12, 1994		at Penn State	L 70–71	19–11 (10–8)	Rec Hall; University Park, PA
NCAA tournament
Mar 18, 1994*	(7 SE)	vs. (10 SE) Seton Hall; First Round	W 84–73	20–11	Thunderdome; St. Petersburg, FL
Mar 20, 1994*	(7 SE)	vs. (2 SE) No. 6 Duke; Second Round	L 74–85	20–12	Thunderdome; St. Petersburg, FL
*Non-conference game. ^{#}Rankings from AP Poll,. (#) Tournament seedings in parentheses. All times are in Central Time; Source.

== Awards and honors ==
- Shawn Respert – All-Big Ten First Team
