= Harry Miller (basketball, born 1950) =

American basketball coach

Harry Miller (born December 7, 1950) is a former college basketball player and coach. He played college ball at Texas Lutheran College (now Texas Lutheran University) in Seguin. He was head coach at Baylor from 1994 to 1999, serving first as interim coach after Darrel Johnson was fired. Prior to coming to Baylor as an assistant, Miller was a high school coach for 16 years at Temple High School and Seguin High School in Seguin Texas.
