= 1993–94 Indiana Hoosiers men's basketball team =

American college basketball season

1993–94 Indiana Hoosiers men's basketball

NCAA men's Division I tournament, Sweet Sixteen
- Conference: Big Ten Conference

Ranking
- Coaches: No. 16
- AP: No. 18
- Record: 21–9 (12–6 Big Ten)
- Head coach: Bobby Knight (23rd season)
- Captains: Damon Bailey; Pat Graham; Todd Leary
- Home arena: Assembly Hall

1993–94 Big Ten Conference men's basketball standings
	Conf.				Overall
Team	W		L	PCT	W		L	PCT
No. 3 Purdue	14	–	4	.778	29	–	5	.853
No. 11 Michigan	13	–	5	.722	24	–	8	.750
No. 18 Indiana	12	–	6	.667	21	–	9	.700
No. 23 Minnesota	10	–	8	.556	21	–	12	.636
Michigan State	10	–	8	.556	20	–	12	.625
Illinois	10	–	8	.556	17	–	11	.607
Wisconsin	8	–	10	.444	18	–	11	.621
Penn State	6	–	12	.333	13	–	14	.481
Ohio State	6	–	12	.333	13	–	16	.448
Northwestern	5	–	13	.278	15	–	14	.517
Iowa	5	–	13	.278	11	–	16	.407
Rankings from AP Poll; *Minnesota vacated all NCAA tournament games due to sanctions against the program. Disputed record (22-13)

The 1993–94 Indiana Hoosiers men's basketball team represented Indiana University. Their head coach was Bobby Knight, who was in his 23rd year. The team played its home games in Assembly Hall in Bloomington, Indiana, and was a member of the Big Ten Conference.

The Hoosiers finished the regular season with an overall record of 21–9 and a conference record of 12–6, finishing 3rd in the Big Ten Conference. The Hoosiers were invited to participate in the 1994 NCAA tournament, where IU advanced to the Sweet Sixteen for the fourth year in a row. However, this would be the last year of Knight's tenure at Indiana that they did so. For his next six years with the Hoosiers, they advanced no farther than the second round of the tournament, and as a result of this and a continuing series of controversies involving him personally, Knight was fired as Indiana's head coach.

== Roster ==
No.	Name	Position	Ht.	Year	Hometown
12	Rob Foster	G	6–4	Fr.	Los Angeles, California
20	Sherron Wilkerson	G	6–4	Fr.	Jeffersonville, Indiana
21	Richard Mandeville	C	7–1	Fr.	Pasadena, California
22	Damon Bailey	G	6–3	Sr.	Bedford, Indiana
23	Steve Hart	G	6–3	Fr.	Terre Haute, Indiana
25	Pat Knight	G	6–6	Jr.	Bloomington, Indiana
30	Todd Leary	G	6–3	Sr.	Indianapolis, Indiana
32	Robbie Eggers	F	6–10	RS Fr.	Cuyahoga Falls, Ohio
33	Pat Graham	G	6–5	Sr.	Floyds Knobs, Indiana
34	Brian Evans	F	6–8	So.	Terre Haute, Indiana
44	Alan Henderson	F	6–9	Jr.	Indianapolis, Indiana
50	Todd Lindeman	C	7–1	So.	Channing, Michigan
53	Ross Hales	F	6–7	Sr.	Elkhart, Indiana

== Schedule/results ==
Date time, TV	Rank^{#}	Opponent^{#}	Result	Record	Site city, state
Regular season
11/27/1993*	No. 11	at Butler	L 71–75	0–1	Hinkle Fieldhouse; Indianapolis
12/4/1993*	No. 21	vs. No. 1 Kentucky; Indiana–Kentucky rivalry	W 96–84	1–1	Hoosier Dome; Indianapolis
12/7/1993*	No. 12	Notre Dame	W 101–82	2–1	Assembly Hall; Bloomington, Indiana
12/10/1993*	No. 12	Tennessee Tech; Indiana Classic	W 117–73	3–1	Assembly Hall; Bloomington, Indiana
12/11/1993*	No. 12	Washington State; Indiana Classic	W 79–64	4–1	Assembly Hall; Bloomington, Indiana
12/18/1993*	No. 12	Eastern Kentucky	W 91–80	5–1	Assembly Hall; Bloomington, Indiana
12/22/1993*	No. 12	at No. 6 Kansas	L 83–86	5–2	Allen Fieldhouse; Lawrence, Kansas
12/27/1993*	No. 13	vs. TCU; Union Federal Hoosier Classic	W 81–65	6–2	Market Square Arena; Indianapolis
12/28/1993*	No. 13	vs. No. 25 Western Kentucky; Union Federal Hoosier Classic	W 65–55	7–2	Market Square Arena; Indianapolis
1/8/1994	No. 14	Penn State	W 80–72	8–2 (1–0)	Assembly Hall; Bloomington, Indiana
1/11/1994	No. 11	at Iowa	W 89–75	9–2 (2–0)	Carver–Hawkeye Arena; Iowa City, Iowa
1/16/1994	No. 11	No. 15 Michigan	W 82–72	10–2 (3–0)	Assembly Hall; Bloomington, Indiana
1/18/1994	No. 8	at Purdue; Rivalry	L 76–83	10–3 (3–1)	Mackey Arena; West Lafayette, Indiana
1/22/1994	No. 8	Northwestern	W 81–76	11–3 (4–1)	Assembly Hall; Bloomington, Indiana
1/26/1994	No. 11	Minnesota	W 78–66	12–3 (5–1)	Assembly Hall; Bloomington, Indiana
1/30/1994	No. 11	at Illinois; Rivalry	L 81–88	12–4 (5–2)	Assembly Hall; Champaign, Illinois
2/2/1994	No. 14	Ohio State	W 87–83	13–4 (6–2)	Assembly Hall; Bloomington, Indiana
2/5/1994	No. 14	at Penn State	W 76–66	14–4 (7–2)	Rec Hall; University Park, Pennsylvania
2/8/1994	No. 12	at No. 7 Michigan	L 67–91	14–5 (7–3)	Crisler Arena; Ann Arbor, Michigan
2/12/1994	No. 12	Iowa	W 93–91	15–5 (8–3)	Assembly Hall; Bloomington, Indiana
2/19/1994	No. 16	Purdue; Rivalry	W 82–80	16–5 (9–3)	Assembly Hall; Bloomington, Indiana
2/24/1994	No. 12	at Northwestern	W 81–74	17–5 (10–3)	Welsh-Ryan Arena; Evanston, Illinois
2/27/1994	No. 12	at Minnesota	L 56–106	17–6 (10–4)	Williams Arena; Minneapolis
3/1/1994	No. 17	Illinois; Rivalry	W 82–77	18–6 (11–4)	Assembly Hall; Bloomington, Indiana
3/6/1994	No. 17	at Ohio State	L 78–82	18–7 (11–5)	St. John Arena; Columbus, Ohio
3/9/1994	No. 18	at Michigan State	L 78–94	18–8 (11–6)	Breslin Center; East Lansing, Michigan
3/12/1994	No. 18	Wisconsin	W 78–65	19–8 (12–6)	Assembly Hall; Bloomington, Indiana
NCAA tournament
3/18/1994*	No. 18 (5)	vs. No. (12) Ohio; First Round	W 84–72	20–8 (12–6)	USAir Arena; Landover, Maryland
3/20/1994*	No. 18 (5)	vs. No. (4) Temple; Second Round	W 67–58	21–8 (12–6)	USAir Arena; Landover, Maryland
3/25/1994*	No. 18 (5)	vs. No. (9) Boston College; Sweet Sixteen	L 68–77	21–9 (12–6)	Miami Arena; Miami
*Non-conference game. ^{#}Rankings from AP Poll. (#) Tournament seedings in parentheses.
