= 1994 NCAA Division I men's basketball tournament =

Edition of USA college basketball tournament

- Season: 1993–94
- Teams: 64
- Finals site: Charlotte Coliseum, Charlotte, North Carolina
- Champions: Arkansas Razorbacks (1st title, 1st title game, 5th Final Four)
- Runner-up: Duke Blue Devils (7th title game, 11th Final Four)
- Semifinalists: Arizona Wildcats (2nd Final Four); Florida Gators (1st Final Four)
- Winning coach: Nolan Richardson (1st title)
- MOP: Corliss Williamson (Arkansas)
- Attendance: 578,007
- Top scorer: Khalid Reeves (138 points)

The 1994 NCAA Division I men's basketball tournament involved 64 schools in single-elimination play to determine the national champion of men's NCAA Division I college basketball. The 56th annual edition of the tournament began on March 17, 1994, and ended with the championship game at Charlotte Coliseum in Charlotte, North Carolina, on April 4, 1994. The tournament consisted of 63 games.

The Final Four consisted of Arkansas, making its fifth trip and first since 1990, Arizona, Florida, making its first trip, and Duke, making its sixth trip in the last seven tournaments.

In the national championship game, Arkansas defeated Duke by a score of 76–72 and won its first-ever national championship.

== Schedule and venues ==
1994 first and second rounds
1994 Regionals (blue) and Final Four (red)

The following are the sites that were selected to host each round of the 1994 tournament:

First and Second Rounds

- March 17 and 19
  - East Region
    - Nassau Veterans Memorial Coliseum, Uniondale, New York (Hosts: St. John's University, Big East Conference)
  - Midwest Region
    - Kansas Coliseum, Wichita, Kansas (Host: Wichita State University)
  - Southeast Region
    - Rupp Arena, Lexington, Kentucky (Host: University of Kentucky)
  - West Region
    - Dee Events Center, Ogden, Utah (Host: Weber State University)
- March 18 and 20
  - East Region
    - USAir Arena, Landover, Maryland (Host: George Mason University)
  - Midwest Region
    - Myriad Convention Center, Oklahoma City, Oklahoma (Host: University of Oklahoma)
  - Southeast Region
    - Thunderdome, St. Petersburg, Florida (Host: University of South Florida)
  - West Region
    - ARCO Arena, Sacramento, California (Hosts: University of the Pacific, Big West Conference)

Regional semifinals and finals (Sweet Sixteen and Elite Eight)

- March 24 and 26
  - Southeast Regional, Thompson–Boling Arena, Knoxville, Tennessee (Hosts: University of Tennessee, Southeastern Conference)
  - West Regional, Los Angeles Memorial Sports Arena, Los Angeles, California (Hosts: University of Southern California, Pacific-10 Conference)
- March 25 and 27
  - East Regional, Miami Arena, Miami, Florida (Host: University of Miami)
  - Midwest Regional, Reunion Arena, Dallas, Texas (Host: Southwest Conference)

National semifinals and championship (Final Four and championship)

- April 2 and 4
  - Charlotte Coliseum, Charlotte, North Carolina (Host: University of North Carolina at Charlotte)

== Teams ==
There were 30 automatic bids awarded to the tournament - of these, 27 were given to the winners of their conference's tournament, while three were awarded to the team with the best regular-season record in their conference (Big Ten, Ivy League and Pac-10).

Three conferences, the East Coast Conference, Great Midwest Conference, and Midwestern Collegiate Conference, did not receive automatic bids to the tournament.

Four conference champions made their first NCAA tournament appearances: Liberty (Big South), Loyola (MD) (MAAC), Southwest Texas State (Southland), and UCF (TAAC). Additionally, College of Charleston received an at-large bid for its first appearance in the NCAA tournament.

=== Automatic qualifiers ===
Automatic qualifiers
Conference	Team	Appearance	Last bid
ACC	North Carolina	28th	1993
Atlantic 10	UMass	4th	1993
Big East	Providence	12th	1990
Big Eight	Nebraska	5th	1993
Big Sky	Boise State	4th	1993
Big South	Liberty	1st	Never
Big Ten	Purdue	13th	1993
Big West	New Mexico State (vacated)	–	1991
CAA	James Madison	4th	1983
Ivy League	Penn	15th	1993
MAAC	Loyola (MD)	1st	Never
MAC	Ohio	10th	1985
MEAC	North Carolina A&T	8th	1988
Metro	Louisville	24th	1993
Mid-Continent	Green Bay	2nd	1991
Missouri Valley	Southern Illinois	3rd	1993
NAC	Drexel	2nd	1986
NEC	Rider	3rd	1993
Ohio Valley	Tennessee State	2nd	1993
Pac-10	Arizona	13th	1993
Patriot	Navy	9th	1987
SEC	Kentucky	35th	1993
Southern	Chattanooga	6th	1993
Southland	Southwest Texas State	1st	Never
Sun Belt	Southwestern Louisiana	3rd	1992
SWAC	Texas Southern	2nd	1990
SWC	Texas	13th	1992
TAAC	UCF	1st	Never
WAC	Hawaii	2nd	1972
West Coast	Pepperdine	11th	1992

=== Tournament seeds ===
East Regional – Miami Arena, Miami, Florida
Seed	School	Conference	Record	Berth type
1	North Carolina	ACC	27–6	Automatic
2	Connecticut	Big East	27–4	At-Large
3	Florida	SEC	25–7	At-Large
4	Temple	Atlantic 10	22–7	At-Large
5	Indiana	Big Ten	19–8	At-Large
6	Nebraska	Big Eight	20–9	Automatic
7	UAB	Great Midwest	22–7	At-Large
8	Washington State	Pac-10	20–10	At-Large
9	Boston College	Big East	20–10	At-Large
10	George Washington	Atlantic 10	17–11	At-Large
11	Penn	Ivy League	24–2	Automatic
12	Ohio	MAC	25–7	Automatic
13	Drexel	NAC	25–4	Automatic
14	James Madison	CAA	20–9	Automatic
15	Rider	NEC	21–8	Automatic
16	Liberty	Big South	18–11	Automatic

Southeast Regional – Thompson–Boling Arena, Knoxville, Tennessee
Seed	School	Conference	Record	Berth type
1	Purdue	Big Ten	26–4	Automatic
2	Duke	ACC	23–5	At-Large
3	Kentucky	SEC	26–6	Automatic
4	Kansas	Big Eight	25–7	At-Large
5	Wake Forest	ACC	20–11	At-Large
6	Marquette	Great Midwest	22–8	At-Large
7	Michigan State	Big Ten	19–11	At-Large
8	Providence	Big East	20–9	Automatic
9	Alabama	SEC	19–9	At-Large
10	Seton Hall	Big East	17–12	At-Large
11	Southwestern Louisiana	Sun Belt	22–7	Automatic
12	College of Charleston	TAAC	24–3	At-Large
13	Chattanooga	Southern	23–6	Automatic
14	Tennessee State	Ohio Valley	19–11	Automatic
15	Texas Southern	SWAC	19–10	Automatic
16	UCF	TAAC	21–8	Automatic

Midwest Regional – Reunion Arena, Dallas, Texas
Seed	School	Conference	Record	Berth type
1	Arkansas	SEC	25–3	At-Large
2	UMass	Atlantic 10	27–6	Automatic
3	Michigan	Big Ten	21–7	At-Large
4	Oklahoma State	Big Eight	23–9	At-Large
5	UCLA	Pac-10	21–6	At-Large
6	Texas	SWC	25–7	Automatic
7	Saint Louis	Great Midwest	23–5	At-Large
8	Illinois	Big Ten	17–10	At-Large
9	Georgetown	Big East	18–11	At-Large
10	Maryland	ACC	16–11	At-Large
11	Western Kentucky	Sun Belt	20–10	At-Large
12	Tulsa	Missouri Valley	21–7	At-Large
13	New Mexico State (vacated)	Big West	23–7	Automatic
14	Pepperdine	WCC	19–10	Automatic
15	Southwest Texas State	Southland	25–6	Automatic
16	North Carolina A&T	MEAC	16–13	Automatic

West Regional – Los Angeles Memorial Sports Arena, Los Angeles, California
Seed	School	Conference	Record	Berth type
1	Missouri (vacated)	Big Eight	25–3	At-Large
2	Arizona	Pac-10	25–5	Automatic
3	Louisville	Metro	26–5	Automatic
4	Syracuse	Big East	21–6	At-Large
5	California	Pac-10	22–7	At-Large
6	Minnesota (vacated)	Big Ten	20–11	At-Large
7	Virginia	ACC	17–12	At-Large
8	Cincinnati	Great Midwest	22–9	At-Large
9	Wisconsin	Big Ten	17–10	At-Large
10	New Mexico	WAC	23–7	At-Large
11	Southern Illinois	Missouri Valley	23–6	Automatic
12	UW–Green Bay	Mid-Continent	22–6	Automatic
13	Hawaii	WAC	18–14	Automatic
14	Boise State	Big Sky	17–12	Automatic
15	Loyola (MD)	MAAC	17–12	Automatic
16	Navy	Patriot	17–12	Automatic

== Bracket ==
=== East Regional – Miami, Florida ===
First round
1	North Carolina	71
16	Liberty	51
Landover
8	Washington State	64
9	Boston College	67
5	Indiana	84
12	Ohio	72
Landover
4	Temple	61
13	Drexel	39
6	Nebraska	80
11	Penn	90
Uniondale
3	Florida	64
14	James Madison	62
7	UAB	46
10	George Washington	51
Uniondale
2	Connecticut	64
15	Rider	46

Quarter-finals
1	North Carolina	72
9	Boston College	75
5	Indiana	67
4	Temple	58
11	Penn	58
3	Florida	70
10	George Washington	63
2	Connecticut	75

Regional semifinals
9	Boston College	77
5	Indiana	68
3	Florida	69^{OT}
2	Connecticut	60

Regional Finals
9	Boston College	66
3	Florida	74

=== Southeast Regional – Knoxville, Tennessee ===
First round
1	Purdue	98
16	UCF	67
Lexington
8	Providence	70
9	Alabama	76
5	Wake Forest	68
12	College of Charleston	58
Lexington
4	Kansas	102
13	Chattanooga	73
6	Marquette	81
11	Southwest Louisiana	59
St. Petersburg
3	Kentucky	83
14	Tennessee State	70
7	Michigan State	84
10	Seton Hall	73
St. Petersburg
2	Duke	82
15	Texas Southern	70

Quarter-finals
1	Purdue	83
9	Alabama	73
5	Wake Forest	58
4	Kansas	69
6	Marquette	75
3	Kentucky	63
7	Michigan State	74
2	Duke	85

Regional semifinals
1	Purdue	83
4	Kansas	78
6	Marquette	49
2	Duke	59

Regional Finals
1	Purdue	60
2	Duke	69

=== Midwest Regional – Dallas, Texas ===
First round
1	Arkansas	94
16	North Carolina A&T	79
Oklahoma City
8	Illinois	77
9	Georgetown	84
5	UCLA	102
12	Tulsa	112
Oklahoma City
4	Oklahoma State	65
13	New Mexico State	55
6	Texas	91
11	Western Kentucky	77
Wichita
3	Michigan	78^{OT}
14	Pepperdine	74
7	Saint Louis	66
10	Maryland	74
Wichita
2	Massachusetts	78
15	Southwest Texas State	60

Quarter-finals
1	Arkansas	85
9	Georgetown	73
12	Tulsa	82
4	Oklahoma State	80
6	Texas	79
3	Michigan	84
10	Maryland	95
2	Massachusetts	87

Regional semifinals
1	Arkansas	103
12	Tulsa	84
3	Michigan	78
10	Maryland	71

Regional Finals
1	Arkansas	76
3	Michigan	68

=== West Regional – Los Angeles, California ===
First round
1	Missouri	76
16	Navy	53
Ogden
8	Cincinnati	72
9	Wisconsin	80
5	California	57
12	UW–Green Bay	61
Ogden
4	Syracuse	92
13	Hawaii	78
6	~~Minnesota~~	74
11	Southern Illinois	60
Sacramento
3	Louisville	67
14	Boise State	58
7	Virginia	57
10	New Mexico	54
Sacramento
2	Arizona	81
15	Loyola (MD)	55

Quarter-finals
1	Missouri	109
9	Wisconsin	96
12	UW–Green Bay	59
4	Syracuse	64
6	~~Minnesota~~	55
3	Louisville	60
7	Virginia	58
2	Arizona	71

Regional semifinals
1	Missouri	98^{OT}
4	Syracuse	88
3	Louisville	70
2	Arizona	82

Regional Finals
1	Missouri	72
2	Arizona	92

Minnesota vacated its NCAA Tournament appearance from the 1993–94 season due to an academic fraud scandal. Unlike forfeiture, a vacated game does not result in the other school being credited with a win, only with Minnesota removing the wins from its own record.

==== West Region First round ====
CBS

Thursday, March 17
approx. 3:15 pm MST

box score

#12 UW–Green Bay Phoenix 61, #5 California Golden Bears 57
Scoring by half: 32–23, 29–34
Pts: J. Nordgaard – 24; Rebs: J. Nordgaard – 9 Asts: J. Martinez – 7	Pts: L. Murray – 18; Rebs: J. Kidd, L. Murray – 11; Asts: J. Kidd – 7

Dee Events Center – Ogden
Attendance: 12,126
Referees: Lenny Wirtz, Ed Corbett, Rick Hartzell

==== West Region Second Round ====
CBS

Saturday, March 19
2:35 pm MST

box score

#12 UW–Green Bay Phoenix 59, #4 Syracuse Orangemen 64
Scoring by half: 26–37, 33–27
Pts: J. Nordgaard – 19; Rebs: J. Ludvigson – 7 Asts: G. Grzesk – 7	Pts: L. Moten – 17; Rebs: L. Jackson, L. Moten, J. Wallace – 8 Asts: A. Autry – 5

Dee Events Center – Ogden
Attendance: 12,126
Referees: Lenny Wirtz, Andre Pattillo, Bob Barnett

=== Final Four – Charlotte, North Carolina ===
National semifinals
E3	Florida	65
SE2	Duke	70
MW1	Arkansas	91
W2	Arizona	82

National Championship Game
SE2	Duke	72
MW1	Arkansas	76

== Broadcast information ==
On television, CBS Sports covered all 63 games of the tournament, with regional splits until the Regional Finals followed by national telecasts.

Exclusive national radio coverage was provided by CBS Radio Sports.

=== CBS announcers ===
- James Brown or Jim Nantz and Billy Packer – Brown/Packer, First & Second Round at Uniondale, New York; Nantz/Packer, Midwest Regional at Dallas, Texas; Final Four at Charlotte, North Carolina
- Dick Stockton and Al McGuire – First & Second Round at Lexington, Kentucky; West Regional at Los Angeles
- Greg Gumbel/Bill Raftery/Lesley Visser – First & Second Round at Landover, Maryland; Southeast Regional at Knoxville, Tennessee
- Verne Lundquist and Dan Bonner or Clark Kellogg – Lundquist/Bonner, First & Second Round at St. Petersburg, Florida; Lundquist/Kellogg, East Regional at Miami
- Sean McDonough and Derrek Dickey – First & Second Round at Wichita, Kansas
- Ted Robinson and Greg Kelser – First & Second Round at Oklahoma City
- Tim Ryan and Ann Meyers – First & Second Round at Ogden, Utah
- Dave Sims and Larry Farmer – First & Second Round at Sacramento, California

=== Local radio ===
Region	Seed	Teams	Flagship station	Play-by-play announcer	Color analyst(s)
West	1				
West	2				
West	3				
West	4	Syracuse	WSYR–AM 570 (Syracuse, NY)		
West	5	California	KSFO–AM 560 (Berkeley, CA)		
West	6				
West	7				
West	8				
West	9				
West	10				
West	11				
West	12	UW–Green Bay	WDUZ–AM 1400 (Green Bay, WI)		
West	13				
West	14				
West	15				
West	16				

== See also ==
- 1994 NCAA Division II men's basketball tournament
- 1994 NCAA Division III men's basketball tournament
- 1994 NCAA Division I women's basketball tournament
- 1994 National Invitation Tournament
- 1994 NAIA Division I men's basketball tournament
- 1994 NAIA Division II men's basketball tournament
- 1994 NAIA Division I women's basketball tournament
