= 1993–94 Iowa Hawkeyes men's basketball team =

American college basketball season

1993–94 Iowa Hawkeyes men's basketball

Amana-Hawkeye Classic Champions
- Conference: Big Ten Conference
- Record: 11–16 (5–13 Big Ten)
- Head coach: Tom Davis (8th season)
- Assistant coach: Gary Close
- MVP: James Winters
- Home arena: Carver-Hawkeye Arena (Capacity: 15,500)

1993–94 Big Ten Conference men's basketball standings
	Conf.				Overall
Team	W		L	PCT	W		L	PCT
No. 3 Purdue	14	–	4	.778	29	–	5	.853
No. 11 Michigan	13	–	5	.722	24	–	8	.750
No. 18 Indiana	12	–	6	.667	21	–	9	.700
No. 23 Minnesota	10	–	8	.556	21	–	12	.636
Michigan State	10	–	8	.556	20	–	12	.625
Illinois	10	–	8	.556	17	–	11	.607
Wisconsin	8	–	10	.444	18	–	11	.621
Penn State	6	–	12	.333	13	–	14	.481
Ohio State	6	–	12	.333	13	–	16	.448
Northwestern	5	–	13	.278	15	–	14	.517
Iowa	5	–	13	.278	11	–	16	.407
Rankings from AP Poll; *Minnesota vacated all NCAA tournament games due to sanctions against the program. Disputed record (22-13)

The 1993–94 Iowa Hawkeyes men's basketball team represented the University of Iowa as members of the Big Ten Conference. The team was led by eighth-year head coach Tom Davis and played their home games at Carver-Hawkeye Arena. They ended the season 11–16 overall and 5–13 in Big Ten play.

== Roster ==
1993–94 Iowa Hawkeyes men's basketball team
Players
Coaches

Pos.	#	Name	Height	Weight	Year	Hometown
G	3	Kenyon Murray	6 ft 5 in (1.96 m)	—	So	Battle Creek, Michigan
F	4	Jess Settles	6 ft 7 in (2.01 m)	—	Fr	Winfield, Iowa
G	10	Kevin Smith	5 ft 11 in (1.8 m)	—	Sr	Fort Worth, Texas
G	11	Kevin Skillet	6 ft 3 in (1.91 m)	180 lb (82 kg)	Jr	Silvis, Illinois
G	13	Mon'ter Glasper	5 ft 11 in (1.8 m)	—	So	Albion, Michigan
G	14	Chris Kingsbury	6 ft 5 in (1.96 m)	—	Fr	Hamilton, Ohio
F	23	James Winters	6 ft 5 in (1.96 m)	—	Sr	Joliet, Illinois
F	44	Jim Bartels	6 ft 6 in (1.98 m)	—	Sr	Freedom, Wisconsin
F/C	52	Russ Millard	6 ft 8 in (2.03 m)	—	So	Cedar Rapids, Iowa

Head coach

- Tom Davis (UW–Platteville)

Assistant coach(es)

- Gary Close

Legend

- (C) Team captain
- (S) Suspended
- (I) Ineligible
- (W) Walk-on
- Injured
- Current redshirt

== Schedule/results ==
Date time, TV	Rank^{#}	Opponent^{#}	Result	Record	Site city, state
Non-conference regular season
11/30/1993*		Drake; Iowa Big Four	W 90-86	1-0	Carver-Hawkeye Arena; Iowa City, IA
12/7/1993*		at Northern Iowa; Iowa Big Four	W 81-76	4-0	UNI-Dome; Cedar Falls, IA
Big Ten Regular Season
1/8/1994		No. 13 Michigan	L 70-71	6-5 (0-2)	Carver-Hawkeye Arena (15,500); Iowa City, IA
1/11/1994		No. 11 Indiana	L 75-89	6-6 (0-3)	Carver-Hawkeye Arena (15,500); Iowa City, IA
2/2/1994		Minnesota	W 92-88	9-8 (3-5)	Carver-Hawkeye Arena (15,500); Iowa City, IA
2/19/1994		Illinois	W 83-69	10-11 (4-8)	Carver-Hawkeye Arena (15,500); Iowa City, IA
*Non-conference game. ^{#}Rankings from AP Poll. (#) Tournament seedings in parentheses.
