= 1993–94 Illinois Fighting Illini men's basketball team =

American college basketball season

1993–94 Illinois Fighting Illini men's basketball

Illini Classic, Champion

NCAA men's Division I tournament, first round
- Conference: Big Ten Conference
- Record: 17–11 (10–8 Big Ten)
- Head coach: Lou Henson (19th season)
- Assistant coaches: Dick Nagy (15th season); Jimmy Collins (11th season); Mark Coomes (9th season)
- MVP: Deon Thomas
- Captains: Tom Michael; Deon Thomas; T.J. Wheeler
- Home arena: Assembly Hall

1993–94 Big Ten Conference men's basketball standings
	Conf.				Overall
Team	W		L	PCT	W		L	PCT
No. 3 Purdue	14	–	4	.778	29	–	5	.853
No. 11 Michigan	13	–	5	.722	24	–	8	.750
No. 18 Indiana	12	–	6	.667	21	–	9	.700
No. 23 Minnesota	10	–	8	.556	21	–	12	.636
Michigan State	10	–	8	.556	20	–	12	.625
Illinois	10	–	8	.556	17	–	11	.607
Wisconsin	8	–	10	.444	18	–	11	.621
Penn State	6	–	12	.333	13	–	14	.481
Ohio State	6	–	12	.333	13	–	16	.448
Northwestern	5	–	13	.278	15	–	14	.517
Iowa	5	–	13	.278	11	–	16	.407
Rankings from AP Poll; *Minnesota vacated all NCAA tournament games due to sanctions against the program. Disputed record (22-13)

The 1993–94 Illinois Fighting Illini men's basketball team represented the University of Illinois.

== Regular season ==
The 1993–94 season saw Illinois again advance to the NCAA tournament and in the process, senior Deon Thomas broke a 13-year-old record and became the school's all-time leading scorer. Thomas scored his record-breaking 1,693rd point in the championship game of the Illini/Pepsi Classic against American University and he went on to finish his career with 2,129 points. Also during this season, a young upstart freshman, Kiwane Garris, would begin his assault on the all-time scoring list. He notched 446 points as a freshman and would be the catalyst on the Illini team over the next few years.

=== Roster ===
1993–94 Illinois Fighting Illini men's basketball team
Players
Coaches

Pos.	#	Name	Height	Weight	Year	Previous school	Hometown
G	3	Greg Phillips	6 ft 3 in (1.91 m)	180 lb (82 kg)	Fr	Aurora Christian High School	Aurora, Illinois
G	22	Kiwane Garris	6 ft 2 in (1.88 m)	175 lb (79 kg)	Fr	Westinghouse High School	Chicago, Illinois
G	24	Richard Keene	6 ft 6 in (1.98 m)	200 lb (91 kg)	So	Collinsville High School	Collinsville, Illinois
F/C	25	Deon Thomas (C)	6 ft 9 in (2.06 m)	240 lb (109 kg)	RS Sr	Simeon High School	Chicago, Illinois
F	30	Robert Bennett	6 ft 6 in (1.98 m)	210 lb (95 kg)	Jr	Julian High School	Chicago, Illinois
C	31	Brett Robisch (redshirt)	6 ft 11 in (2.11 m)	225 lb (102 kg)	Fr	Calvary Academy	Springfield, Illinois
F	32	Tom Michael (C)	6 ft 8 in (2.03 m)	220 lb (100 kg)	RS Sr	Carlyle High School	Hoffman, Illinois
F	34	Brian Johnson (redshirt)	6 ft 6 in (1.98 m)	190 lb (86 kg)	Fr	Maine West High School	Des Plaines, Illinois
F/C	35	Shelly Clark	6 ft 9 in (2.06 m)	260 lb (118 kg)	Jr	South Shore High School	Chicago, Illinois
F	40	Jerry Hester	6 ft 6 in (1.98 m)	190 lb (86 kg)	Fr	Manual High School	Peoria, Illinois
G	42	Gene Cross	6 ft 3 in (1.91 m)	180 lb (82 kg)	Sr	Rich Central High School	Olympia Fields, Illinois
G	44	T.J. Wheeler (C)	6 ft 4 in (1.93 m)	200 lb (91 kg)	Sr	Christopher High School	Buckner, Illinois
F	45	Chris Gandy	6 ft 9 in (2.06 m)	205 lb (93 kg)	RS Fr	Bradley-Bourbonnais High School	Kankakee, Illinois
C	52	Steve Roth	6 ft 10 in (2.08 m)	255 lb (116 kg)	Jr	East High School	Belleville, Illinois

Head coach

- Lou Henson (New Mexico A&M) (19th year)

Assistant coach(es)

- Dick Nagy (New Mexico State University) (15th year)
- Jimmy Collins (New Mexico State University) (11th year)
- Mark Coomes (New Mexico State University) (9th year)

Legend

- (C) Team captain
- (S) Suspended
- (I) Ineligible
- (W) Walk-on
- Injured
- Current redshirt

Roster

== Schedule ==
Date time, TV	Rank^{#}	Opponent^{#}	Result	Record	Site (attendance) city, state
Non-Conference regular season
12/1/1993*	No. 16	LaSalle	W 99–73	1–0	Assembly Hall (12,831); Champaign, IL
12/4/1993*	No. 16	Illinois-Chicago	W 101–80	2–0	Assembly Hall (16,321); Champaign, IL
12/7/1993*	No. 16	at Marquette	L 65–74	2–1	Bradley Center (14,195); Milwaukee, WI
12/10/1993*	No. 16	Morehead State; Illini Classic	W 110–75	3–1	Assembly Hall (13,914); Champaign, IL
12/11/1993*	No. 16	American; Illini Classic	W 108–84	4–1	Assembly Hall (14,523); Champaign, IL
12/18/1993*	No. 19	Chicago State	W 121–52	5–1	Assembly Hall (14,023); Champaign, IL
12/20/1993*	No. 19	Jackson State	W 79–63	6–1	Assembly Hall (11,997); Champaign, IL
12/22/1993*	No. 19	vs. Missouri; Braggin' Rights	L 107–108 ^{3ot}	6–2	St. Louis Arena (18,273); St. Louis, MO
1/2/1994*	No. 22	Texas	W 83–78	7–2	Assembly Hall (16,129); Champaign, IL
Big Ten regular season
1/8/1994	No. 21	at Michigan State	L 74–79	7–3 (0–1)	Breslin Student Events Center (12,118); East Lansing, MI
1/12/1994		Northwestern; Rivalry	W 81–53	8–3 (1–1)	Assembly Hall (14,229); Champaign, IL
1/15/1994		at Ohio State	W 83–75	9–3 (2–1)	St. John Arena (13,276); Columbus, OH
1/19/1994		Iowa; Rivalry	W 105–90	10–3 (3–1)	Assembly Hall (16,011); Champaign, IL
1/23/1994		No. 15 Michigan	L 70–74	10–4 (3–2)	Assembly Hall (16,321); Champaign, IL
1/25/1994		at No. 16 Wisconsin	L 56–66	10–5 (3–3)	Wisconsin Field House (11,500); Madison, WI
1/30/1994		No. 11 Indiana; Rivalry	W 88–81	11–5 (4–3)	Assembly Hall (16,321); Champaign, IL
2/2/1994		at Penn State	W 83–65	12–5 (5–3)	Rec Hall (7,103); University Park, PA
2/9/1994	No. 24	Michigan State	W 72–64	13–5 (6–3)	Assembly Hall (14,676); Champaign, IL
2/12/1994	No. 24	at Northwestern; Rivalry	L 68–79	13–6 (6–4)	Welsh-Ryan Arena (8,117); Evanston, IL
2/15/1994		Ohio State	W 80–68	14–6 (7–4)	Assembly Hall (15,096); Champaign, IL
2/19/1994		at Iowa; Rivalry	L 69–83	14–7 (7–5)	Carver–Hawkeye Arena (15,500); Iowa City, IA
2/22/1994		at No. 3 Michigan	L 70–79	14–8 (7–6)	Crisler Arena (13,548); Ann Arbor, MI
2/27/1994		Wisconsin	W 76–65	15–8 (8–6)	Assembly Hall (16,321); Champaign, IL
3/1/1994		at No. 17 Indiana; Rivalry	L 77–82	15–9 (8–7)	Assembly Hall (17,066); Bloomington, IN
3/5/1994		Penn State	W 84–59	16–9 (9–7)	Assembly Hall (16,321); Champaign, IL
3/9/1994		at No. 20 Minnesota	W 90–75	17–9 (10–7)	Williams Arena (15,267); Minneapolis, MN
3/13/1994		at No. 6 Purdue	L 77–87	17–10 (10–8)	Mackey Arena (14,123); West Lafayette, IN
NCAA tournament
3/18/1994*	(8 MW) No. 18	vs. (9 MW) Georgetown; First Round	L 77–84	17–11	Myriad Gardens (13,336); Oklahoma City, OK
*Non-conference game. ^{#}Rankings from AP Poll. (#) Tournament seedings in parentheses. All times are in Central Time.

== Player stats ==
Player	Games Played	2 pt. Field Goals	3 pt. Field Goals	Free Throws	Rebounds	Assists	Blocks	Steals	Points
Deon Thomas	28	206	1	133	194	43	37	23	548
Kiwane Garris	28	104	29	151	98	107	1	33	446
T.J. Wheeler	26	69	30	61	119	97	3	22	289
Shelly Clark	26	97	0	54	166	33	6	15	248
Jerry Hester	28	66	21	32	111	43	6	19	227
Richard Keene	28	33	48	14	97	113	4	30	224
Robert Bennett	28	49	0	43	103	10	6	16	141
Tom Michael	26	11	30	11	45	21	4	4	123
Chris Gandy	19	23	1	15	36	5	8	3	64
Steve Roth	16	10	0	5	25	2	4	3	25
Gene Cross	15	1	2	5	3	5	0	2	13

== Awards and honors ==
- Deon Thomas
  - Associated Press Honorable Mention All-American
  - Fighting Illini All-Century team (2005)
  - Team Most Valuable Player

== Team players drafted into the NBA ==
Player	NBA Club	Round	Pick
Deon Thomas	Dallas Mavericks	2	1
