= 1993–94 Texas Longhorns men's basketball team =

American college basketball season

1993–94 Texas Longhorns men's basketball

SWC tournament champions SWC Regular season champions

NCAA tournament, second round
- Conference: Southwest Conference

Ranking
- Coaches: No. 24
- AP: No. 20
- Record: 26–8 (12–2 SWC)
- Head coach: Tom Penders (6th season)
- Home arena: Frank Erwin Center

1993–94 Southwest Conference men's basketball standings
	Conf.				Overall
Team	W		L	PCT	W		L	PCT
No. 20 Texas †	12	–	2	.857	26	–	8	.765
Texas A&M	10	–	4	.714	19	–	11	.633
Texas Tech	10	–	4	.714	17	–	11	.607
Baylor	7	–	7	.500	16	–	11	.593
Rice	6	–	8	.429	15	–	14	.517
Houston	5	–	9	.357	8	–	19	.296
SMU	3	–	11	.214	6	–	21	.222
TCU	3	–	11	.214	7	–	20	.259
† 1994 SWC tournament winner Rankings from AP Poll

The 1993–94 Texas Longhorns men's basketball team represented The University of Texas at Austin in intercollegiate basketball competition during the 1993–94 season. The Longhorns were led by fourth-year head coach Tom Penders. The team finished the season with a 26–8 overall record and finished atop the standings in Southwest Conference play with a 12–2 conference record. Texas advanced to the NCAA tournament, defeating No. 11 seed Western Kentucky in the opening round before falling to No. 3 seed Michigan in the second round.

== Roster ==
1993–94 Texas Longhorns men's basketball team
Players
Coaches

Pos.	#	Name	Height	Weight	Year	Hometown
G	10	B. J. Tyler	6 ft 1 in (1.85 m)	180 lb (82 kg)	Sr	Port Arthur, Texas
G	12	Roderick Anderson	5 ft 10 in (1.78 m)	165 lb (75 kg)	Jr	Baton Rouge, Louisiana
G	15	Terrence Rencher	6 ft 3 in (1.91 m)	175 lb (79 kg)	Jr	The Bronx, New York
G	32	Reggie Freeman	6 ft 6 in (1.98 m)	210 lb (95 kg)	Fr	The Bronx, New York

Head coach

- Tom Penders (Connecticut)

Assistant coach(es)

Legend

- (C) Team captain
- (S) Suspended
- (I) Ineligible
- (W) Walk-on
- Injured
- Current redshirt

== Schedule and results ==
Date time, TV	Rank^{#}	Opponent^{#}	Result	Record	Site (attendance) city, state
Non-conference regular season
Nov 26, 1993*		at LSU	L 66–86	0–1	Maravich Assembly Center; Baton Rouge, Louisiana
Nov 28, 1993*		at Nebraska	W 78–75	1–1	Bob Devaney Sports Center; Lincoln, Nebraska
Dec 1, 1993*		at Stephen F. Austin	W 78–66	2–1	William R. Johnson Coliseum; Nacogdoches, Texas
Dec 4, 1993*		Florida	L 68–76	2–2	Frank Erwin Center; Austin, Texas
Dec 15, 1993*		at No. 16 Connecticut	L 86–96	2–3	Gampel Pavilion; Storrs, Connecticut
Dec 21, 1993*		vs. No. 5 Kentucky; Maui Invitational tournament	L 61–86	2–4	Lahaina Civic Center; Lahaina, Hawaii
Dec 22, 1993*		vs. Tennessee Tech; Maui Invitational Tournament	W 97–85	3–4	Lahaina Civic Center; Lahaina, Hawaii
Dec 23, 1993*		vs. Notre Dame; Maui Invitational Tournament	W 89–72	4–4	Lahaina Civic Center; Lahaina, Hawaii
Dec 27, 1993*		Oklahoma	W 87–75	5–4	Frank Erwin Center; Austin, Texas
Dec 29, 1993*		Utah	W 93–91 ^{2OT}	6–4	Frank Erwin Center; Austin, Texas
Jan 2, 1994*		at No. 22 Illinois	L 78–83	6–5	Assembly Hall; Champaign, Illinois
Jan 5, 1994*		vs. UTSA	W 91–69	7–5	HemisFair Arena; San Antonio, Texas
SWC Regular season
Jan 12, 1994*		at Texas A&M	L 84–85	7–6 (0–1)	G. Rollie White Coliseum; College Station, Texas
Jan 15, 1994		SMU	W 91–79	8–6 (1–1)	Frank Erwin Center; Austin, Texas
Jan 19, 1994		at Baylor	W 110–85	9–6 (2–1)	Ferrell Center; Waco, Texas
Jan 21, 1994		Texas Tech	W 108–79	10–6 (3–1)	Frank Erwin Center; Austin, Texas
Jan 23, 1994*		Georgia	W 107–96	11–6	Frank Erwin Center; Austin, Texas
Jan 29, 1994		at Houston	W 110–78	12–6 (4–1)	Hofheinz Pavilion; Houston, Texas
Feb 1, 1994		Rice	W 85–70	13–6 (5–1)	Frank Erwin Center; Austin, Texas
Feb 5, 1994		TCU	W 95–73	14–6 (6–1)	Frank Erwin Center; Austin, Texas
Feb 9, 1994		at SMU	W 94–66	15–6 (7–1)	Moody Coliseum; Dallas, Texas
Feb 12, 1994		Texas A&M	W 85–68	16–6 (8–1)	Frank Erwin Center; Austin, Texas
Feb 15, 1994		Baylor	W 113–91	17–6 (9–1)	Frank Erwin Center; Austin, Texas
Feb 19, 1994		at Texas Tech	L 125–128 ^{2OT}	17–7 (9–2)	Lubbock Municipal Coliseum; Lubbock, Texas
Feb 21, 1994*		Lamar	W 105–75	18–7	Frank Erwin Center; Austin, Texas
Feb 26, 1994		Houston	W 88–70	19–7 (10–2)	Frank Erwin Center; Austin, Texas
Feb 28, 1994*		Oral Roberts	W 106–69	20–7	Frank Erwin Center; Austin, Texas
Mar 2, 1994*		Rice	W 78–70	21–7 (11–2)	Tudor Fieldhouse; Houston, Texas
Mar 5, 1994		at TCU	W 111–78	22–7 (12–2)	Daniel-Meyer Coliseum; Fort Worth, Texas
Southwest Conference tournament
Mar 10, 1994*		vs. TCU; Quarterfinals	W 96–75	23–7	Reunion Arena; Dallas, Texas
Mar 11, 1994*		vs. Rice; Semifinals	W 101–89	24–7	Reunion Arena; Dallas, Texas
Mar 12, 1994*		vs. Texas A&M; Championship game	W 87–62	25–7	Reunion Arena; Dallas, Texas
1994 NCAA Tournament – East No. 6 seed
Mar 17, 1994*		vs. Western Kentucky; First Round	W 91–77	26–7	Kansas Coliseum
Mar 19, 1994*		vs. No. 11 Michigan; Second Round	L 79–84	26–8	Kansas Coliseum
*Non-conference game. ^{#}Rankings from AP poll. (#) Tournament seedings in parentheses. MW=Midwest. All times are in Central Standard Time.
