= Darrel Johnson =

American basketball coach

Biographical details
- Born: February 21, 1955

Playing career
- 1973–1976: Tulsa
- 1976–1977: Bethany Nazarene

Coaching career (HC unless noted)
- 1982–1985: Oklahoma State (assistant)
- 1985–1990: Oklahoma Baptist
- 1990–1992: Oklahoma City
- 1992–1994: Baylor

Head coaching record
- Overall: 183–101

Accomplishments and honors

Championships
- 2 NAIA tournament (1991, 1992)

Darrel Johnson (born February 21, 1955) is a former college basketball coach. He was head coach of the Baylor Bears team from 1992 to 1994. He was previously head coach at Oklahoma Baptist University from 1985 to 1990 and at Oklahoma City University from 1990 to 1992. After being fired in a scandal over violation of NCAA rules, he became a scout for the Charlotte Bobcats and basketball coach and director of athletics at The Woodlands Christian Academy. He later became a scout for the New Orleans Pelicans, the Los Angeles Clippers, and the Phoenix Suns

Johnson attended Putnam City High School in Oklahoma City, Oklahoma. He played professional basketball in Europe for a year and then worked as a high school basketball coach at Putnam City North and Ada, winning the 1982 3A state championship . From 1982 to 1985 he was an assistant coach at Oklahoma State University. He was head coach at Oklahoma Baptist University from 1985 to 1990.

He was head basketball coach at Oklahoma City University from 1990 to 1992. The team had a 73–3 record and won the NAIA Men's Basketball Championship both years, winning 56 consecutive games while at OCU. He was known for a fast-paced style of play.

Johnson was head coach of men's basketball at Baylor from May 1992 to November 1994, when he was dismissed because of accusations of violations of NCAA regulations in the program. Johnson was cleared of all charges, but Baylor sued him in November 1995 for damages. That lawsuit was withdrawn in February 1996 after Johnson accepted responsibility for "improprieties" in the program while he was head coach.

Beginning in the early 2000s, Johnson worked for the Charlotte Bobcats as a personnel staffer and scout. In 2005–09 he was head boys' basketball coach at The Woodlands Christian Academy, near Houston, also becoming athletic director in 2007; his record there was 109–16, and the school won the district title all four years and went to the state final four three times, winning the State Title in 2008 and 2009. After retiring from coaching at TWCA, he continued his scouting career with the New Orleans Pelicans for 6 years, before accepting a similar position with the Los Angeles Clippers. Johnson retired from the Clippers in 2022, but resurfaced with the Phoenix Suns in 2023. He retired again in July 2024 and currently lives in Edmond, Oklahoma with his wife, Beth Johnson.

Johnson retired with an overall head coaching record of 336-128, and published his debut book in 2025, a faith based memoir entitled, It’s Only a Game

== Head coaching record ==
Record table
Season	Team	Overall	Conference	Standing	Postseason
Oklahoma Baptist Bison (Sooner Athletic Conference) (1985–1990)
1985–86	Oklahoma Baptist	15–15	–		
1986–87	Oklahoma Baptist	15–15	–		
1987–88	Oklahoma Baptist	16–15	–		
1988–89	Oklahoma Baptist	16–15	–		
1989–90	Oklahoma Baptist	16–16	–		
Oklahoma Baptist:		78–76 (.506)	–		
Oklahoma City Chiefs (Sooner Athletic Conference) (1990–1992)
1990–91	Oklahoma City	35–3	–	1st	NAIA Champion
1991–92	Oklahoma City	38–0	–	1st	NAIA Champion
Oklahoma City:		73–3 (.961)	–		
Baylor Bears (Southwest Conference) (1992–1994)
1992–93	Baylor	16–11	7–7	4th	
1993–94	Baylor	16–11	7–7	4th	
Baylor:		32–22 (.593)	14–14 (.500)		
Total:		183–101 (.644)			
National champion Postseason invitational champion Conference regular season champion Conference regular season and conference tournament champion Division regular season champion Division regular season and conference tournament champion Conference tournament champion
