= Loyola Greyhounds men's basketball statistical leaders =

The Loyola Greyhounds basketball statistical leaders are individual statistical leaders of the Loyola Greyhounds men's basketball program in various categories, including points, rebounds, assists, steals, and blocks. Within those areas, the lists identify single-game, single-season, and career leaders. The Greyhounds represent Loyola University Maryland in the NCAA's Patriot League.

Loyola began competing in intercollegiate basketball in 1908. However, the school's record book does not generally list records from before the 1950s, as records from before this period are often incomplete and inconsistent. Since scoring was much lower in this era, and teams played much fewer games during a typical season, it is likely that few or no players from this era would appear on these lists anyway.

The NCAA did not officially record assists as a stat until the 1983–84 season, and blocks and steals until the 1985–86 season, but Loyola's record books includes players in these stats before these seasons. These lists are updated through the end of the 2020–21 season.

== Scoring ==
Career
Rk	Player	Points	Seasons
1	Jim Lacy	2,199	1943–44 1946–47 1947–48 1948–49
2	Kevin Green	2,154	1988–89 1989–90 1990–91 1991–92
3	Andrew Kostecka III	1,751	2016–17 2017–18 2018–19 2019–20
4	David Gately	1,704	1983–84 1984–85 1985–86 1986–87
5	Jason Rowe	1,703	1996–97 1997–98 1998–99 1999–00
6	Mike Morrison	1,697	1985–861986–87 1987–88 1988–89
7	Andre Walker	1,682	2014–15 2015–16 2016–17 2017–18
8	Mike Krawczyk	1,676	1968–69 1969–70 1970–71 1971–72
9	Dylon Cormier	1,659	2010–11 2011–12 2012–13 2013–14
10	Mike Powell	1,580	1995–96 1996–97 1997–98

Season
Rk	Player	Points	Season
1	Andre Collins	731	2005–06
2	Andrew Kostecka III	682	2018–19
3	Jim Lacy	676	1946–47
4	Mike Morrison	666	1987–88
5	Mike Powell	643	1997–98
	Gerald Brown	643	2006–07
7	Kevin Green	620	1990–91
8	Gerald Brown	613	2007–08
9	Jason Rowe	612	1998–99
10	Mike Morrison	611	1988–89

Single game
Rk	Player	Points	Season	Opponent
1	Jim Lacy	44	1947–48	Western Maryland
2	Joel Hittleman	44	1953–54	Catholic
3	Andre Walker	43	2017–18	Lafayette
4	Paul Dodd	41	1956–57	Western Maryland
	Jamal Barney	41	2008–09	Canisius
6	Jamal Barney	40	2008–09	New Jersey Institute
7	Joel Hittleman	39	1953–54	Georgetown
	Kevin Green	39	1990–91	Niagara
	Mike Powell	39	1997–98	Saint Peter's
	Andre Collins	39	2005–06	Manhattan
	Andre Collins	39	2005–06	Providence

== Rebounds ==
Career
Rk	Player	Rebounds	Seasons
1	Mike Krawczyk	1,278	1968–69 1969–70 1970–71 1971–72
2	Farrell Fenzel	879	1966–67 1967–68 1968–69 1969–70
3	Cam Gregory	876	2014–15 2015–16 2016–17 2017–18
	Golden Dike	876	2019–20 2020–21 2021–22 2022–23 2023–24
5	Mark Rohde	836	1972–73 1973–74 1974–75 1975–76
6	Brian Carroll	754	1997–98 1998–99 1999–00 2000–01
7	Jimmy Smith	749	1972–73 1973–74 1974–75 1975–76
8	Ed Butler	747	1969–70 1970–71 1971–72 1972–73
9	Roderick Platt	745	1995–96 1996–97 1997–98 1998–99
10	B.J. Pendleton	708	1991–92 1992–93 1993–94 1994–95

Season
Rk	Player	Rebounds	Season
1	Charles McCullough	616	1954–55
2	Mike Krawczyk	358	1971–72
3	Dennis McGuire	327	1957–58
4	Farrell Fenzel	321	1967–68
5	Mike Krawczyk	308	1970–71
6	Mike Krawczyk	307	1968–69
7	Mike Krawczyk	305	1969–70
8	Kevin Carter	304	1985–86
9	Brian Carroll	286	2000–01
10	Ed Butler	278	1970–71

Single game
Rk	Player	Rebounds	Season	Opponent
1	Charles McCullough	44	1954–55	Western Maryland
2	Santi Aldama	22	2020–21	Lafayette
3	Jimmy Smith	21	1975–76	American
4	Mike Krawczyk	19	1970–71	Western Maryland
	Mike Krawczyk	19	1970–71	Towson
	Brian Carroll	19	2000–01	Marist
7	Mike Krawczyk	18	1971–72	Mount St. Mary's
	Omari Israel	18	2007–08	Siena
	Santi Aldama	18	2020–21	Lehigh
	Golden Dike	18	2021–22	South Carolina State
	D'Andre Harrison	18	2026–27	Morgan State

== Assists ==
Career
Rk	Player	Assists	Seasons
1	Tracy Bergan	538	1989–90 1990–91 1991–92 1993–94
2	Brian Rudolph	527	2007–08 2008–09 2009–10 2010–11
3	Jason Rowe	486	1996–97 1997–98 1998–99 1999–00
4	Kevin Robinson	424	1971–72 1972–73 1973–74 1974–75
5	Kenneth Jones	413	2018–19 2019–20 2020–21 2021–22 2022–23
6	Andre Walker	393	2014–15 2015–16 2016–17 2017–18
7	Tom Gormley	386	1983–84 1984–85 1985–86 1986–87
8	Brett Harvey	374	2006–07 2007–08 2008–09 2009–10
9	Damien Jenifer	369	1998–99 1999–00 2000–01 2001–02
10	Ed Butler	364	1969–70 1970–71 1971–72 1972–73

Season
Rk	Player	Assists	Season
1	Ed Butler	178	1971–72
	Tracy Bergan	178	1991–92
3	Kevin Robinson	166	1973–74
4	Tracy Bergan	163	1990–91
5	Jason Rowe	161	1998–99
6	Jason Rowe	152	1997–98
7	Tracy Bergan	146	1993–94
8	Brian Rudolph	145	2008–09
9	Brian Rudolph	143	2007–08
10	Kenneth Jones	139	2021–22

Single game
Rk	Player	Assists	Season	Opponent
1	Ed Butler	16	1971–72	Randolph-Macon
2	Ed Butler	15	1972–73	American
3	Ray Turchi	13	1971–72	Mount St. Mary's
4	Kevin Robinson	12	1973–74	Georgetown
	Brian Rudolph	12	2008–09	Iona
6	Ed Butler	11	1971–72	Johns Hopkins
	Dave Wojcik	11	1988–89	St. Francis (Pa.)
	Tracy Bergan	11	1990–91	Fairfield
	Tracy Bergan	11	1990–91	Niagara
	Tracy Bergan	11	1991–92	Navy
	Brett Harvey	11	2007–08	Manhattan

== Steals ==
Career
Rk	Player	Steals	Seasons
1	Jason Rowe	272	1996–97 1997–98 1998–99 1999–00
2	Andrew Kostecka III	222	2016–17 2017–18 2018–19 2019–20
3	Andre Walker	195	2014–15 2015–16 2016–17 2017–18
4	Dylon Cormier	185	2010–11 2011–12 2012–13 2013–14
5	Tracy Bergan	177	1989–90 1990–91 1991–92 1993–94
6	Damien Jenifer	169	1998–99 1999–00 2000–01 2001–02
	Jaylin Andrews	169	2018–19 2019–20 2020–21 2021–22 2022–23
8	Kenneth Jones	162	2018–19 2019–20 2020–21 2021–22 2022–23
9	Kevin Green	159	1988–89 1989–90 1990–91 1991–92
10	Mike Powell	154	1995–96 1996–97 1997–98

Season
Rk	Player	Steals	Season
1	Jason Rowe	95	1998–99
2	Jason Rowe	86	1997–98
3	Andrew Kostecka III	85	2018–19
4	Tom Gormley	76	1985–86
5	Darius Johnson	68	1993–94
	Cam Spencer	68	2021–22
7	Andre Collins	67	2005–06
8	Tom Gormley	64	1986–87
9	Dylon Cormier	62	2012–13
10	Kenneth Jones	57	2022–23

Single game
Rk	Player	Steals	Season	Opponent
1	Tom Gormley	10	1985–86	Towson
2	Jason Rowe	8	1999–00	UMBC
3	Jason Rowe	7	1997–98	Saint Peter's
	Andre Collins	7	2005–06	Marist
	Andrew Kostecka III	7	2018–19	Army West Point
6	Tracy Bergan	6	1990–91	UMBC
	Michael Reese	6	1991–92	Saint Peter's
	Milton Williams	6	1993–94	Navy
	Darius Johnson	6	1993–94	William & Mary
	Tracy Bergan	6	1993–94	Iona
	Anthony Smith	6	1996–97	UNC Greensboro
	Mike Powell	6	1996–97	Manhattan
	Jason Rowe	6	1997–98	Rider
	Jason Rowe	6	1997–98	Mount St. Mary's
	Mike Powell	6	1997–98	Rider
	Jason Rowe	6	1998–99	Fairfield
	Jason Rowe	6	1998–99	Virginia
	Gerald Brown	6	2007–08	Penn
	Robert Olson	6	2009–10	UMBC
	Anthony Winbush	6	2009–10	Indiana
	R.J. Williams	6	2013–14	Army
	Andrew Kostecka III	6	2017–18	Bucknell
	Andrew Kostecka III	6	2019–20	IUPUI
	Kenny Jones	6	2022–23	UMBC

== Blocks ==
Career
Rk	Player	Blocks	Seasons
1	Brian Carroll	213	1997–98 1998–99 1999–00 2000–01
2	Shane Walker	135	2009–10 2010–11 2011–12
3	Jarred Jones	125	2012–13 2013–14 2014–15 2015–16 2016–17
4	Erik Etherly	121	2010–11 2011–12 2012–13
5	George Sereikas	117	1989–90 1990–91 1991–92 1992–93
6	Jordan Latham	98	2011–12 2012–13 2013–14
7	Andrew Kostecka III	87	2016–17 2017–18 2018–19 2019–20
8	Jawaan Wright	76	2005–06 2006–07 2008–09 2009–10
9	Omari Israel	75	2006–07 2007–08
10	Franz Rassman	69	2012–13 2013–14 2014–15 2015–16
	Cam Gregory	69	2014–15 2015–16 2016–17 2017–18

Season
Rk	Player	Blocks	Season
1	Brian Carroll	89	1999–00
2	Omari Israel	54	2007–08
3	Brian Carroll	50	2000–01
	Erik Etherly	50	2011–12
5	Brian Carroll	48	1998–99
6	Shane Walker	47	2010–11
7	Shane Walker	46	2009–10
8	George Sereikas	44	1991–92
9	Shane Walker	42	2011–12
10	Jarred Jones	41	2013–14

Single game
Rk	Player	Blocks	Season	Opponent
1	Jimmy Smith	11	1975–76	George Mason
2	Brian Carroll	9	1999–00	Rider
3	Brian Carroll	8	1999–00	Rider
4	George Sereikas	7	1990–91	Saint Peter's
	Brian Carroll	7	1999–00	Stony Brook
6	George Sereikas	6	1991–92	UMBC
	Brian Carroll	6	1998–99	Siena
	Brian Carroll	6	1999–00	American
	Brian Carroll	6	1999–00	Niagara
	Shane Walker	6	2009–10	Marist
