= List of Xavier Musketeers men's basketball seasons =

This is a list of seasons completed by the Xavier Musketeers men's college basketball team.

== Seasons ==
Statistics overview
Season	Coach	Overall	Conference	Standing	Postseason
Harry Gilligan (Independent) (1919–1920)
1919–20	Harry Gilligan	0–1			
Harry Gilligan:		0–1 (.000)			
Joe Meyer (Independent) (1920–1933)
1920–21	Joe Meyer	1–2			
1921–22	Joe Meyer	2–4			
1922–23	Joe Meyer	2–0			
1923–24	Joe Meyer	12–4			
1924–25	Joe Meyer	6–7			
1925–26	Joe Meyer	10–8			
1926–27	Joe Meyer	11–3			
1927–28	Joe Meyer	8–1			
1928–29	Joe Meyer	9–6			
1929–30	Joe Meyer	8–8			
1930–31	Joe Meyer	10–3			
1931–32	Joe Meyer	10–3			
1932–33	Joe Meyer	5–3			
Joe Meyer:		94–52 (.644)			
Clem Crowe (Independent) (1933–1943)
1933–34	Clem Crowe	9–1			
1934–35	Clem Crowe	14–4			
1935–36	Clem Crowe	8–7			
1936–37	Clem Crowe	7–7			
1937–38	Clem Crowe	10–9			
1938–39	Clem Crowe	13–7			
1939–40	Clem Crowe	6–17			
1940–41	Clem Crowe	13–9			
1941–42	Clem Crowe	10–8			
1942–43	Clem Crowe	6–10			
Clem Crowe:		96–76 (.558)			
1943–44	No team				
1944–45	No team				
Ed Burns (Independent) (1945–1946)
1945–46	Ed Burns	3–16			
Ed Burns:		3–16 (.158)			
Lew Hirt (Independent) (1946–1951)
1946–47	Lew Hirt	8–17			
1947–48	Lew Hirt	24–8			
1948–49	Lew Hirt	16–10			
1949–50	Lew Hirt	12–16			
1950–51	Lew Hirt	16–10			
Lew Hirt:		76–61 (.555)			
Ned Wulk (Independent) (1952–1957)
1951–52	Ned Wulk	16–10			
1952–53	Ned Wulk	161–12			
1953–54	Ned Wulk	18–12			
1954–55	Ned Wulk	13–13			
1955–56	Ned Wulk	17–11			
1956–57	Ned Wulk	20–8			
Ned Wulk:		89–70 (.560)			
James McCafferty (Independent) (1957–1963)
1957–58	James McCafferty	19–11			NIT Champion
1958–59	James McCafferty	12–13			
1959–60	James McCafferty	17–9			
1960–61	James McCafferty	17–10			NCAA University Division first round
1961–62	James McCafferty	14–12			
1962–63	James McCafferty	12–16			
James McCafferty:		91–71 (.562)			
Don Ruberg (Independent) (1963–1967)
1963–64	Don Ruberg	16–10			
1964–65	Don Ruberg	10–15			
1965–66	Don Ruberg	13–13			
1966–67	Don Ruberg	13–13			
Don Ruberg:		52–51 (.505)			
George Krajack (Independent) (1967–1971)
1967–68	George Krajack	10–16			
1968–69	George Krajack	10–16			
1969–70	George Krajack	5–20			
1970–71	George Krajack	9–17			
George Krajack:		34–69 (.330)			
Dick Campbell (Independent) (1971–1973)
1971–72	Dick Campbell	12–14			
1972–73	Dick Campbell	3–23			
Dick Campbell:		15–37 (.288)			
Tay Baker (Independent) (1973–1979)
1973–74	Tay Baker	8–18			
1974–75	Tay Baker	11–15			
1975–76	Tay Baker	14–12			
1976–77	Tay Baker	10–17			
1977–78	Tay Baker	13–18			
1978–79	Tay Baker	14–13			
Tay Baker:		70–89 (.440)			
Bob Staak (Midwestern City Conference) (1979–1985)
1979–80	Bob Staak	8–18	0–5	6th	
1980–81	Bob Staak	12–16	8–3	1st	
1981–82	Bob Staak	8–20	1–11	7th	
1982–83	Bob Staak	22–8	10–4	T–2nd	NCAA Opening Round
1983–84	Bob Staak	22–11	9–5	3rd	NIT quarterfinal
1984–85	Bob Staak	16–13	7–7	5th	
Bob Staak:		88–86 (.506)	35–35 (.500)		
Pete Gillen (Midwestern Collegiate Conference) (1985–1994)
1985–86	Pete Gillen	25–5	10–2	1st	NCAA first round
1986–87	Pete Gillen	19–13	7–5	T–3rd	NCAA second round
1987–88	Pete Gillen	26–4	9–1	1st	NCAA first round
1988–89	Pete Gillen	21–12	7–5	3rd	NCAA first round
1989–90	Pete Gillen	28–5	12–2	1st	NCAA Sweet Sixteen
1990–91	Pete Gillen	22–10	11–3	1st	NCAA second round
1991–92	Pete Gillen	15–12	7–3	T–2nd	
1992–93	Pete Gillen	24–6	12–2	T–1st	NCAA second round
1993–94	Pete Gillen	22–8	8–2	1st	NIT quarterfinal
Pete Gillen:		202–75 (.729)	83–25 (.769)		
Skip Prosser (Midwestern Collegiate Conference) (1994–1995)
1994–95	Skip Prosser	23–5	14–0	1st	NCAA first round
Skip Prosser (Atlantic 10 Conference) (1995–2001)
1995–96	Skip Prosser	13–15	8–8	3rd (West)	
1996–97	Skip Prosser	23–6	13–3	1st (West)	NCAA second round
1997–98	Skip Prosser	22–8	11–5	T–1st (West)	NCAA first round
1998–99	Skip Prosser	25–11	12–4	2nd (West)	NIT Third Place
1999–00	Skip Prosser	21–12	9–7	T–2nd (West)	NIT second round
2000–01	Skip Prosser	26–6	14–0	1st (West)	NCAA first round
Skip Prosser:		148–65 (.695)	81–27 (.750)		
Thad Matta (Atlantic 10 Conference) (2001–2004)
2001–02	Thad Matta	26–6	14–2	1st (West)	NCAA second round
2002–03	Thad Matta	26–6	15–1	1st (West)	NCAA second round
2003–04	Thad Matta	26–11	10–6	3rd (West)	NCAA Elite Eight
Thad Matta:		78–23 (.772)	39–9 (.976)		
Sean Miller (Atlantic 10 Conference) (2004–2009)
2004–05	Sean Miller	17–12	10–6	T–2nd (West)	
2005–06	Sean Miller	21–11	8–8	T–7th	NCAA first round
2006–07	Sean Miller	25–9	13–3	T–1st	NCAA second round
2007–08	Sean Miller	30–7	14–2	1st	NCAA Elite Eight
2008–09	Sean Miller	27–8	12–4	1st	NCAA Sweet Sixteen
Sean Miller:		120–47 (.719)	57–23 (.713)		
Chris Mack (Atlantic 10 Conference) (2009–2013)
2009–10	Chris Mack	26–9	14–2	T–1st	NCAA Sweet Sixteen
2010–11	Chris Mack	24–8	15–1	1st	NCAA first round
2011–12	Chris Mack	21–12	10–6	T–3rd	NCAA Sweet Sixteen
2012–13	Chris Mack	17–14	9–7	6th	
Chris Mack (Big East) (2013–2018)
2013–14	Chris Mack	21–12	10–8	3rd	NCAA First Four
2014–15	Chris Mack	23–14	9–9	6th	NCAA Sweet Sixteen
2015–16	Chris Mack	28–6	14–4	2nd	NCAA second round
2016–17	Chris Mack	24–14	9–9	7th	NCAA Elite Eight
2017–18	Chris Mack	29–6	15–3	1st	NCAA second round
Chris Mack:		215–97 (.689)	105–49 (.682)		
Travis Steele (Big East) (2018–2022)
2018–19	Travis Steele	19–16	9–9	4th	NIT second round
2019–20	Travis Steele	19–13	8–10	6th	No postseason due to COVID-19 pandemic
2020–21	Travis Steele	13–8	6–7	7th	
2021–22	Travis Steele; Jonas Hayes	23–13^{[Note A]}	8–11	7th	NIT Champion
Travis Steele:		70–50 (.583)	31–37 (.456)		
Sean Miller^{[Note B]} (Big East) (2022–2025)
2022–23	Sean Miller	27–10	15–5	2nd	NCAA Sweet Sixteen
2023–24	Sean Miller	16–18	9–11	T–8th	NIT First Round
2024–25	Sean Miller	22–12	13–7	T–4th	NCAA First Round
Sean Miller:		185–87 (.680)	94–53 (.639)		
Richard Pitino (Big East) (2025–present)
2025–26	Richard Pitino	15–18	6–14	T–10th	
Richard Pitino:		15–18 (.455)	6–14 (.300)		
Total:		1,624–1,097 (.597)			
National champion Postseason invitational champion Conference regular season champion Conference regular season and conference tournament champion Division regular season champion Division regular season and conference tournament champion Conference tournament champion

^A. Travis Steele was fired after 32 games in the 2021–22 season, posting a 19–13 record. Jonas Hayes coached the remaining four games, finishing 4–0.
^B. After leaving Xavier to coach Arizona in 2009, Sean Miller was fired by Arizona in 2021 and rehired by Xavier in 2022.
