= Skip Prosser =

American basketball player and coach (1950–2007)

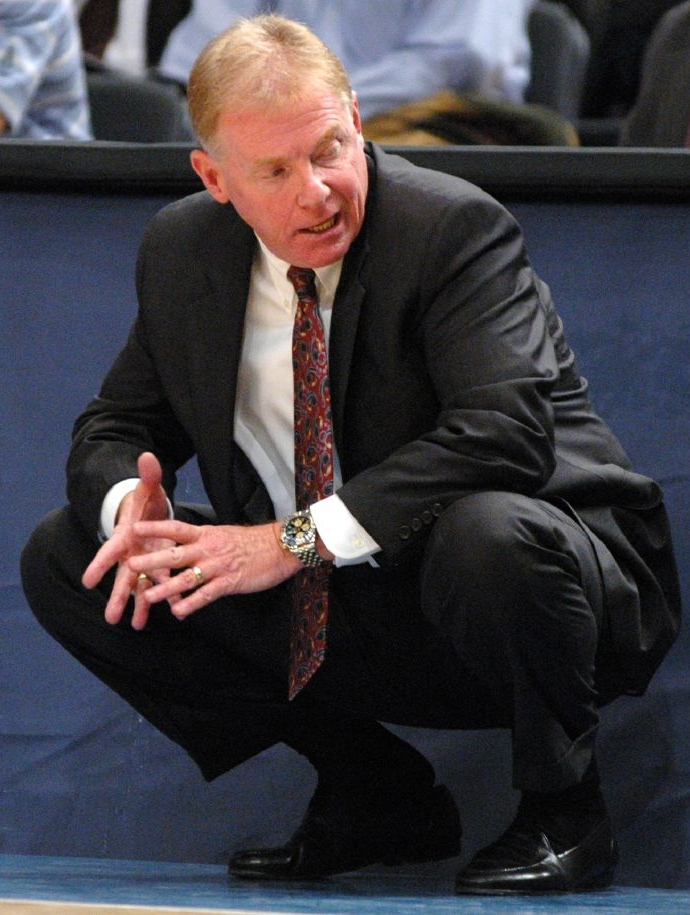

Biographical details
- Born: November 3, 1950; Pittsburgh, Pennsylvania, U.S.
- Died: July 26, 2007 (aged 56); Winston-Salem, North Carolina, U.S.

Playing career
- 1969–1972: Merchant Marine
- Position: Guard

Coaching career (HC unless noted)
- 1977–1979: Linsly Military Institute
- 1979–1985: Wheeling Cent. Catholic HS
- 1985–1993: Xavier (assistant)
- 1993–1994: Loyola (MD)
- 1994–2001: Xavier
- 2001–2007: Wake Forest

Head coaching record
- Overall: 291–146
- Tournaments: 6–9 (NCAA Division I); 5–3 (NIT)

Accomplishments and honors

Championships
- MAAC tournament (1994); MCC regular season (1995); Atlantic 10 regular season (1997); Atlantic 10 tournament (1998); ACC regular season (2003)

Awards
- ACC Coach of the Year (2003); MCC Coach of the Year (1995)

George Edward "Skip" Prosser (November 3, 1950 – July 26, 2007) was an American college basketball coach who was head men's basketball coach at Wake Forest University at the time of his death. He is the only coach in NCAA history to take three separate schools to the NCAA tournament in their first year coaching. In 21 years as a collegiate coach, he made 18 postseason appearances.

Previously, he coached Xavier University for seven seasons, where he achieved great success. He spent his first year coaching at the collegiate level at Loyola College in Maryland, taking the Greyhounds to the team's first modern-day NCAA Tournament appearance.

Prosser was the Atlantic Coast Conference Coach of the Year in 2003.

== Early life ==
Prosser was born and raised in the Pittsburgh, Pennsylvania suburb of Carnegie and graduated from Carnegie High School, where he played football and basketball. He played basketball and rugby union at the United States Merchant Marine Academy where he earned a degree in nautical science in 1972.

Prosser coached at Linsly Military Institute in Wheeling, West Virginia, where he achieved a 38–9 record. He then was hired as a history teacher at Wheeling Central Catholic High School, where he coached his teams to a state championship in 1982, five regional championships and three conference titles over a period of six years and a record of 104–48. Prosser would say later in his career that he would be happy if he were still teaching and coaching at Central Catholic High. One of the players on his championship team was Doug Wojcik, former head coach at the College of Charleston. Prosser earned his master's degree in secondary education from West Virginia University while he taught at Wheeling Central.

== Coaching ==
Prosser coached 15 seasons as head coach at the collegiate level. He began his college coaching career when he was hired by Coach Pete Gillen as an assistant coach for eight seasons at Xavier University in Cincinnati, Ohio, starting with the 1985–86 season, and he became Gillen's top assistant.

His collegiate head coaching career began at Loyola College in Maryland on April 1, 1993. Besides replacing Tom Schneider, who had resigned amid a then-school-worst 2–25 season, Prosser inherited a program that had completed its sixth straight losing campaign. In his only season at Loyola, the Greyhounds finished with a 17–13 overall record and won the Metro Atlantic Athletic Conference Championship to earn its first-ever NCAA Division I tournament berth. He returned to Xavier precisely one year later, on April 1, 1994, to succeed Gillen, who had accepted a similar position at Providence College two days prior. Prosser became the second-winningest coach in Xavier history after Gillen.

Prosser began his career at Wake Forest in 2001 and led the Demon Deacons to the NCAA tournament in each of his first four years there. Prosser is credited for sparking participation in the Wake Forest student Screamin' Demons and increasing attendance with game-time antics, like having the Demon Deacon mascot enter Lawrence Joel on a Harley Davidson and filling the coliseum with Zombie Nation's "Kernkraft 400" at tip-off and when the Deacons would go on a run. During Prosser's tenure as head coach, home season tickets sold out for the first time ever in 2004. During the 2004–05 season, the team was ranked #1 by the Associated Press for the first time in the school's history and won a school-record 27 games. At Wake Forest, Prosser won 100 games faster than all but two ACC coaches. In 2003, his Demon Deacons squad became the first from the ACC to ever lead the nation in rebounding. In the summer of 2007, Prosser had organized what was said to be a top-five recruiting class for the upcoming year.

Prosser was the collegiate coach of current or former NBA players Aaron Williams, James Posey, David West, Josh Howard, Darius Songaila and Chris Paul; he won national recruiting wars for Paul and Eric Williams. He amassed a career record of 291–146 (.666).

Every senior whom Prosser coached earned his degree in four years.

=== Coaching style ===
Prosser's teams were known for their fast tempo and offensive explosiveness.

During his last two troubling seasons, Prosser would quote Thomas Paine, Henry David Thoreau, Friedrich Nietzsche, or William Shakespeare to his players to inspire them. In the spring semester before summer exhibition tours, Prosser would require that every member of his team take a one-credit class on the history of the place they would be visiting. He would also attend the class and write the required term paper.

== Personal life ==
Prosser and his wife Nancy met in Cincinnati. He had two sons, Scott and Mark, who are from his first marriage to Ruth Charles. Mark was formerly the head coach at Division II Brevard College, served as an assistant coach at Winthrop University, and is now head coach at Winthrop University.

An avid sports fan, Prosser was a follower of the Pittsburgh Steelers since childhood and would often find sports bars to watch their games while on the road. He was at Three Rivers Stadium to witness the Immaculate Reception. He also saw Roberto Clemente's 3,000th and final hit, and the last game ever played at Three Rivers Stadium. He once hitchhiked across the country.

Prosser earned a reputation in college basketball for a keen intellect and sense of humor. He enjoyed reading the books of Robert Ludlum, along with biographies and books on history, philosophy, and politics. The athletic director at Loyola, Joe Boylan, said that Prosser was a "renaissance man coaching basketball." Former Xavier player Dwayne Wilson said, "He always liked to read history books, so he was always quoting something—whether it be Winston Churchill or another great author—he was always quoting somebody on something."

Prosser stated, in an interview that aired just after his death, that his favorite quote was from Ralph Waldo Emerson: "He was a transcendentalist in America in the 1830s who said 'Our chief want in life is someone who will make us do what we can.' I thought that was a powerful statement that we need to be around people who challenge us to be as good as we can be."

Since 2009, Prosser's legacy has been celebrated in Winston-Salem, North Carolina, with the annual READ Challenge as part of the Skip Prosser Literacy Program. The READ Challenge, a collaboration between Wake Forest Athletics and the Wake Forest Department of Education with support from the Winston-Salem-based literary nonprofit Bookmarks, encourages and supports reading among fourth-grade students in Winston-Salem/Forsyth County Schools. In the fall of 2019, 1,441 fourth graders from 29 elementary schools participated in the READ Challenge. 903 fourth-graders read 1500 or more minutes before winter break, the highest participation total since 2014.

== Death ==
On July 26, 2007, Prosser collapsed in his office around noon after jogging at the Kentner Stadium track adjacent to his office in the Manchester Athletic Center on Wake Forest's campus. A staff member found him unresponsive around 12:45 pm; medical personnel performed CPR and used a defibrillator in efforts to revive Prosser. He was rushed to Wake Forest University Baptist Medical Center, where he was pronounced dead at 1:41 pm from an apparent "sudden massive heart attack". He was 56 years old.

The announcement of Prosser's death was delayed until later in the day because his wife was traveling to Cincinnati and had not yet been reached. Players were gathered and taken to an off-campus location without their cell phones to guard them from reports of Prosser's death.

Prosser ate lunch the previous day with his predecessor as Wake Forest coach, then University of South Carolina coach Dave Odom. Prosser then ate dinner with his son Mark, who was also in Florida recruiting, before flying to North Carolina Thursday morning.

Two funeral Masses were held for Prosser. The first was on July 31, 2007, at Holy Family Catholic Church in Clemmons, North Carolina, near the Wake Forest campus. (Due to seating limitations, this service was televised by closed circuit television to Wait Chapel on campus). The second Mass was held on August 4, 2007, at the Cintas Center on the campus of Xavier University in Cincinnati. Prosser was then buried at the Spring Grove Cemetery in Cincinnati.

== Head coaching record ==
Record table
| Season | Team | Overall | Conference | Standing | Postseason |
|---|---|---|---|---|---|
Loyola Greyhounds (Metro Atlantic Athletic Conference) (1993–1994)
| 1993–94 | Loyola | 17–13 | 6–8 | 5th | NCAA Division I first round |
| Loyola: | | 17–13 (.567) | 6–8 (.429) | | |
Xavier Musketeers (Midwestern Collegiate Conference) (1994–1995)
| 1994–95 | Xavier | 23–5 | 14–0 | 1st | NCAA Division I first round |
| Xavier: | | 23–5 (.821) | 14–0 (1.000) | | |
Xavier Musketeers (Atlantic 10 Conference) (1995–2001)
| 1995–96 | Xavier | 13–15 | 8–8 | 3rd (West) | |
| 1996–97 | Xavier | 23–6 | 13–3 | 1st (West) | NCAA Division I second round |
| 1997–98 | Xavier | 22–8 | 11–5 | T–1st (West) | NCAA Division I first round |
| 1998–99 | Xavier | 25–11 | 12–4 | 2nd (West) | NIT Third Place |
| 1999–2000 | Xavier | 21–12 | 9–7 | 3rd (West) | NIT second round |
| 2000–01 | Xavier | 21–8 | 12–4 | T–2nd | NCAA Division I first round |
| Xavier: | | 148–65 (.695) | 79–31 (.718) | | |
Wake Forest Demon Deacons (Atlantic Coast Conference) (2001–2007)
| 2001–02 | Wake Forest | 21–13 | 9–7 | T–3rd | NCAA Division I second round |
| 2002–03 | Wake Forest | 25–6 | 13–3 | 1st | NCAA Division I second round |
| 2003–04 | Wake Forest | 21–10 | 9–7 | T–3rd | NCAA Division I Sweet 16 |
| 2004–05 | Wake Forest | 27–6 | 13–3 | 2nd | NCAA Division I second round |
| 2005–06 | Wake Forest | 17–17 | 3–13 | 12th | NIT first round |
| 2006–07 | Wake Forest | 15–16 | 5–11 | T–10th | |
| Wake Forest: | | 126–68 (.649) | 52–44 (.542) | | |
| Total: | | 291–146 (.666) | | | |
National champion Postseason invitational champion Conference regular season champion Conference regular season and conference tournament champion Division regular season champion Division regular season and conference tournament champion Conference tournament champion
