= Jim McCafferty =

American basketball coach (1916–2006)

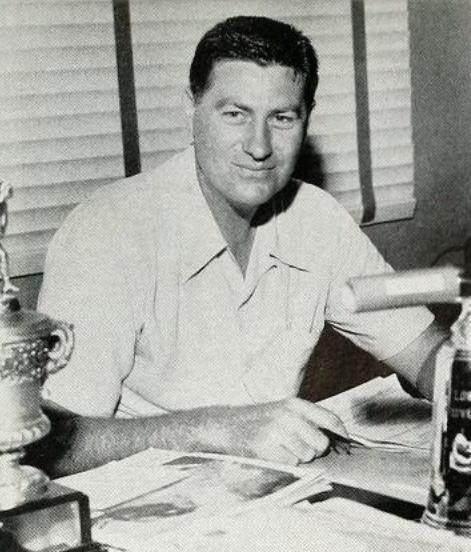
- McCafferty from the 1955 Wolf

Biographical details
- Born: March 14, 1916; Scammon, Kansas, U.S.
- Died: September 18, 2006 (aged 90); Seattle, Washington, U.S.

Playing career
- 1940–1942: Loyola (LA)

Coaching career (HC unless noted)
- 1942–1949: Loyola (LA) (assistant)
- 1949–1950: Loyola (LA)
- 1950–1953: Loyola (LA) (assistant)
- 1953–1957: Loyola (LA)
- 1957–1963: Xavier

Administrative career (AD unless noted)
- 1962–1979: Xavier

Head coaching record
- Overall: 154–131 (.540)
- Tournaments: 0–3 (NCAA); 4–0 (NIT)

Accomplishments and honors

Championships
- NIT (1958)

James Joseph "Big Jim" McCafferty (March 14, 1916 – September 18, 2006) was an American basketball coach for the Loyola Wolf Pack and Xavier Musketeers.

== Early life ==
Showing early signs of his eventual 6'8", 280-pound frame which would earn him the nickname "Big Jim", James Joseph McCafferty was born in Scammon, Kansas, weighing 19 pounds. Shortly thereafter, his family moved to Henryetta, Oklahoma, where McCafferty grew up and played high school football. He was recruited by Loyola of the South to play football, but when the school dropped its football program after his freshman year, he switched to playing basketball for three seasons (1940–43). As a senior, he helped lead Loyola to a Dixie Conference Championship, and was named MVP of the tournament.

== Coaching career ==
After graduating with a degree in physical education in 1942, McCafferty remained at Loyola as the assistant coach in both basketball and track. He was the assistant under Coach Jack Orsley when the Wolfpack won the NAIA championship in 1945. Then in 1948, McCafferty was invited to coach Team USA at the Central American Olympic Games in Panama, and he led the U.S. to a gold medal.

McCafferty became Loyola's head basketball coach in 1953, and led the Wolfpack for four seasons, including Loyola's first two NCAA Tournament appearances in 1954 and 1957. Unfortunately, the Wolfpack lost in the first round in both tournaments. After the 1957 season, he was named head coach at Xavier University.

In his first season at Xavier, McCafferty led the Musketeers to the NIT, which it won against longtime rival Dayton, then coached by legendary Tom Blackburn. Then, in 1961, the Musketeers made it to their first NCAA tournament.

McCafferty was head coach at Xavier for six seasons until 1963. He also served as the school's athletic director from 1962 to 1979.

After trying for over two decades to get Xavier into a Division I Conference, McCafferty's work paid off in 1979 when Xavier became a founding member of the new Midwestern City Conference (MCC), which became the Horizon League in 1985. McCafferty served as the first Commissioner of the MCC during the 1979-80 school year.

== Awards and recognition ==
McCafferty was selected in 1958 as Catholic College Coach of the Year, and Ohio College Coach of the Year. He has been inducted into the Halls of Fame at both Loyola and Xavier, as well as the Cincinnati Basketball Hall of Fame, and twice was designated to receive Loyola's Distinguished Alumnus Award. In 2011, he was awarded a spot in the Sugar Bowl Hall of Fame.

In his honor, the McCafferty Trophy is annually awarded to a school which is recognized as the all-sport champion of the Horizon League. Also, since 1981 the Blackburn/McCafferty Trophy has been awarded to the winner of regular season meetings between rivals Xavier and Dayton. It is named for the two former coaches of the respective schools, who are remembered as the two men who put their respective colleges' basketball teams on the national map.

== Head coaching record ==
Record table
Season	Team	Overall	Conference	Standing	Postseason
Loyola Wolf Pack (Independent) (1949–1950)
1949–50	Loyola	9–15			
Loyola Wolf Pack (Independent) (1953–1957)
1953–54	Loyola	7–8			NCAA First Round
1954–55	Loyola	14–9			
1955–56	Loyola	10–15			
1956–57	Loyola	14–12			NCAA University Division First Round
Loyola:		63–60 (.512)			
Xavier Musketeers (Independent) (1957–1963)
1957–58	Xavier	19–11			NIT Champion
1958–59	Xavier	12–13			
1959–60	Xavier	17–9			
1960–61	Xavier	17–10			NCAA University Division First Round
1961–62	Xavier	14–12			
1962–63	Xavier	12–16			
Xavier:		91–71 (.562)			
Total:		154–131 (.540)			
National champion Postseason invitational champion Conference regular season champion Conference regular season and conference tournament champion Division regular season champion Division regular season and conference tournament champion Conference tournament champion
