= List of Horizon League champions =

Horizon League

Titles per university
Milwaukee	147
Youngstown State	72
Green Bay	66
Wright State	60
Oakland	52
Detroit Mercy	51
Cleveland State	49
IU Indy	9
Northern Kentucky	8
Robert Morris	4
Purdue Fort Wayne	1

Locations
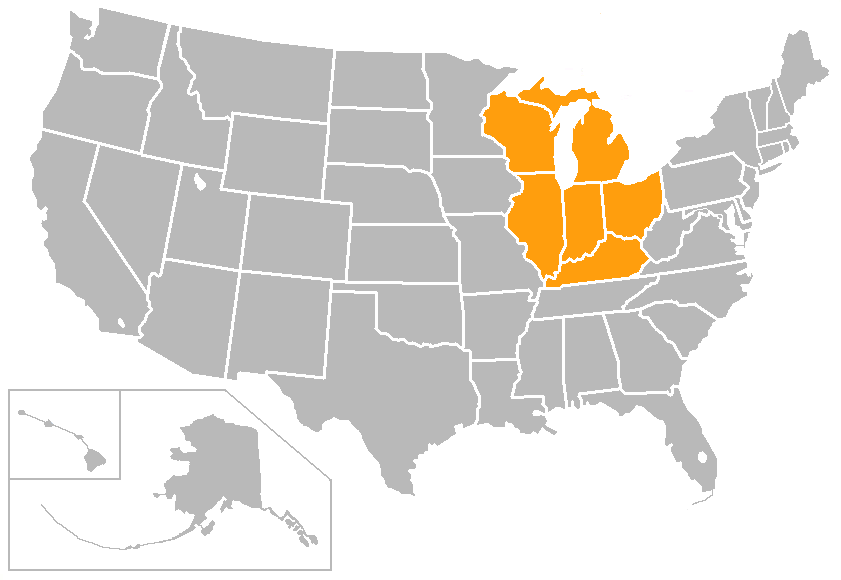

This is an article of Horizon League champions. The Horizon League sponsors 19 sports, 9 men's and 10 women's. This article is partially updated through the 2024-25 NCAA athletic year while other information is updated through December 22, 2017.

Men's sports

- Baseball
- Basketball
- Cross country
- Golf
- Soccer
- Swimming and diving
- Tennis
- Indoor track and field
- Outdoor track and field

Women's sports

- Basketball
- Cross country
- Golf
- Soccer
- Softball
- Swimming and diving
- Tennis
- Indoor track and field
- Outdoor track and field
- Volleyball

== Membership ==
All years listed reflect the calendar years in which each school joined and left the conference. For schools that participated only in fall sports, the year of departure is the calendar year after the last season of competition. For schools that participated only in spring sports, the year of arrival precedes the first season of competition.

=== Current members ===
- Cleveland State Vikings (1994–present)
- Detroit Mercy Titans (1980–present)
- Green Bay Phoenix (1994–present)
- IU Indy Jaguars (2017–present) (Note: IU Indy joined the Horizon League as IUPUI, representing the former Indiana University–Purdue University Indianapolis. IUPUI was dissolved in 2024 and replaced by separate institutions affiliated with the Indiana University and Purdue University systems. The IUPUI athletic program transferred to the new Indiana University Indianapolis with an athletic brand of IU Indy.)
- Milwaukee Panthers (1994–present)
- Northern Kentucky Norse (2015–present)
- Oakland Golden Grizzlies (2013–present)
- Purdue Fort Wayne Mastodons (2020–present)
- Robert Morris Colonials (2020–present)
- Wright State Raiders (1994–present)
- Youngstown State Penguins (2001–present)

=== Future members ===
- Northern Illinois Huskies (2026–present)

=== Former members ===
- Butler Bulldogs (1979–2012)
- Dayton Flyers (1987–1993)
- Duquesne Dukes (1992–1993)
- Evansville Purple Aces (1979–1994)
- La Salle Explorers (1992–1995)
- Loyola Ramblers (1979–2013)
- Marquette Warriors (1988–1991)
- Northern Illinois Huskies (1994–1997; returning in 2026)
- Notre Dame Fighting Irish (1982–1986, 1987–1995)
- Oklahoma City Chiefs (1979–1985) (Note: Oklahoma City did not adopt its current nickname of Stars until 1998.)
- Oral Roberts Golden Eagles (1979–1987)
- Saint Louis Billikens (1981–1991)
- UIC Flames (1994–2022)
- Valparaiso Crusaders (2007–2017) (Note: Valparaiso did not adopt its current nickname of Beacons until February 2021.)
- Xavier Musketeers (1979–1995)

=== Current associate members ===
==== Men's tennis ====
- Belmont Bruins (2022–present)
- Chicago State Cougars (2022–2025)
- Eastern Illinois Panthers (2022–present)
- Southern Indiana Screaming Eagles (2022–present)
- Tennessee State Tigers (2022–present)
- Tennessee Tech Golden Eagles (2022–present)

==== Women's tennis ====
- Chicago State Cougars (2022–2025)

=== Former associate members ===
==== Men's soccer ====
- Belmont Bruins (2014–2018)
- Chicago State Cougars (2022–2024)

==== Men's tennis ====
- Lindenwood Lions (2022–2024)

== Sports sponsored ==
=== Men's ===
School	Base	Bask	CC	Golf	Soccer	Swimming	Tennis	Indoor track	Outdoor track
Cleveland State	No	Yes	No	Yes	Yes	Yes	Yes	No	No
Detroit Mercy	No	Yes	Yes	Yes	Yes	No	Yes	Yes	Yes
Green Bay	No	Yes	Yes	Yes	Yes	Yes	Yes	No	No
IU Indy	No	Yes	Yes	Yes	Yes	Yes	Yes	Yes	Yes
Milwaukee	Yes	Yes	Yes	No	Yes	Yes	No	Yes	Yes
Northern Kentucky	Yes	Yes	Yes	Yes	Yes	Yes	Yes	Yes	Yes
Oakland	Yes	Yes	Yes	Yes	Yes	Yes	No	Yes	Yes
Purdue Fort Wayne	No	Yes	Yes	Yes	Yes	No	No	Yes	Yes
Robert Morris	No	Yes	No	Yes	Yes	No	No	No	No
Wright State	Yes	Yes	Yes	Yes	Yes	Yes	Yes	Yes	Yes
Youngstown State	Yes	Yes	Yes	Yes	No	No	Yes	Yes	Yes

=== Women's ===
School	Bask	CC	Golf	Soccer	Soft	Swimming	Tennis	Indoor track	Outdoor track	Volleyball
Cleveland State	Yes	Yes	Yes	Yes	Yes	Yes	Yes	Yes	Yes	Yes
Detroit Mercy	Yes	Yes	Yes	Yes	Yes	No	Yes	Yes	Yes	No
Green Bay	Yes	Yes	Yes	Yes	Yes	Yes	Yes	No	No	Yes
IU Indy	Yes	Yes	Yes	Yes	Yes	Yes	Yes	Yes	Yes	Yes
Milwaukee	Yes	Yes	No	Yes	No	Yes	Yes	Yes	Yes	Yes
Northern Kentucky	Yes	Yes	Yes	Yes	Yes	Yes	Yes	Yes	Yes	Yes
Oakland	Yes	Yes	Yes	Yes	Yes	Yes	Yes	Yes	Yes	Yes
Purdue Fort Wayne	Yes	Yes	Yes	Yes	No	No	No	Yes	Yes	Yes
Robert Morris	Yes	Yes	No	Yes	Yes	No	No	Yes	Yes	Yes
Wright State	Yes	Yes	No	Yes	Yes	Yes	Yes	Yes	Yes	Yes
Youngstown State	Yes	Yes	Yes	Yes	Yes	Yes	Yes	Yes	Yes	Yes

== Sports championship totals ==
This table includes all the championships earned by sport. A "–" denotes that the school never participated in the sport in the conference. These totals are through July 1, 2025.

=== Men's ===
School	Base	Bask	CC	Golf	Soccer	Swimming	Tennis	Indoor track	Outdoor track	Total
Cleveland State	0	3	–	10	2	4	9	–	–	28
Detroit Mercy	6	5	2	7	4	–	0	2	1	27
Green Bay	–	4	0	0	4	1	3	–	–	12
IU Indy	–	0	3	0	0	0	0	0	0	3
Milwaukee	7	8	0	–	11	4	0	16	16	62
Northern Kentucky	1	4	0	0	0	–	0	0	0	5
Oakland	1	1	3	1	4	12	–	0	1	23
Purdue Fort Wayne	0	0	0	1	0	-	-	0	0	1
Robert Morris	-	1	-	0	1	-	-	-	-	2
UIC	17	3	0	–	13	1	0	0	0	34
Wright State	17	3	0	9	2	8	1	0	0	40
Youngstown State	2	0	5	0	–	–	1	11	9	28
Belmont	–	–	–	–	0	–	2	–	–	2
Chicago State	–	–	–	–	–	–	0	–	–	0
Eastern Illinois	–	–	–	–	–	–	0	–	–	0
Lindenwood	–	–	–	–	–	–	0	–	–	0
Southern Indiana	–	–	–	–	–	–	0	–	–	0
Tennessee State	–	–	–	–	–	–	0	–	–	0
Tennessee Tech	–	–	–	–	–	–	0	–	–	0

=== Women's ===
School	Bask	CC	Golf	Soccer	Soft	Swimming	Tennis	Indoor track	Outdoor track	Volleyball	Total
Cleveland State	3	0	1	0	5	0	0	0	0	12	21
Detroit Mercy	3	2	3	3	7	–	0	4	2	–	24
Green Bay	38	0	1	0	3	9	1	–	–	2	54
IU Indy	2	0	2	2	0	0	0	0	0	0	6
Milwaukee	4	4	–	35	–	3	0	10	8	21	85
Northern Kentucky	0	0	0	1	1	–	0	0	0	1	3
Oakland	0	6	4	1	3	12	0	1	0	2	29
Purdue Fort Wayne	0	0	0	0	0	-	-	0	0	0	0
Robert Morris	0	1	-	0	1	-	-	0	0	0	2
UIC	0	0	0	–	24	0	19	0	0	1	44
Wright State	4	0	–	4	4	5	0	0	0	3	20
Youngstown State	0	2	4	0	1	0	8	13	16	0	44
Chicago State	0	0	0	0	0	0	1	0	0	0	1

== Titles per university ==
1. Milwaukee 147
2. Notre Dame 111
3. Butler 96
4. UIC 78
5. Youngstown State 72
6. Green Bay 66
7. Wright State 60
8. Oakland 52
9. Detroit Mercy 51
10. Loyola Chicago 50
11. Cleveland State 49
12. Evansville 31
13. Oral Roberts 31
14. Xavier 27
15. Valparaiso 20
16. Northern Illinois 10
17. IU Indy 9
18. Northern Kentucky 8
19. Oklahoma City 7
20. Dayton 4
21. Saint Louis 4
22. Robert Morris 4
23. La Salle 3
24. Marquette 3
25. Belmont 2
26. Purdue Fort Wayne 1
27. Chicago State 1
28. Duquesne 0

== Sports ==
=== All-sport champion ===
==== McCafferty Trophy ====
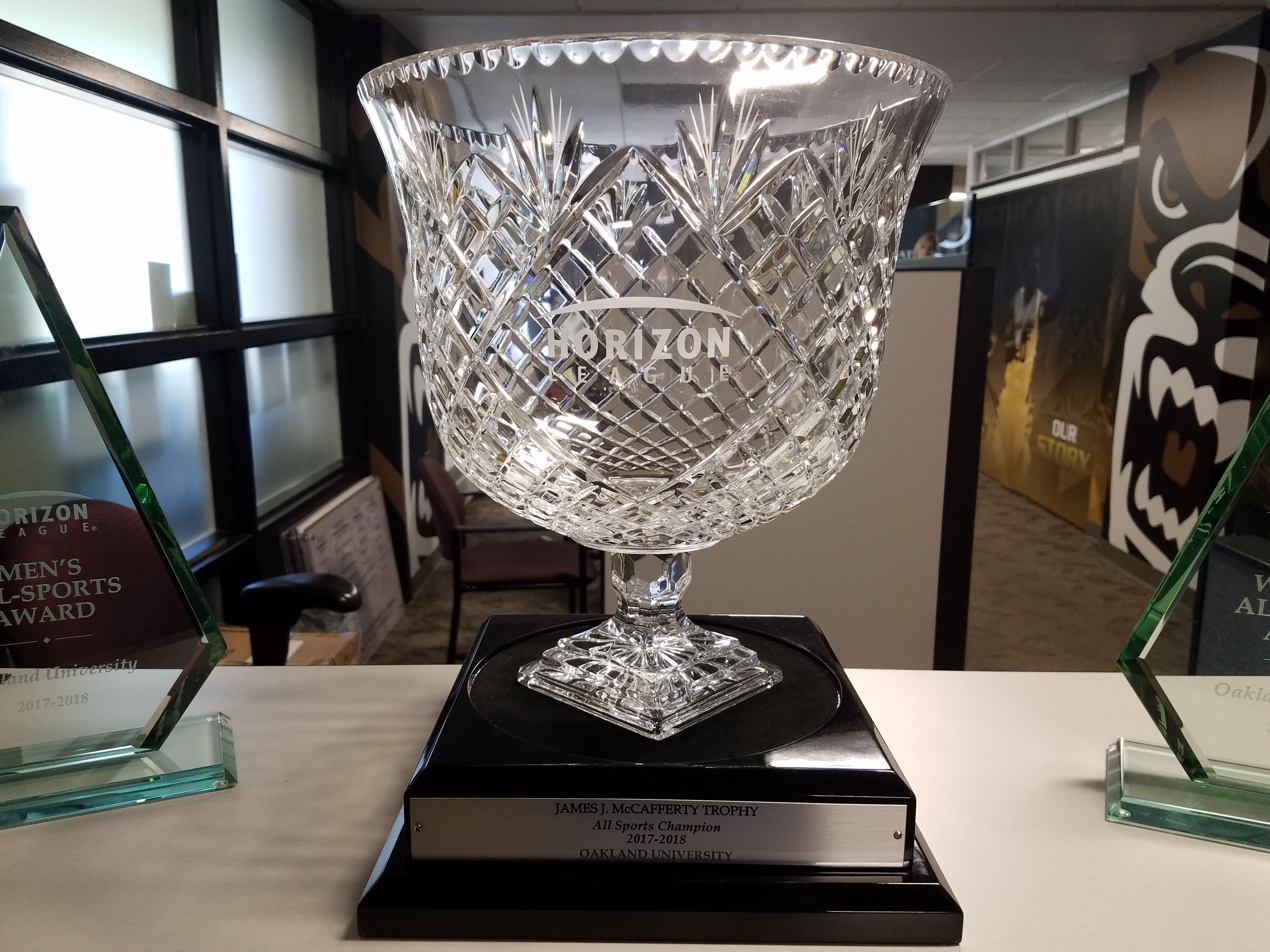
2017–18 version of the Horizon League's McCafferty trophy, awarded to Oakland University

The James J. McCafferty Trophy is awarded annually by the Horizon League to signify the leagues all-sport champion. Created in 1980, it was named for Jim McCafferty, who served as the first Commissioner of the Midwestern City Conference (now the Horizon League). Schools earn performance points based on their finish in all 19 championship sports the Horizon League offers. For the sports of baseball, softball, men's and women's soccer, women's volleyball, and men's and women's basketball, points are awarded based on combined regular season and championship finish. All other sports are based on finish in the League championship.

- Note, the McCafferty Trophy is not included in the championship totals. Also not all schools sponsor every sport that is calculated into the McCafferty points system.

Number of McCafferty Championships won by school

- Butler: 8
- Oakland: 8
- Milwaukee: 7
- Notre Dame: 7
- Oral Roberts: 7
- Cleveland State: 2
- UIC: 2
- Evansville: 2
- Youngstown State: 2
- Wright State: 1
- Northern Illinois: 1

Season	Champion	Points
1980	Oral Roberts	29.0
1981	Oral Roberts	36.0
1982	Oral Roberts	39.5
1983	Oral Roberts	43.5
1984	Oral Roberts	46.0
1985	Oral Roberts	55.0
1986	Oral Roberts	46.0
1987	Evansville	59.5
1988	Evansville	64.5
1989	Notre Dame	79.0
1990	Notre Dame	76.5
1991	Notre Dame	82.5
1992	Notre Dame	68.0
1993	Notre Dame	94.0
1994	Notre Dame	101.0
1995	Notre Dame	99.0
1996	Northern Illinois	57.0
1997	Butler	54.0
1998	Butler	59.0
1999	Butler	50.0
2000	UIC	38.0
2001	Milwaukee	53.0
2002	Butler	53.0
2003	Butler	47.5
2004	Milwaukee	48.0
2005	Milwaukee	49.0
2006	Milwaukee	53.0
2007	Butler/UIC	49.0
2008	Cleveland State	46.0
2009	Milwaukee	49.0
2010	Butler	51.5
2011	Butler	59.0
2012	Milwaukee	45.5
2013	Cleveland State	45.0
2014	Milwaukee	43.0
2015	Oakland	56.0
2016	Oakland	62.0
2017	Oakland	46.5
2018	Oakland	52.5
2019	Wright State	43
2020	Oakland	39
2021	Oakland	43
2022	Oakland	56.5
2023	Youngstown State	51
2024	Oakland	50
2025	Youngstown State	41

=== Men's ===
==== Baseball ====
Number of baseball titles by school

- UIC: 16 (11 regular season, 5 tournament)
- Oral Roberts: 12 (6 regular season, 6 tournament)
- Wright State: 11 (5 regular season, 6 tournament)
- Notre Dame: 11 (6 regular season, 5 tournament)
- Milwaukee: 7 (3 regular season, 4 tournament)
- Detroit: 6 (5 regular season, 1 tournament)
- Evansville: 6 (4 regular season, 2 tournament)
- Butler: 5 (3 regular season, 2 tournament)
- Xavier: 4 (4 regular season, 0 tournament)
- Valparaiso: 3 (1 regular season, 2 tournament)
- Oklahoma City: 2 (1 regular season, 1 tournament)
- Youngstown State: 2 (0 regular season, 2 tournament)
- Northern Illinois: 1 (0 regular season, 1 tournament)

Season	Regular season champion	Tournament champion
1981	North: Xavier, South: Oral Roberts	Oral Roberts
1982	North: Detroit, South: Oral Roberts	Oral Roberts
1983	North: Detroit, South: Oral Roberts	Oral Roberts
1984	North: Xavier, South: Oklahoma City	Oklahoma City
1985	North: Xavier, South: Oral Roberts	Oral Roberts
1986	North: Detroit, South: Oral Roberts	Oral Roberts
1987	North: Xavier, South: Oral Roberts	Oral Roberts
1988	North: Notre Dame, South: Evansville	Evansville
1989	North: Detroit, South: Evansville	Notre Dame
1990	North: Notre Dame South: Evansville	Evansville
1991	Evansville	Notre Dame
1992	Notre Dame	Notre Dame
1993	Notre Dame	Notre Dame
1994	Notre Dame	Notre Dame
1995	East: Detroit, West: Notre Dame	Wright State
1996	Butler	Northern Illinois
1997	Wright State	Detroit
1998	Butler	Butler
1999	Butler	Milwaukee
2000	Milwaukee	Butler
2001	Milwaukee	Milwaukee
2002	UIC	Milwaukee
2003	UIC	UIC
2004	UIC	Youngstown State
2005	UIC	UIC
2006	UIC	Wright State
2007	UIC	UIC
2008	UIC	UIC
2009	UIC	Wright State
2010	Wright State	Milwaukee
2011	UIC; Wright State	Wright State
2012	Valparaiso	Valparaiso
2013	Milwaukee	Valparaiso
2014	Wright State	Youngstown State
2015	UIC	Wright State
2016	Wright State	Wright State
2017	UIC	UIC

==== Men's basketball ====
Number of men's basketball titles by school

- Butler: 17 (10 regular season, 7 tournament)
- Xavier: 15 (8 regular season, 7 tournament)
- Milwaukee: 8 (4 regular season, 4 tournament)
- Evansville: 7 (5 regular season, 2 tournament)
- Valparaiso: 7 (5 regular season, 2 tournament)
- Detroit: 5 (2 regular season, 3 tournament)
- Loyola: 5 (3 regular season, 2 tournament)
- Green Bay: 4 (2 regular season, 2 tournament)
- UIC: 3 (1 regular season, 2 tournament)
- Oral Roberts: 3 (1 regular season, 2 tournament)
- Wright State: 3 (1 regular season, 2 tournament)
- Cleveland State: 2 (1 regular season, 1 tournament)
- Northern Kentucky: 2 (1 regular season, 1 tournament)
- Dayton: 1 (0 regular season, 1 tournament)
- Northern Illinois: 1 (0 regular season, 1 tournament)
- Oklahoma City: 1 (0 regular season, 1 tournament)
- Oakland: 1 (1 regular season, 0 tournament)

Season	Regular season champion	Tournament champion
1980	Loyola	Oral Roberts
1981	Xavier	Oklahoma City
1982	Evansville	Evansville
1983	Loyola	Xavier
1984	Oral Roberts	Oral Roberts
1985	Loyola	Loyola
1986	Xavier	Xavier
1987	Evansville; Loyola	Xavier
1988	Xavier	Xavier
1989	Evansville	Xavier
1990	Xavier	Dayton
1991	Xavier	Xavier
1992	Evansville	Evansville
1993	Evansville; Xavier	Xavier
1994	Xavier	Detroit
1995	Xavier	Green Bay
1996	Green Bay	Northern Illinois
1997	Butler	Butler
1998	Detroit; UIC	Butler
1999	Detroit	Detroit
2000	Butler	Butler
2001	Butler	Butler
2002	Butler	UIC
2003	Butler	Milwaukee
2004	Milwaukee	UIC
2005	Milwaukee	Milwaukee
2006	Milwaukee	Milwaukee
2007	Butler; Wright State	Wright State
2008	Butler	Butler
2009	Butler	Cleveland State
2010	Butler	Butler
2011	Butler; Cleveland State; Milwaukee	Butler
2012	Valparaiso	Detroit
2013	Valparaiso	Valparaiso
2014	Green Bay	Milwaukee
2015	Valparaiso	Valparaiso
2016	Valparaiso	Green Bay
2017	Oakland & Valparaiso	Northern Kentucky
2018	Northern Kentucky	Wright State

==== Men's cross country ====
Number of men's cross country titles by school

- Butler: 14
- Notre Dame: 10
- Loyola: 7
- Oral Roberts: 4
- Detroit: 2
- Oakland: 2
- Youngstown State: 2

Season	Tournament champion
1979	Oral Roberts
1980	Oral Roberts
1981	Oral Roberts
1982	Notre Dame
1983	Oral Roberts
1984	Notre Dame
1985	Notre Dame
1986	Loyola
1987	Loyola
1988	Notre Dame
1989	Notre Dame
1990	Notre Dame
1991	Notre Dame
1992	Notre Dame
1993	Notre Dame
1994	Notre Dame
1995	Loyola
1996	Loyola
1997	Loyola
1998	Butler
1999	Butler
2000	Butler
2001	Butler; Loyola
2002	Butler
2003	Butler
2004	Butler
2005	Butler
2006	Butler
2007	Butler
2008	Butler
2009	Butler
2010	Butler
2011	Butler
2012	Loyola
2013	Detroit
2014	Detroit
2015	Oakland
2016	Youngstown State
2017	Oakland
2018	Youngstown State

==== Men's golf ====
Number of men's golf titles by school

- Cleveland State: 9
- Detroit: 7
- Oral Roberts: 6
- Wright State: 5
- Xavier: 4
- Notre Dame: 3
- Valparaiso: 1
- Evansville: 1
- Loyola: 1
- Oklahoma City: 1

Season	Tournament champion
1980	Oral Roberts
1981	Oral Roberts
1982	Oral Roberts
1983	Oral Roberts
1984S	Oklahoma City
1984F	Oral Roberts
1985	Oral Roberts
1986	Evansville
1987	Detroit
1988	Notre Dame
1989	Notre Dame
1990	Xavier
1991	Xavier
1992	Xavier
1993	Xavier
1994	N/A
1995	Notre Dame
1996	Wright State
1997	Wright State
1998	Cleveland State
1999	Detroit
2000	Wright State
2001	Detroit
2002	Detroit
2003	Wright State
2004	Wright State
2005	Detroit
2006	Cleveland State
2007	Detroit
2008	Cleveland State
2009	Cleveland State
2010	Detroit
2011	Cleveland State
2012	Loyola
2013	Valparaiso
2014	Cleveland State
2015	Cleveland State
2016	Cleveland State
2017	Cleveland State

==== Men's soccer ====
Number of men's soccer titles by school

- Butler: 12 (7 regular season, 5 tournament)
- UIC: 11 (6 regular season, 5 tournament)
- Milwaukee: 10 (5 regular season, 5 tournament)
- Evansville: 8 (3 regular season, 5 tournament)
- Loyola: 5 (2 regular season, 3 tournament)
- Notre Dame: 5 (2 regular season, 3 tournament)
- Detroit: 4 (3 regular season, 1 tournament)
- Oakland: 3 (1 regular season, 2 tournament)
- Green Bay: 3 (2 regular season, 1 tournament)
- Xavier: 2 (2 regular season, 0 tournament)
- Saint Louis: 1 (1 regular season, 0 tournament)
- Valparaiso: 1 (1 regular season, 0 tournament)
- Wright State: 1 (1 regular season, 0 tournament)
- Cleveland State: 1 (0 regular season, 1 tournament)

Season	Regular season champion	Tournament champion
1987	N/A	Evansville
1988	N/A	Notre Dame
1989	North: Notre Dame, South: Evansville & Saint Louis	Evansville
1990	Evansville	Evansville
1991	Evansville	Evansville
1992	Xavier	Evansville
1993	Notre Dame	Notre Dame
1994	East: Xavier & Butler, West: Green Bay	Notre Dame
1995	Detroit	Butler
1996	Butler	Detroit
1997	Milwaukee	Butler
1998	Butler	Butler
1999	UIC	UIC
2000	UIC; Loyola	UIC
2001	Milwaukee	Butler
2002	Milwaukee	Milwaukee
2003	Milwaukee	Milwaukee
2004	Milwaukee; Butler	Milwaukee
2005	Detroit	Milwaukee
2006	UIC	Loyola
2007	Loyola	UIC
2008	UIC; Butler	Loyola
2009	Butler	Green Bay
2010	Butler	Butler
2011	Valparaiso	Loyola
2012	Detroit	Cleveland State
2013	UIC	Milwaukee
2014	Oakland	Oakland
2015	UIC	Oakland
2016	Wright State	UIC
2017	Green Bay	UIC

==== Men's swimming and diving ====
Number of men's swimming and diving titles by school

- Wright State: 8
- Notre Dame: 6
- Milwaukee: 4
- Cleveland State: 4
- Oakland: 4
- Evansville: 3
- La Salle: 3
- Green Bay: 1
- UIC: 1

Season	Tournament champion
1984	Evansville
1985	Notre Dame
1986	Evansville
1987	Evansville
1988	Notre Dame
1989	Notre Dame
1990	Notre Dame
1991	Notre Dame
1992	Notre Dame
1993	La Salle
1994	La Salle
1995	La Salle
1996	Wright State
1997	Wright State
1998	Cleveland State
1999	Cleveland State
2000	Milwaukee
2001	Wright State
2002	Green Bay
2003	Wright State
2004	Wright State
2005	Wright State
2006	Cleveland State
2007	Wright State
2008	Wright State
2009	UIC
2010	Milwaukee
2011	Milwaukee
2012	Milwaukee
2013	Cleveland State
2014	Oakland
2015	Oakland
2016	Oakland
2017	Oakland

==== Men's tennis ====
Number of men's tennis titles by school

- Butler: 9
- Notre Dame: 7
- Cleveland State: 5
- Oral Roberts: 4
- Green Bay: 3
- Oklahoma City: 3
- Valparaiso: 2
- Evansville: 2
- Northern Illinois: 2
- Wright State: 1

Season	Tournament champion
1980	Oral Roberts
1981	Oklahoma City
1982	Oklahoma City
1983	Oklahoma City
1984	Oral Roberts
1985	Oral Roberts
1986	Oral Roberts
1987	Evansville
1988	Evansville
1989	Notre Dame
1990	Notre Dame
1991	Notre Dame
1992	Notre Dame
1993	Notre Dame
1994	Notre Dame
1995	Notre Dame
1996	Northern Illinois
1997	Northern Illinois
1998	Butler
1999	Butler
2000	Butler
2001	Wright State
2002	Butler
2003	Butler
2004	Butler
2005	Butler
2006	Butler
2007	Butler
2008	Cleveland State
2009	Cleveland State
2010	Cleveland State
2011	Cleveland State
2012	Green Bay
2013	Cleveland State
2014	Green Bay
2015	Green Bay
2016	Valparaiso
2017	Valparaiso

==== Men's track and field ====
Number of men's track and field titles by school

- Milwaukee: 32 (16 indoor, 16 outdoor)
- Notre Dame: 11 (11 indoor, 0 outdoor)
- Youngstown State: 6 (3 indoor, 3 outdoor)
- Detroit: 3 (2 indoor, 1 outdoor)
- Oral Roberts: 2 (2 indoor, 0 outdoor)
- Loyola: 2 (2 indoor, 0 outdoor)
- Butler: 1 (1 indoor, 0 outdoor)

Season	Indoor champion	Outdoor champion
1980	Loyola	N/A
1981	Oral Roberts	N/A
1982	Oral Roberts	N/A
1983	Notre Dame	N/A
1984	Notre Dame	N/A
1985	Notre Dame	N/A
1986	Notre Dame	N/A
1987	N/A	N/A
1988	N/A	N/A
1989	Notre Dame	N/A
1990	Notre Dame	N/A
1991	Notre Dame	N/A
1992	Notre Dame	N/A
1993	Notre Dame	N/A
1994	Notre Dame	N/A
1995	Notre Dame	N/A
1996	Detroit	N/A
1997	Milwaukee	N/A
1998	Milwaukee	Milwaukee
1999	Milwaukee	Milwaukee
2000	Detroit & Milwaukee	Milwaukee
2001	Milwaukee	Milwaukee
2002	Butler	Milwaukee
2003	Youngstown State	Detroit
2004	Milwaukee	Milwaukee
2005	Milwaukee	Milwaukee
2006	Milwaukee	Milwaukee
2007	Milwaukee	Milwaukee
2008	Milwaukee	Milwaukee
2009	Milwaukee	Milwaukee
2010	Milwaukee	Milwaukee
2011	Milwaukee	Milwaukee
2012	Milwaukee	Milwaukee
2013	Loyola	Milwaukee
2014	Milwaukee	Youngstown State
2015	Milwaukee	Milwaukee
2016	Youngstown State	Youngstown State
2017	Youngstown State	Youngstown State

=== Women's ===
==== Women's basketball ====
Number of women's basketball titles by school

- Green Bay: 35 (20 regular season, 15 tournament)
- Notre Dame: 10 (5 regular season, 5 tournament)
- Milwaukee: 4 (2 regular season, 2 tournament)
- Butler: 3 (2 regular season, 1 tournament)
- Detroit: 3 (2 regular season, 1 tournament)
- Cleveland State: 2 (0 regular season, 2 tournament)
- Wright State: 2 (1 regular season, 1 tournament)
- Xavier: 2 (1 regular season, 1 tournament)
- Evansville: 1 (1 regular season, 0 tournament)
- Loyola: 1 (1 regular season, 0 tournament)
- Northern Illinois: 1 (0 regular season, 1 tournament)

Season	Regular season champion	Tournament champion
1987	Detroit	N/A
1988	Evansville	N/A
1989	Loyola & Notre Dame	Notre Dame
1990	Notre Dame	Notre Dame
1991	Notre Dame	Notre Dame
1992	Xavier	Notre Dame
1993	Butler	Xavier
1994	Notre Dame	Notre Dame
1995	Notre Dame	Northern Illinois
1996	Green Bay	Butler
1997	Detroit	Detroit
1998	Butler	Green Bay
1999	Green Bay	Green Bay
2000	Green Bay	Green Bay
2001	Green Bay & Milwaukee	Milwaukee
2002	Green Bay	Green Bay
2003	Green Bay	Green Bay
2004	Green Bay	Green Bay
2005	Green Bay	Green Bay
2006	Milwaukee & Green Bay	Milwaukee
2007	Green Bay	Green Bay
2008	Green Bay	Cleveland State
2009	Green Bay	Green Bay
2010	Green Bay	Cleveland State
2011	Green Bay	Green Bay
2012	Green Bay	Green Bay
2013	Green Bay	Green Bay
2014	Green Bay	Wright State
2015	Green Bay	Green Bay
2016	Green Bay	Green Bay
2017	Green Bay & Wright State	Green Bay

==== Women's cross country ====
Number of women's cross country titles by school

- Butler: 13
- Loyola: 6
- Notre Dame: 4
- Oakland: 3
- Youngstown State: 2
- Detroit: 2
- Dayton: 2
- Milwaukee: 1

Season	Tournament champion
1986	Detroit
1987	Detroit
1988	Dayton
1989	Dayton
1990	Notre Dame
1991	Loyola
1992	Notre Dame
1993	Notre Dame
1994	Notre Dame
1995	Loyola
1996	Butler
1997	Butler
1998	Butler
1999	Butler
2000	Loyola
2001	Loyola
2002	Butler
2003	Butler
2004	Butler
2005	Butler
2006	Butler
2007	Butler
2008	Loyola
2009	Butler
2010	Butler
2011	Butler
2012	Loyola
2013	Youngstown State
2014	Youngstown State
2015	Oakland
2016	Oakland
2017	Oakland
2018	Milwaukee

==== Women's golf ====
Number of women's golf titles by school

- Butler: 6
- Detroit: 3
- Youngstown State: 3
- Cleveland State: 1
- Oakland: 1
- Loyola: 1

Season	Tournament champion
2003	Youngstown State
2004	Loyola
2005	Butler
2006	Butler
2007	Butler
2008	Butler
2009	Youngstown State
2010	Detroit
2011	Butler
2012	Butler
2013	Detroit
2014	Detroit
2015	Youngstown State
2016	Oakland
2017	Cleveland State

==== Women's soccer ====
Number of women's soccer titles by school

- Milwaukee: 28 (18 regular season, 10 tournament)
- Notre Dame: 6 (4 regular season, 2 tournament)
- Butler: 5 (4 regular season, 1 tournament)
- Loyola: 5 (2 regular season, 3 tournament)
- Wright State: 4 (1 regular season, 3 tournament)
- Detroit: 3 (1 regular season, 2 tournament)
- Valparaiso: 2 (1 regular season, 1 tournament)
- Oakland: 1 (0 regular season, 1 tournament)
- IU Indy: 1 (0 regular season, 1 tournament as IUPUI)
- Northern Kentucky: 1 (0 regular season, 1 tournament)

Season	Regular season champion	Tournament champion
1991	Notre Dame	N/A
1992	Notre Dame	N/A
1993	Notre Dame	Notre Dame
1994	Notre Dame	Notre Dame
1995	Butler	Detroit
1996	Butler & Detroit	Butler
1997	Milwaukee	Milwaukee
1998	Loyola	Wright State
1999	Wright State & Butler	Wright State
2000	Milwaukee	Wright State
2001	Milwaukee	Milwaukee
2002	Milwaukee	Milwaukee
2003	Milwaukee	Loyola
2004	Milwaukee	Detroit
2005	Milwaukee	Milwaukee
2006	Milwaukee	Loyola
2007	Milwaukee	Loyola
2008	Milwaukee & Loyola	Milwaukee
2009	Milwaukee	Milwaukee
2010	Milwaukee & Butler	Milwaukee
2011	Milwaukee	Milwaukee
2012	Milwaukee	Milwaukee
2013	Milwaukee	Milwaukee
2014	Valparaiso	Valparaiso
2015	Milwaukee	Oakland
2016	Milwaukee	Northern Kentucky
2017	Milwaukee	IUPUI

==== Softball ====
Number of softball titles by school

- UIC: 22 (14 regular season, 8 tournament)
- Notre Dame: 10 (5 regular season, 5 tournament)
- Detroit: 6 (2 regular season, 4 tournament)
- Loyola: 6 (6 regular season, 0 tournament)
- Cleveland State: 4 (2 regular season, 2 tournament)
- Wright State: 4 (0 regular season, 4 tournament)
- Valparaiso: 4 (1 regular season, 3 tournament)
- Northern Illinois: 2 (1 regular season, 1 tournament)
- Green Bay: 3 (1 regular season, 2 tournament)
- Oakland: 2 (1 regular season, 1 tournament)
- Youngstown State: 1 (0 regular season, 1 tournament)

Season	Regular season champion	Tournament champion
1987	N/A	Detroit
1988	N/A	Detroit
1989	N/A	Detroit
1990	Notre Dame	Notre Dame
1991	Detroit	Notre Dame
1992	Detroit & Notre Dame	Detroit
1993	Notre Dame	Notre Dame
1994	Notre Dame	Notre Dame
1995	Notre Dame	Notre Dame
1996	UIC & Northern Illinois	Northern Illinois
1997	UIC	Cleveland State
1998	UIC	UIC
1999	UIC	UIC
2000	UIC	UIC
2001	Loyola	UIC
2002	UIC & Loyola	UIC
2003	Loyola	Wright State
2004	UIC	UIC
2005	UIC	Green Bay
2006	UIC	Youngstown State
2007	Loyola	Wright State
2008	Cleveland State	Wright State
2009	UIC	Cleveland State
2010	Cleveland State	Wright State
2011	Loyola	UIC
2012	Valparaiso	Valparaiso
2013	UIC & Loyola	Valparaiso
2014	Green Bay	Green Bay
2015	Oakland & UIC	Oakland
2016	UIC	Valparaiso
2017	UIC	UIC

==== Women's swimming and diving ====
Number of women's swimming and diving titles by school

- Green Bay: 9
- Notre Dame: 9
- Wright State: 5
- Oakland: 4
- Milwaukee: 3
- Evansville: 1

Season	Tournament champion
1987	Evansville
1988	Notre Dame
1989	Notre Dame
1990	Notre Dame
1991	Notre Dame
1992	Notre Dame
1993	Notre Dame
1994	Notre Dame
1995	Notre Dame
1996	Notre Dame
1997	Wright State
1998	Green Bay
1999	Wright State
2000	Green Bay
2001	Milwaukee
2002	Wright State
2003	Wright State
2004	Wright State
2005	Green Bay
2006	Green Bay
2007	Green Bay
2008	Green Bay
2009	Green Bay
2010	Green Bay
2011	Green Bay
2012	Milwaukee
2013	Milwaukee
2014	Oakland
2015	Oakland
2016	Oakland
2017	Oakland

==== Women's tennis ====
Number of women's tennis titles by school

- UIC: 17
- Notre Dame: 7
- Youngstown State: 4
- Evansville: 2
- Green Bay: 1

Season	Tournament champion
1986	Evansville
1987	Evansville
1988	Notre Dame
1989	Notre Dame
1990	Notre Dame
1991	Notre Dame
1992	Notre Dame
1993	Notre Dame
1994	Notre Dame
1995	N/A
1996	Green Bay
1997	UIC
1998	UIC
1999	UIC
2000	UIC
2001	UIC
2002	UIC
2003	UIC
2004	UIC
2005	UIC
2006	UIC
2007	UIC
2008	UIC
2009	UIC
2010	UIC
2011	UIC
2012	UIC
2013	UIC
2014	Youngstown State
2015	Youngstown State
2016	Youngstown State
2017	Youngstown State

==== Women's track and field ====
Number of women's track and field titles by school

- Milwaukee: 16 (9 indoor, 7 outdoor)
- Youngstown State: 16 (6 indoor, 10 outdoor)
- Detroit: 6 (4 indoor, 2 outdoor)
- Notre Dame: 4 (4 indoor, 0 outdoor)
- Marquette: 3 (3 indoor, 0 outdoor)
- Loyola: 2 (1 indoor, 1 outdoor)
- Oakland: 1 (1 indoor, 0 outdoor)
- Butler: 1 (1 indoor, 0 outdoor)

Season	Indoor champion	Outdoor champion
1989	Marquette	N/A
1990	Marquette	N/A
1991	Marquette	N/A
1992	Notre Dame	N/A
1993	Notre Dame	N/A
1994	Notre Dame	N/A
1995	Notre Dame	N/A
1996	Detroit	N/A
1997	Butler	N/A
1998	Detroit	Milwaukee
1999	Detroit	Detroit
2000	Milwaukee	Detroit
2001	Milwaukee	Milwaukee
2002	Detroit	Milwaukee
2003	Milwaukee	Milwaukee
2004	Youngstown State	Youngstown State
2005	Youngstown State	Youngstown State
2006	Milwaukee	Youngstown State
2007	Milwaukee	Milwaukee
2008	Youngstown State	Youngstown State
2009	Milwaukee	Youngstown State
2010	Milwaukee	Milwaukee
2011	Milwaukee	Milwaukee
2012	Milwaukee	Youngstown State
2013	Loyola	Loyola
2014	Youngstown State	Youngstown State
2015	Youngstown State	Youngstown State
2016	Oakland	Youngstown State
2017	Youngstown State	Youngstown State

==== Women's volleyball ====
Number of women's volleyball titles by school

- Milwaukee: 21 (13 regular season, 8 tournament)
- Cleveland State: 10 (5 regular season, 5 tournament)
- Butler: 10 (6 regular season, 4 tournament)
- Loyola: 9 (4 regular season, 5 tournament).
- Notre Dame: 8 (4 regular season, 4 tournament)
- Northern Illinois: 3 (2 regular season, 1 tournament)
- Saint Louis: 3 (1 regular season, 2 tournament)
- Oakland: 2 (1 regular season, 1 tournament)
- Dayton: 1 (0 regular season, 1 tournament)
- Green Bay: 1 (0 regular season, 1 tournament)

Season	Regular season champion	Tournament champion
1986	Butler	Butler
1987	Butler, Loyola & Saint Louis	Butler
1988	Butler	Saint Louis
1989	Butler	Saint Louis
1990	Butler	Dayton
1991	Notre Dame	Notre Dame
1992	Notre Dame	Notre Dame
1993	Notre Dame	Notre Dame
1994	Notre Dame	Notre Dame
1995	Northern Illinois	Loyola
1996	Northern Illinois	Northern Illinois
1997	Butler & Milwaukee	Butler
1998	Milwaukee	Milwaukee
1999	Milwaukee	Loyola
2000	Loyola & Milwaukee	Loyola
2001	Loyola	Milwaukee
2002	Loyola	Milwaukee
2003	Milwaukee	Green Bay
2004	Milwaukee	Loyola
2005	Milwaukee	Loyola
2006	Milwaukee	Milwaukee
2007	Milwaukee	Cleveland State
2008	Milwaukee	Milwaukee
2009	Cleveland State	Milwaukee
2010	Milwaukee	Butler
2011	Milwaukee	Milwaukee
2012	Cleveland State	Cleveland State
2013	Milwaukee	Milwaukee
2014	Oakland	Oakland
2015	Cleveland State	Cleveland State
2016	Cleveland State	Cleveland State
2017	Cleveland State	Cleveland State

== Sources ==
- http://horizonleague.org
- https://web.archive.org/web/20081223215844/http://horizonleague.cstv.com/ot/hori-awards.html
- https://web.archive.org/web/20131222221129/http://www.horizonleague.org/championships.html
- http://grfx.cstv.com/photos/schools/hori/sports/m-basebl/auto_pdf/ASRB-Baseball.pdf
- http://grfx.cstv.com/photos/schools/hori/sports/m-baskbl/auto_pdf/Records-MBB.pdf
- http://grfx.cstv.com/photos/schools/hori/sports/m-soccer/auto_pdf/Records-MSOC.pdf
- http://grfx.cstv.com/photos/schools/hori/sports/w-baskbl/auto_pdf/Records-WBB.pdf
- http://grfx.cstv.com/photos/schools/hori/sports/w-softbl/auto_pdf/ASRB-Softball.pdf
- http://grfx.cstv.com/photos/schools/hori/sports/w-soccer/auto_pdf/Records-WSOC.pdf
- http://grfx.cstv.com/photos/schools/hori/sports/w-volley/auto_pdf/Records-VB.pdf
- http://grfx.cstv.com/photos/schools/hori/sports/c-swim/auto_pdf/Records-SWM.pdf
- http://grfx.cstv.com/photos/schools/hori/sports/c-xc/auto_pdf/Records-XC.pdf
- http://grfx.cstv.com/photos/schools/hori/sports/c-tennis/auto_pdf/ASRB-Tennis.pdf
- http://grfx.cstv.com/photos/schools/hori/sports/c-golf/auto_pdf/ASRB-Golf.pdf
- http://grfx.cstv.com/photos/schools/hori/sports/c-track/auto_pdf/ASRB-OutdoorTrack.pdf
- http://grfx.cstv.com/photos/schools/hori/sports/c-track/auto_pdf/Records-ITF.pdf
