= 1994 MAAC men's basketball tournament =

- Classification: Division I
- Season: 1993–94
- Teams: 8
- Site: Knickerbocker Arena; Albany, New York
- Champions: Loyola (MD) (1st title)
- Winning coach: Skip Prosser (1st title)
- MVP: Tracy Bergan (Loyola (MD))

1993–94 MAAC men's basketball standings
| | Conf. | | | | Overall |
| Team | W | | L | PCT | W | | L | PCT |
|---|---|---|---|---|---|---|---|---|
| Canisius | 12 | – | 2 | .857 | 22 | – | 7 | .759 |
| Manhattan | 10 | – | 4 | .714 | 19 | – | 11 | .633 |
| Siena | 10 | – | 4 | .714 | 25 | – | 8 | .758 |
| Saint Peter's | 8 | – | 6 | .571 | 14 | – | 13 | .519 |
| Loyola (MD) † | 6 | – | 8 | .429 | 17 | – | 13 | .567 |
| Fairfield | 4 | – | 10 | .286 | 8 | – | 19 | .296 |
| Iona | 3 | – | 11 | .214 | 7 | – | 20 | .259 |
| Niagara | 3 | – | 11 | .214 | 6 | – | 21 | .222 |
† 1994 MAAC tournament winner Rankings from AP Poll

The 1994 MAAC men's basketball tournament was held March 5–7, 1994 at Knickerbocker Arena in Albany, New York.

Fifth-seeded Loyola (MD) defeated Manhattan in the championship game, 80–75, to win their first MAAC men's basketball tournament.

The Greyhounds received an automatic bid to the 1994 NCAA tournament.

== Format ==
All eight of the conference's members participated in the tournament field. They were seeded based on regular season conference records.

== Bracket ==
Quarterfinals; Saturday, March 5
1 | Canisius | 59
8 | Niagara | 45
4 | Saint Peter's | 80^{OT}
5 | Loyola (MD) | 87
3 | Siena | 84
6 | Fairfield | 73
2 | Manhattan | 99
7 | Iona | 65

Semifinals; Sunday, March 6
1 | Canisius | 70
5 | Loyola (MD) | 88
3 | Siena | 65
2 | Manhattan | 68

Championship; Monday, March 7
5 | Loyola (MD) | 80
2 | Manhattan | 75
