= Jim Lacy =

American basketball player (1926–2014)

Personal information
- Born: April 1926 Baltimore, Maryland, U.S.
- Died: February 15, 2014 (aged 87) Baltimore, Maryland, U.S.
- Listed height: 6 ft 2 in (1.88 m)
- Listed weight: 185 lb (84 kg)

Career information
- High school: Loyola (Towson, Maryland)
- College: Loyola (Maryland) (1943–1944, 1946–1949)
- NBA draft: 1949: ?? round, ??
- Drafted by: Washington Capitols
- Position: Forward
- Number: 16

Career highlights
- NCAA scoring champion (1947)
- Stats at Basketball Reference

James Joseph Lacy Jr. (April 1926 – February 15, 2014) was an American basketball player for Loyola College of Maryland in 1943–44 and then 1946–47 to 1948–49. He was regarded as one of the top college basketball scorers of his era.

== College career ==
As a freshman for the Loyola Greyhounds in 1943–44, Lacy was the state's leading scorer. He turned 18 after the season and subsequently enlisted in the United States Navy due to World War II. He later returned to Loyola and led the nation in scoring in 1946–47 at 20.8 points per game. On February 3, 1947, he had perhaps the most memorable game of his career against the #1 team in the east, Seton Hall, when he scored 20 points to lead Loyola to a 54–53 upset.

In his junior year, Lacy finished second in the national scoring race. He scored 44 points in a game against Western Maryland to set a school record that still stands. He was team captain during his senior year. From 1946 to 1949, he led the Greyhounds to three Mason-Dixon Conference championships and its first NAIA tournament win. He was the first player in NCAA history to score 2,000 career points, finishing at 2,154. Despite playing before the introduction of the three-point shot, he is still Loyola's all-time leader in points scored. He also holds the school records for career field goals (796) and career free throws made (613). During his four years in college, he shot 79.8% from the free throw line.

== Later life ==
Lacy was inducted into the Loyola College Hall of Fame. After college, he was drafted by the Washington Capitols of the Basketball Association of America. However, professional basketball did not interest him, and he never played in the NBA.

He stood at 6'2" and weighed 185 lbs. He later became the fire commissioner in Baltimore, Maryland.

== Death ==
Lacy died of melanoma on February 15, 2014, at the age of 87. He was survived by four children. Dorothy, his wife of 57 years, died in 2006; a daughter died in 2009.
