= 1958 National Invitation Tournament =

US university basketball tournament

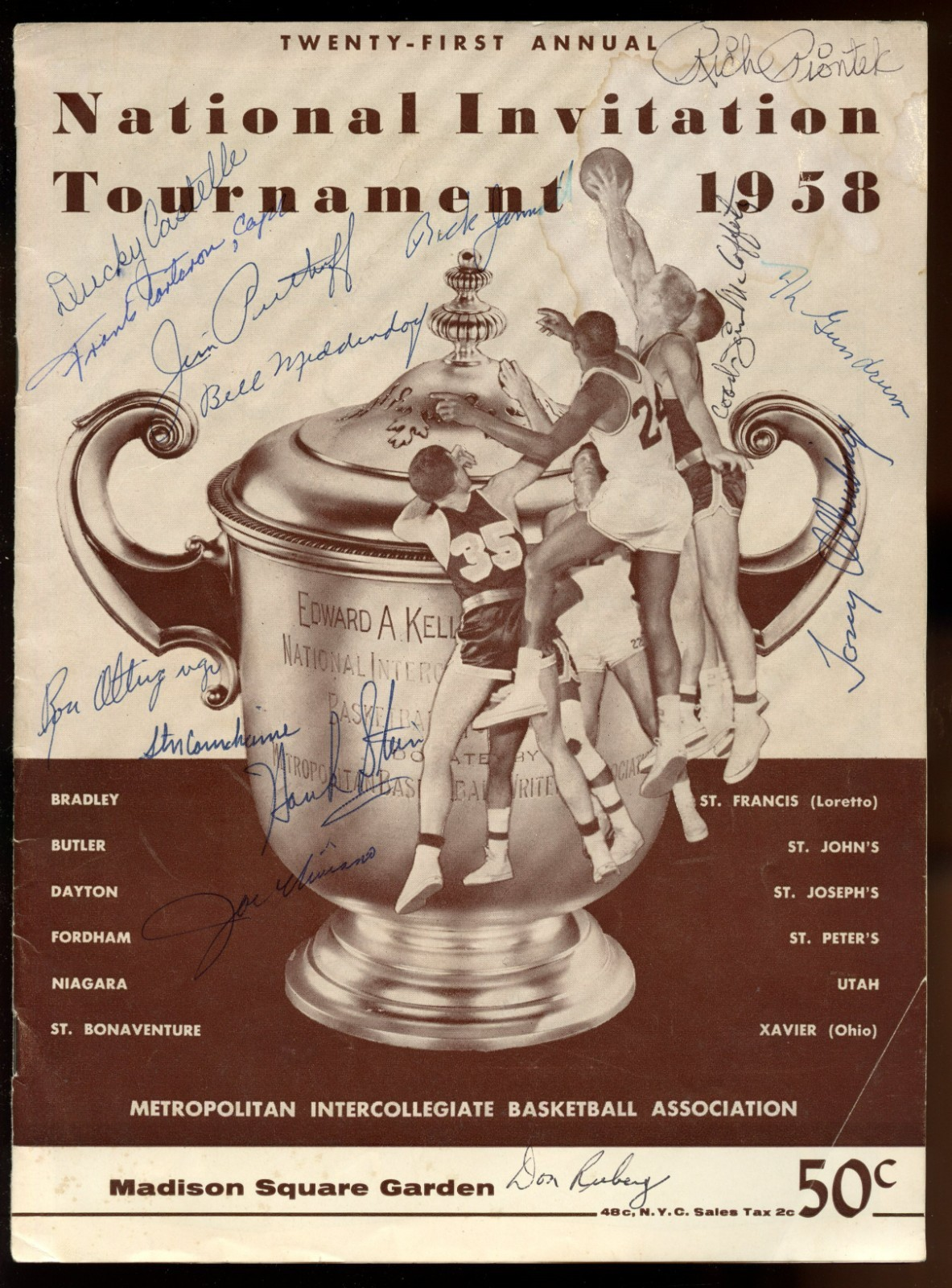
- Season: 1957–58
- Teams: 12
- Finals site: Madison Square Garden, New York City
- Champions: Xavier Musketeers (1st title)
- Runner-up: Dayton Flyers (5th title game)
- Semifinalists: St. Bonaventure Bonnies (3rd semifinal); St. John's Red Storm (8th semifinal)
- Winning coach: Jim McCafferty (1st title)
- MVP: Hank Stein (Xavier)

The 1958 National Invitation Tournament was the 1958 edition of the annual NCAA college basketball competition.

== Selected teams ==
Below is a list of the 12 teams selected for the tournament.

- Bradley
- Butler
- Dayton
- Fordham
- Niagara
- Saint Francis (PA)
- Saint Joseph's
- Saint Peter's
- St. Bonaventure
- St. John's
- Utah
- Xavier

== Bracket ==
Below is the tournament bracket.

First round
St. John's	76
Butler	69
Fordham	83
Saint Francis (PA)	59
Saint Joseph's	83
Saint Peter's	76
Xavier	95
Niagara	86

Quarterfinals
St. John's	71
Utah	70
Dayton	74
Fordham	70
Saint Joseph's	75
St. Bonaventure	79
Bradley	62
Xavier	72

Semifinals
St. John's	56
Dayton	80
St. Bonaventure	53
Xavier	72

Finals
Dayton	74
Xavier	78

Third place game
St. John's	69
St. Bonaventure	84

== See also ==
- 1958 NCAA University Division basketball tournament
- 1958 NCAA College Division basketball tournament
- 1958 NAIA Division I men's basketball tournament
