= Andrew Kostecka III =

American basketball player (born 1997)

Oviedo CB
- Position: Shooting guard
- League: LEB Oro

Personal information
- Born: August 19, 1997 (age 29)
- Listed height: 6 ft 4 in (1.93 m)
- Listed weight: 189 lb (86 kg)

Career information
- High school: Clarksburg (Clarksburg, Maryland)
- College: Loyola (Maryland) (2016–2020)
- NBA draft: 2020: undrafted
- Playing career: 2021–present

Career history
- 2021–present: Oviedo CB

Career highlights
- 2x First-team All-Patriot League (2019, 2020); 3x Patriot League All-Defensive Team (2018–2020)

Andrew Edward Kostecka III (born August 19, 1997) is an American professional basketball player for Oviedo CB of the Spanish LEB Oro. He played college basketball for Loyola (Maryland).

== High school career ==
Kostecka grew up in Germantown, Maryland and played soccer in addition to basketball. He attended Clarksburg High School, where he was coached by GJ Kissal. As a sophomore, he led Clarksburg to its first Class 4A West regional finals before losing to Walt Whitman High School. Kostecka suffered a quad contusion as a junior, forcing him to miss more than half the season. He led the team to the Class 4A West regional finals as a senior, where they again lost to Walt Whitman. He averaged 19.6 points, 6.3 rebounds and 2.5 assists per game as a senior. Kostecka played AAU basketball for DC Assault initially, starting on the B team before becoming a key player. After DC Assault was disbanded, he joined Team Takeover. Kostecka committed to Holy Cross after impressing the coaches during a scrimmage, but switched his commitment to Loyola (Maryland).

== College career ==
Kostecka averaged 7.1 points, 2.1 rebounds, and 1.1 assists per game as a freshman. As a sophomore, he averaged 11 points, 3.7 rebounds, and 1.8 assists per game, earning Patriot League All-Defensive Team honors. Coming into his junior season, Kostecka was expected to help fill the scoring void left by the graduated Andre Walker and Cam Gregory. He averaged 21.3 points, 4.8 rebounds and 2.4 assists per game as a junior, shooting 52.3 percent from the field. Kostecka was named to the First Team All-Patriot League. On January 2, 2020, he scored a career-high 37 points, becoming the 10th player in school history to reach 1,500 career points in an 80–70 win against Holy Cross. He missed a game against Lafayette on January 11 with a sprained ankle. As a senior, Kostecka averaged 19.9 points, 5.2 rebounds, 2.5 assists, and 1.9 steals per game. He was named to the First Team All-Patriot League and became the second player in conference history (after Bucknell's Stephen Brown) to be named to the All-Defensive Team three times.

== Professional career ==
On November 15, 2020, Kostecka signed his first professional contract with Hapoel Afula of the Israeli National League. On July 21, 2021, he signed with Oviedo CB of the LEB Oro. After losing his rookie season to COVID-19, the 2021–2022 season with Oviedo will be his first year playing professionally.

== Personal life ==
Kostecka is the son of Lana and Andy Kostecka Jr., both of whom were high school athletes. His older sister Laurie played high school basketball and played softball at the University of Tampa. Kostecka's grandfather Andy Kostecka played college basketball at Georgetown and professionally in the Basketball Association of America. Kostecka also plays golf, and began playing piano after his grandfather taught him at a young age. He is a fan of the Maryland Terrapins, particularly Greivis Vásquez, whom he met at the age of 14.
