= 1993–94 Loyola Greyhounds men's basketball team =

American college basketball season

1993–94 Loyola Greyhounds men's basketball

MAAC tournament champions

NCAA Tournament, First round
- Conference: Metro Atlantic Athletic Conference
- Record: 17–13 (6–8 MAAC)
- Head coach: Skip Prosser (1st season)
- Home arena: Reitz Arena

1993–94 MAAC men's basketball standings
| | Conf. | | | | Overall |
| Team | W | | L | PCT | W | | L | PCT |
|---|---|---|---|---|---|---|---|---|
| Canisius | 12 | – | 2 | .857 | 22 | – | 7 | .759 |
| Manhattan | 10 | – | 4 | .714 | 19 | – | 11 | .633 |
| Siena | 10 | – | 4 | .714 | 25 | – | 8 | .758 |
| Saint Peter's | 8 | – | 6 | .571 | 14 | – | 13 | .519 |
| Loyola (MD) † | 6 | – | 8 | .429 | 17 | – | 13 | .567 |
| Fairfield | 4 | – | 10 | .286 | 8 | – | 19 | .296 |
| Iona | 3 | – | 11 | .214 | 7 | – | 20 | .259 |
| Niagara | 3 | – | 11 | .214 | 6 | – | 21 | .222 |
† 1994 MAAC tournament winner Rankings from AP Poll

The 1993–94 Loyola Greyhounds men's basketball team represented Loyola University Maryland during the 1993–94 NCAA Division I men's basketball season. The Greyhounds, led by head coach Skip Prosser, played their home games at Reitz Arena and are members of the Metro Atlantic Athletic Conference. They finished the season 17–13, 6–8 in MAAC play to finish in fifth place. The Greyhounds made an unexpected run to capture the MAAC Basketball tournament and earned the conference's automatic bid into the 1994 NCAA tournament – the first appearance in program history. Playing as the No. 15 seed in the West region, Loyola lost in the first round to No. 2 seed and eventual Final Four participant Arizona, 81–55.

Senior guard Tracy Bergan established school records for career assists and steals. While the steals record has been surpassed, Bergan's assist mark remains. In 2008, Bergan was named to Loyola's All-Century Team.

== Roster ==
1993–94 Loyola Greyhounds men's basketball team
Players
Coaches

| Pos. | # | Name | Height | Weight | Year | Hometown |
|---|---|---|---|---|---|---|
| G | 3 | Milt Williams | 5 ft 11 in (1.8 m) | — | Fr | Greensboro, North Carolina |
| F | 4 | Matt Walker | 6 ft 2 in (1.88 m) | — | So | Lewisberry, Pennsylvania |
| G | 10 | Matt Gabriel | 6 ft 1 in (1.85 m) | — | Jr | Hazleton, Pennsylvania |
| G | 11 | Tracy Bergan | 6 ft 1 in (1.85 m) | — | Sr | New Carrollton, Maryland |
| G | 12 | Sam Steen | 5 ft 8 in (1.73 m) | — | Fr |
| G | 15 | Teron Owens | 6 ft 3 in (1.91 m) | — | So | Catonsville, Maryland |
| G | 22 | Darius Johnson | 6 ft 3 in (1.91 m) | 180 lb (82 kg) | Fr | Cincinnati, Ohio |
| F | 25 | David Credle | 6 ft 7 in (2.01 m) | — | Jr | Washington, D. C. |
| F | 31 | Julian Tate | 6 ft 6 in (1.98 m) | — | Fr | Monmouth Junction, New Jersey |
| F | 32 | Michael Reese | 6 ft 8 in (2.03 m) | — | Sr |
| F | 33 | B. J. Pendleton | 6 ft 6 in (1.98 m) | 225 lb (102 kg) | Jr | Washington, D. C. |
| G | 42 | Matt McGovern | 6 ft 1 in (1.85 m) | — | Jr |
| F | 44 | Mark Sparzak | 6 ft 8 in (2.03 m) | — | Sr |
| C | 45 | Ricky Wohl | 6 ft 11 in (2.11 m) | — | Jr | Petange, Luxembourg |
| C | 50 | Virgil Wallace | 6 ft 10 in (2.08 m) | — | Jr | Troy, New York |

Head coach

- Skip Prosser

Assistant coach(es)

Legend

- (C) Team captain
- (S) Suspended
- (I) Ineligible
- (W) Walk-on
- Injured
- Current redshirt

Roster

== Schedule and results ==
| Date time, TV | Rank^{#} | Opponent^{#} | Result | Record | Site (attendance) city, state |
Regular season
| Nov 29, 1993* | | at William & Mary | W 97–84 | 1–0 | William & Mary Hall (1,629); Williamsburg, Virginia |
| Dec 1, 1993* | | Towson | W 90–84 ^{OT} | 2–0 | Reitz Arena; Baltimore, Maryland |
| Dec 4, 1993* | | Saint Joseph's | L 70–90 | 2–1 | Reitz Arena; Baltimore, Maryland |
| Dec 8, 1993* | | at American | L 96–112 | 2–2 | Bender Arena (1,365); Washington, D.C. |
| Dec 11, 1993* | | at Mount St. Mary's | W 85–79 | 3–2 | Knott Arena (2,950); Emmitsburg, Maryland |
| Jan 3, 1994* | | at Delaware | L 65–77 | 3–3 | Bob Carpenter Center (2,751); Newark, Delaware |
| Jan 5, 1994 | | Iona | W 89–84 | 4–3 (1–0) | Reitz Arena; Baltimore, Maryland |
| Jan 8, 1994 | | Maine | W 83–71 | 5–3 | Reitz Arena; Baltimore, Maryland |
| Jan 10, 1994* | | Navy | W 78–68 | 6–3 | Reitz Arena; Baltimore, Maryland |
| Jan 12, 1994* | | UMBC | W 69–57 | 7–3 | Reitz Arena; Baltimore, Maryland |
| Jan 15, 1994 | | Siena | L 72–77 | 7–4 (1–1) | Reitz Arena; Baltimore, Maryland |
| Jan 17, 1994 | | at Saint Peter's | W 70–63 | 8–4 (2–1) | Yanitelli Center; Jersey City, New Jersey |
| Jan 22, 1994 | | at Canisius | L 72–87 | 8–5 (2–2) | Buffalo Memorial Auditorium (1,048); Buffalo, New York |
| Jan 24, 1994 | | Niagara | W 76–61 | 9–5 (3–2) | Reitz Arena (917); Baltimore, Maryland |
| Jan 27, 1994 | | at Fairfield | L 67–85 | 9–6 (3–3) | Alumni Hall; Fairfield, Connecticut |
| Jan 30, 1994* | | William & Mary | W 94–81 | 10–6 | Reitz Arena; Baltimore, Maryland |
| Feb 2, 1994 | | Saint Peter's | L 87–90 ^{OT} | 10–7 (3–4) | Reitz Arena; Baltimore, Maryland |
| Feb 5, 1994 | | Niagara | W 70–62 | 11–7 (4–4) | Reitz Arena; Baltimore, Maryland |
| Feb 7, 1994 | | Canisius | L 76–78 | 11–8 (4–5) | Reitz Arena; Baltimore, Maryland |
| Feb 9, 1994 | | at Siena | L 78–88 | 11–9 (4–6) | UHY Center (2,405); Loudonville, New York |
| Feb 13, 1994 | | at Manhattan | L 80–95 | 11–10 (4–7) | Draddy Gymnasium (781); New York, New York |
| Feb 14, 1994 | | at Iona | W 88–64 | 12–10 (5–7) | Hynes Athletic Center (1,004); New Rochelle, New York |
| Feb 19, 1994* | | at Maryland | L 71–94 | 12–11 | Cole Fieldhouse (14,500); College Park, Maryland |
| Feb 21, 1994* | | at Fordham | W 75–67 | 13–11 | Rose Hill Gymnasium (1,472); Bronx, New York |
| Feb 23, 1994 | | Manhattan | L 71–84 | 13–12 (5–8) | Reitz Arena; Baltimore, Maryland |
| Feb 27, 1994 | | Fairfield | W 80–73 | 14–12 (6–8) | Reitz Arena; Baltimore, Maryland |
MAAC tournament
| Mar 5, 1994* | (5) | vs. (4) Saint Peter's; Quarterfinals | W 87–80 ^{OT} | 15–12 | Times Union Center (4,231); Albany, New York |
| Mar 6, 1994* | (5) | vs. (1) Canisius; Semifinals | W 88–70 | 16–12 | Times Union Center; Albany, New York |
| Mar 7, 1994* | (5) | vs. (2) Manhattan; Championship game | W 80–75 | 17–12 | Times Union Center (6,465); Albany, New York |
NCAA tournament
| Mar 18, 1994* | (15 W) | vs. (2 W) No. 9 Arizona; First round | L 55–81 | 17–13 | ARCO Arena (16,477); Sacramento, California |
*Non-conference game. ^{#}Rankings from AP Poll. (#) Tournament seedings in parentheses. W=West.
