= Jason Rowe (basketball) =

American basketball player (born 1978)

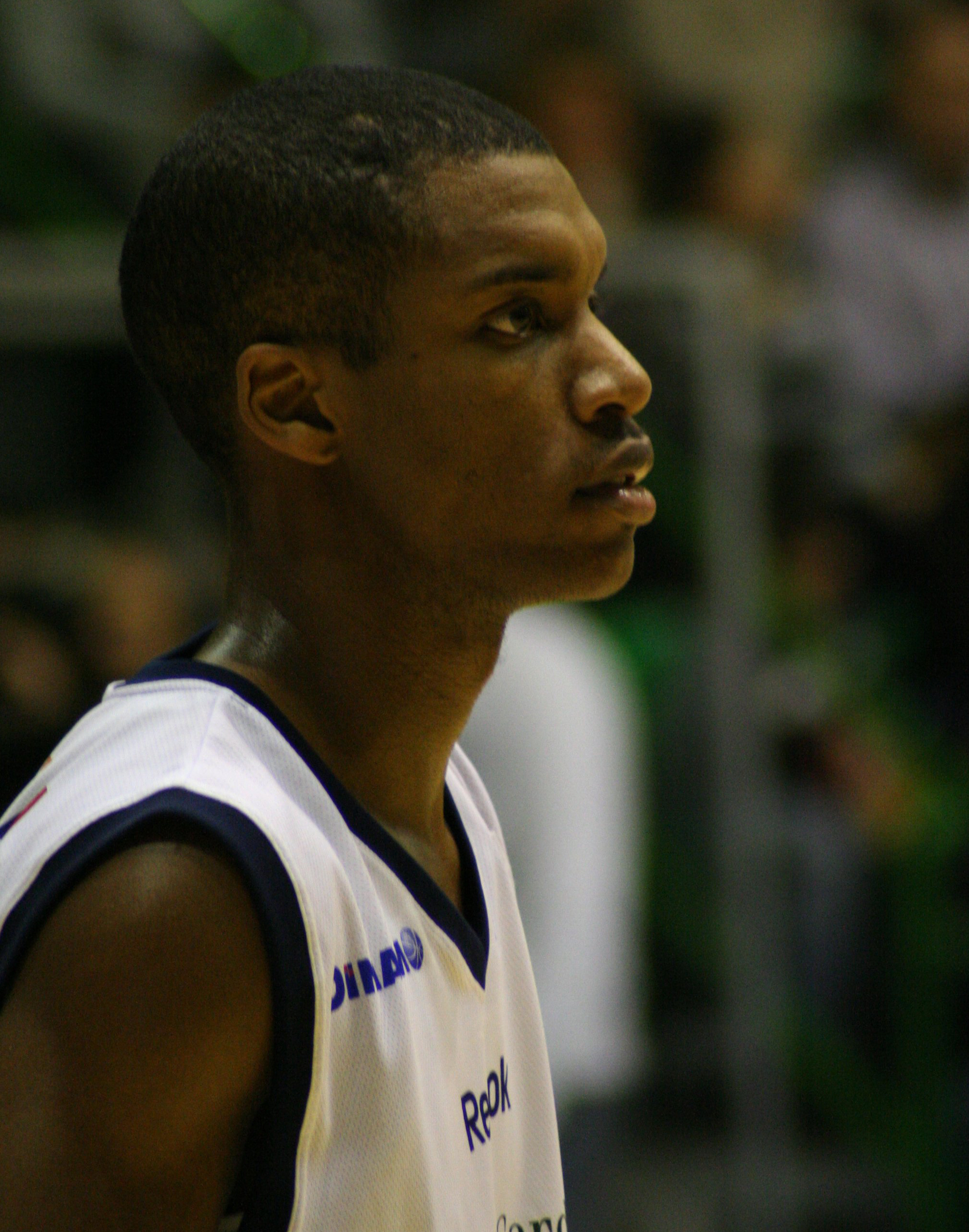
- Rowe playing for Dinamo Sassari in 2007

Personal information
- Born: June 16, 1978 (age 48) Buffalo, New York
- Listed height: 5 ft 10 in (1.78 m)
- Listed weight: 176 lb (80 kg)

Career information
- High school: Buffalo Traditional (Buffalo, New York)
- College: Loyola (Maryland) (1996–2000)
- NBA draft: 2000: undrafted
- Playing career: 2000–2015
- Position: Point guard

Career history
- 2000: APOEL
- 2001: Elitzur Ashkelon
- 2001: Spójnia Stargard
- 2001–2002: ALM Évreux
- 2002: Independiente General Pico
- 2002–2003: BCM Gravelines
- 2003–2006: Hyères-Toulon
- 2006–2007: Basket Livorno
- 2007: JDA Dijon
- 2007–2008: P.A.O.K.
- 2008–2010: Dinamo Sassari
- 2010–2011: Tofaş
- 2011: Veroli Basket
- 2012–2013: BC Odesa
- 2013: KAOD
- 2013–2014: CB Valladolid
- 2014: AS Salé
- 2014–2015: UB Chartres Métropole

Career highlights
- LegaDue Italian Cup MVP (2010); LNB Pro A Foreign MVP (2006); LNB Pro A Best Scorer (2006); 2× LNB Pro A All-Star (2003, 2005); First-team All-MAAC (1999); Second-team All-MAAC (1998)

Jason L. Rowe (born June 16, 1978) is an American former professional basketball player. He played at Buffalo Traditional School in his native Buffalo, New York, leaving as the all-time leader in points and assists, and then signed to play college basketball for the Loyola Greyhounds in the MAAC, where he was a two-time all-conference performer.

After his senior year at Loyola, he went undrafted in the 2000 NBA draft and moved to Cyprus, where he made his professional debut with APOEL. In his 15-year career he has played in Argentina, Cyprus, France, Greece, Israel, Morocco, Poland, Spain, Turkey, and Ukraine; in 2006 he was the top scorer of the LNB Pro A, the top level of French basketball, and was named the league's Foreign MVP the same year.

Rowe is currently head coach of Bishop Timon – St. Jude High School.

== High school career ==
Jason Rowe was born in Buffalo, New York; his family enjoyed basketball: his father Jerry played in high school and was a local scout, while uncle Lester Rowe played in the NCAA Division I for the West Virginia Mountaineers. Rowe started playing the sport at a very young age, and when he was 8 years old he was playing with older kids (aged 13 and under). He enrolled at Buffalo Traditional School in the fifth grade, and in the 8th grade he participated in a basketball camp organized by Georgia Tech. In his freshman year he was already considered one of Traditional's varsity team best players. Playing under coach Joe Cardinal, Rowe averaged 23 points, 6 rebounds and 12 assists per game in his sophomore season.

In his junior year, Rowe was named in the Class C first team. He was described by The Baltimore Sun as a 5-foot-9, 155-pounds point guard with good court vision and a 36-inches vertical leap. Rowe averaged 22 points, 12 assists and 5 steals his junior year. He and Tim Winn were named co-Players of the Year by The Buffalo News. The summer before his senior year, Rowe took part in the ABCD Camp, where he got injured. In his senior year at Traditional, Rowe won the 1996 Class C state title and was an all-state first team selection. That year he averaged 24 points, 6 rebounds, 8 assists and 5 steals per game, and shot 58% from the field; he also recorded a quadruple double with 36 points, 13 rebounds, 10 assists and 11 steals in a game against Lafayette High School. The Racine Journal Times mentioned him as one of top 100 seniors in the nation. He and Winn again shared Buffalo News Player of the Year honors. Rowe was the first player in the state of New York to score more than 2,000 points and record more than 1,000 assists. He finished his career at Buffalo Traditional with a school record 2,286 points (some other sources state 2,327), 1,098 assists and more than 500 rebounds and 500 steals. He ranks among the best scorers in the history of New York state high school basketball and according to the National Federation of State High School Associations his 1,098 career assists are the 10th highest mark in U.S. high school basketball history.

In 2009 as The Buffalo News celebrated 50 years of All-Western New York (WNY) basketball selections, Rowe, who was thrice an All-WNY first team selection was a third team selection for the All-time All-WNY team along with Gary Bossert, Jonny Flynn, Aaron Curry, and Jimmy "Bug" Williams.

== College career ==
Rowe drew marginal interest by big Division I programs, and received generic letters by Duke and Michigan. He was recruited by Marquette and Loyola (MD); he decided to sign for Loyola in early November 1995, and chose to major in elementary education. Coach Brian Ellerbe, who had recruited Rowe, included him in the starting lineup since the beginning of the season, and he started all 27 games. Rowe averaged 13.7 points, 3.2 rebounds and 4.1 assists, was the best assistman on the team, and he was the third best scorer behind junior guard Mike Powell and senior forward Anthony Smith. Rowe was a candidate for the MAAC Rookie of the Year award, which went to Ricky Bellinger of Saint Peter's, and led the MAAC freshmen in assists, steals and 3-point field goals.

For Rowe's sophomore season Ellerbe left the team, being replaced by Dino Gaudio. On December 13, 1997 Rowe recorded a career-high 10 assists against Towson. On January 4, 1998 Rowe recorded 7 steals against Saint Peter's, one of the best marks in school history. On January 25, 1998, Rowe converted 7 three-pointers, which at the time was tied for the highest in a single game in Loyola history. Rowe improved his scoring average to 18.1 points per game, which ranked second on the team and on the entire MAAC conference, behind teammate Mike Powell. He also led the conference in total steals (86) and steals per game (3.1), while he ranked second in assists to Siena guard Melvin Freeny. His 3.1 steals per game ranked 4th in the entire Division I. His 152 total assists in '98 were among the top-5 in school history, while his 86 steals were a new school record. At the end of the season he was named in the All-MAAC Second Team.

In his junior season, Rowe was considered one of the best players of the MAAC, and led his team in points, assists and steals per game, recording 161 total assists (among the best result in Loyola history) and established Loyola's all-time high for steals in a single season with 95. He played 956 total minutes, for a 34.1 per game average. His 3.4 steals per game also ranked third in the whole Division I, behind Shawnta Rogers' 3.6 and Tim Winn's 3.5. Rowe tied his career high in assists with 10 on November 28, 1998 against Kent State. He also recorded his career-high in points per game with 21.9, and led the MAAC in assists per game (5.8) and steals per game (3.4). At the end of the year, Rowe was an All-MAAC First Team selection.

Rowe's senior season saw him starting well: on November 20, 1999 he recorded 8 steals against UMBC, and on January 5, 2000 Rowe again tied his career high in assists with 10 against Canisius. On January 28, 2000, Rowe was expelled by the academic board of Loyola for poor academic performance, after his grade-point average had fallen in the previous weeks. This effectively ended Rowe's career in college basketball; he retired as the top 3-point shooter in Loyola history with 186 3-point field goals made (the record has since been surpassed and Rowe is 5th as of 2019). His 486 total assists were the second-best mark at Loyola, while his 272 steals are an all-time record at Loyola; the record still stands as of 2019. He also scored 1,678 total points, which at the end of his career were the 5th best mark in school history. The Loyola Greyhounds list Rowe's total career points at 1,703.

=== College statistics ===
Year	Team	GP	GS	MPG	FG%	3P%	FT%	RPG	APG	SPG	BPG	PPG
1996–97	Loyola (MD)	27	27	33.6	.458	.349	.745	3.2	4.1	2.0	0.3	13.7
1997–98	Loyola (MD)	28	27	36.9	.441	.339	.776	5.3	5.4	3.1	0.1	18.1
1998–99	Loyola (MD)	28		34.1	.505	.360	.787	4.9	5.8	3.4	0.1	21.9
1999–00	Loyola (MD)	12	12	36.8	.435	.317	.778	5.4	5.2	3.0	0.1	17.9
Career		95		35.4	.465	.344	.773	4.6	5.1	2.9	0.1	17.9

== Professional career ==
After his senior year of college, Rowe was automatically eligible for the 2000 NBA draft: he had drawn NBA interest in his junior year of college, but was not selected in the draft. He was drafted in the 2000 USBL draft (74th overall) by the Washington Congressionals, but did not sign for the team and instead went to Cyprus, making his professional debut in the Cyprus Basketball Division A. In 2001 he joined Elitzur Ashkelon of the Israeli Basketball Premier League, where he averaged 18.7 points, 2.9 rebounds and 3 assists over 18 games. Later in 2001 he signed for Spójnia Stargard, a team of the Polish Basketball League: Spójnia Stargard had issues paying his salary, and Rowe left the team after 5 games during which he had averaged 11.2 points, 4 rebounds and 3.2 assists. For the 2001–02 season he played for ALM Évreux in the LNB Pro B, the second level of French basketball, and averaged 21 points, 4.3 rebounds and 8.3 assists, shooting 55.2% from the field (42.9% on three-pointers). He also had a brief stint at Independiente de General Pico in the Argentine Liga Nacional de Básquet: in 10 games he averaged 24.2 points, 3.3 rebounds and 5.4 assists, shooting 39% from three.

In 2002 he signed for BCM Gravelines, making his debut in the LNB Pro A, France's top league. He also had the chance to play at international level, and appeared in 2 games of the 2002–03 ULEB Cup, averaging 7.5 points, 3 rebounds and 2.5 assists in 21.5 minutes per game. He also played 4 Pro A games, averaging 6.8 points. In 2003 he joined Hyères-Toulon Var (HTV), and played 29 games in the 2003–04 season, averaging 19.5 points and 6.8 assists per game; in the following season he slightly improved his scoring average to 19.6 points over 32 appearances, shooting 36.5% from three. In 2005–06 Rowe had his best season in Pro A: he scored 21 points per game, and added 3.5 rebounds and 6.6 assists, shooting 37.2% from behind the arc and 80.8% on free throws. He was the top scorer of the league, and was also named the LNB Pro A Foreign MVP.

After his MVP performance in France Rowe signed for Basket Livorno, a team of the Italian Serie A. He played 25 games (34.2 minutes per game), and posted averages of 15 points, 2.6 rebounds and 3.9 assists (which ranked 4th in Serie A behind Michael-Hakim Jordan, Terrell McIntyre and Randolph Childress). After his season in Livorno Rowe went back to France, and signed for JDA Dijon, where he was preferred to Lee Humphrey. After 6 games for Dijon Rowe left the team and signed for P.A.O.K., a team of the Greek Basket League. In the 2007–08 season Rowe appeared in 12 games, averaging 9.6 points and 3.8 assists. He then spent two seasons with Dinamo Sassari of LegaDue, the second level of Italian basketball. In his first season he averaged 19.2 points and 4.9 assists, while in the following season his averages decreased to 17.7 points and 4.3 assists. In 2010 his team earned the promotion in Serie A, and Rowe was also named MVP of the LegaDue Italian Cup.

In 2010 he left Italy for Turkey and joined Tofaş S.K. of Bursa, in the Turkish Basketball League. He played 30 games with the team, and averaged 13.2 points, 3 rebounds and 4.6 assists per game. He then went back to Italy and played for Veroli Basket in LegaDue; he left the team in December and was replaced by B. J. Elder. In February 2012 he signed for BC Odesa of the Ukrainian Basketball SuperLeague, and played 12 games with the team during the 2011–12 season (12.4 points, 5.1 assists). He joined Greek team KAOD in January 2013 and appeared in 12 games before leaving the team. In 2013 he was signed by Liga ACB side CB Valladolid, and he played 18 games in the 2013–14 ACB season, with averages of 8.4 points, 2.1 rebounds and 3.6 assists. He was named ACB Player of the Week on week 7. After a brief stint at AS Salé of Morocco, Rowe retired after the 2014–15 season, spent in the Nationale Masculine 1 (third level of French basketball) with UB Chartres Métropole.

== Coaching career ==
Rowe has been head coach at Bishop Timon – St. Jude High School since July 2017. They reached the CHSAA Championship Game in March 2023, losing to Monsignor Farrell High School. In March 2024 they again played in the CHSAA Championship Game, losing to Chaminade High School.
