= Horizon League =

College sports league in the United States

- Formerly: Midwestern City Conference (1979–1985); Midwestern Collegiate Conference (1985–2001)
- Association: NCAA
- Founded: 1979; 47 years ago
- Commissioner: Jill Bodensteiner (since 2026)
- Sports fielded: 19; men's: 9; women's: 10
- Division: Division I
- Subdivision: non-football
- No. of teams: 12 + 3 affiliate members
- Headquarters: Indianapolis, Indiana
- Region: Midwest; East North Central; Northeast; Mid-Atlantic; Southern; East South Central
- Broadcaster: ESPN
- Website: horizonleague.org

Locations
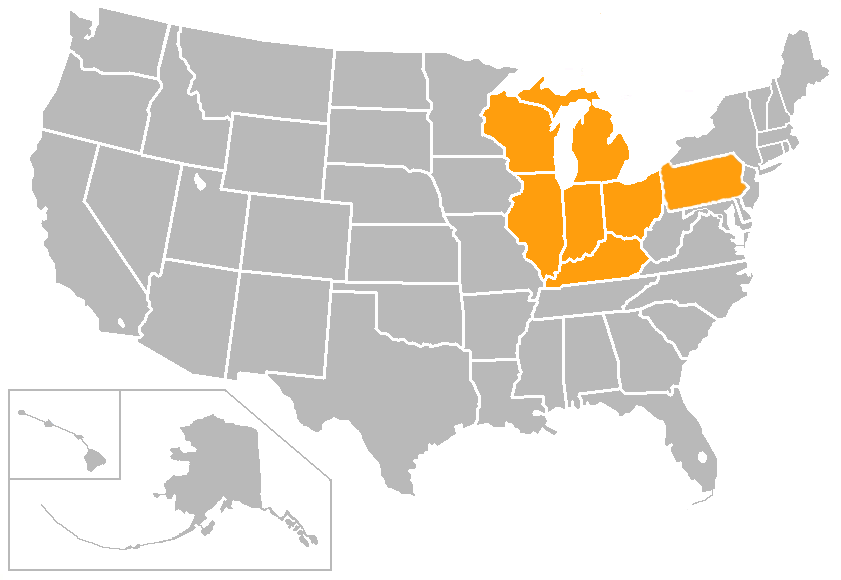

The Horizon League is a collegiate athletic conference in the National Collegiate Athletic Association (NCAA) Division I. Headquartered in Indianapolis, the league's 12 member schools are primarily located in and near the Great Lakes region of the United States.

The Horizon League founded in 1979 as the Midwestern City Conference. The conference changed its name to Midwestern Collegiate Conference in 1985 and then the Horizon League in 2001. The conference started with a membership of six teams and has fluctuated in size with 24 different schools as members at different times. The league currently has 12 members, sponsors 19 sports, and is a non-football conference.

== History ==
=== Foundation (1978–1979) ===
In May 1978, DePaul University hosted a meeting with representatives from Bradley, Dayton, Detroit, Illinois State, Loyola–Chicago, Air Force, and Xavier who all agreed in principle that a new athletic conference was needed. Further progress was made through a series of early 1979 meetings in San Francisco, Chicago, and St. Louis that included participation by Butler, Creighton, Marquette, and Oral Roberts. On June 16, 1979, the Midwestern City Conference (nicknamed the MCC or Midwestern City 6) was formed by charter members Butler, Evansville, Loyola, Oklahoma City, Oral Roberts, and Xavier, with Detroit joining the following year. As of the 2026–27 academic year, Detroit, now known as Detroit Mercy, is the only remaining member from the league's original members.

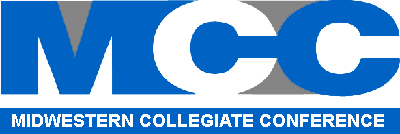
Midwestern Collegiate Conference logo from 1985 to 2001

=== Maturity (1980–1993) ===
In 1980, the league established its headquarters in Champaign, Illinois. The MCC gained an automatic bid to the NCAA Division I men's basketball tournament in 1981, followed by the announcement that Saint Louis University would be joining the following season. The University of Notre Dame joined the conference for all sports except basketball and football in 1982. The conference attained automatic qualification for the NCAA Division I Baseball Championship in 1984 and the conference moved its headquarters to Indianapolis. Three changes occurred in the summer of 1985: Oklahoma City dropped out of the NCAA altogether; the conference name was altered slightly to Midwestern Collegiate Conference; and the conference began sponsoring women's athletics. The latter triggered Notre Dame's temporary withdrawal from the league as its women's teams were contracted to the North Star Conference. ESPN began televising the MCC Championship game in 1986. In 1987, Oral Roberts left the conference while Dayton joined and Notre Dame rejoined. The conference earned its first at-large bid to the men's basketball tournament and automatic qualification to the NCAA Division I men's soccer tournament in 1989. In 1991, the conference received an automatic bid to the NCAA Division I women's basketball tournament and lost members Marquette and Saint Louis. Duquesne and La Salle joined the MCC in 1992, the same year the conference gained an automatic berth to the NCAA Division I women's volleyball tournament. Duquesne and Dayton left the conference in 1993.

=== Modern era (1993–present) ===
Horizon League logo used as a secondary logo from 2001 to 2014 and primary logo from 2014 to 2024. The shade of gold was changed to the above version in 2023.

The league's modern era began on December 9, 1993, when Cleveland State, UIC, Northern Illinois, Green Bay, Milwaukee, and Wright State left the Mid-Continent Conference to join the Midwestern Collegiate Conference beginning with the 1994–95 academic year. At the time, this was the largest non-merger conference expansion in NCAA history, a record surpassed by the seven-member addition to the Pac-12 Conference in 2026. With Evansville's departure to the Missouri Valley Conference, there were 12 league members. Xavier, Notre Dame, and La Salle withdrew the following summer of 1995, followed by Northern Illinois in 1997. The conference changed its name to the Horizon League on June 4, 2001, in part due to the initials causing confusion between the MCC and the Mid-Continent Conference, who also used the initials. That year, Youngstown State University joined from the Mid-Continent Conference, and on May 17, 2006, Valparaiso University announced it would do the same in 2007. In April 2013, the split of the original Big East Conference caused a ripple effect that fell to the Horizon League; Loyola announced that it would leave the Horizon League effective July 1 to join the Missouri Valley Conference, which itself lost Creighton to the reconfigured Big East.

Butler also left the Horizon League. It spent a season in the Atlantic 10 Conference before joining the Big East.

In June 2013, the Horizon League announced that Oakland University, formerly of the Summit League, would immediately replace Loyola within a month.

The next change in the Horizon League's membership came in 2015 with the arrival of Northern Kentucky University from the Atlantic Sun Conference.

Two more membership changes were announced near the end of the 2016–17 school year. Valparaiso announced on May 25, 2017, that it would leave for the Missouri Valley Conference effective July 1. The Crusaders replaced Wichita State, which announced that it would leave for the American Athletic Conference. Three days before Valparaiso's departure, the Horizon League Board of Directors unanimously approved the membership of Indiana University-Purdue University Indianapolis (IUPUI) to replace Valparaiso, also effective July 1. IUPUI was dissolved in 2024 and replaced by separate institutions affiliated with the Indiana University and Purdue University systems. At that time, the athletic program transferred to the new Indiana University Indianapolis with an athletic brand name of IU Indy, maintaining IUPUI's Division I and Horizon League memberships.

The start of the 2020s set further membership changes into motion, with the arrivals of Purdue Fort Wayne and Robert Morris from the Summit League and the Northeast Conference, respectively, announced on August 5, 2019, and June 15, 2020. This brought the Horizon League up to 12 full-time members for the first time since the 1994–95 season. It was short-lived, however, as the UIC Flames were reported to be following many of their former conference colleagues to the Missouri Valley Conference effective July 1, 2022.

On July 6, 2022, the Horizon League and Ohio Valley Conference (OVC) jointly announced that they would merge their men's tennis leagues under the Horizon League banner, effective immediately. The five OVC members that sponsored the sport became Horizon associates. At the same time, the Horizon announced that Belmont, which had just left the OVC for the Missouri Valley Conference (which sponsors tennis only for women), would become a men's tennis associate, and Chicago State, which became a D-I independent after leaving the Western Athletic Conference days earlier, would become an associate in both men's and women's tennis. The Horizon later lost men's associate Lindenwood when they dropped nine NCAA sports, including men's tennis, after the 2023–24 season. Men's and women's associate Chicago State also announced it would join the Northeast Conference, which sponsors both men's and women's tennis; however, CSU announced that it would keep its tennis programs in the Horizon League for one extra year before moving them to the NEC for the 2025–26 season.

Prior to the 2023–24 academic year, the conference announced a brand refresh with the introduction of a new secondary logo. The logo is a gold stylized H that incorporates the arch of the conference's primary logo and a number one to symbolize unity. The logo was promoted to primary status ahead of the 2024–25 academic year.

On February 24, 2025, multiple media reports indicated that Northern Illinois was set to rejoin the Horizon League in 2026, coinciding with NIU football becoming an affiliate member of the Mountain West Conference. The move became official on February 27, after approval by NIU's governing board. That May, men's tennis affiliate Eastern Illinois announced it was dropping that sport effective immediately, citing issues stemming from the impending settlement of the House v. NCAA legal case.

On October 30, 2025, conference commissioner Julie Roe Lach, who had served in the position since 2021, was announced to be leaving the conference at the end of the fall 2025 semester to join Pacers Sports & Entertainment as executive vice president. On December 1, COO Christine Neuman took over as interim commissioner during the search for a permanent replacement.

As of the 2026–27 academic year, nine of the 12 full Horizon League members are former members of the Mid-Con (now known as the Summit League), with the exceptions being Detroit Mercy, Northern Kentucky, and Robert Morris.

== Member schools ==
=== Current full members ===
Institution	Location	Founded	Type	Enrollment (Note: As of the 2026-27 academic year.)	Endowment (millions)	Nickname	Joined (Note: Represents the calendar year when fall sports competition begins.)	Colors
Cleveland State University	Cleveland, Ohio	1964	Public	13,161	$143.7	Vikings	1994	
University of Detroit Mercy	Detroit, Michigan	1877	Catholic (Jesuit)	5,587	$128.8	Titans	1980	
University of Wisconsin–Green Bay (Green Bay)	Green Bay, Wisconsin	1965	Public	11,555	$61.8	Phoenix	1994	
Indiana University Indianapolis (Note: IU Indy joined the Horizon League as IUPUI, representing the former Indiana University-Purdue University Indianapolis. IUPUI was dissolved in 2024 and replaced by separate institutions affiliated with the Indiana University and Purdue University systems. The athletic program transferred to the new IU Indianapolis with a primary branding as IU Indy.) (IU Indy)	Indianapolis, Indiana	1969 (Note: IU Indy did not exist until 2024, but inherited its athletic program from IUPUI, founded in 1969.)	Public	20,677	$1,147.6	Jaguars	2017	
University of Wisconsin–Milwaukee (Milwaukee)	Milwaukee, Wisconsin	1956	Public	22,909	$160.0	Panthers	1994	
Northern Illinois University	DeKalb, Illinois	1895	Public	16,078	$122.6	Huskies	2026 (Note: Northern Illinois was previously a full member of the Horizon from 1994–95 to 1996–97.)	
Northern Kentucky University	Highland Heights, Kentucky	1968	Public	15,370	$150.9	Norse	2015	
Oakland University	Rochester, Michigan (Note: The Oakland campus has a Rochester mailing address, but is located in the separate cities of Auburn Hills and Rochester Hills. The university administration is in Auburn Hills; athletic facilities are in both cities.)	1957	Public	15,979	$166.4	Golden; Grizzlies	2013	
Purdue University Fort Wayne	Fort Wayne, Indiana	1964 (Note: Purdue Fort Wayne (PFW) did not begin operation until 2018, but inherited its athletic program from Indiana University-Purdue University Fort Wayne (IPFW), founded in 1964. IPFW was dissolved in 2018 by the IU and Purdue systems, with each system establishing a new Fort Wayne institution.)	Public	5,013	$70.0	Mastodons	2020	
Robert Morris University	Moon Township, Pennsylvania	1921	Nonsectarian	4,316	$53.9	Colonials	2020	
Wright State University	Fairborn, Ohio (Note: The Wright State campus is physically located in Fairborn but has a Dayton mailing address.)	1964	Public	10,615	$126.8	Raiders	1994	
Youngstown State University	Youngstown, Ohio	1908	Public	12,420	$399.9	Penguins	2001	

=== Associate members ===
Institution	Location	Founded	Type	Enrollment	Nickname	Joined (Note: Represents the calendar year when fall sports competition begins.)	Horizon sport(s)	Primary conference
Belmont University (Note: Belmont previously competed in the Horizon as an associate member for men's soccer from the 2014 to 2017 fall seasons (2014–15 to 2017–18 school years).)	Nashville, Tennessee	1890	Nondenominational	8,700	Bruins	2022	Men's tennis	Missouri Valley (MVC)
Oral Roberts University	Tulsa, Oklahoma	1963	Evangelical	5,936	Golden Eagles	2026 (Note: Oral Roberts was previously a full member of the Horizon from 1979–80 to 1986–87.)	Men's tennis	Summit
University of Southern Indiana	Evansville, Indiana (Note: The campus has an Evansville mailing address but is located in unincorporated Vanderburgh County.)	1965	Public	9,758	Screaming; Eagles	2022	Men's tennis	Ohio Valley (OVC)
Tennessee State University	Nashville, Tennessee	1912	Public (Note: Also a historically black college and university.)	8,775	Tigers	2022	Men's tennis	Ohio Valley (OVC)

=== Former full members ===
Nicknames and school names reflect those used in the last school year of conference membership.

Institution	Location	Founded	Type	Nickname	Joined (Note: Represents the calendar year when fall sports competition begins.)	Left (Note: Represents the calendar year when spring sports competition ends.)	Subsequent conference(s)	Current conference
Butler University	Indianapolis, Indiana	1855	Nonsectarian (Note: Historically affiliated with the Christian Church (Disciples of Christ).)	Bulldogs	1979	2012	Atlantic 10 (A10) (2012–13)	Big East (2013–present)
University of Dayton	Dayton, Ohio	1850	Catholic (Marianists)	Flyers	1987	1993	Great Midwest (GMC) (1993–95)	Atlantic 10 (A10) (1995–present)
Duquesne University	Pittsburgh, Pennsylvania	1878	Catholic (Spiritans)	Dukes	1992	1993	Atlantic 10 (A10) (1993–present)	
University of Evansville	Evansville, Indiana	1854	United; Methodist	Purple Aces	1979	1994	Missouri Valley (MVC) (1994–present)	
University of Illinois Chicago (UIC)	Chicago, Illinois	1946	Public	Flames	1994	2022	Missouri Valley (MVC) (2022–present)	
La Salle University	Philadelphia, Pennsylvania	1863	Catholic (De La Salle; Brothers)	Explorers	1992	1995	Atlantic 10 (A10) (1995–present)	
Loyola University Chicago	Chicago, Illinois	1870	Catholic (Jesuit)	Ramblers	1979	2013	Missouri Valley (MVC) (2013–22)	Atlantic 10 (A10) (2022–present)
Marquette University	Milwaukee, Wisconsin	1881	Catholic (Jesuit)	Warriors (Note: Marquette adopted its current nickname of Golden Eagles in 1994.)	1988 (Note: The Marquette men's basketball team joined the Horizon League a year after becoming a full member for other sports (1989–90).)	1991	Various (Note: Marquette had various subsequent conference affiliations: the Great Midwest Conference (GMC) from 1991–92 to 1994–95; Conference USA (CUSA) from 1995–96 to 2004–05; and the original incarnation of the Big East Conference from 2005–06 to 2012–13.)	Big East (2013–present)
University of Notre Dame	Notre Dame, Indiana	1842	Catholic (CSC)	Fighting Irish	1982	1986	Big East (1995–2013)	Atlantic Coast (ACC) (2013–present)
University of Notre Dame	Notre Dame, Indiana	1842	Catholic (CSC)	Fighting Irish	1987 (Note: Notre Dame rejoined the Horizon (then the MCC) for all men's sports except basketball after a season as an Independent (1986–87 school year). Its women's sports, which had been in the North Star Conference since the 1983–84 school year, moved to the then-MCC, beginning the following season (1988–89).)	1995	Big East (1995–2013)	Atlantic Coast (ACC) (2013–present)
Oklahoma City University	Oklahoma City, Oklahoma	1904	United; Methodist	Chiefs (Note: Oklahoma City adopted its current nickname of Stars since 1999.)	1979	1985	NAIA Independent (1985–86)	Sooner (SAC) (Note: Currently an NAIA athletic conference.) (1986–present)
Oral Roberts University	Tulsa, Oklahoma	1963	Evangelical	Titans (Note: Oral Roberts adopted its current nickname of Golden Eagles since 1993.)	1979	1987	Various (Note: Oral Roberts had various subsequent conference affiliations: as an NCAA D-I Independent from 1987–88 to 1988–89, and again from 1991–92 to 1996–97; as an NAIA Independent from 1989–90 to 1990–91; the Mid-Continent Conference (Mid-Con) from 1997–98 to 2011–12; and the Southland Conference (SLC) from 2012–13 to 2013–14.)	Summit (2014–present)
Saint Louis University	St. Louis, Missouri	1818	Catholic (Jesuit)	Billikens	1981 (Note: The Saint Louis men's basketball team joined the Horizon League a year after it became a full member for other sports (1982–83).)	1991	Various (Note: Saint Louis had various subsequent conference affiliations: the Great Midwest Conference (GMC) from 1991–92 to 1994–95; and Conference USA (CUSA) from 1995–96 to 2004–05.)	Atlantic 10 (A10) (2005–present)
Valparaiso University	Valparaiso, Indiana	1859	Lutheran	Crusaders (Note: Valparaiso adopted its current nickname of Beacons since 2021.)	2007	2017	Missouri Valley (MVC) (2017–present)	
Xavier University	Cincinnati, Ohio	1831	Catholic (Jesuit)	Musketeers	1979	1995	Atlantic 10 (A10) (1995–2013)	Big East (2013–present)

=== Former associate members ===
Institution	Location	Founded	Type	Nickname	Joined (Note: Represents the calendar year when fall sports competition begins.)	Left (Note: Represents the calendar year when spring sports competition ends.)	Colors	Horizon sport(s)	Primary conference	Current conference in former Horizon sport(s)
Belmont University (Note: Belmont remains in the Horizon as an associate member for men's tennis.)	Nashville, Tennessee	1890	Nondenominational	Bruins	2014	2018		Men's soccer	Missouri Valley (MVC)	
Chicago State University	Chicago, Illinois	1867	Public (TMCF)	Cougars	2022	2025		Men's tennis	Northeast (NEC) (Note: During its first two years as a Horizon affiliate (2022–2024), Chicago State was a Division I independent.)	
Chicago State University	Chicago, Illinois	1867	Public (TMCF)	Cougars	2022	2025		Women's tennis	Northeast (NEC)	
Eastern Illinois University	Charleston, Illinois	1895	Public	Panthers	2022	2025		Men's tennis	Ohio Valley (OVC)	N/A (Note: Eastern Illinois dropped men's tennis at the end of the 2024–25 school year.)
Lindenwood University	St. Charles, Missouri	1827	Nonsectarian	Lions	2022	2024		Men's tennis	Ohio Valley (OVC)	N/A (Note: Lindenwood dropped men's tennis at the end of the 2023–24 school year.)
Tennessee Technological University (Tennessee Tech)	Cookeville, Tennessee	1915	Public	Golden; Eagles	2022	2026		Men's tennis	Southern (SoCon) (Note: Tennessee Tech was a full member of the Ohio Valley Conference throughout its tenure as a Horizon affiliate.)	

=== Membership timeline ===
Full member (all sports) Associate member (sport) Other Conference Other Conference

Notes

- During the 1987–88 school year, Notre Dame competed in the Division I ranks of the National Collegiate Athletic Association (NCAA) as an Independent.
- During the 1985–86 school year, Oklahoma City competed in the National Association of Intercollegiate Athletics (NAIA) as an Independent.
- During the 1981–82 school year, UIC competed in the Division I ranks of the National Collegiate Athletic Association (NCAA) as an Independent.

== Sponsored sports ==
The Horizon League sponsors championship competition in nine men's and ten women's NCAA sanctioned sports:

Teams in Horizon League competition
Sport	Men's	Women's
Baseball	6	–
Basketball	12	12
Cross country	10	12
Golf	11	8
Soccer	11	12
Softball	–	8
Swimming and diving	7	7
Tennis	9	7
Track and field (indoor)	8	11
Track and field (outdoor)	8	11
Volleyball	–	11

=== Men's sponsored sports by school ===
School	Baseball	Basketball	Cross Country	Golf	Soccer	Swimming & Diving	Tennis	Track & Field (Indoor)	Track & Field (Outdoor)	Total Horizon Sports
Cleveland State	No	Yes	No	Yes	Yes	Yes	Yes	No	No	5
Detroit Mercy	No	Yes	Yes	Yes	Yes	No	No	Yes	Yes	6
Green Bay	No	Yes	Yes	Yes	Yes	Yes	No	No	No	5
IU Indy	No	Yes	Yes	Yes	Yes	Yes	Yes	Yes	Yes	8
Milwaukee	Yes	Yes	Yes	No	Yes	Yes	No	Yes	Yes	7
Northern Illinois	Yes	Yes	No	Yes	Yes	No	Yes	No	No	5
Northern Kentucky	Yes	Yes	Yes	Yes	Yes	Yes	Yes	Yes	Yes	9
Oakland	Yes	Yes	Yes	Yes	Yes	Yes	No	Yes	Yes	8
Purdue Fort Wayne	No	Yes	Yes	Yes	Yes	No	No	Yes	Yes	6
Robert Morris	No	Yes	Yes	Yes	Yes	No	No	No	No	4
Wright State	Yes	Yes	Yes	Yes	Yes	No	No	Yes	Yes	7
Youngstown State	Yes	Yes	Yes	Yes	No	Yes	Yes	Yes	Yes	8
Associate members
Belmont							Yes			1
Oral Roberts							Yes			1
Southern Indiana							Yes			1
Tennessee State							Yes			1
Totals	6	12	10	11	11	7	9	8	8	82

Men's varsity sports not sponsored by the Horizon League which are played by Horizon schools:

School	Fencing	Football	Ice hockey	Lacrosse	Skiing (Note: NCAA skiing is a coeducational sport, with schools fielding men's and women's squads.)	Volleyball	Wrestling
Cleveland State	Independent	No	No	NEC	No	No	No
Detroit Mercy	Independent	No	No	NEC	No	No	No
Green Bay	No	No	No	No	CCSA (Note: NCAA skiing includes both Nordic and Alpine disciplines, but Green Bay fields only a Nordic team.)	No	No
Northern Illinois	No	Mountain West	No	No	No	No	Pac-12
Northern Kentucky	No	No	No	No	No	MIVA	No
Purdue Fort Wayne	No	No	No	No	No	MIVA	No
Robert Morris	No	NEC	AHA	NEC	No	No	No
Youngstown State	No	MVFC	No	No	No	No	No

In addition to the above sports, Northern Kentucky also sponsors men's triathlon, which has no NCAA recognition of any kind.

=== Women's sponsored sports by school ===
School	Basketball	Cross Country	Golf	Soccer	Softball	Swimming & Diving	Tennis	Track & Field (Indoor)	Track & Field (Outdoor)	Volleyball	Total Horizon Sports
Cleveland State	Yes	Yes	No	Yes	No	Yes	Yes	Yes	Yes	Yes	8
Detroit Mercy	Yes	Yes	Yes	Yes	Yes	No	No	Yes	Yes	No	7
Green Bay	Yes	Yes	Yes	Yes	Yes	Yes	No	No	No	Yes	7
IU Indy	Yes	Yes	Yes	Yes	Yes	Yes	Yes	Yes	Yes	Yes	10
Milwaukee	Yes	Yes	No	Yes	No	Yes	Yes	Yes	Yes	Yes	8
Northern Illinois	Yes	Yes	Yes	Yes	Yes	No	Yes	Yes	Yes	Yes	9
Northern Kentucky	Yes	Yes	Yes	Yes	Yes	Yes	Yes	Yes	Yes	Yes	10
Oakland	Yes	Yes	Yes	Yes	Yes	Yes	Yes	Yes	Yes	Yes	10
Purdue Fort Wayne	Yes	Yes	Yes	Yes	No	No	No	Yes	Yes	Yes	8
Robert Morris	Yes	Yes	No	Yes	Yes	No	No	Yes	Yes	Yes	7
Wright State	Yes	Yes	No	Yes	No	No	No	Yes	Yes	Yes	6
Youngstown State	Yes	Yes	Yes	Yes	Yes	Yes	Yes	Yes	Yes	Yes	10
Totals	12	12	8	12	8	7	7	11	11	11	99

Women's varsity sports not sponsored by the Horizon League which are played by Horizon schools:

School	Bowling	Fencing	Gymnastics	Ice hockey	Lacrosse	Rowing	Skiing (Note: NCAA skiing is a coeducational sport, with schools fielding men's and women's squads.)	Stunt (Note: Graduated from the NCAA Emerging Sports for Women program in January 2026, with the first official NCAA championship taking place in 2026–27.)	Triathlon (Note: Part of the NCAA Emerging Sports for Women program.)
Cleveland State	No	CCFC	No	No	No	No	No	No	No
Detroit Mercy	No	CCFC	No	No	MAC	No	No	No	No
Green Bay	No	No	No	No	No	No	CCSA (Note: NCAA skiing includes both Nordic and Alpine disciplines, but Green Bay fields only a Nordic team.)	No	No
Northern Illinois	No	No	Mountain West	No	No	No	No	No	No
Northern Kentucky	No	No	No	No	No	No	No	Independent	Independent
Robert Morris	No	No	No	AHA	MAC	Metro	No	No	No
Wright State	CUSA	No	No	No	No	No	No	No	No
Youngstown State	CUSA	No	No	No	MAC	No	No	No	No

== Media rights ==
In 2006, the conference launched the Horizon League Network (HLN) as the centerpiece of a revamped web portal. The digital network aired over 200 live events free on the league's official website at the time.

The Horizon League Network migrated to ESPN3 in 2014, and over 700 events streamed live in 2015–16. Horizon League coverage was absorbed into ESPN+, along with other mid-major conferences, in 2018. The conference extended its deal with ESPN in 2021. Over 500 events are aired on ESPN+ annually, along with select men's basketball games airing on ESPN2 and ESPNU and the men's and women's basketball championships airing on ESPN and ESPNU.

Basketball games not selected for broadcast on national linear television are often televised by regional sports networks and over-the-air channels within the teams’ home markets. In recent years, WMYD Detroit, Marquee Sports Network, FanDuel Sports Network Ohio, FanDuel Sports Network Great Lakes, FanDuel Sports Network Wisconsin, and SportsNet Pittsburgh have broadcast multiple men's and women's basketball contests.

The Horizon League has also produced multiple podcasts and live events through its YouTube channel. From 2019 until 2024, the conference produced Reach the Horizon, a podcast hosted by Justin Kinner of WING, the ESPN-affiliated radio station in Dayton, which featured interviews with Horizon League coaches and players, as well as various media personalities. As of January 2026, the conference produces The Golden Hour Podcast and On the Horizon, a weekly show hosted by Greg Rakestraw that is simulcast on the Horizon League's YouTube channel and Indianapolis radio station 107.5 The Fan. The Horizon League also sponsors Expand Your Horizon: Preview Edition, which is independently produced by the HoriZone Roundtable, a fan-driven media site that covers the conference.

== Men's basketball ==
From 1995 to 2011, the Horizon League sent 24 qualifiers (7 at-large berths) to the NCAA Division I men's basketball tournament. Those 24 clubs produced 22 wins in that span, including five Sweet 16 appearances, making the Horizon League the only non-BCS conference to have Sweet 16 participants in five NCAA tournaments during that span (2003, 2005, 2007, 2010 and 2011). The Horizon League also compiled a 19–12 record in the NCAA tournament from 2003 to 2011, ranking tops among all 32 NCAA Division I conferences for winning percentage (.613) in March Madness during that span. Butler appeared in the men's national championship game in both 2010 and 2011. Since the NCAA began seeding teams in 1979, Loyola's 4 seed in the 1985 tournament is the best for a Horizon League team. The Horizon League currently holds the best winning percentage among non-BCS conferences in the men's NCAA basketball Tournament (.488, 7th overall amongst the 32 Division I conferences).

One former Horizon League member claims a national championship from the era before the league's creation. In the 1963 NCAA Division I men's basketball tournament, Loyola defeated two-time defending champ Cincinnati. Before post-season tournaments determined champions, former Horizon member Butler claimed national titles in 1924 and 1929.

The League hosted the men's Final Four in 1991, 1997, 2000, 2006, 2009, 2010, 2015, 2021, and 2026, and will host again in 2029. It also hosted the women's Final Four in 2005, 2007, 2011, and 2016, and will host again in 2028.

== Other sports ==
The Milwaukee baseball team made national headlines during the 1999 College World Series by upsetting No. 1 ranked Rice in the first round of the NCAA Tournament. In the 2004–05 academic year, Milwaukee's men's soccer team defeated 16th-ranked San Francisco, while Detroit upset Michigan in women's soccer in their respective NCAA tournaments. Also that year, Butler's men's cross country team finished fourth in the nation at the NCAA Division I men's cross country championships, and their own Victoria Mitchell became the first Horizon League athlete to win an individual national title when she captured the 3,000 Meter Steeplechase at the NCAA Outdoor Track and Field Championships. Green Bay also upset 6th-ranked Oregon State in the opening round of the NCAA softball tournament.

== Facilities ==
School	Soccer stadium	Capacity	Basketball arena	Capacity	Baseball field	Capacity	Softball field	Capacity
Cleveland State	Krenzler Field	1,680	Wolstein Center	13,610 (Note: Full capacity; for most games, Cleveland State limits capacity to 8,500.)	Non-baseball school		Viking Field	500
Detroit Mercy	Titan Soccer Field	500	Calihan Hall	8,295	Non-baseball school		Buysse Ballpark	500
Green Bay	Aldo Santaga Stadium	3,500	Resch Center (men); Kress Events Center (women)	9,729; 4,018	Non-baseball school		Phoenix Softball Field	500
IU Indy	Carroll Stadium	12,111	James T. Morris Arena (Note: Replaces The Jungle (capacity 1,215) as primary basketball home in 2026. Corteva Coliseum (capacity 6,800) has been used as a secondary home for men's basketball.)	4,500	Non-baseball school		IU Indy Softball Complex	500
Milwaukee	Engelmann Stadium	2,200	UW–Milwaukee Panther Arena (men); Klotsche Center (women)	10,783; 3,500	Franklin Field	4,000	Non-softball school	
Northern Illinois	NIU Soccer and Track & Field Complex	1,500	Convocation Center	10,000	Ralph McKinzie Field	1,500	Mary M. Bell Field	600
Northern Kentucky	NKU Soccer Stadium	1,000	Truist Arena	8,427	Bill Aker Baseball Complex	500	Frank Ignatius Grein Softball Field	500
Oakland	Oakland University Soccer Field	1,000	OU Credit Union O'rena	4,005	Oakland University Baseball Field	500	OU Softball Field	250
Purdue Fort Wayne	Hefner Soccer Complex	2,000	Hilliard Gates Sports Center; Allen County War Memorial Coliseum (special events)	1,800; 13,000	Non-baseball school		Non-softball school	
Robert Morris	North Athletic Complex	—N/a	UPMC Events Center	4,000	Non-baseball school		North Athletic Complex	—N/a
Wright State	Alumni Field	1,000	Nutter Center	10,449	Nischwitz Stadium	750	WSU Softball Field	—N/a
Youngstown State	Farmers National Bank Field	500	Beeghly Center; Covelli Centre (special events)	4,641; 5,900	Eastwood Field	6,300	YSU Softball Complex	500

== See also ==
- List of Horizon League champions
