= 1993–94 Big East Conference men's basketball season =

American college basketball season

1993–94 Big East Conference Men's Basketball Season
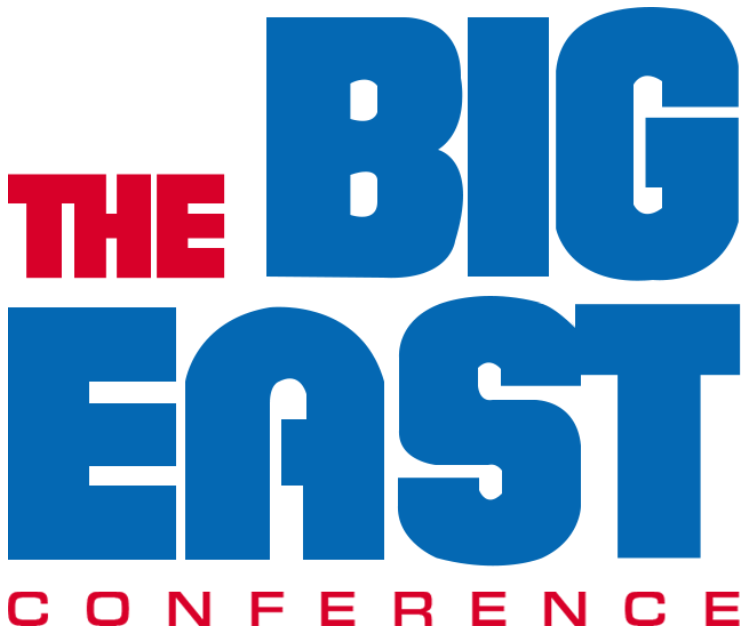
- League: NCAA Division I
- Sport: Basketball
- Duration: November 17, 1993 through March 13, 1994
- Teams: 10
- TV partner: ESPN

Regular Season
- Champion: Connecticut (16–2)
- Season MVP: Donyell Marshall – Connecticut

Tournament
- Champions: Providence
- Finals MVP: Michael Smith – Providence

Basketball seasons
- 1992–93 1994–95

1993–94 Big East men's basketball standings
	Conf.				Overall
Team	W		L	PCT	W		L	PCT
No. 4 Connecticut	16	–	2	.889	29	–	5	.853
No. 15 Syracuse	13	–	5	.722	23	–	7	.767
Boston College	11	–	7	.611	23	–	11	.676
Providence †	10	–	8	.556	20	–	10	.667
Villanova	10	–	8	.556	20	–	12	.625
Georgetown	10	–	8	.556	19	–	12	.613
Seton Hall	8	–	10	.444	17	–	13	.567
Pittsburgh	7	–	11	.389	13	–	14	.481
St. John's	5	–	13	.278	12	–	17	.414
Miami	0	–	18	.000	7	–	20	.259
† 1994 Big East tournament winner As of April 4, 1994; Rankings from AP poll

The 1993–94 Big East Conference men's basketball season was the 15th in conference history, and involved its ten full-time member schools.

Connecticut was the regular-season champion with a record of 16–2. Providence won the Big East tournament championship.

== Season summary & highlights ==
- Connecticut finished as the regular-season champion with a record of 16–2. It was the second regular-season championship or co-championship and first outright championship for Connecticut.
- Providence won its first Big East tournament championship.
- Villanova won the 1994 National Invitation Tournament championship.

== Head coaches ==
School	Coach	Season	Notes
Boston College	Jim O'Brien	8th	
Connecticut	Jim Calhoun	8th	Big East Coach of the Year (2nd award)
Georgetown	John Thompson, Jr.	22nd	
Miami	Leonard Hamilton	4th	
Pittsburgh	Paul Evans	8th	Fired March 10, 1994
Providence	Rick Barnes	6th	Resigned March 31, 1994
St. John's	Brian Mahoney	2nd	
Seton Hall	P. J. Carlesimo	12th	Resigned June 23, 1994
Syracuse	Jim Boeheim	18th	
Villanova	Steve Lappas	2nd	

== Rankings ==
1993–94 Big East Conference Weekly Rankings Key: ██ Increase in ranking. ██ Decrease in ranking.
AP Poll	Pre	11/22	11/29	12/6	12/13	12/20	12/27	1/3	1/10	1/17	1/24	1/31	2/7	2/14	2/21	2/28	3/7	Final
Boston College					20	18	23	20	20						21	23		
Connecticut				21	16	15	14	16	14	10	6	5	6	3	5	4	2	4
Georgetown	15	15	25															
Miami																		
Pittsburgh																		
Providence																		
St. John's																		
Seton Hall																		
Syracuse	20	20	18	13	21	21	19	18	16	16	14	15	14	14	18	14	13	15
Villanova																		

== Regular-season statistical leaders ==
Scoring
Name	School	PPG
Donyell Marshall	Conn	25.1
Lawrence Moten	Syr	21.5
Bill Curley	BC	20.0
Kerry Kittles	Vill	19.7
Artūras Karnišovas	SHU	18.3

Rebounding
Name	School	RPG
Michael Smith	Prov	11.5
Shawnelle Scott	SJU	9.2
John Wallace	Syr	9.0
Bill Curley	BC	9.0
Donyell Marshall	Conn	8.9

Assists
Name	School	APG
Abdul Abdullah	Prov	8.0
Jerry McCullough	Pitt	7.0
Joey Brown	GU	6.5
Kevin Ollie	Conn	6.1
Adrian Autry	Syr	6.1

Steals
Name	School	SPG
Jerry McCullough	Pitt	2.8
Kerry Kittles	Vill	2.7
Doron Sheffer	Conn	2.3
Lawrence Moten	Syr	2.0
Jonathan Haynes	Vill	2.0

Blocks
Name	School	BPG
Donyell Marshall	Conn	3.3
Jason Lawson	Vill	2.8
Eric Mobley	Pitt	2.8
Constantin Popa	Mia	2.2
Eric Williams	Prov	1.8

Field Goals
Name	School	FG%
Eric Mobley	Pitt	.568
John Wallace	Syr	.566
Bill Curley	BC	.557
Shawnelle Scott	SJU	.530
Donyell Marshall	Conn	.512

3-Pt Field Goals
Name	School	3FG%
Howard Eisley	BC	.484
(no other qualifiers)

Free Throws
Name	School	FT%
Artūras Karnišovas	SHU	.833
Bill Curley	BC	.793
Adrian Autry	Syr	.784
Chris Gant	Pitt	.776
Donny Marshall	Conn	.774

== Postseason ==
=== Big East tournament ===
==== Seeding ====
Seeding in the Big East tournament was based on conference record, with tiebreakers applied as necessary. Teams seeded seventh through tenth played a first-round game, and the other six teams received a bye into the quarterfinals.

The tournament's seeding was as follows: (1) Connecticut, (2) Syracuse, (3) Boston College, (4) Providence, (5) Villanova, (6) Georgetown, (7) Seton Hall, (8) Pittsburgh, (9) St. John's, (10) Miami.

==== Bracket ====
First round March 10, 1994
8	Pittsburgh	72
9	St. John's	80
7	Seton Hall	69
10	Miami	51

Quarterfinals; March 11, 1994
1	#2 Connecticut	97
9	St. John's	77
4	Providence	77
5	Villanova	66
3	Boston College	58
6	Georgetown	81
2	#13 Syracuse	80
7	Seton Hall	81^{OT}

Semifinals; March 12, 1994
1	#2 Connecticut	67
4	Providence	69
6	Georgetown	76^{OT}
7	Seton Hall	71

Championship Game; March 13, 1994
4	Providence	74
6	Georgetown	64

=== NCAA tournament ===
Six Big East teams received bids to the NCAA Tournament. Providence and Seton Hall lost in the first round and Georgetown in the second round. Connecticut and Syracuse were defeated in the regional semifinals and Boston College in the regional finals.

School	Region	Seed	Round 1	Round 2	Sweet 16	Elite 8
Boston College	East	9	8 Washington State, W 67–64	1 North Carolina, W 75–72	5 Indiana, W 77–68	3 Florida, L 74–66
Connecticut	East	2	15 Rider, W 64–46	12 George Washington, W 64–59	3 Florida, L 69–60^{(OT)}	
Syracuse	West	4	13 Hawaii, W 92–78	12 UW–Green Bay, W 75–63	1 Missouri, L 98–88^{(OT)}	
Georgetown	Midwest	9	8 Illinois, W 84–77	1 Arkansas, L 85–73		
Providence	Southeast	8	9 Alabama, L 76–70			
Seton Hall	Southeast	10	7 Michigan State, L 84–73			

=== National Invitation Tournament ===
Villanova received the Big East's only bid to the National Invitation Tournament, which did not yet have seeding. The Wildcats won the tournament championship.

School	Round 1	Round 2	Quarterfinals	Semifinals	Final
Villanova	Canisius, W 103–79	Duquesne, W 82–66	Xavier, W 76–74	Kansas State, W 82–76	Vanderbilt, W 80–73

== Awards and honors ==
=== Big East Conference ===
Player of the Year:

- * Donyell Marshall, Connecticut, F, Jr.

Defensive Player of the Year:

- Donyell Marshall, Connecticut, F, Jr.

Rookie of the Year:

- Doron Sheffer, Connecticut, G, Fr.

Coach of the Year:

- Jim Calhoun, Connecticut (8th season)

All-Big East First Team

- Donyell Marshall, Connecticut, F, Jr., 6 ft 9 in (206 cm), 245 lb (111 kg), Reading, Pa.
- Bill Curley, Boston College, F, Sr., 6 ft 9 in (206 cm), 220 lb (100 kg), Boston, Mass.
- Kerry Kittles, Villanova, G, So., 6 ft 5 in (196 cm), 179 lb (81 kg), Dayton, Ohio
- Lawrence Moten, Syracuse, G, Jr., 6 ft 5 in (196 cm), 185 lb (84 kg), Washington, D.C.
- Adrian Autry, Syracuse, G Jr., 6 ft 4 in (193 cm), 207 lb (94 kg), Monroe, N.C.

All-Big East Second Team:

- Michael Smith, Providence, F, Sr., 6 ft 8 in (203 cm), 230 lb (104 kg), Washington, D.C.
- Othella Harrington, Georgetown, C, So., 6 ft 9 in (206 cm), 240 lb (109 kg), Jackson, Miss.
- Artūras Karnišovas, Seton Hall, F, Sr., 6 ft 8 in (203 cm), 227 lb (103 kg), Klaipėda, Lithuania
- John Wallace, Syracuse, F, So., 6 ft 8 in (203 cm), 225 lb (102 kg), Rochester, N.Y.
- Howard Eisley, Boston College, G, Sr., 6 ft 2 in (188 cm), 185 lb (84 kg), Detroit, Mich.

All-Big East Third Team:

- Donny Marshall, Connecticut, F, Jr., 6 ft 7 in (201 cm), 230 lb (104 kg), Detroit, Mich.
- Doron Sheffer, Connecticut, G, Fr., 6 ft 5 in (196 cm), 200 lb (91 kg), Ramat Efal, Israel
- Eric Mobley, Pittsburgh, C, Sr., 6 ft 11 in (211 cm), 235 lb (107 kg), The Bronx, N.Y.
- Shawnelle Scott, St. John's, C, Sr., 6 ft 10 in (208 cm), 250 lb (113 kg), New York, N.Y.
- Jerry McCullough, Pittsburgh, G, Jr., 5 ft 11 in (180 cm), 175 lb (79 kg), New York, N.Y.

Big East All-Rookie Team:

- Danya Abrams, Boston College, F, Fr., 6 ft 7 in (201 cm), 251 lb (114 kg), Westchester, N.Y.
- Doron Sheffer, Connecticut, G, Fr., 6 ft 5 in (196 cm), 200 lb (91 kg), Ramat Efal, Israel
- Ray Allen, Connecticut, G, Fr., 6 ft 5 in (196 cm), 205 lb (93 kg), Merced, Calif.
- Otis Hill, Syracuse, C, Fr., 6 ft 8 in (203 cm), 290 lb (132 kg), White Plains, N.Y.
- Jason Lawson, Villanova, C, Fr., 6 ft 11 in (211 cm), 240 lb (109 kg), Philadelphia, Pa.

=== All-Americans ===
The following players were selected to the 1994 Associated Press All-America teams.

Consensus All-America First Team:

- Donyell Marshall, Connecticut, Key Stats: 25.1 ppg, 8.9 rpg, 1.6 apg, 1.3 spg, 51.2 FG%, 31.1 3P%, 855 points

First Team All-America:

- Donyell Marshall, Connecticut, Key Stats: 25.1 ppg, 8.9 rpg, 1.6 apg, 1.3 spg, 51.2 FG%, 31.1 3P%, 855 points

AP Honorable Mention

- Adrian Autry, Syracuse
- Bill Curley, Boston College
- Lawrence Moten, Syracuse
- Michael Smith, Providence

== See also ==
- 1993–94 NCAA Division I men's basketball season
- 1993–94 Boston College Eagles men's basketball team
- 1993–94 Connecticut Huskies men's basketball team
- 1993–94 Georgetown Hoyas men's basketball team
- 1993–94 Pittsburgh Panthers men's basketball team
- 1993–94 Providence Friars men's basketball team
- 1993–94 St. John's Redmen basketball team
- 1993–94 Seton Hall Pirates men's basketball team
- 1993–94 Syracuse Orangemen basketball team
- 1993–94 Villanova Wildcats men's basketball team
