= 1993–94 Providence Friars men's basketball team =

American college basketball season

1993–94 Providence Friars men's basketball

NCAA tournament, First Round
- Conference: Big East Conference
- Record: 20–10 (10–8 Big East)
- Head coach: Rick Barnes (6th season)
- Home arena: Providence Civic Center

1993–94 Big East men's basketball standings
| | Conf. | | | | Overall |
| Team | W | | L | PCT | W | | L | PCT |
|---|---|---|---|---|---|---|---|---|
| No. 4 Connecticut | 16 | – | 2 | .889 | 29 | – | 5 | .853 |
| No. 15 Syracuse | 13 | – | 5 | .722 | 23 | – | 7 | .767 |
| Boston College | 11 | – | 7 | .611 | 23 | – | 11 | .676 |
| Providence † | 10 | – | 8 | .556 | 20 | – | 10 | .667 |
| Villanova | 10 | – | 8 | .556 | 20 | – | 12 | .625 |
| Georgetown | 10 | – | 8 | .556 | 19 | – | 12 | .613 |
| Seton Hall | 8 | – | 10 | .444 | 17 | – | 13 | .567 |
| Pittsburgh | 7 | – | 11 | .389 | 13 | – | 14 | .481 |
| St. John's | 5 | – | 13 | .278 | 12 | – | 17 | .414 |
| Miami | 0 | – | 18 | .000 | 7 | – | 20 | .259 |
† 1994 Big East tournament winner As of April 4, 1994; Rankings from AP poll

The 1993–94 Providence Friars men's basketball team represented Providence College during the 1993–94 NCAA Division I men's basketball season. Led by head coach Rick Barnes, the Friars finished the season 20–10 (10–8 Big East) but went on a cinderella run to win the Big East Tournament and received an automatic bid to the NCAA tournament as the 8 seed in the Southeast region. The team was beaten in the opening round by No. 9 seed Alabama, 76–70.

== Roster ==
1993–94 Providence Friars men's basketball team
Players
Coaches

| Pos. | # | Name | Height | Weight | Year | Hometown |
|---|---|---|---|---|---|---|
| G | 3 | Jason Murdock | 6 ft 3 in (1.91 m) | 187 lb (85 kg) | Fr | Bridgewater, New Jersey |
| F | 32 | Derrick Brown | 6 ft 6 in (1.98 m) | 210 lb (95 kg) | Fr | Brooklyn, New York |
| F | 34 | Michael Smith | 6 ft 8 in (2.03 m) | 225 lb (102 kg) | Sr | Washington, D.C. |
| F | 42 | Dickey Simpkins | 6 ft 9 in (2.06 m) | 245 lb (111 kg) | Sr | Washington, D.C. |
| PF | 44 | Austin Croshere | 6 ft 10 in (2.08 m) | 225 lb (102 kg) | Fr | Los Angeles, California |
| G/F | 55 | Eric Williams | 6 ft 8 in (2.03 m) | 220 lb (100 kg) | Jr | Newark, New Jersey |

Head coach

- Pete Gillen (Fairfield)

Assistant coach(es)

Legend

- (C) Team captain
- (S) Suspended
- (I) Ineligible
- (W) Walk-on
- Injured
- Current redshirt

Roster

== Schedule and results ==
| Date time, TV | Rank^{#} | Opponent^{#} | Result | Record | Site city, state |
Regular season
| Nov 24, 1993* | | vs. No. 10 Oklahoma State | L 102–113 ^{OT} | 0–1 | Tulsa Convention Center; Tulsa, Oklahoma |
| Nov 27, 1993* | | Brown | W 98–57 | 1–1 | Providence Civic Center; Providence, Rhode Island |
| Dec 1, 1993* | | New Hampshire | W 92–60 | 2–1 | Providence Civic Center; Providence, Rhode Island |
| Dec 4, 1993 | | at Pittsburgh | L 82–94 | 2–2 (0–1) | Fitzgerald Field House; Pittsburgh, Pennsylvania |
| Dec 7, 1993 | | at Villanova | W 66–65 | 3–2 (1–1) | The Pavilion; Philadelphia, Pennsylvania |
| Dec 14, 1993* | | St. Francis (NY) | W 108–48 | 4–2 | Providence Civic Center; Providence, Rhode Island |
| Dec 21, 1993* | | Princeton | W 74–65 | 5–2 | Providence Civic Center; Providence, Rhode Island |
| Dec 31, 1993* | | South Carolina | W 88–69 | 6–2 | Providence Civic Center; Providence, Rhode Island |
| Jan 5, 1994* | | Seton Hall | W 85–61 | 7–2 (2–1) | Providence Civic Center; Providence, Rhode Island |
Big East Tournament
| Mar 11, 1994* | | vs. Villanova; Quarterfinals | W 77–66 | 18–9 | Madison Square Garden; New York, New York |
| Mar 12, 1994* | | vs. No. 2 Connecticut; Semifinals | W 69–67 | 19–9 | Madison Square Garden; New York, New York |
| Mar 13, 1994* | | vs. Georgetown; Championship game | W 74–64 | 20–9 | Madison Square Garden; New York, New York |
NCAA Tournament
| Mar 17, 1994* | (8 SE) | vs. (9 SE) Alabama; First round | L 70–76 | 20–10 | Rupp Arena; Lexington, Kentucky |
*Non-conference game. ^{#}Rankings from AP Poll. (#) Tournament seedings in parentheses. SE=Southeast. All times are in Eastern Time.

== NBA draft ==
| Round | Pick | Player | NBA club |
|---|---|---|---|
| 1 | 21 | Dickey Simpkins | Chicago Bulls |
| 2 | 35 | Michael Smith | Sacramento Kings |
