= 1994 Big East men's basketball tournament =

- Classification: Division I
- Season: 1993–94
- Teams: 10
- Site: Madison Square Garden; New York City
- Champions: Providence (1st title)
- Winning coach: Rick Barnes (1st title)
- MVP: Michael Smith (Providence)

1993–94 Big East men's basketball standings
	Conf.				Overall
Team	W		L	PCT	W		L	PCT
No. 4 Connecticut	16	–	2	.889	29	–	5	.853
No. 15 Syracuse	13	–	5	.722	23	–	7	.767
Boston College	11	–	7	.611	23	–	11	.676
Providence †	10	–	8	.556	20	–	10	.667
Villanova	10	–	8	.556	20	–	12	.625
Georgetown	10	–	8	.556	19	–	12	.613
Seton Hall	8	–	10	.444	17	–	13	.567
Pittsburgh	7	–	11	.389	13	–	14	.481
St. John's	5	–	13	.278	12	–	17	.414
Miami	0	–	18	.000	7	–	20	.259
† 1994 Big East tournament winner As of April 4, 1994; Rankings from AP poll

The 1994 Big East men's basketball tournament took place at Madison Square Garden in New York City, from March 10 to March 13, 1994. Its winner received the Big East Conference's automatic bid to the 1994 NCAA tournament. It was a single-elimination tournament with four rounds. Connecticut finished with the best regular season conference and was awarded the #1 seed.

Providence defeated Georgetown, 74–64, in the championship game to claim its first Big East tournament championship.

== Seeds ==
All 10 Big East schools are scheduled to participate in the tournament. Teams will be seeded by the conference record with tie-breaking procedures to determine the seeds for teams with identical conference records. The top six teams will receive first-round byes. Seeding for the tournament will be determined at the close of the regular conference season.

Seed	School	Conference Record	Tiebreaker
1	Connecticut	16–2	
2	Syracuse	13–5	
3	Boston College	11–7	
4	Providence	10–8	2–0 vs Villanova; 1–1 vs Georgetown
5	Villanova	10–8	2–0 vs Georgetown; 0–2 vs Providence
6	Georgetown	10–8	1–1 vs. Providence; 0–2 vs Villanova
7	Seton Hall	8–10	
8	Pittsburgh	7–11	
9	St. John's	5–13	
10	Miami (FL	0–18	

== Schedule ==
Game	Time	Matchup	Score	Television	Attendance
First round – Thursday, March 10
1	7:00 pm	No. 8 Pittsburgh vs. No. 9 St. John's	72–80	Big East TV Network	19,544
2	9:30 pm	No. 7 Seton Hall vs. No. 10 Miami (FL)	69–51	Big East TV Network	19,544
Quarterfinals – Friday, March 11
3	12 Noon	No. 4 Providence vs. No 5. Villanova	77–66	Big East TV Network	19,544
4	2:30 pm	No. 1 Connecticut vs. No. 9 St. John's	97–77	Big East TV Network	19,544
5	7:00 pm	No. 2 Syracuse vs. No. 7 Seton Hall	80–81^{OT}	Big East TV Network	19,544
6	9:30 pm	No. 3 Boston College vs. No. 6 Georgetown	58–81	Big East TV Network	19,544
Semifinals – Saturday, March 12
7	1:30 pm	No. 1 Connecticut vs. No. 4 Providence	67–79	CBS	19,544
8	3:45 pm	No. 6 Georgetown vs. No. 7 Seton Hall	76–71^{OT}	CBS	19,544
Championship – Sunday, March 13
9	2:45 pm	No. 4 Providence vs. No. 6 Georgetown	74–64	CBS	19,544
Game times in Eastern Time. Rankings denote tournament seed.

== Bracket ==
First round March 10, 1994
8	Pittsburgh	72
9	St. John's	80
7	Seton Hall	69
10	Miami	51

Quarterfinals; March 11, 1994
1	#2 Connecticut	97
9	St. John's	77
4	Providence	77
5	Villanova	66
3	Boston College	58
6	Georgetown	81
2	#13 Syracuse	80
7	Seton Hall	81^{OT}

Semifinals; March 12, 1994
1	#2 Connecticut	67
4	Providence	69
6	Georgetown	76^{OT}
7	Seton Hall	71

Championship Game; March 13, 1994
4	Providence	74
6	Georgetown	64

== Awards ==
Dave Gavitt Trophy (Most Valuable Player): Michael Smith, Providence

All Tournament Team

- George Butler, Georgetown
- Othella Harrington, Georgetown
- Donyell Marshall, Connecticut
- Rob Phelps, Providence
- Dickey Simpkins, Providence
- Michael Smith, Providence
