= Dan Cross =

American basketball player (born 1973)

Personal information
- Born: August 16, 1973 (age 53) Chicago, Illinois, U.S.
- Listed height: 6 ft 3 in (1.91 m)
- Listed weight: 193 lb (88 kg)

Career information
- High school: Carbondale Community (Carbondale, Illinois)
- College: Florida (1991–1995)
- NBA draft: 1995: undrafted
- Playing career: 1995–2006
- Position: Guard
- Number: 12

Career history
- 1997: Serapide Pozzuoli
- 1997: Sioux Falls Skyforce
- 1997–1998: Connecticut Pride
- 1998–1999: Papagou
- 2000–2001: Connecticut Pride
- 2001: Lakeland Blue Ducks
- 2001–2002: Progresso Castel Maggiore
- 2003: Honka Espoo
- 2004–2005: Keravnos Strovolou
- 2005–2006: Hapoel Tel Aviv

Career highlights
- 2× Honorable mention All-American (1994, 1995); 2× First-team All-SEC (1994, 1995)

Daniel Curtis Cross Jr. (born August 16, 1973) is an American former basketball player. Cross played college basketball for the Florida Gators men's basketball team of the University of Florida, where he was key member of the Gators' run to the 1994 NCAA Final Four. After college, Cross played professionally in several countries, including a stint in Italy's Serie A.

Cross was born in Chicago, Illinois, and grew up in Carbondale, Illinois. He is the oldest of the five children of Daniel Cross Sr. and Lillian Cross. He attended Carbondale Community High School, where he played for the Carbondale Terriers high school basketball team, and led the Terriers to the state championship game.

Cross accepted an athletic scholarship to attend the University of Florida in Gainesville, Florida, where he played for coach Lon Kruger's Florida Gators men's basketball team from 1991 to 1995. Cross shared time with upperclassmen at the point guard position during his freshman and sophomore seasons, starting 20 games in 1991–92, and twelve of the last fourteen in 1992–93; he became a consistent starter at the outset of his 1993–94 junior year. Memorably, he led the team with 20 points in their 59–57 upset of the No. 7 Kentucky Wildcats, and he scored 24 points (including six 3-pointers) in the Gators' 88–64 victory over the South Carolina Gamecocks in 1994. Cross was a key performer and team leader, emotionally and statistically, in the Gators' run to their first-ever NCAA Final Four in 1994. In the 1994 NCAA Tournament first-round game, Cross drove the lane to make a high-arcing layup with seven seconds left to defeat the James Madison Dukes 64–62, so that the Gators could advance. Paced by Cross, center Andrew DeClercq, and fellow guard Craig Brown, the Gators then dispatched the Penn Quakers (70–58), the Connecticut Huskies (69–60, OT), and the Boston College Eagles (74–68), before falling to the Duke Blue Devils 70–65 in the hard-fought NCAA national semifinal game.

Cross had a 27-point scoring performance while leading the Gators' 81–70 victory over the No. 21 Wake Forest Demon Deacons at the outset of the 1994–95 season. He was the Gators' leading scorer in 1993–94 (15.7 points per game) and again in 1994–95 (18.0 points per game), and led the Southeastern Conference (SEC) in free throw completion percentage in 1995 (.843, 150–178). He was a two-time first-team All-SEC selection (1994, 1995), received Associated Press honorable mention All-American honors twice (1994, 1995), and was a senior team captain (1995).

Cross returned to the University of Florida to complete his bachelor's degree in telecommunications in 2000, and was inducted into the University of Florida Athletic Hall of Fame as a "Gator Great" in 2006. In 2008, he was honored as one of the "Legends of SEC Basketball."

After concluding his college career, Cross played professionally for several top-tier teams in Europe and developmental leagues in the United States, including Serapide Pozzuoli of Italy's Lega Basket Serie A, the Sioux Falls Skyforce and Connecticut Pride of the Continental Basketball Association (CBA), Espoon Honka of Finland's Korisliiga, and Hapoel Tel Aviv in Israel.

Cross now runs annual basketball camps in Carbondale, Gainesville and Orlando, as well as managing an organization called "Athlete Connections" that counsels former college athletes on transitioning from college to life after sports.

== See also ==
- Florida Gators
- List of University of Florida alumni
- List of University of Florida Athletic Hall of Fame members
