= 1994 Northeast Conference men's basketball tournament =

- Classification: Division I
- Season: 1993–94
- Teams: 10
- Finals site: Alumni Gymnasium; Lawrenceville, NJ
- Champions: Rider (2nd title)
- Winning coach: Kevin Bannon (2nd title)
- MVP: Charles Smith (RU)

The 1994 Northeast Conference men's basketball tournament was played February 28–March 3, 1994. The tournament featured the league's ten teams, seeded based on their conference record. Rider won the championship, their second consecutive, and received the conference's automatic bid to the 1994 NCAA Tournament.

1993–94 Northeast Conference men's basketball standings
	Conf.				Overall
Team	W		L	PCT	W		L	PCT
Rider †	14	–	4	.778	21	–	9	.700
Monmouth	13	–	5	.722	18	–	11	.621
Robert Morris	11	–	7	.611	14	–	14	.500
Wagner	11	–	7	.611	16	–	12	.571
Fairleigh Dickinson	10	–	8	.556	14	–	13	.519
Marist	10	–	8	.556	14	–	13	.519
Mount St. Mary's	9	–	9	.500	13	–	15	.464
Saint Francis (PA)	9	–	9	.500	13	–	15	.464
Long Island	2	–	16	.111	3	–	24	.111
St. Francis Brooklyn	1	–	17	.056	1	–	26	.037
† 1994 NEC tournament winner

== Format ==
The NEC Men's Basketball Tournament consisted of a ten-team playoff format with all games played at the venue of the higher seed. The first round was played by the four lowest seeds (7–10) and the other teams received a bye.

== Bracket ==
First round Monday, February 28, 1994
8	Saint Francis (PA)	103
9	Long Island	79
7	Mount St. Mary's	90
10	St. Francis Brooklyn	81

Quarterfinals; Tuesday, March 1, 1994
1	Rider	74
8	Saint Francis (PA)	60
4	Wagner	90
5	Fairleigh Dickinson	81
2	Monmouth	88
10	Mount St. Mary's	77^{OT}
3	Robert Morris	71
6	Marist	52

Semifinals; Wednesday, March 2, 1994
1	Rider	83
4	Wagner	75
2	Monmouth	76
3	Robert Morris	61

Championship Game; Thursday, March 3, 1994
1	Rider	62
2	Monmouth	56

== All-tournament team ==
Tournament MVP in bold.

**1994 NEC All-Tournament Team**

**Charles Smith**, RU
Tim Pennix, RU
Glenn Stokes, MU
Bobby Hopson, WC
Deon Hames, RU
John Giraldo, MU
