= 1993–94 St. John's Redmen basketball team =

American college basketball season

1993–1994 St. John's Redmen men's basketball

Lapchick Memorial Champions
- Conference: Big East Conference (1979–2013)
- Record: 12–17 (5–13 Big East)
- Head coach: Brian Mahoney
- Assistant coaches: Al LoBalbo; Ron Rutledge; George Felton
- Home arena: Alumni Hall; Madison Square Garden

1993–94 Big East men's basketball standings
	Conf.				Overall
Team	W		L	PCT	W		L	PCT
No. 4 Connecticut	16	–	2	.889	29	–	5	.853
No. 15 Syracuse	13	–	5	.722	23	–	7	.767
Boston College	11	–	7	.611	23	–	11	.676
Providence †	10	–	8	.556	20	–	10	.667
Villanova	10	–	8	.556	20	–	12	.625
Georgetown	10	–	8	.556	19	–	12	.613
Seton Hall	8	–	10	.444	17	–	13	.567
Pittsburgh	7	–	11	.389	13	–	14	.481
St. John's	5	–	13	.278	12	–	17	.414
Miami	0	–	18	.000	7	–	20	.259
† 1994 Big East tournament winner As of April 4, 1994; Rankings from AP poll

The 1993–94 St. John's Redmen basketball team represented St. John's University during the 1993–94 NCAA Division I men's basketball season. The team was coached by Brian Mahoney in his second year at the school. This was the Redmen's first losing season in 31 years, as well as its final season as the Redmen, before becoming the Red Storm the following season. St. John's home games are played at Alumni Hall and Madison Square Garden and the team is a member of the Big East Conference.

== Off season ==
=== Departures ===
Name	Number	Pos.	Height	Weight	Year	Hometown	Notes
David Cain	11	G	6'0"		Senior		Graduated
Mitchell Foster	15	F	6'9"		Senior		Graduated
Lamont Middleton	31	F	6'6"		RS Senior		Graduated

=== Class of 1993 signees ===
College recruiting information
Name	Hometown	School	Height	Weight	Commit date
Roshown McLeod; PF	Jersey City, NJ	St. Anthony High School	6 ft 8 in (2.03 m)	N/A	
Roshown McLeod; PF	Recruit ratings: No ratings found				
James Scott; SF	Paterson, NJ	Eastside High School/Spartanburg Methodist	6 ft 6 in (1.98 m)	N/A	
James Scott; SF	Recruit ratings: No ratings found				
Overall recruit ranking:
Note: In many cases, Scout, Rivals, 247Sports, On3, and ESPN may conflict in their listings of height and weight.; In these cases, the average was taken. ESPN grades are on a 100-point scale.; Sources: "1993 Team Ranking". Rivals.

== Roster ==
1993–94 St. John's Red Storm men's basketball team
Players
Coaches

Pos.	#	Name	Height	Weight	Year	Previous school	Hometown
F	3	Sergio Luyk	6 ft 7 in (2.01 m)	—	RS Jr	University Heights (KY)	Madrid, Spain
G	5	Maurice Brown	5 ft 9 in (1.75 m)	—	So	William E. Grady (NY)	Brooklyn, NY
G	13	Lee Green	6 ft 2 in (1.88 m)	—	Sr	Cheshire (CT)	New York, NY
F	22	Thomas Bayne	6 ft 10 in (2.08 m)	—	So	Brentwood (NY)	Brentwood, NY
G	23	Derek Brown	6 ft 3 in (1.91 m)	—	Jr	H. Frank Carey (NY)	Franklin Square, NY
G	24	Rowan Barrett	6 ft 5 in (1.96 m)	—	So	West Hill	Scarborough, Ontario
G	30	Carl Beckett	6 ft 4 in (1.93 m)	—	RS Sr	Christ the King (NY)	Queens, NY
G/F	32	James Scott	6 ft 6 in (1.98 m)	—	Jr	Spartanburg Methodist	Paterson, NJ
F	33	Roshown McLeod	6 ft 8 in (2.03 m)	—	Fr	St. Anthony's (NJ)	Jersey City, NJ
F	34	Charles Minlend	6 ft 6 in (1.98 m)	—	So	St. Thomas More (CT)	Cameroon, Africa
C	42	Shawnelle Scott	6 ft 10 in (2.08 m)	—	Sr	All Hallows (NY)	Bronx, NY
G/F	44	Fred Lyson	6 ft 7 in (2.01 m)	—	So	Oceanside (NY)	Oceanside, NY
G		Brad Small (W)	5 ft 9 in (1.75 m)	—	Sr
		Billy Mitaritonna (W)	—	—	Jr

Head coach

- Brian Mahoney (Manhattan)

Assistant coach(es)

- Al LoBalbo
- Ron Rutledge
- George Felton

Legend

- (C) Team captain
- (S) Suspended
- (I) Ineligible
- (W) Walk-on
- Injured
- Current redshirt

== Schedule and results ==
Date time, TV	Rank^{#}	Opponent^{#}	Result	Record	Site city, state
Regular season
11/17/93*		Towson State; Preseason NIT First Round	L 65-66	0-1	Alumni Hall; Queens, NY
11/30/93*		Columbia	W 79-49	1-1	Alumni Hall; Queens, NY
12/04/93		Seton Hall	W 72-64	2-1 (1-0)	Madison Square Garden; New York, NY
12/07/93		Pittsburgh	L 68-75	2-2 (1-1)	Alumni Hall; Queens, NY
12/11/93*		Colgate; Lapchick Tournament Opening Round	W 92-79	3-2	Alumni Hall; Queens, NY
12/12/93*		Hofstra; Lapchick Tournament Championship	W 70-42	4-2	Alumni Hall; Queens, NY
12/18/93*		vs. Fordham	W 98-72	5-2	Nassau Coliseum; Uniondale, NY
12/22/93*		Niagara	W 89-66	6-2	Alumni Hall; Queens, NY
12/27/93*		Fairleigh Dickinson; ECAC Holiday Festival Semifinal	W 83-59	7-2	Madison Square Garden; New York, NY
12/29/93*		No. 15 Georgia Tech; ECAC Holiday Festival Championship	L 69-71	7-3	Madison Square Garden; New York, NY
01/08/94		Villanova	L 68-69	7-4 (1-2)	Alumni Hall; Queens, NY
01/12/94		at Georgetown	L 49-60	7-5 (1-3)	USAir Arena; Landover, MD
01/15/94		No. 14 Connecticut	L 81-85	7-6 (1-4)	Madison Square Garden; New York, NY
01/18/94		at No. 16 Syracuse	L 82-92	7-7 (1-5)	Carrier Dome; Syracuse, NY
01/22/94		at Miami (F.L.)	W 75-63	8-7 (2-5)	Miami Arena; Miami, FL
01/26/94		Boston College	L 68-85	8-8 (2-6)	Madison Square Garden; New York, NY
01/30/94*		No. 17 Minnesota	L 64-92	8-9	Madison Square Garden; New York, NY
02/02/94		at Villanova	L 56-59	8-10 (2-7)	duPont Pavilion; Villanova, PA
02/05/94		Providence	W 73-69	9-10 (3-7)	Alumni Hall; Queens, NY
02/08/94		Miami (F.L.)	W 78-63	10-10 (4-7)	Alumni Hall; Queens, NY
02/12/94		at Pittsburgh	W 68-62	11-10 (5-7)	Fitzgerald Field House; Pittsburgh, PA
02/14/94		at Seton Hall	L 57-67	11-11 (5-8)	Brendan Byrne Arena; East Rutherford, NJ
02/19/94		Georgetown	L 61-74	11-12 (5-9)	Madison Square Garden; New York, NY
02/21/94		Providence	L 67-75	11-13 (5-10)	Providence Civic Center; Providence, RI
02/27/94		No. 18 Syracuse	L 81-82	11-14 (5-11)	Madison Square Garden; New York, NY
03/01/94		at No. 23 Boston College	L 76-95	11-15 (5-12)	Silvio O. Conte Forum; Chestnut Hill, MA
03/05/94		at No. 4 Connecticut	L 80-95	11-16 (5-13)	Hartford Civic Center; Hartford, CT
Big East tournament
03/10/94		vs. Pittsburgh; Big East tournament first round	W 80-72	12-16 (5-13)	Madison Square Garden; New York, NY
03/11/94		vs. No. 2 Connecticut; Big East tournament Quarterfinal	L 77-97	12-17 (5-13)	Madison Square Garden; New York, NY
*Non-conference game. ^{#}Rankings from AP Poll. (#) Tournament seedings in parentheses.

== Team players drafted into the NBA ==
Round	Pick	Player	NBA club
2	43	Shawnelle Scott	Portland Trail Blazers
