= 1993–94 Seton Hall Pirates men's basketball team =

American college basketball season

1993–94 Seton Hall Pirates men's basketball

NCAA tournament, first round
- Conference: Big East Conference
- Record: 17–13 (8–10 Big East)
- Head coach: P. J. Carlesimo (12th season)
- Home arena: Brendan Byrne Arena

1993–94 Big East men's basketball standings
	Conf.				Overall
Team	W		L	PCT	W		L	PCT
No. 4 Connecticut	16	–	2	.889	29	–	5	.853
No. 15 Syracuse	13	–	5	.722	23	–	7	.767
Boston College	11	–	7	.611	23	–	11	.676
Providence †	10	–	8	.556	20	–	10	.667
Villanova	10	–	8	.556	20	–	12	.625
Georgetown	10	–	8	.556	19	–	12	.613
Seton Hall	8	–	10	.444	17	–	13	.567
Pittsburgh	7	–	11	.389	13	–	14	.481
St. John's	5	–	13	.278	12	–	17	.414
Miami	0	–	18	.000	7	–	20	.259
† 1994 Big East tournament winner As of April 4, 1994; Rankings from AP poll

The 1993–94 Seton Hall Pirates men's basketball team represented Seton Hall University during the 1993–94 NCAA men's college basketball season. The Pirates were led by 12th-year head coach P.J. Carlesimo, serving in his final season at the school.

The Pirates finished 7th during the Big East regular season, lost in the semifinals of the Big East tournament, and received an at-large bid to the NCAA tournament as #10 seed in the Southeast region. In the first round of the tournament Seton Hall were defeated by Michigan State 84–73.

== Roster ==
1992–93 Seton Hall Pirates men's basketball team
Players
Coaches

Pos.	#	Name	Height	Weight	Year	Previous school	Hometown
G/F	4	Adrian Griffin	6 ft 5 in (1.96 m)	210 lb (95 kg)	So	Wichita East HS	Wichita, Kansas
G	15	Dan Hurley	6 ft 2 in (1.88 m)	—	Jr	St. Anthony HS	Jersey City, New Jersey
F	55	Artūras Karnišovas	6 ft 8 in (2.03 m)	220 lb (100 kg)	Sr

Head coach

- P. J. Carlesimo

Assistant coach(es)

Legend

- (C) Team captain
- (S) Suspended
- (I) Ineligible
- (W) Walk-on
- Injured
- Current redshirt

Roster

== Schedule and results ==
Date time, TV	Rank^{#}	Opponent^{#}	Result	Record	Site (attendance) city, state
Regular season
Nov 29, 1993*		Saint Peter's	W 59–46	1–0	Brendan Byrne Arena; East Rutherford, New Jersey
Dec 4, 1993		at St. John's	L 64–72	1–1 (0–1)	Madison Square Garden; New York, New York
Dec 8, 1993		No. 21 Connecticut	L 66–82	1–2 (0–2)	Brendan Byrne Arena; East Rutherford, New Jersey
Dec 11, 1993*		St. Bonaventure	W 76–62	2–2	Brendan Byrne Arena; East Rutherford, New Jersey
Dec 14, 1993*		Iona	W 81–56	3–2	Brendan Byrne Arena; East Rutherford, New Jersey
Dec 22, 1993*		Texas A&M	W 62–55	4–2	Brendan Byrne Arena; East Rutherford, New Jersey
Dec 24, 1993*		at Wagner	W 74–62	5–2	Sutter Gymnasium; Staten Island, New York
Dec 29, 1993*		San Diego	W 67–47	6–2	Brendan Byrne Arena; East Rutherford, New Jersey
Dec 30, 1993*		Stanford	W 75–69	7–2	Brendan Byrne Arena; East Rutherford, New Jersey
Jan 5, 1994		at Providence	L 61–85	7–3 (0–3)	Providence Civic Center; Providence, Rhode Island
Jan 9, 1994*		at No. 10 Purdue	L 67–69	7–4	Mackey Arena; West Lafayette, Indiana
Jan 12, 1994		No. 20 Boston College	W 61–53	8–4 (1–3)	Brendan Byrne Arena; East Rutherford, New Jersey
Jan 15, 1994		at Pittsburgh	W 76–67	9–4 (2–3)	Fitzgerald Field House; Pittsburgh, Pennsylvania
Jan 17, 1994		Georgetown	L 53–57	9–5 (2–4)	Brendan Byrne Arena; East Rutherford, New Jersey
Jan 22, 1994		No. 16 Syracuse	L 74–78	9–6 (2–5)	Brendan Byrne Arena; East Rutherford, New Jersey
Jan 26, 1994		at Miami (FL)	W 77–48	10–6 (3–5)	Miami Arena; Miami, Florida
Jan 29, 1994		at Boston College	L 58–70	10–7 (3–6)	Silvio O. Conte Forum; Chestnut Hill, Massachusetts
Jan 31, 1994		Providence	W 64–63 ^{OT}	11–7 (4–6)	Brendan Byrne Arena; East Rutherford, New Jersey
Mar 5, 1994		Pittsburgh	W 80–54	15–11 (8–10)	Brendan Byrne Arena; East Rutherford, New Jersey
Big East tournament
Mar 10, 1994*		vs. Miami (FL); First round	W 69–51	16–11	Madison Square Garden; New York, New York
Mar 11, 1994*		vs. No. 13 Syracuse; Quarterfinals	W 81–80 ^{OT}	17–11	Madison Square Garden; New York, New York
Mar 12, 1994*		vs. Georgetown; Semifinals	L 71–76 ^{OT}	17–12	Madison Square Garden; New York, New York
NCAA Tournament
Mar 18, 1994*	(10 S)	vs. (7 S) Michigan State; First round	L 73–84	17–13	Tropicana Field; St. Petersburg, Florida
*Non-conference game. ^{#}Rankings from AP Poll. (#) Tournament seedings in parentheses. SE=Southeast.
