= 1993–94 Boston College Eagles men's basketball team =

American college basketball season

1993–94 Boston College Eagles men's basketball

NCAA tournament, Elite Eight
- Conference: Big East Conference

Ranking
- Coaches: No. 11
- Record: 23–11 (11–7 Big East)
- Head coach: Jim O'Brien (8th season)
- Home arena: Silvio O. Conte Forum

1993–94 Big East men's basketball standings
	Conf.				Overall
Team	W		L	PCT	W		L	PCT
No. 4 Connecticut	16	–	2	.889	29	–	5	.853
No. 15 Syracuse	13	–	5	.722	23	–	7	.767
Boston College	11	–	7	.611	23	–	11	.676
Providence †	10	–	8	.556	20	–	10	.667
Villanova	10	–	8	.556	20	–	12	.625
Georgetown	10	–	8	.556	19	–	12	.613
Seton Hall	8	–	10	.444	17	–	13	.567
Pittsburgh	7	–	11	.389	13	–	14	.481
St. John's	5	–	13	.278	12	–	17	.414
Miami	0	–	18	.000	7	–	20	.259
† 1994 Big East tournament winner As of April 4, 1994; Rankings from AP poll

The 1993–94 Boston College Eagles men's basketball team represented Boston College as members of the Big East Conference during the 1993–94 NCAA Division I men's basketball season. The team was led by 8th-year head coach Jim O'Brien and played their home games at the Silvio O. Conte Forum in Boston, Massachusetts.

After finishing third in the Big East regular season standings, the Eagles were bounced in the quarterfinal round of the Big East tournament. The early exit in the conference tournament didn't linger, as BC received an at-large bid to the NCAA tournament as No. 9 seed in the East region and made a run to the Elite Eight.

== Roster ==
1993–94 Boston College Eagles men's basketball team
Players
Coaches

Pos.	#	Name	Height	Weight	Year	Hometown
G	10	Howard Eisley	6 ft 2 in (1.88 m)	180 lb (82 kg)	Sr	Detroit, Michigan
G	12	Malcolm Huckaby	6 ft 4 in (1.93 m)	218 lb (99 kg)	Sr	Bristol, Connecticut
F	15	Bill Curley	6 ft 9 in (2.06 m)	220 lb (100 kg)	Sr	Duxbury, Massachusetts
F	24	Danya Abrams	6 ft 7 in (2.01 m)	230 lb (104 kg)	Fr	Westchester, New York
C	40	Paul Grant	7 ft 0 in (2.13 m)	245 lb (111 kg)	So	Birmingham, Michigan

Head coach

- Jim O'Brien (Boston College)

Assistant coach(es)

Legend

- (C) Team captain
- (S) Suspended
- (I) Ineligible
- (W) Walk-on
- Injured
- Current redshirt

Roster

== Schedule and results ==
Date time, TV	Rank^{#}	Opponent^{#}	Result	Record	Site (attendance) city, state
Regular season
Nov 27, 1993*		Hartford	W 90–65	1–0	Silvio O. Conte Forum; Boston, Massachusetts
Nov 30, 1993*		Dartmouth	W 94–73	2–0	Silvio O. Conte Forum; Boston, Massachusetts
Dec 2, 1993*		Notre Dame	W 87–79	3–0	Silvio O. Conte Forum; Boston, Massachusetts
Dec 5, 1993*		vs. Arizona State	W 78–74	4–0	America West Arena; Phoenix, Arizona
Dec 9, 1993		at No. 13 Syracuse	W 75–58	5–0 (1–0)	Carrier Dome; Syracuse, New York
Dec 11, 1993*		at Buffalo	W 64–51	6–0	Alumni Arena; Buffalo, New York
Dec 21, 1993	No. 18	at Chaminade; Maui Invitational Tournament	W 108–61	7–0	Lahaina Civic Center; Lahaina, Hawaii
Dec 22, 1993*	No. 18	vs. No. 13 Arizona; Maui Invitational Tournament	L 65–70	7–1	Lahaina Civic Center; Lahaina, Hawaii
Dec 23, 1993*	No. 18	vs. Ohio State; Maui Invitational Tournament	L 67–69	7–2	Lahaina Civic Center; Lahaina, Hawaii
Dec 30, 1993*	No. 23	Long Island University	W 85–54	8–2	Silvio O. Conte Forum; Boston, Massachusetts
Jan 2, 1994*	No. 23	Coppin State	W 90–64	9–2	Silvio O. Conte Forum; Boston, Massachusetts
Jan 4, 1994	No. 20	Villanova	W 96–84	10–2 (2–0)	Silvio O. Conte Forum; Boston, Massachusetts
Jan 8, 1994	No. 20	at No. 16 Connecticut	L 71–77	10–3 (2–1)	Harry A. Gampel Pavilion; Storrs, Connecticut
Jan 12, 1994	No. 20	at Seton Hall	L 53–61	10–4 (2–2)	Brendan Byrne Arena; East Rutherford, New Jersey
Jan 15, 1994	No. 20	Miami (FL)	W 69–49	11–4 (3–2)	Silvio O. Conte Forum; Boston, Massachusetts
Jan 18, 1994		Pittsburgh	L 75–77	11–5 (3–3)	Silvio O. Conte Forum; Boston, Massachusetts
Jan 20, 1994*		Holy Cross	W 107–72	12–5	Silvio O. Conte Forum; Boston, Massachusetts
Jan 22, 1994		Providence	W 58–54	13–5 (4–3)	Silvio O. Conte Forum; Boston, Massachusetts
Jan 26, 1994		at St. John's	W 85–68	14–5 (5–3)	Madison Square Garden; New York, New York
Jan 29, 1994		Seton Hall	W 70–58	15–5 (6–3)	Silvio O. Conte Forum; Boston, Massachusetts
Jan 31, 1994		Georgetown	W 71–64	16–5 (7–3)	Silvio O. Conte Forum; Boston, Massachusetts
Feb 5, 1994		at Villanova	L 86–92 ^{OT}	16–6 (7–4)	The Pavilion; Philadelphia, Pennsylvania
Feb 9, 1994		No. 6 Connecticut	L 91–94 ^{OT}	16–7 (7–5)	Silvio O. Conte Forum; Boston, Massachusetts
Feb 16, 1994		at Miami (FL)	W 79–63	17–7 (8–5)	Miami Arena; Miami, Florida
Feb 19, 1994		No. 14 Syracuse	W 89–83	18–7 (9–5)	Silvio O. Conte Forum; Boston, Massachusetts
Feb 22, 1994	No. 21	at Pittsburgh	W 80–77	19–7 (10–5)	Fitzgerald Field House; Pittsburgh, Pennsylvania
Feb 26, 1994	No. 21	at Georgetown	L 68–78	19–8 (10–6)	USAir Arena; Washington, D.C.
Mar 1, 1994	No. 23	St. John's	W 95–76	20–8 (11–6)	Silvio O. Conte Forum; Boston, Massachusetts
Mar 5, 1994	No. 23	at Providence	L 69–77	20–9 (11–7)	Providence Civic Center; Providence, Rhode Island
Big East tournament
Mar 11, 1994*	(3)	vs. (6) Georgetown; Quarterfinals	L 58–81	20–10	Madison Square Garden; New York, New York
NCAA Tournament
Mar 18, 1994*	(9 E)	vs. (8 E) Washington State; First Round	W 67–64	21–10	USAir Arena; Washington, D.C.
Mar 20, 1994*	(9 E)	vs. (1 E) No. 1 North Carolina; Second Round	W 75–72	22–10	USAir Arena; Washington, D.C.
Mar 25, 1994*	(9 E)	vs. (5 E) No. 18 Indiana; Sweet Sixteen	W 77–68	23–10	Miami Arena; Miami, Florida
Mar 27, 1994*	(9 E)	vs. (3 E) No. 14 Florida; Elite Eight	L 66–74	23–11	Miami Arena; Miami, Florida
*Non-conference game. ^{#}Rankings from AP Poll. (#) Tournament seedings in parentheses.

== NBA draft ==
Round	Pick	Player	NBA Team
1	22	Bill Curley	San Antonio Spurs
2	30	Howard Eisley	Minnesota Timberwolves
