= 1993–94 Villanova Wildcats men's basketball team =

American college basketball season

1993–94 Villanova Wildcats men's basketball

NIT champions
- Conference: Big East Conference
- Record: 20–12 (10–8 Big East)
- Head coach: Steve Lappas (2nd season)
- Home arena: John Eleuthère du Pont Pavilion (Capacity: 6,500)

1993–94 Big East men's basketball standings
	Conf.				Overall
Team	W		L	PCT	W		L	PCT
No. 4 Connecticut	16	–	2	.889	29	–	5	.853
No. 15 Syracuse	13	–	5	.722	23	–	7	.767
Boston College	11	–	7	.611	23	–	11	.676
Providence †	10	–	8	.556	20	–	10	.667
Villanova	10	–	8	.556	20	–	12	.625
Georgetown	10	–	8	.556	19	–	12	.613
Seton Hall	8	–	10	.444	17	–	13	.567
Pittsburgh	7	–	11	.389	13	–	14	.481
St. John's	5	–	13	.278	12	–	17	.414
Miami	0	–	18	.000	7	–	20	.259
† 1994 Big East tournament winner As of April 4, 1994; Rankings from AP poll

The 1993–94 Villanova Wildcats men's basketball team represented Villanova University in the 1993–94 season. The head coach was Steve Lappas. The team played its home games at The Pavilion in Villanova, Pennsylvania, and was a member of the Big East Conference.

== Roster ==
1993–94 Villanova Wildcats men's basketball team
Players
Coaches

Pos.	#	Name	Height	Weight	Year	Hometown
G	12	Kevin Cox	6 ft 3 in (1.91 m)	—	Jr
G	5	Ray Dietz	6 ft 4 in (1.93 m)	—	Sr
F		Eric Eberz	6 ft 7 in (2.01 m)	—	So
F		Jaime Gregg	6 ft 8 in (2.03 m)	—	So
G	4	Roscoe Harris	6 ft 4 in (1.93 m)	—	So
G	21	Jonathan Haynes	6 ft 3 in (1.91 m)	—	Jr
G	30	Kerry Kittles	6 ft 5 in (1.96 m)	—	So
C		Jason Lawson	6 ft 11 in (2.11 m)	—	Fr
F	33	Zeffy Penn	—	—	Fr
C	22	Art Quarterman	6 ft 8 in (2.03 m)	—	Fr
	3	J Singleton	—	—
G	20	Alvin Williams	6 ft 5 in (1.96 m)	—	Fr
F	13	Ron Wilson	6 ft 9 in (2.06 m)	—	Jr

Head coach

- Steve Lappas (CCNY)

Assistant coach(es)

Legend

- (C) Team captain
- (S) Suspended
- (I) Ineligible
- (W) Walk-on
- Injured
- Current redshirt

== Schedule ==
Date time, TV	Rank^{#}	Opponent^{#}	Result	Record	Site city, state
Non-conference regular season
December 1, 1993*; 7:30 pm		American	W 94–62	1–0	John Eleuthère du Pont Pavilion (5,521); Villanova, Pennsylvania
Big East Conference Regular Season
December 4, 1993; 2:00 pm, Big East TV		at No. 25 Georgetown	W 76–75	2–0 (1–0)	Capital Centre (10,308); Landover, Maryland
December 7, 1993; 8:00 pm, Big East TV		Providence	L 65–66	2–1 (1–1)	John Eleuthère du Pont Pavilion (6,500); Villanova, Pennsylvania
Non-conference regular season
December 11, 1993*; 2:00 pm, Prism		vs. No. 5 Temple; Big 5	L 49–54	2–2	The Spectrum (14,573); Philadelphia, Pennsylvania
December 18, 1993*; 2:00 pm		St. Mary's	W 89–78	3–2	John Eleuthère du Pont Pavilion (4,564); Villanova, Pennsylvania
December 22, 1993*; 7:30 pm		Florida	L 77–85	3–3	John Eleuthère du Pont Pavilion (6,500); Villanova, Pennsylvania
December 28, 1993*; 8:00 pm		vs. Ole Miss; Arizona State Tribune Classic Semifinals	W 90–82	4–3	ASU Activity Center (6,057); Tempe, Arizona
December 29, 1993*; 10:30 pm		at Arizona State; Arizona State Tribune Classic Championship	L 62–73	4–4	ASU Activity Center (6,472); Tempe, AZ
Big East Conference Regular Season
January 4, 1994; 8:00 pm		at No. 20 Boston College	L 84–96	4–5 (1–2)	Conte Forum (6,924); Chestnut Hill, Massachusetts
January 8, 1994; 1:00 pm, Big East TV		at St. John's	W 69–68	5–5 (2–2)	Alumni Hall (6,008); Jamaica, New York
Non-conference regular season
January 11, 1994*; 7:30 pm		at Richmond	W 81–80	6–5	Robins Center (6,809); Richmond, Virginia
Big East Conference Regular Season
January 15, 1994; 8:00 pm		No. 16 Syracuse	L 85–88	6–6 (2–3)	The Spectrum (10,003); Philadelphia, Pennsylvania
January 22, 1994; 8:00 pm		Pittsburgh	L 70–81	6–7 (2–4)	John Eleuthère du Pont Pavilion (6,500); Villanova, Pennsylvania
January 25, 1994; 8:00 pm		at No. 6 Connecticut	L 67–91	6–8 (2–5)	Harry A. Gampel Pavilion (6,294); Storrs, Connecticut
January 29, 1994; 8:00 pm, Big East TV		at No. 14 Syracuse	L 68–87	6–9 (2–6)	Carrier Dome (26,686); Syracuse, New York
February 2, 1994; 9:00 pm, ESPN		St. John's	W 59–56	7–9 (3–6)	John Eleuthère du Pont Pavilion (6,500); Villanova, Pennsylvania
February 5, 1994; 8:00 pm, Big East TV		Boston College	W 92–86	8–9 (4–6)	John Eleuthère du Pont Pavilion (6,500); Villanova, Pennsylvania
February 8, 1994; 8:00 pm, Big East TV		at Seton Hall	W 65–60	9–9 (5–6)	Brendan Byrne Arena (12,612); East Rutherford, New Jersey
February 12, 1994; 7:30 pm		at Miami (FL)	W 77–58	10–9 (6–6)	Miami Arena (2,011); Miami, Florida
February 15, 1994; 8:00 pm, Big East TV		No. 3 Connecticut	W 64–63	11–9 (7–6)	John Eleuthère du Pont Pavilion (6,500); Villanova, Pennsylvania
February 19, 1994; 1:00 pm, Big East TV		at Pittsburgh	W 93–88	12–9 (8–6)	Fitzgerald Field House (5,894); Pittsburgh, Pennsylvania
February 22, 1994; 8:00 pm		Georgetown	W 70–64	13–9 (9–6)	The Spectrum (10,043); Philadelphia, Pennsylvania
February 26, 1994; 1:00 pm, Big East TV		Seton Hall	L 59–70	13–10 (9–7)	John Eleuthère du Pont Pavilion (6,500); Villanova, Pennsylvania
Non-conference regular season
February 28, 1994*; 9:00 pm, SportsChannel Philadelphia		La Salle; Big 5	W 55–54	14–10	The Spectrum (9,499); Philadelphia, Pennsylvania
Big East Conference Regular Season
March 2, 1994; 7:30 pm, ESPN		at Providence	L 67–77	14–11 (9–8)	Providence Civic Center (10,885); Providence, Rhode Island
March 5, 1994; 8:00 pm, Big East TV		Miami (FL)	W 83–63	15–11 (10–8)	John Eleuthère du Pont Pavilion (6,500); Villanova, Pennsylvania
Big East tournament
March 11, 1994; 12:00 pm, Big East TV	(5)	vs. (4) Providence; Quarterfinals	L 66–77	15–12	Madison Square Garden (19,544); New York City, New York
NIT
March 17, 1994*; 8:00 pm		Canisius; First round	W 103–79	16–12	John Eleuthère du Pont Pavilion (3,206); Villanova, Pennsylvania
March 21, 1994*; 8:00 pm		at Duquesne; Second round	W 82–66	17–12	Palumbo Center (6,298); Pittsburgh, Pennsylvania
March 23, 1994*; 7:30 pm, ESPN		Xavier; Quarterfinals	W 76–74	18–12	John Eleuthère du Pont Pavilion (5,680); Villanova, Pennsylvania
March 28, 1994*; 9:30 pm, ESPN		vs. Siena; Semifinals	W 66–58	19–12	Madison Square Garden (16,978); New York City, New York
March 30, 1994*; 9:00 pm, ESPN		vs. Vanderbilt; Championship	W 80–73	20–12	Madison Square Garden (14,434); New York City, New York
*Non-conference game. ^{#}Rankings from AP Poll. (#) Tournament seedings in parentheses. All times are in Eastern Time.
