= 1993–94 St. Francis Terriers men's basketball team =

American college basketball season

1993–94 St. Francis Terriers men's basketball
- Conference: Northeast Conference
- Record: 1–26 (1–17 NEC)
- Head coach: Ron Ganulin (3rd season)
- Assistant coach: Glenn Braica (5th season)
- Home arena: Generoso Pope Athletic Complex

1993–94 Northeast Conference men's basketball standings
| | Conf. | | | | Overall |
| Team | W | | L | PCT | W | | L | PCT |
|---|---|---|---|---|---|---|---|---|
| Rider † | 14 | – | 4 | .778 | 21 | – | 9 | .700 |
| Monmouth | 13 | – | 5 | .722 | 18 | – | 11 | .621 |
| Robert Morris | 11 | – | 7 | .611 | 14 | – | 14 | .500 |
| Wagner | 11 | – | 7 | .611 | 16 | – | 12 | .571 |
| Fairleigh Dickinson | 10 | – | 8 | .556 | 14 | – | 13 | .519 |
| Marist | 10 | – | 8 | .556 | 14 | – | 13 | .519 |
| Mount St. Mary's | 9 | – | 9 | .500 | 13 | – | 15 | .464 |
| Saint Francis (PA) | 9 | – | 9 | .500 | 13 | – | 15 | .464 |
| Long Island | 2 | – | 16 | .111 | 3 | – | 24 | .111 |
| St. Francis Brooklyn | 1 | – | 17 | .056 | 1 | – | 26 | .037 |
† 1994 NEC tournament winner

The 1993–94 St. Francis Terriers men's basketball team represented St. Francis College during the 1993–94 NCAA Division I men's basketball season. The team was coached by Ron Ganulin, who was in his third year at the helm of the St. Francis Terriers. The Terrier's home games were played at the Generoso Pope Athletic Complex. The team has been a member of the Northeast Conference since 1981.

The Terriers finished their season at 1–26 overall and 1–17 in conference play. The Terriers played as the 10th seed in the NEC Tournament and lost in the first round against 7th seed Mount St. Mary's, 81–90. Their 1–26 record is the worst in program history, and it is tied for fewest wins with the 1925–26 team and tied for most losses with the 1983–84 team.

== Roster ==
1993–94 St. Francis Brooklyn Terriers men's basketball team
Players
Coaches

| Pos. | # | Name | Height | Weight | Year | Hometown |
|---|---|---|---|---|---|---|
| F | | James Harrell | 6 ft 7 in (2.01 m) | — | Sr |
| F | | Ivan Patterson | 6 ft 4 in (1.93 m) | — | Jr |
| C | | Haluk Ayata | 6 ft 8 in (2.03 m) | — | Jr |
| G | | Norman Marbury | 6 ft 3 in (1.91 m) | — | Jr |
| F | | Chris Ortiz | 6 ft 5 in (1.96 m) | — | Jr |
| G | | Bryan Willcox | 5 ft 10 in (1.78 m) | — | Jr |
| C | | Darnell Cherry | 6 ft 9 in (2.06 m) | — | Jr |
| F | | Lamont Davis | 6 ft 6 in (1.98 m) | — | Jr |
| F | | John Puckett | 6 ft 7 in (2.01 m) | — | Jr |
| F | | Andre Ollivierra | 6 ft 5 in (1.96 m) | — | Fr |

Head coach

- Ron Ganulin (LIU Brooklyn '67)

Assistant coach(es)

- Glenn Braica (Queens College '89)

Legend

- (C) Team captain
- (S) Suspended
- (I) Ineligible
- (W) Walk-on
- Injured
- Current redshirt

== Schedule and results ==
| Date time, TV | Opponent | Result | Record | Site (attendance) city, state |
Regular season
| November 29, 1993* | at Boston University | L 79–89 | 0–1 | Case Gym (400); Boston, MA |
| December 4, 1993* | at Harvard | L 52–77 | 0–2 | Lavietes Pavilion (308); Cambridge, MA |
| December 7, 1993* | Delaware State | L 80–85 | 0–3 | Generoso Pope Athletic Complex (734); Brooklyn, NY |
| December 14, 1993* | at Providence | L 48–108 | 0–4 | Dunkin' Donuts Center (9,041); Providence, RI |
| December 22, 1993* | Hartford | L 83–86 | 0–5 | Generoso Pope Athletic Complex (441); Brooklyn, NY |
| December 28, 1993* | vs. George Mason | L 70–102 | 0–6 | Mulcahy Center (1,630); New Rochelle, NY |
| December 29, 1993* | at Iona | L 86–101 | 0–7 | Hynes Athletic Center (781); New Rochelle, NY |
| January 4, 1994 | at Long Island | W 78–67 | 1–7 (1–0) | Schwartz Athletic Center (297); Brooklyn, NY |
| January 8, 1994 | at Wagner | L 67–84 | 1–8 (1–1) | Sutter Gymnasium (526); Brooklyn, NY |
| January 10, 1994 | at Monmouth | L 78–91 | 1–9 (1–2) | William T. Boylan Gymnasium (711); West Long Branch, NJ |
| January 13, 1994 | Mount St. Mary's | L 68–90 | 1–10 (1–3) | Generoso Pope Athletic Complex (386); Brooklyn, NY |
| January 15, 1994 | Rider | L 58–83 | 1–11 (1–4) | Generoso Pope Athletic Complex (135); Brooklyn, NY |
| January 18, 1994 | at Fairleigh Dickinson | L 44–59 | 1–12 (1–5) | Rothman Center (218); Hackensack, NJ |
| January 20, 1994 | at Marist | L 76–92 | 1–13 (1–6) | McCann Field House (2,131); Poughkeepsie, NY |
| January 22, 1994 | Saint Francis (PA) | L 62–76 | 1–14 (1–7) | Generoso Pope Athletic Complex (253); Brooklyn, NY |
| January 24, 1994 | Robert Morris | L 53–72 | 1–15 (1–8) | Generoso Pope Athletic Complex (238); Brooklyn, NY |
| January 27, 1994 | Monmouth | L 66–68 | 1–16 (1–9) | Generoso Pope Athletic Complex (149); Brooklyn, NY |
| January 29, 1994 | Wagner | L 69–79 | 1–17 (1–10) | Generoso Pope Athletic Complex (179); Brooklyn, NY |
| February 3, 1994 | at Rider | L 57–78 | 1–18 (1–11) | Alumni Gymnasium (1,237); Lawrenceville, NJ |
| February 5, 1994 | at Mount St. Mary's | L 62–74 | 1–19 (1–12) | Knott Arena (3,180); Emmitsburg, MD |
| February 10, 1994 | Marist | L 81–99 | 1–20 (1–13) | Generoso Pope Athletic Complex (174); Brooklyn, NY |
| February 12, 1994 | Fairleigh Dickinson | L 75–81 | 1–21 (1–14) | Generoso Pope Athletic Complex (105); Brooklyn, NY |
| February 17, 1994 | at Robert Morris | L 70–85 | 1–22 (1–15) | Charles L. Sewall Center (885); Moon Township, PA |
| February 19, 1994 | at Saint Francis (PA) | L 74–89 | 1–23 (1–16) | Maurice Stokes Athletic Center (1,757); Loretto, PA |
| February 21, 1994* | at Hofstra | L 89–96 | 1–24 | Physical Fitness Center (423); Hempstead, NY |
| February 26, 1994 | Long Island | L 77–89 | 1–25 (1–17) | Generoso Pope Athletic Complex (324); Brooklyn, NY |
1994 NEC tournament
| February 28, 1994 | at Mount St. Mary's; First Round | L 81–90 | 1–26 | Knott Arena (1,034); Emmitsburg, MD |
*Non-conference game. ^{#}Rankings from AP Poll. (#) Tournament seedings in parentheses. All times are in Eastern Time.
