= 1993–94 Pittsburgh Panthers men's basketball team =

American college basketball season

1993–94 Pittsburgh Panthers men's basketball
- Conference: Big East Conference (1979–2013)
- Record: 13–14 (7–11 Big East)
- Head coach: Paul Evans (8th season)
- Assistant coaches: Norm Law (8th season); Mark Coleman (8th season); Joe DeSantis (2nd season)
- Home arena: Fitzgerald Field House (Capacity: 4,122)

1993–94 Big East men's basketball standings
	Conf.				Overall
Team	W		L	PCT	W		L	PCT
No. 4 Connecticut	16	–	2	.889	29	–	5	.853
No. 15 Syracuse	13	–	5	.722	23	–	7	.767
Boston College	11	–	7	.611	23	–	11	.676
Providence †	10	–	8	.556	20	–	10	.667
Villanova	10	–	8	.556	20	–	12	.625
Georgetown	10	–	8	.556	19	–	12	.613
Seton Hall	8	–	10	.444	17	–	13	.567
Pittsburgh	7	–	11	.389	13	–	14	.481
St. John's	5	–	13	.278	12	–	17	.414
Miami	0	–	18	.000	7	–	20	.259
† 1994 Big East tournament winner As of April 4, 1994; Rankings from AP poll

The 1993–94 Pittsburgh Panthers men's basketball team represented the University of Pittsburgh in the 1993–94 NCAA Division I men's basketball season. Led by head coach Paul Evans, the Panthers finished with a record of 13–14.
