= 1993–94 Georgetown Hoyas men's basketball team =

American college basketball season

1993–94 Georgetown Hoyas men's basketball

NCAA tournament, second round
- Conference: Big East Conference
- Record: 19-12 (10-8 Big East)
- Head coach: John Thompson (22nd season)
- Assistant coaches: Craig Esherick (12th season); Mike Riley (12th season); Mel Reid (4th season)
- Captain: Joey Brown
- Home arena: USAir Arena

1993–94 Big East men's basketball standings
	Conf.				Overall
Team	W		L	PCT	W		L	PCT
No. 4 Connecticut	16	–	2	.889	29	–	5	.853
No. 15 Syracuse	13	–	5	.722	23	–	7	.767
Boston College	11	–	7	.611	23	–	11	.676
Providence †	10	–	8	.556	20	–	10	.667
Villanova	10	–	8	.556	20	–	12	.625
Georgetown	10	–	8	.556	19	–	12	.613
Seton Hall	8	–	10	.444	17	–	13	.567
Pittsburgh	7	–	11	.389	13	–	14	.481
St. John's	5	–	13	.278	12	–	17	.414
Miami	0	–	18	.000	7	–	20	.259
† 1994 Big East tournament winner As of April 4, 1994; Rankings from AP poll

The 1993–94 Georgetown Hoyas men's basketball team represented Georgetown University in the 1993–94 NCAA Division I college basketball season. John Thompson, coached them in his 22nd season as head coach. They played their home games at USAir Arena in Landover, Maryland. They were members of the Big East Conference and finished the season with a record of 19–12, 10–8 in Big East play. Their record earned them a bye in the first round of the 1994 Big East men's basketball tournament, and they advanced to the tournament final before losing to Providence. They were awarded a No. 9 seed in the Midwest Region of the 1994 NCAA Division I men's basketball tournament – Georgetown's 15th NCAA Tournament appearance in 16 years – and advanced to the second round before losing to the region's No. 1 seed, Arkansas.

== Season recap ==
Four different underclassmen had started at shooting guard for the Hoyas during the previous season, and the lack of a reliable guard had hurt the Hoyas badly – so badly that their 14-year string of consecutive NCAA tournament appearances had finally come to an end, although they had made a run all the way to the final game of the 1993 National Invitation Tournament. To address the shooting guard issue, Thompson signed George Butler, who transferred from Tyler Junior College in Tyler, Texas, to play his junior year at Georgetown. With Butler on the team, Thompson changed Georgetown's offensive strategy from one of feeding the ball to a "big man" at center to an uptempo game by the team's guards, deemphasizing the role of sophomore centers Duane Spencer and Othella Harrington. In the season opener against Maryland, Butler scored 21 points and Harrington had 16 points and 15 rebounds, although Maryland won the game as freshman Terrapins forward Joe Smith debuted with a 26-point game.

Butler played in all 31 games and started 25 of them. He led the team in scoring in three of the first five games and in six games by mid-January 1994, and he scored in double figures 21 times, including a 26-point game against Boston College. For the season, he led the team in three-pointers and free throws and was second in scoring. Harrington, meanwhile, saw his performance decline under the new offensive scheme. Thompson started junior Don Reid at center during the first half of the season, relegating Spencer to the bench and moving Harrington to power forward. Harrington's reflexes tended to be too slow for the new uptempo offense, and his tendency to put the ball on the floor after receiving an inside pass instead of taking the ball straight to the basket also hindered him. By mid-January 1994, Harrington had led the team in scoring in only one game, and his scoring had dropped by 25 percent from the previous season, despite averaging over 30 minutes per game. However, Thompson then moved Harrington back to center, and his play improved. He scored in double figures in 14 of the last 15 games of the season, including a 27-point game against Syracuse, had 17-rebound efforts in two consecutive games, and scored a career-high 31 points at Madison Square Garden against St. John's in an important win in Georgetown's push to return to the NCAA Tournament. He finished as the team leader in scoring and rebounds.

Reid's first two seasons at Georgetown had been unimpressive; he had averaged 1.6 points per game in each of them with limited playing time. Starting at center during the first half of this season while Harrington played power forward, he finally began to excel. He had 11 points and 10 rebounds against Memphis State and a season-high 15 points and 11 rebounds in a game with Villanova. He rebounded in double digits five times, and he averaged 7.7 points and 5.9 rebounds per game for the year.

Senior point guard and second-year team captain Joey Brown played in 30 games and started 29 of them, scoring in double figures 17 times. He had four double-doubles (double figures in scoring and assists), giving him a career total of six, and in the win over Nevada-Las Vegas he became the first Georgetown player to have 1,000 points, 400 rebounds, and 500 assists in his career. He led the team in assists in all but four games and averaged 10.0 points per game.

Senior forward Robert Churchwell scored in double figures 15 times. His best performances were a 24-point game against Nevada-Las Vegas and 19 against Boston College, and he averaged 9.7 points per game.

The Hoyas received a bye in the first round of the 1994 Big East tournament, and defeated Boston College handily in the quarterfinals. Butler scored 24 points in an overtime win over Seton Hall in the semifinals and 18 points against Providence in the final before fouling out with 11:09 left in the game. With him out, the Hoyas had to rely on inexperienced guards for the rest of the game, and Providence took advantage of that to beat Georgetown for the tournament championship.

Georgetown returned to the NCAA tournament, its 15th appearance in the last 16 seasons, seeded ninth in the Midwest Region. The Hoyas upset No. 8 seed Illinois in the first round, with Butler scoring nine points in the first half and 18 in the second half for a career-high 27 points and Reid putting in a 15-point, seven-rebound effort. Two days later, the Hoyas lost to the region's No. 1 seed, Arkansas, the fourth straight time that Georgetown had exited the NCAA Tournament in the second round.

Georgetown's season opener against Maryland was the first meeting of the teams outside of a tournament since a December 5, 1979, game in which John Thompson and Maryland head coach Lefty Driesell had gotten into a shouting match at midcourt. The incident apparently had soured relations between the schools, which had a lengthy history of regular-season meetings before the 1979 game. The 1993 meeting raised hopes that the teams would resume regular meetings, but they did not schedule one another for a non-tournament regular-season game again until 2015.

DePaul's January 22, 1994, victory over Georgetown was the last time the Blue Demons defeated the Hoyas for 20 years. The following season, Georgetown would begin a 14-game winning streak against DePaul which the Blue Demons would not finally break until they upset the Hoyas in the first round of the 2014 Big East tournament in March 2014.

== Roster ==
#	Name	Height	Weight (lbs.)	Position	Class	Hometown	Previous Team(s)
3	Dan Kelly	6'1"	180	G	Fr.	Cincinnati, OH, U.S.	Purcell Marian HS
4	John Jacques	6'3"	175	F	Jr.	Delco, NC, U.S.	Acme-Delco HS
10	Joey Brown	5'10"	185	G	Sr.	Morgan City, LA, U.S.	Morgan City HS
11	Irvin Church	6'1"	185	G	Jr.	Riverdale, MD, U.S.	Parkdale HS
12	Éric Micoud	6'1"	185	G	So.	Lyon, France	St. John's HS (D.C.)
21	Arnette Jordan	6'1"	190	G	So.	Detroit, MI, U.S.	Cass Technical HS
22	Robert Churchwell	6'6"	210	F	Sr.	South Bend, IN, U.S.	Gonzaga College HS (D.C.)
30	George Butler	6'2"	225	G	Jr.	Gary, IN, U.S.	Tyler Junior College (Texas) Lamar University
32	Kevin Millen	6'6"	185	F	Jr.	Memphis, TN, U.S.	Raleigh-Egypt HS
34	Lamont Morgan	6'2"	185	G	Sr.	Washington, DC, U.S.	Gonzaga College HS
40	Duane Spencer	6'10"	205	F/C	So.	New Orleans, LA, U.S.	Walter L. Cohen HS
44	Cheikh Ya-Ya Dia	6'9"	210	F/C	Fr.	Dakar, Senegal	St. John's Prep-Prospect Hall (Maryland)
50	Othella Harrington	6'9"	240	C	So.	Jackson, MS, U.S.	Murrah HS
52	Don Reid	6'8"	270	F	Jr.	Largo, MD, U.S.	Largo HS

== Rankings ==
Ranking movement Legend: ██ Improvement in ranking. ██ Decrease in ranking. ██ Not ranked the previous week. RV=Others receiving votes.
Poll	Pre	Wk 1	Wk 2	Wk 3	Wk 4	Wk 5	Wk 6	Wk 7	Wk 8	Wk 9	Wk 10	Wk 11	Wk 12	Wk 13	Wk 14	Wk 15	Wk 16	Wk 17	Wk 18	Final	Post
AP	15	15	25																		– (Note: No Associated Press Poll this week.)
Coaches (Note: Sources do not provide Coaches' Poll rankings during the season, but confirm that Georgetown was not ranked in the Top 25 in the final or postseason polls.)	N/A	N/A	N/A	N/A	N/A	N/A	N/A	N/A	N/A	N/A	N/A	N/A	N/A	N/A	N/A	N/A	N/A	N/A	N/A		

== 1993–94 Schedule and results ==
Sources

- All times are Eastern

Date time, TV	Rank^{#}	Opponent^{#}	Result	Record	Site (attendance) city, state
Regular Season
Fri., Nov. 26, 1993*	No. 15	Maryland	L 83-84 ^{OT}	0–1	USAir Arena (13,761); Landover, MD
Sat., Nov. 27, 1993*	No. 15	Virginia State	W 84-64	1–1	USAir Arena (7,180); Landover, MD
Wed., Dec. 1, 1993*	No. 25	Southern-New Orleans	W 108-55	2–1	USAir Arena (5,078); Landover, MD
Sat., Dec. 4, 1993	No. 25	Villanova	L 75-76 ^{OT}	2–2 (0–1)	USAir Arena (10,308); Landover, MD
Tue., Dec. 7, 1993		at Miami	W 61-47	3–2 (1–1)	Miami Arena (5,591); Miami, FL
Fri., Dec. 10, 1993*		Morgan State	W 81-39	4–2	USAir Arena (7,451); Landover, MD
Sat., Dec. 18, 1993*		California-Irvine	W 93–64	5–2	USArena (6,483); Landover, MD
Thu., Dec. 30, 1993*		at Memphis State	W 94–78	6–2	Pyramid Arena (17,497); Memphis, TN
Tue., Jan. 4, 1994		at No. 16 Connecticut; Rivalry	L 65-77	6–3 (1–2)	Hartford Civic Center (10,296); Hartford, CT
Sat., Jan. 8, 1994*		Nevada-Las Vegas	W 78–67	7–3	USAir Arena (N/A); Landover, MD
Sun., Jan. 12, 1994		St. John's	W 60-49	8–3 (2–2)	USAir Arena (7,823); Landover, MD
Sat., Jan. 15, 1994		Providence	W 77-70	9–3 (3–2)	USAir Arena (7,593); Landover, MD
Mon., Jan. 17, 1994		at Seton Hall	W 57–53	10–3 (4–2)	Brendan Byrne Arena (13,151); East Rutherford, NJ
Sat., Jan. 22, 1994*		at DePaul	L 51–78	10–4	Rosemont Horizon (N/A); Rosemont, IL
Mon., Jan. 24, 1994		at Pittsburgh	L 60–68	10–5 (4–3)	Civic Arena (17,332); Pittsburgh, PA
Sat., Jan. 29, 1994		Miami	W 77–40	11–5 (5–3)	USAir Arena (8,777); Landover, MD
Wed., Jan. 31, 1994		at Boston College	L 64–71	11–6 (5–4)	Silvio O. Conte Forum (8,606); Chestnut Hill, MA
Sat., Feb. 5, 1994		Seton Hall	W 71–51	12–6 (6–4)	USAir Arena (10,121); Landover, MD
Mon., Feb. 7, 1994; 7:30 p.m.		No. 14 Syracuse; Rivalry	W 60–56	13-6 (7–4)	USAir Arena (11,629); Landover, MD
Wed., Feb. 16, 1994		Pittsburgh	W 67–65	14-6 (8–4)	USAir Arena (8,242); Landover, MD
Sat., Feb. 19, 1994		at St. John's	W 74–61	15–6 (9–4)	Madison Square Garden (13,378); New York, NY
Tue., Feb. 22, 1994		at Villanova	L 64–70	15–7 (9–5)	Spectrum (10,043); Philadelphia, PA
Sat., Feb. 26, 1994		Boston College	W 78–68	16–7 (10–5)	USAir Arena (11,170); Landover, MD
Mon., Feb. 28, 1994		No. 4 Connecticut; Rivalry	L 62–66	16–8 (10–6)	USAir Arena (12,013); Landover, MD
Sun., Mar. 6, 1994; 2:08 p.m.		at No. 14 Syracuse; Rivalry	L 75–81	16–9 (10–7)	Carrier Dome (30,205); Syracuse, NY
Mon., Mar. 7, 1994		at Providence	L 67–73 ^{OT}	16–10 (10–8)	Providence Civic Center (13,106); Providence, RI
Big East tournament
Fri., Mar. 11, 1994		vs. Boston College; Quarterfinal	W 81–58	17–10	Madison Square Garden (19,544); New York, NY
Sat., Mar. 12, 1994		vs. Seton Hall; Semifinal	W 76–71 ^{OT}	18–10	Madison Square Garden (19,544); New York, NY
Sun., Mar. 13, 1994		vs. Providence; Final	L 64–74	18–11	Madison Square Garden (19,544); New York, NY
NCAA tournament
Fri., Mar. 18, 1994		vs. Illinois; Midwest Regional First Round	W 84–77	19–11	The Myriad (13,334); Oklahoma City, OK
Sun., Mar. 20, 1994		vs. No. 2 Arkansas; Midwest Regional Second Round	L 76–85	19–12	The Myriad (13,376); Oklahoma City, OK
*Non-conference game. ^{#}Rankings from AP Poll. (#) Tournament seedings in parentheses.
