= 1993–94 Connecticut Huskies men's basketball team =

American college basketball season

1993–94 Connecticut Huskies men's basketball

Big East Regular Season Champions

NCAA men's Division I tournament, Sweet Sixteen
- Conference: Big East Conference

Ranking
- Coaches: No. 7
- AP: No. 4
- Record: 29–5 (16–2 Big East)
- Head coach: Jim Calhoun (8th season)
- Assistant coaches: Howie Dickenman; Karl Hobbs; Dave Leitao
- Home arena: Hartford Civic Center; Harry A. Gampel Pavilion

1993–94 Big East men's basketball standings
	Conf.				Overall
Team	W		L	PCT	W		L	PCT
No. 4 Connecticut	16	–	2	.889	29	–	5	.853
No. 15 Syracuse	13	–	5	.722	23	–	7	.767
Boston College	11	–	7	.611	23	–	11	.676
Providence †	10	–	8	.556	20	–	10	.667
Villanova	10	–	8	.556	20	–	12	.625
Georgetown	10	–	8	.556	19	–	12	.613
Seton Hall	8	–	10	.444	17	–	13	.567
Pittsburgh	7	–	11	.389	13	–	14	.481
St. John's	5	–	13	.278	12	–	17	.414
Miami	0	–	18	.000	7	–	20	.259
† 1994 Big East tournament winner As of April 4, 1994; Rankings from AP poll

The 1993–94 Connecticut Huskies men's basketball team represented the University of Connecticut in the 1993–94 collegiate men's basketball season. The Huskies completed the season with a 29–5 overall record. The Huskies were members of the Big East Conference where they finished with a 16–2 record and were the Regular Season Champions. UConn advanced to Sweet Sixteen of the 1994 NCAA Division I men's basketball tournament before losing to the Florida Gators 69–60 in overtime.

The Huskies played their home games at Harry A. Gampel Pavilion in Storrs, Connecticut and the Hartford Civic Center in Hartford, Connecticut, and they were led by eighth-year head coach Jim Calhoun.

== Schedule ==
Date time, TV	Rank^{#}	Opponent^{#}	Result	Record	Site (attendance) city, state
Regular Season
11/27/1993*		vs. Towson	W 107–67	1–0	Hershey Arena (2,410); Hershey, Pennsylvania
11/29/1993*; WTNH		at No. 12 Virginia	W 77–36	2–0	University Hall (8,457); Charlottesville, Virginia
12/1/1993*		Yale	W 81–64	3–0	Harry A. Gampel Pavilion (8,241); Storrs, Connecticut
12/8/1993; WTNH	No. 21	at No. 20 Seton Hall	W 82–66	4–0 (1–0)	Brendan Byrne Arena (13,908); East Rutherford, New Jersey
12/11/1993*	No. 21	Central Connecticut	W 117–63	5–0	Hartford Civic Center (15,785); Hartford, Connecticut
12/15/1993*; ESPN	No. 16	Texas	W 96–86	6–0	Harry A. Gampel Pavilion (8,241); Storrs, Connecticut
12/23/1993*	No. 15	Fairfield	W 75–57	7–0	Hartford Civic Center (16,294); Hartford, Connecticut
12/28/1993*	No. 14	vs. Texas Arlington; Big Island Invitational	W 112–72	8–0	Civic Auditorium (2,350); Hilo, HI
12/29/1993*	No. 14	vs. Ohio; Big Island Invitational	L 76–85	8–1	Civic Auditorium (750); Hilo, HI
12/30/1993*	No. 14	vs. Tennessee Tech; Big Island Invitational	W 130–78	9–1	Civic Auditorium (1,800); Hilo, HI
1/2/1994*	No. 14	Winthrop	W 113–59	10–1	Harry A. Gampel Pavilion (8,241); Storrs, Connecticut
1/4/1994; WTNH	No. 16	Georgetown; Rivalry	W 77–65	11–1 (2–0)	Hartford Civic Center (16,294); Hartford, Connecticut
1/8/1994; WTNH	No. 16	Boston College	W 77–71	12–1 (3–0)	Harry A. Gampel Pavilion (8,241); Storrs, Connecticut
1/10/1994; ESPN	No. 14	No. 16 Syracuse; Rivalry	W 75–67	13–1 (4–0)	Hartford Civic Center (16,294); Hartford, Connecticut
1/15/1994; WTNH	No. 14	at St. John's	W 85–81	14–1 (5–0)	Madison Square Garden (19,542); New York City
1/17/1994*	No. 10	Hartford	W 88–62	15–1	Hartford Civic Center (16,294); Hartford, Connecticut
1/19/1994; ESPN	No. 10	at Providence	W 79–78	16–1 (6–0)	Providence Civic Center (13,106); Providence, Rhode Island
1/25/1994; NESN	No. 6	Villanova	W 91–67	17–1 (7–0)	Hartford Civic Center (16,294); Hartford, Connecticut
1/29/1994; WTNH	No. 6	at Pittsburgh	W 88–67	18–1 (8–0)	Civic Arena (6,798); Pittsburgh
2/1/1994; WTNH	No. 5	at No. 15 Syracuse; Rivalry	L 95–105	18–2 (8–1)	Carrier Dome (24,540); Syracuse, New York
2/5/1994; WTNH	No. 5	Miami	W 73–57	19–2 (9–1)	Harry A. Gampel Pavilion (8,241); Storrs, Connecticut
2/9/1994; ESPN	No. 6	at Boston College	W 94–91 ^{2OT}	20–2 (10–1)	Conte Forum (8,706); Boston
2/12/1994; WTNH	No. 6	Seton Hall	W 80–68	21–2 (11–1)	Harry A. Gampel Pavilion (8,241); Storrs, Connecticut
2/15/1994; WTNH	No. 3	at Villanova	L 63–64	21–3 (11–2)	The Pavilion (6,500); Villanova, Pennsylvania
2/19/1994; WTNH	No. 3	Providence	W 81–73	22–3 (12–2)	Harry A. Gampel Pavilion (8,241); Storrs, Connecticut
2/22/1994	No. 5	at Miami	W 74–49	23–3 (13–2)	Miami Arena (4,045); Miami, Florida
2/26/1994; WTNH	No. 5	Pittsburgh	W 78–66	24–3 (14–2)	Hartford Civic Center (16,294); Hartford, Connecticut
2/28/1994; ESPN	No. 4	at Georgetown; Rivalry	W 66–62	25–3 (15–2)	Capital Centre (12,013); Landover, Maryland
3/5/1994; CBS	No. 4	St. John's	W 80–50	26–3 (16–2)	Hartford Civic Center (16,294); Hartford, Connecticut
Big East tournament
3/11/1994; WTNH	No. 2	vs. St. John's; Quarterfinals	W 97–77	27–3	Madison Square Garden (19,544); New York
3/12/1994; CBS	No. 2	vs. Providence; Semifinals	L 67–69	27–4	Madison Square Garden (19,544); New York
NCAA tournament
3/17/1994*; CBS	No. 4 (2)	vs. No. (15) Rider; First Round	W 64–46	28–4	Nassau Veterans Memorial Coliseum (16,204); Uniondale, New York
3/19/1994*; CBS	No. 4 (2)	vs. No. (10) George Washington; Second Round	W 75–63	29–4	Nassau Veterans Memorial Coliseum (16,204); Uniondale, New York
3/25/1994*; CBS	No. 4 (2)	vs. No. 14 (3) Florida; Sweet Sixteen	L 60–69 ^{OT}	29–5	Miami Arena (15,217); Miami, Florida
*Non-conference game. ^{#}Rankings from AP Poll. (#) Tournament seedings in parentheses. All times are in Eastern Time.

Schedule Source:
