= 1993–94 Syracuse Orangemen basketball team =

American college basketball season

1993–94 Syracuse Orangemen basketball

NCAA tournament, Sweet Sixteen
- Conference: Big East Conference

Ranking
- Coaches: No. 14
- AP: No. 15
- Record: 23–7 (13–5 Big East)
- Head coach: Jim Boeheim (18th season)
- Assistant coaches: Bernie Fine (18th season); Wayne Morgan (10th season)
- Home arena: Carrier Dome

1993–94 Big East men's basketball standings
	Conf.				Overall
Team	W		L	PCT	W		L	PCT
No. 4 Connecticut	16	–	2	.889	29	–	5	.853
No. 15 Syracuse	13	–	5	.722	23	–	7	.767
Boston College	11	–	7	.611	23	–	11	.676
Providence †	10	–	8	.556	20	–	10	.667
Villanova	10	–	8	.556	20	–	12	.625
Georgetown	10	–	8	.556	19	–	12	.613
Seton Hall	8	–	10	.444	17	–	13	.567
Pittsburgh	7	–	11	.389	13	–	14	.481
St. John's	5	–	13	.278	12	–	17	.414
Miami	0	–	18	.000	7	–	20	.259
† 1994 Big East tournament winner As of April 4, 1994; Rankings from AP poll

The 1993–94 Syracuse Orangemen basketball team represented Syracuse University in the 1993–94 NCAA Division I men's basketball season. The head coach was Jim Boeheim, serving for his 18th year. The team played home games at the Carrier Dome in Syracuse, New York. The team finished with a 23–7 (13–5) record and advanced to Sweet Sixteen of the NCAA tournament.

== Roster ==
1993–94 Syracuse Orange men's basketball team
Players
Coaches

Pos.	#	Name	Height	Weight	Year	Hometown
C	4	Otis Hill	6 ft 8 in (2.03 m)	235 lb (107 kg)	Fr	White Plains, New York
PG	15	Adrian Autry	6 ft 4 in (1.93 m)	207 lb (94 kg)	Sr	Monroe, North Carolina
SG	21	Lawrence Moten	6 ft 5 in (1.96 m)	180 lb (82 kg)	Jr	Washington, D.C.
G/F	34	Lucious Jackson	6 ft 6 in (1.98 m)	205 lb (93 kg)	Jr	Beaumont, Texas
G/F	35	Scott McCorkle	6 ft 5 in (1.96 m)	225 lb (102 kg)	Sr	Mission Viejo, California
SF	44	John Wallace	6 ft 8 in (2.03 m)	215 lb (98 kg)	So	Rochester, New York

Head coach

- Jim Boeheim (Syracuse)

Assistant coach(es)

- Bernie Fine (Syracuse)
- Wayne Morgan (St. Lawrence)

Legend

- (C) Team captain
- (S) Suspended
- (I) Ineligible
- (W) Walk-on
- Injured
- Current redshirt

Roster

== Schedule and results ==
Date time, TV	Rank^{#}	Opponent^{#}	Result	Record	Site city, state
Regular season
Nov 28, 1993*	No. 20	Tennessee	W 98–65	1–0	Carrier Dome; Syracuse, New York
Dec 1, 1993*	No. 18	Cornell	W 95–59	2–0	Carrier Dome; Syracuse, New York
Dec 3, 1993*	No. 18	Boston University	W 89–70	3–0	Carrier Dome; Syracuse, New York
Dec 4, 1993*	No. 18	No. 20 Vanderbilt	W 78–62	4–0	Carrier Dome; Syracuse, New York
Dec 9, 1993	No. 13	Boston College	L 58–75	4–1 (0–1)	Carrier Dome; Syracuse, New York
Dec 13, 1993*	No. 21	Lafayette	W 104–75	5–1	Carrier Dome; Syracuse, New York
Dec 18, 1993*	No. 21	Maryland Eastern Shore	W 108–71	6–1	Carrier Dome; Syracuse, New York
Dec 22, 1993	No. 21	Miami (FL)	W 81–52	7–1 (1–1)	Carrier Dome; Syracuse, New York
Dec 29, 1993*	No. 19	Colgate	W 85–74	8–1	Carrier Dome; Syracuse, New York
Jan 8, 1994	No. 18	Pittsburgh	W 79–75	9–1 (2–1)	Carrier Dome; Syracuse, New York
Jan 10, 1994	No. 16	at No. 14 Connecticut; Rivalry	L 67–75	9–2 (2–2)	Hartford Civic Center; Hartford, Connecticut
Jan 15, 1994	No. 16	at Villanova	W 88–85	10–2 (3–2)	The Pavilion; Philadelphia, Pennsylvania
Jan 18, 1994	No. 16	St. John's	W 92–82	11–2 (4–2)	Carrier Dome; Syracuse, New York
Jan 22, 1994	No. 16	at Seton Hall	W 78–74	12–2 (5–2)	Brendan Byrne Arena; East Rutherford, New Jersey
Jan 25, 1994	No. 14	at Providence	L 82–96	12–3 (5–3)	Providence Civic Center; Providence, Rhode Island
Jan 29, 1994	No. 14	Villanova	W 87–68	13–3 (6–3)	Carrier Dome; Syracuse, New York
Feb 1, 1994	No. 15	No. 5 Connecticut; Rivalry	W 108–95	14–3 (7–3)	Carrier Dome; Syracuse, New York
Feb 5, 1994	No. 15	at Pittsburgh	W 80–77	15–3 (8–3)	Fitzgerald Field House; Pittsburgh, Pennsylvania
Feb 7, 1994	No. 14	at Georgetown; Rivalry	L 56–60	15–4 (8–4)	USAir Arena; Landover, Maryland
Feb 12, 1994*	No. 14	No. 4 Kentucky	W 93–85	16–4	Carrier Dome; Syracuse, New York
Feb 15, 1994	No. 14	Providence	W 79–74	17–4 (9–4)	Carrier Dome; Syracuse, New York
Feb 19, 1994	No. 14	at Boston College	L 83–89	17–5 (9–5)	Silvio O. Conte Forum; Boston, Massachusetts
Feb 23, 1994	No. 18	Seton Hall	W 91–69	18–5 (10–5)	Carrier Dome; Syracuse, New York
Feb 27, 1994	No. 18	at St. John's	W 82–81	19–5 (11–5)	Madison Square Garden; New York, New York
Mar 1, 1994	No. 14	at Miami (FL)	W 71–69	20–5 (12–5)	Miami Arena; Miami, Florida
Mar 6, 1994	No. 14	Georgetown; Rivalry	W 81–75	21–5 (13–5)	Carrier Dome; Syracuse, New York
Big East tournament
Mar 11, 1994*	No. 13	vs. Seton Hall; Quarterfinals	L 80–81 ^{OT}	21–6	Madison Square Garden; New York, New York
NCAA tournament
Mar 17, 1994*	(4 W) No. 15	vs. (13 W) Hawaii; First round	W 92–78	22–6	Dee Events Center; Ogden, Utah
Mar 19, 1994*	(4 W) No. 15	vs. (12 W) Wisconsin–Green Bay; Second Round	W 64–59	23–6	Dee Events Center; Ogden, Utah
Mar 24, 1994*	(4 W) No. 15	vs. (1 W) No. 5 Missouri; West Regional semifinal – Sweet Sixteen	L 88–98 ^{OT}	23–7	L.A. Sports Arena; Los Angeles, California
*Non-conference game. ^{#}Rankings from AP poll. (#) Tournament seedings in parentheses. W=West. All times are in EST.
