= 1993–94 Rider Broncs men's basketball team =

American college basketball season

1993–94 Rider Broncs men's basketball
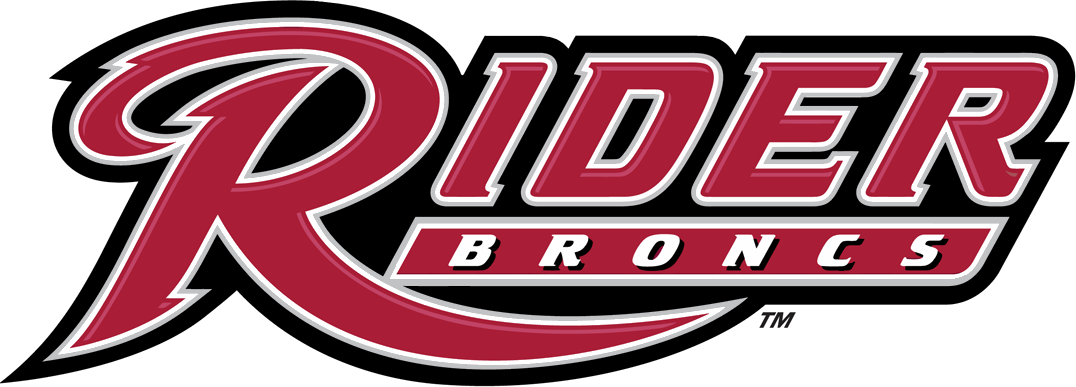

NEC Regular season champions NEC tournament champions

NCAA tournament, first round
- Conference: Northeast Conference
- Record: 21–9 (14–4 NEC)
- Head coach: Kevin Bannon
- Assistant coach: Tod Kowalczyk
- Home arena: Alumni Gymnasium

1993–94 Northeast Conference men's basketball standings
	Conf.				Overall
Team	W		L	PCT	W		L	PCT
Rider †	14	–	4	.778	21	–	9	.700
Monmouth	13	–	5	.722	18	–	11	.621
Robert Morris	11	–	7	.611	14	–	14	.500
Wagner	11	–	7	.611	16	–	12	.571
Fairleigh Dickinson	10	–	8	.556	14	–	13	.519
Marist	10	–	8	.556	14	–	13	.519
Mount St. Mary's	9	–	9	.500	13	–	15	.464
Saint Francis (PA)	9	–	9	.500	13	–	15	.464
Long Island	2	–	16	.111	3	–	24	.111
St. Francis Brooklyn	1	–	17	.056	1	–	26	.037
† 1994 NEC tournament winner

The 1993–94 Rider Broncs men's basketball team represented Rider University in the 1993–94 NCAA Division I men's basketball season. The Broncs, led by head coach Kevin Bannon, played their home games at the Alumni Gymnasium in Lawrenceville, New Jersey as members of the Northeast Conference. They finished the season 21–9, 14–4 in NEC play to finish atop the conference standings. In the NEC tournament, they defeated No. 8 seed Saint Francis (PA), No. 4 seed Wagner, and No. 2 seed Monmouth to win the tournament and earn an automatic bid to the NCAA tournament. As the No. 15 seed in the East region of the 1994 NCAA tournament, the Broncs were defeated by No. 2 seed Connecticut, 64–46, in the opening round.

== Roster ==
1993–94 Rider Broncs men's basketball team
Players	Coaches
Pos. / # / Name / Height / Weight / Year / Previous school / Hometown; F / 30 / Charles Smith / 6 ft 6 in (1.98 m) / 175 lb (79 kg) / Fr / Chichester / Philadelphia, Pennsylvania	Head coach: Kevin Bannon (Saint Peter's); Assistant coach(es): Tod Kowalczyk (Minnesota Duluth); Legend: (C) Team captain; (S) Suspended; (I) Ineligible; (W) Walk-on; Injured; Current redshirt; Roster

== Schedule and results ==
Date time, TV	Rank^{#}	Opponent^{#}	Result	Record	Site (attendance) city, state
Regular season
Nov 26, 1993*		Bucknell	W 99–66	1–0	Alumni Gymnasium; Lawrenceville, New Jersey
Nov 30, 1993*		at Maryland	L 79–93	1–1	Cole Fieldhouse; College Park, Maryland
Dec 3, 1993*		Army	W 96–74	2–1	Alumni Gymnasium; Lawrenceville, New Jersey
Dec 6, 1993*		at Manhattan	L 55–70	2–2	Draddy Gymnasium; New York, New York
Dec 8, 1993*		at Drexel	L 57–88	2–3	Daskalakis Athletic Center; Philadelphia, Pennsylvania
Dec 11, 1993*		Lafayette	W 87–75	3–3	Alumni Gymnasium; Lawrenceville, New Jersey
Dec 29, 1993*		at Stetson	W 69–67	4–3	Edmunds Center; DeLand, Florida
Dec 30, 1993*		vs. Northwestern	L 68–74	4–4	Edmunds Center; DeLand, Florida
NEC tournament
Mar 1, 1994*		Saint Francis (PA); Quarterfinals	W 74–60	19–8	Alumni Gymnasium; Lawrenceville, New Jersey
Mar 2, 1994*		Wagner; Semifinals	W 83–75	20–8	Alumni Gymnasium; Lawrenceville, New Jersey
Mar 3, 1994*		Monmouth; Championship game	W 62–56	21–8	Alumni Gymnasium; Lawrenceville, New Jersey
NCAA tournament
Mar 17, 1994*; CBS	(15 E)	vs. (2 E) No. 4 Connecticut; First round	L 46–64	21–9	Nassau Coliseum (16,204); Uniondale, New York
*Non-conference game. ^{#}Rankings from AP Poll. (#) Tournament seedings in parentheses. E=East. All times are in Eastern.
