= 1993–94 Florida Gators men's basketball team =

American college basketball season

1993–94 Florida Gators men's basketball

SEC East Division Champions

NCAA tournament, Final Four
- Conference: Southeastern Conference

Ranking
- Coaches: No. 4
- AP: No. 14
- Record: 29–8 (12–4 SEC)
- Head coach: Lon Kruger (4th season)
- Assistant coaches: Robert McCullum (3rd season); Ron Stewart; R. C. Buford (1st season)
- Home arena: O'Connell Center

1993–94 Southeastern Conference men's basketball standings
	Conf.				Overall
Team	W		L	PCT	W		L	PCT
East
No. 14 Florida	12	–	4	.750	29	–	8	.784
No. 7 Kentucky †	12	–	4	.750	27	–	7	.794
Vanderbilt	9	–	7	.563	20	–	12	.625
Georgia	7	–	9	.438	14	–	16	.467
South Carolina	4	–	12	.250	9	–	19	.321
Tennessee	2	–	14	.125	5	–	22	.185
West
No. 2 Arkansas	14	–	2	.875	31	–	3	.912
Alabama	12	–	4	.750	20	–	10	.667
Mississippi State	9	–	7	.563	18	–	11	.621
Ole Miss	7	–	9	.438	14	–	13	.519
LSU	5	–	11	.313	11	–	16	.407
Auburn	3	–	13	.188	11	–	17	.393
† 1994 SEC tournament winner Rankings from AP Poll

The 1993–94 Florida Gators men's basketball team represented the University of Florida as a member of the Southeastern Conference during the 1993–94 NCAA men's basketball season. Led by head coach Lon Kruger, the Gators reached the Final Four for the first time in program history, and finished with an overall record of 29–8 (12–4 SEC).

== Roster ==
1993–94 Florida Gators men's basketball team
Players
Coaches

Pos.	#	Name	Height	Weight	Year	Hometown
F	3	Brian Thompson	6 ft 6 in (1.98 m)	218 lb (99 kg)	So	Atlanta, GA
G	4	Craig Brown	6 ft 3 in (1.91 m)	188 lb (85 kg)	Sr	Steelton, Pennsylvania
G/F	5	Jason Anderson	6 ft 4 in (1.93 m)	195 lb (88 kg)	So	College Park, Georgia
G	10	Greg Williams	6 ft 3 in (1.91 m)	183 lb (83 kg)	Fr	Fairfax, Virginia
G	12	Dan Cross	6 ft 3 in (1.91 m)	193 lb (88 kg)	Jr	Carbondale, Illinois
F	15	Martti Kuisma	6 ft 11 in (2.11 m)	236 lb (107 kg)	Sr	Helsinki, Finland
F	33	Tony Mickens	6 ft 5 in (1.96 m)	220 lb (100 kg)	Jr	Memphis, Tennessee
C	35	Dametri Hill	6 ft 7 in (2.01 m)	286 lb (130 kg)	So	St. Petersburg, Florida
F/C	40	Svein Dyrkolbotn	6 ft 8 in (2.03 m)	244 lb (111 kg)	Jr	Bergen, Norway
F	55	Andrew DeClercq	6 ft 10 in (2.08 m)	230 lb (104 kg)	So	Clearwater, Florida
G		Clayton Bates	6 ft 2 in (1.88 m)	190 lb (86 kg)	So	Gainesville, Florida

Head coach

- Lon Kruger (Kansas State)

Assistant coach(es)

Legend

- (C) Team captain
- (S) Suspended
- (I) Ineligible
- (W) Walk-on
- Injured
- Current redshirt

== Schedule and results ==
Date time, TV	Rank^{#}	Opponent^{#}	Result	Record	Site city, state
Non-conference Regular season
Nov 26, 1993*		Florida International	W 86–66	1–0	O'Connell Center; Gainesville, Florida
Dec 4, 1993*		at Texas	W 76–68	2–0	Frank Erwin Center; Austin, Texas
Dec 5, 1993*		South Florida	W 66–55	3–0	O'Connell Center; Gainesville, Florida
Dec 8, 1993*		at Jacksonville	W 68–67	4–0	Jacksonville Memorial Coliseum; Jacksonville, Florida
Dec 11, 1993*		Stetson	W 90–44	5–0	O'Connell Center; Gainesville, Florida
Dec 18, 1993*		vs. Florida State	L 59–69	5–1	
Dec 20, 1993*		Central Florida	W 83–69	6–1	O'Connell Center; Gainesville, Florida
Dec 22, 1993*		at Villanova	W 85–77	7–1	The Pavilion; Philadelphia, Pennsylvania
Dec 27, 1993*		vs. No. 20 Oklahoma State; Rainbow Classic	W 74–69	8–1	Neal S. Blaisdell Center; Honolulu, Hawaii
Dec 28, 1993*		vs. No. 11 Louisville; Rainbow Classic	L 68–83	8–2	Neal S. Blaisdell Center; Honolulu, Hawaii
Dec 29, 1993*		vs. Evansville; Rainbow Classic	W 66–63	9–2	Neal S. Blaisdell Center; Honolulu, Hawaii
SEC Regular season
Jan 5, 1994		LSU	W 74–73	10–2 (1–0)	O'Connell Center; Gainesville, Florida
Jan 8, 1994		at Tennessee	W 86–71	11–2 (2–0)	Thompson-Boling Arena; Knoxville, Tennessee
Jan 11, 1994*		vs. South Florida	W 69–64	12–2	
Jan 15, 1994		at South Carolina	W 77–75	13–2 (3–0)	Carolina Coliseum; Columbia, South Carolina
Jan 18, 1994		No. 7 Kentucky	W 59–57	14–2 (4–0)	O'Connell Center; Gainesville, Florida
Jan 22, 1994		at Alabama	L 61–69	14–3 (4–1)	Coleman Coliseum; Tuscaloosa, Alabama
Jan 26, 1994		at Georgia	W 100–78	15–3 (5–1)	Stegeman Coliseum; Athens, Georgia
Jan 29, 1994		Vanderbilt	W 75–66	16–3 (6–1)	O'Connell Center; Gainesville, Florida
Feb 2, 1994	No. 24	Auburn	W 68–67	17–3 (7–1)	O'Connell Center; Gainesville, Florida
Feb 5, 1994	No. 24	Mississippi State	W 84–75	18–3 (8–1)	O'Connell Center; Gainesville, Florida
Feb 9, 1994	No. 20	at Ole Miss	W 74–55	19–3 (9–1)	Tad Smith Coliseum; Oxford, Mississippi
Feb 12, 1994	No. 20	at No. 3 Arkansas	L 87–99	19–4 (9–2)	Bud Walton Arena; Fayetteville, Arkansas
Feb 16, 1994	No. 17	at Georgia	W 91–79	20–4 (10–2)	Stegeman Coliseum; Athens, Georgia
Feb 19, 1994	No. 17	South Carolina	W 88–64	21–4 (11–2)	O'Connell Center; Gainesville, Florida
Feb 21, 1994*	No. 16	Florida State	W 72–61	22–4	O'Connell Center; Gainesville, Florida
Feb 26, 1994	No. 16	Vanderbilt	L 78–82	22–5 (11–3)	O'Connell Center; Gainesville, Florida
Mar 2, 1994	No. 19	at No. 7 Kentucky	L 77–80	22–6 (11–4)	Rupp Arena; Lexington, Kentucky
Mar 5, 1994*	No. 19	Tennessee	W 82–71	23–6 (12–4)	O'Connell Center; Gainesville, FL
SEC Tournament
Mar 11, 1994*	No. 17	vs. South Carolina; SEC Tournament Quarterfinal	W 84–57	24–6	The Pyramid; Memphis, TN
Mar 12, 1994*	No. 17	vs. Alabama; SEC Tournament Semifinal	W 68–52	25–6	The Pyramid; Memphis, TN
Mar 13, 1994*	No. 17	vs. No. 10 Kentucky; SEC tournament championship	L 60–73	25–7	The Pyramid; Memphis, TN
NCAA Tournament
Mar 17, 1994*	(3 E) No. 14	vs. (14 E) James Madison; First round	W 64–62	26–7	Nassau Coliseum; Uniondale, NY
Mar 19, 1994*	(3 E) No. 14	vs. (11 E) Penn; Second Round	W 70–58	27–7	Nassau Coliseum; Uniondale, NY
Mar 25, 1994*	(3 E) No. 14	vs. (2 E) No. 4 Connecticut; East Regional semifinal	W 69–60 ^{OT}	28–7	Miami Arena; Miami, FL
Mar 27, 1994*	(3 E) No. 14	vs. (9 E) Boston College; East Regional final	W 74–66	29–7	Miami Arena; Miami, FL
Apr 2, 1994*	(3 E) No. 14	vs. No. 6 Duke; National semifinal	L 65–70	29–8	Charlotte Coliseum; Charlotte, NC
*Non-conference game. ^{#}Rankings from AP Poll. (#) Tournament seedings in parentheses. E=East.

== Awards and honors ==
- Dan Cross – Honorable Mention, AP All-America Team
- Lon Kruger – SEC Coach of the Year
