= Bill Curley =

American basketball player and coach (born 1972)

Emerson Lions
- Title: Head coach
- League: NEWMAC

Personal information
- Born: May 29, 1972 (age 54) Boston, Massachusetts, U.S.
- Listed height: 6 ft 9 in (2.06 m)
- Listed weight: 220 lb (100 kg)

Career information
- High school: Duxbury (Duxbury, Massachusetts)
- College: Boston College (1990–1994)
- NBA draft: 1994: 1st round, 22nd overall pick
- Drafted by: San Antonio Spurs
- Playing career: 1994–2001
- Position: Power forward
- Number: 17, 15, 31, 30
- Coaching career: 2011–present

Career history

Playing
- 1994–1995: Detroit Pistons
- 1997–1999: Minnesota Timberwolves
- 1999: Golden State Warriors
- 2000: Houston Rockets
- 2000: Golden State Warriors
- 2000: Dallas Mavericks
- 2000–2001: Golden State Warriors

Coaching
- 2011–2014: Emerson (assistant)
- 2014–present: Emerson

Career highlights
- Third-team All-American – NABC (1994); 2× First-team All-Big East (1993, 1994); Second-team Parade All-American (1990); McDonald's All-American (1990)

Career NBA statistics
- Points: 394 (2.7 ppg)
- Rebounds: 290 (2.0 rpg)
- Stats at NBA.com
- Stats at Basketball Reference

William Michael Curley (born May 29, 1972) is an American basketball coach and former professional player who is the head coach of the Emerson Lions men's basketball team.

Curley has two brothers and one sister, with both brothers, Matty and Mickey, having played professional basketball overseas.

== High school/college career ==
A 6'9" power forward with a reputation for being a solid outside shooter in spite of his size, Curley led his Duxbury High School Green Dragons basketball team to a Massachusetts State Championship in 1989. He was selected as a McDonald's All-American in 1990, and was one of the most highly recruited, sought after by Notre Dame, Duke, Villanova, North Carolina and the University of Connecticut.

He accepted a scholarship offer from the Boston College Eagles. There, Curley led a renaissance of the school's basketball program. He was the Big East Conference Rookie of the Year in 1991, and was twice selected as a first team All-Big East player.

A four-time team MVP, Curley was the team leader on the 1994 squad which advanced to the Elite Eight of the NCAA basketball tournament. In 1994, he received the BC "Eagle of the Year" award as the school's top athlete (subsequently inducted into the Boston College Hall of Fame on November 12, 2006). His college coach, Jim O'Brien called him "...one of the best players ever at Boston College."

== NBA career ==
Selected by the San Antonio Spurs in the first round (22nd overall) of the 1994 NBA draft, Curley played in five NBA seasons, for five different teams: the Detroit Pistons, Minnesota Timberwolves, Houston Rockets, Golden State Warriors and Dallas Mavericks. His professional career was blighted with injuries, and he missed the entire schedule from 1995 to 1997, playing a maximum of 53 regular season contests, in his rookie year.

Upon retiring, with averages of 2.7 points and two rebounds, in only 147 games, Curley settled with his wife and three children in his hometown of Duxbury, Massachusetts, running summer basketball camps.

== Coaching career ==
In 2011, he became an assistant at Emerson College in Boston under his Boston College coach Jim O'Brien. Upon O'Brien's retirement in 2014, Curley was named interim head coach of the Lions. In 2019, he led Emerson to its first NEWMAC championship and its first NCAA tournament appearance.
