= Michael Smith (basketball, born 1972) =

American basketball player (born 1972)

Personal information
- Born: March 28, 1972 (age 54) Washington, D.C., U.S.
- Listed height: 6 ft 8 in (2.03 m)
- Listed weight: 230 lb (104 kg)

Career information
- High school: Dunbar (Washington, D.C.)
- College: Providence (1991–1994)
- NBA draft: 1994: 2nd round, 35th overall pick
- Drafted by: Sacramento Kings
- Playing career: 1994–2004
- Position: Power forward
- Number: 34

Career history
- 1994–1998: Sacramento Kings
- 1998–1999: Vancouver Grizzlies
- 1999–2001: Washington Wizards
- 2001–2002: Snaidero Udine
- 2002–2003: Idaho Stampede
- 2003–2004: Dakota Wizards

Career highlights
- 2× Second-team All-Big East (1993, 1994); Third-team All-Big East (1992); Third-team Parade All-American (1990); McDonald's All-American (1990)

Career NBA statistics
- Points: 2,527 (5.6 ppg)
- Rebounds: 3,193 (7.1 rpg)
- Assists: 661 (1.5 apg)
- Stats at NBA.com
- Stats at Basketball Reference

Michael John Smith (born March 28, 1972) is an American former professional basketball player. Nicknamed "the Animal", he played in seven seasons from 1994–2001 in the National Basketball Association (NBA).

A 6'8" power forward from Providence College, Smith was selected by the Sacramento Kings in the second round of the 1994 NBA draft. He would play for the Kings, Vancouver Grizzlies, and Washington Wizards, tallying 2,527 NBA career points and 3,193 NBA career rebounds. He also played with the Indiana Pacers during the 2003 preseason.

On November 10, 1995, as a member of the Kings, Smith was involved in a physical altercation with Indiana Pacers forward Dale Davis. All bench players from both teams left their benches, and were automatically fined $2,500 and suspended for one game for leaving the bench. Smith and Davis were both fined $20,000 and suspended for two games.

During his time with the Washington Wizards, he was a teammate of an unrelated player named Mike Smith.

== NBA career statistics ==
Legend
GP	Games played	GS	Games started	MPG	Minutes per game
FG%	Field goal percentage	3P%	3-point field goal percentage	FT%	Free throw percentage
RPG	Rebounds per game	APG	Assists per game	SPG	Steals per game
BPG	Blocks per game	PPG	Points per game	**Bold**	Career high
*	Led the league

=== Regular season ===
Year	Team	GP	GS	MPG	FG%	3P%	FT%	RPG	APG	SPG	BPG	PPG
1994–95	Sacramento	**82***	0	21.2	.542	.000	.485	5.9	.8	.7	.6	**6.9**
1995–96	Sacramento	65	0	21.3	**.605**	**1.000**	.384	6.0	1.7	.7	**.7**	5.5
1996–97	Sacramento	81	**52**	**31.1**	.539	—	.496	**9.5**	**2.4**	**1.0**	**.7**	6.6
1997–98	Sacramento	18	4	19.3	.426	—	.567	5.6	1.6	.8	.5	3.8
1997–98	Vancouver	30	29	23.5	.504	.000	.658	6.9	2.0	.9	.2	6.1
1998–99	Vancouver	48	10	22.9	.535	.000	.594	7.3	1.0	**1.0**	.4	4.8
1999–00	Washington	46	46	24.9	.563	.000	**.723**	7.2	1.2	.6	.5	6.3
2000–01	Washington	79	29	20.4	.486	.000	.578	7.1	1.3	.7	.5	3.8
Career		449	170	23.5	.538	.143	.529	7.1	1.5	.8	.6	5.6

=== Playoffs ===
Year	Team	GP	GS	MPG	FG%	3P%	FT%	RPG	APG	SPG	BPG	PPG
1996	Sacramento	4	0	21.8	.583	—	.455	5.5	2.0	.3	.5	4.8
Career		4	0	21.8	.583	—	.455	5.5	2.0	.3	.5	4.8
