= 1993–94 NCAA Division I men's basketball rankings =

- Season: 1993–94
- NCAA Tournament: 1994
- Preseason No. 1: North Carolina
- NCAA Tournament Champions: Arkansas
NCAA Division I men's basketball rankings


The 1993–94 NCAA Division I men's basketball rankings was made up of two human polls, the AP Poll and the Coaches Poll, in addition to various other preseason polls.

== Legend ==
	Increase in ranking
	Decrease in ranking
	New to rankings from previous week
Italics	Number of first place votes
(#–#)	Win–loss record
т	Tied with team above or below also with this symbol

== AP Poll ==
Six different teams held the top spot for at least one week – Arkansas (9), North Carolina (5), Duke (1), Kansas (1), Kentucky (1), UCLA (1).

	Preseason	Week 2 Nov. 22	Week 3 Nov. 29	Week 4 Dec. 6	Week 5 Dec. 13	Week 6 Dec. 20	Week 7 Dec. 27	Week 8 Jan. 3	Week 9 Jan. 10	Week 10 Jan. 17	Week 11 Jan. 24	Week 12 Jan. 31	Week 13 Feb. 7	Week 14 Feb. 14	Week 15 Feb. 21	Week 16 Feb. 28	Week 17 Mar. 7	Final Mar. 14	
1.	North Carolina	North Carolina (2–0)	Kentucky (2–1)	Arkansas (3–0)	Arkansas (5–0)	Arkansas (6–0)	Arkansas (7–0)	Arkansas (8–0)	North Carolina (12–1)	Kansas (16–1)	UCLA (13–0)	Duke (15–1)	North Carolina (19–3)	Arkansas (18–2)	Arkansas (20–2)	Arkansas (22–2)	Arkansas (24–2)	North Carolina (27–6)	1.
2.	Kentucky	Kentucky (0–0)	Arkansas (3–0)	North Carolina (6–1)	North Carolina (7–1)	North Carolina (8–1)	North Carolina (9–1)	North Carolina (10–1)	Duke (9–0)	UCLA (11–0)	Duke (13–1)	North Carolina (17–3)	Duke (16–2)	North Carolina (20–4)	Duke (19–3)	Duke (21–3)	Connecticut (26–3)	Arkansas (25–3)	2.
3.	Arkansas	Arkansas (0–0)	Kansas (5–1)	Michigan (4–0)	Duke (5–0)	Duke (5–0)	Duke (6–0)	Duke (7–0)	Kansas (15–1)	Arkansas (12–1)	Kansas (17–2)	Kansas (19–2)	Arkansas (16–2)	Connecticut (21–2)	Michigan (19–4)	Michigan (20–4)	Missouri (24–2)	Purdue (26–4)	3.
4.	Duke	Duke (0–0)	North Carolina (6–1)	Duke (3–0)	Temple (3–0)	Temple (4–0)	Temple (4–0)	Kentucky (9–1)	Arkansas (10–1)	North Carolina (13–2)	North Carolina (14–3)	UCLA (14–1)	Kentucky (18–3)	Kansas (21–3)	North Carolina (21–5)	Connecticut (24–3)	North Carolina (24–6)	Connecticut (27–4)	4.
5.	Michigan	Michigan (0–0)	Michigan (1–0)	Temple (2–0)	Kentucky (3–1)	Kentucky (4–1)	Kentucky (7–1)	Kansas (13–1)	UCLA (9–0)	Duke (11–1)	Arkansas (13–2)	Connecticut (18–1)	Kansas (20–3)	Louisville (20–2)	Connecticut (22–3)	North Carolina (23–5)	Duke (22–4)	Missouri (25–3)	5.
6.	California	Kansas (2–0)	Duke (3–0)	Kentucky (2–1)	Kansas (8–1)	Kansas (9–1)	Kansas (11–1)	UCLA (7–0)	Arizona (12–1)	UMass (13–1)	Connecticut (16–1)	Arkansas (14–2)	Connecticut (19–2)	Duke (17–3)	Missouri (20–2)	Missouri (22–2)	Purdue (25–4)	Duke (23–5)	6.
7.	Louisville	Louisville (0–0)	Temple (0–0)	Kansas (5–1)	Michigan (5–1)	Michigan (5–1)	Michigan (5–1)	Temple (6–1)	UMass (11–1)	Kentucky (13–2)	Purdue (16–1)	Kentucky (16–3)	Louisville (18–2)	Michigan (17–4)	Kentucky (20–5)	Kentucky (22–5)	Arizona (25–4)	Kentucky (26–6)	7.
8.	Temple	Temple (0–0)	Oklahoma State (4–1)	UMass (5–1)	UMass (7–1)	UMass (7–1)	UCLA (6–0)	UMass (9–1)	Kentucky (11–2)	Indiana (10–2)	UMass (15–2)	Purdue (17–2)	Temple (16–2)	UCLA (17–2)	Temple (19–4)	Arizona (23–4)	Michigan (20–6)	UMass (27–6)	8.
9.	Kansas	Minnesota (2–0)	UMass (5–1)	UCLA (2–0)	UCLA (4–0)	UCLA (5–0)	UMass (7–1)	Arizona (10–1)	Purdue (13–0)	Arizona (13–2)	Kentucky (14–3)	Louisville (16–2)	UCLA (15–2)	Purdue (20–3)	Arizona (21–4)	Purdue (23–4)	UMass (24–6)	Arizona (25–5)	9.
10.	Minnesota	Oklahoma State (0–0)	UCLA (2–0)	Louisville (1–1)	Louisville (3–1)	Purdue (8–0)	Purdue (9–0)	Purdue (11–0)	Michigan (10–2)	Connecticut (14–1)	Temple (11–2)	Temple (13–2)	Purdue (18–3)	UMass (19–4)	Kansas (21–5)	Louisville (22–4)	Kentucky (23–6)	Louisville (26–5)	10.
11.	Oklahoma State	Indiana (0–0)	Louisville (1–1)	Purdue (5–0)	Purdue (7–0)	Louisville (4–1)	Louisville (5–1)	Louisville (8–1)	Indiana (8–2)	Temple (9–2)	Indiana (11–3)	UMass (16–3)	Michigan (15–4)	Kentucky (18–5)	UMass (21–5)	UMass (23–6)	Kansas (24–6)	Michigan (21–7)	11.
12.	Indiana	California (1–1)	Virginia (0–0)	Indiana (1–1)	Indiana (4–1)	Indiana (5–1)	Arizona (8–1)	Georgia Tech (9–1)	Wisconsin (11–0)	Purdue (14–1)	Louisville (14–2)	Arizona (16–3)	Indiana (14–4)	Missouri (18–2)	Indiana (16–5)	Temple (20–6)	Temple (20–6)	Temple (22–7)	12.
13.	UCLA	Georgia Tech (0–0)	California (2–2)	Syracuse (4–0)	Arizona (4–0)	Arizona (6–0)	Indiana (5–2)	Michigan (7–2)	Temple (7–2)	Louisville (12–2)	Arizona (14–3)	Michigan (13–4)	UMass (17–4)	Temple (17–4)	Louisville (20–4)	Kansas (22–6)	Syracuse (21–5)	Kansas (25–7)	13.
14.	Georgia Tech	UCLA (0–0)	Purdue (3–0)	Arizona (3–0)	Georgia Tech (4–1)	Georgia Tech (6–1)	Connecticut (7–0)	Indiana (7–2)	Connecticut (12–1)	Wisconsin (12–1)	Syracuse (12–2)	Indiana (12–4)	Syracuse (15–3)	Syracuse (16–4)	Purdue (21–4)	Syracuse (19–5)	Louisville (24–5)	Florida (25–7)	14.
15.	Georgetown	Georgetown (0–0)	Minnesota (4–2)	Oklahoma State (4–1)	Minnesota (4–2)	Connecticut (6–0)	Georgia Tech (7–1)	Wisconsin (9–0)	Louisville (10–2)	Michigan (11–3)	Michigan (12–4)	Syracuse (13–3)	Missouri (16–2)	Arizona (19–4)	UCLA (18–3)	UCLA (19–4)	UCLA (20–5)	Syracuse (21–6)	15.
16.	Virginia	Virginia (0–0)	Illinois (2–0)	Illinois (2–0)	Connecticut (5–0)	Minnesota (6–2)	Minnesota (7–2)	Connecticut (10–1)	Syracuse (9–1)	Syracuse (10–2)	Wisconsin (12–2)	Wisconsin (13–3)	Arizona (17–4)	Indiana (15–5)	Florida (21–4)	Saint Louis (22–3)	California (21–6)	California (22–7)	16.
17.	Illinois	Illinois (0–0)	Georgia Tech (3–1)	Minnesota (4–2)	Cincinnati (6–1)	Wisconsin (5–0)	Wisconsin (6–0)	Cincinnati (10–2)	Georgia Tech (9–3)	Georgia Tech (10–4)	Minnesota (13–4)	UAB (16–2)	Saint Louis (18–1)	Florida (19–4)	California (18–5)	Indiana (17–6)	Florida (23–6)	UCLA (21–6)	17.
18.	Arizona	UMass (2–0)	Syracuse (4–0)	Georgia Tech (3–1)	Wisconsin (4–0)	Boston College (6–0)	Cincinnati (8–2)	Syracuse (8–1)	Minnesota (10–3)	UAB (13–1)	Maryland (11–3)	Saint Louis (16–1)	California (14–4)	Saint Louis (19–2)	Syracuse (17–5)	Minnesota (19–9)	Indiana (18–7)	Indiana (19–8)	18.
19.	Cincinnati	Arizona (0–0)	Arizona (3–0)	Wisconsin (2–0)	Illinois (4–1)	Illinois (5–1)	Syracuse (7–1)	Minnesota (8–3)	California (9–2)	Cincinnati (12–3)	West Virginia (12–2)	California (12–4)	UAB (17–3)	California (16–5)	Saint Louis (20–3)	Florida (22–5)	Marquette (22–7)	Oklahoma State (23–9)	19.
20.	Syracuse	Syracuse (0–0)	Vanderbilt (1–0)	Cincinnati (4–1)	Boston College (6–0)	Cincinnati (7–2)	Oklahoma State (7–2)	Boston College (9–2)	Boston College (10–3)	Minnesota (11–4)	UAB (14–2)	Missouri (14–2)	Florida (18–3)	Minnesota (17–7)	Minnesota (18–8)	California (19–6)	Minnesota (20–10)	Texas (25–7)	20.
21.	Purdue	Purdue (0–0)	Indiana (1–1)	Connecticut (3–0)	Syracuse (4–1)	Syracuse (6–1)	George Washington (5–1)	Illinois (7–2)	Cincinnati (11–3)	California (10–3)	Georgia Tech (11–5)	Maryland (12–4)	Wisconsin (14–4)	UAB (18–4)	Boston College (18–7)	Oklahoma State (20–7)	Saint Louis (22–4)	Marquette (22–8)	21.
22.	UMass	Cincinnati (1–1)	George Washington (2–1)	Virginia (2–1)	Oklahoma State (5–2)	Oklahoma State (6–2)	Illinois (6–2)	Vanderbilt (7–2)	UAB (11–1)	Xavier (11–1)	Marquette (11–4)	Minnesota (14–6)	Marquette (15–5)	Marquette (16–6)	Marquette (18–7)	Marquette (20–7)	UAB (22–6)	Nebraska (20–9)	22.
23.	Vanderbilt	George Washington (0–0)	Cincinnati (4–1)	Vanderbilt (3–1)	George Washington (4–1)	George Washington (5–1)	Boston College (7–2)	George Washington (6–2)	West Virginia (8–1)	Saint Louis (14–0)	Saint Louis (14–1)	New Mexico State (16–1)	Minnesota (15–7)	Cincinnati (16–7)	Georgia Tech (14–9)	Boston College (19–8)	Oklahoma State (21–8)	Minnesota (20–11)	23.
24.	George Washington	Vanderbilt (0–0)	Wisconsin (2–0)	George Washington (2–1)	Vanderbilt (4–1)	Marquette (5–2)	Marquette (6–2)	California (7–2)	Vanderbilt (8–3)	West Virginia (10–2)	Missouri (13–2)	Florida (16–3)	Illinois (12–5)	Wisconsin (15–5)	Oklahoma State (18–7)	UAB (20–6) т	Penn (23–2)	Saint Louis (23–5)	24.
25.	Florida State	Wisconsin (0–0)	Georgetown (1–1)	California (2–2)	LSU (3–0)	Western Kentucky (3–1)	Western Kentucky (3–2)	Marquette (7–3)	Missouri (10–1) т Xavier (8–1) т	Maryland (10–3)	New Mexico State (14–1)	Cincinnati (14–5)	Xavier (16–3)	Georgia Tech (13–9)	New Mexico State (19–3) т Penn (19–2) т	Penn (21–2) т	Texas (22–7)	Cincinnati (22–9)	25.
	Preseason	Week 2 Nov. 22	Week 3 Nov. 29	Week 4 Dec. 6	Week 5 Dec. 13	Week 6 Dec. 20	Week 7 Dec. 27	Week 8 Jan. 3	Week 9 Jan. 10	Week 10 Jan. 17	Week 11 Jan. 24	Week 12 Jan. 31	Week 13 Feb. 7	Week 14 Feb. 14	Week 15 Feb. 21	Week 16 Feb. 28	Week 17 Mar. 7	Final Mar. 14	
		Dropped: Florida State (0–0)	None	Dropped: Georgetown (2–2)	Dropped: Virginia; California	Dropped: Vanderbilt; LSU	None	Dropped: Oklahoma State (8–4); Western Kentucky	Dropped: Illinois (7–3); George Washington; Marquette	Dropped: Boston College (11–4); Vanderbilt; Missouri (11–2)	Dropped: Cincinnati (12–5); California (10–4); Xavier	Dropped: West Virginia; Georgia Tech; Marquette (12–5)	Dropped: Maryland; New Mexico State; Cincinnati (15–6)	Dropped: Illinois; Xavier	Dropped: UAB (18–6); Cincinnati (17–8); Wisconsin	Dropped: Georgia Tech; New Mexico State	Dropped: Boston College (20–9)	Dropped: UAB (22–7); Penn (24–2)	

== Coaches Poll ==
	Preseason	Week 2 Nov. 22	Week 3 Nov. 29	Week 4 Dec. 6	Week 5 Dec. 13	Week 6 Dec. 20	Week 7 Dec. 27	Week 8 Jan. 3	Week 9 Jan. 10	Week 10 Jan. 17	Week 11 Jan. 24	Week 12 Jan. 31	Week 13 Feb. 7	Week 14 Feb. 14	Week 15 Feb. 21	Week 16 Feb. 28	Week 17 Mar. 7	Week 18 Mar. 14	Final Apr. 5	
1.	North Carolina	Kentucky (0–0)	Arkansas (3–0)	Arkansas (3–0)	Arkansas (5–0)	Arkansas (6–0)	Arkansas (7–0)	Arkansas (8–0)	North Carolina (12–1)	Kansas (16–1) т	UCLA (13–0)	Duke (15–1)	North Carolina (19–3)	Arkansas (18–2)	Arkansas (20–2)	Arkansas (22–2)	Arkansas (24–2)	Arkansas (25–3)	Arkansas (31–3)	1.
2.	Kentucky	Kansas (2–0)	North Carolina (6–1)	North Carolina (6–1)	North Carolina (7–1)	North Carolina (8–1)	North Carolina (9–1)	North Carolina (10–1)	Duke (9–0)	UCLA (11–0) т	Duke (13–1)	North Carolina (17–3)	Duke (16–2)	Kansas (21–3)	Duke (19–3)	Duke (21–3)	Connecticut (26–3)	North Carolina (27–6)	Duke (28–6)	2.
3.	Duke	Michigan (0–0)	Temple (2–0)	Temple (2–0)	Duke (5–0)	Duke (5–0)	Duke (6–0)	Duke (7–0)	Arkansas (10–1)	North Carolina (13–2)	Kansas (17–2)	UCLA (14–1)	Arkansas (16–2)	Connecticut (21–2)	Connecticut (22–3)	Connecticut (24–3)	Missouri (24–2) т	Connecticut (27–4)	Arizona (29–6)	3.
4.	Arkansas	Duke (0–0)	Michigan (4–0)	Michigan (4–0)	Temple (3–0)	Temple (4–0)	Temple (4–0)	Kentucky (9–1)	Kansas (15–1)	Arkansas (12–1)	North Carolina (14–3)	Kansas (19–2)	Kansas (20–3)	North Carolina (20–4)	North Carolina (21–5)	North Carolina (23–5)	North Carolina (24–6) т	Purdue (26–4)	Florida (29–8)	4.
5.	Michigan	North Carolina (2–0)	Duke (3–0)	Duke (3–0)	Kentucky (3–1)	Kentucky (4–1)	Kentucky (7–1)	Kansas (13–1)	UCLA (9–0)	Duke (11–1)	Arkansas (13–2)	Arkansas (14–2)	Kentucky (18–3)	Duke (17–3)	Kansas (21–5)	Michigan (20–4)	Duke (22–4)	Missouri (25–3)	Purdue (29–5)	5.
6.	Louisville	Arkansas (0–0)	Kentucky (2–1)	Kentucky (2–1)	Kansas (8–1)	Kansas (9–1)	Kansas (11–1)	UCLA (7–0)	Arizona (12–1)	Kentucky (13–2)	Purdue (16–1)	Connecticut (18–1)	Connecticut (19–2)	Louisville (20–2)	Michigan (19–4)	Missouri (22–2)	Arizona (25–4)	Duke (23–5)	Missouri (28–4)	6.
7.	Indiana	Temple (0–0)	Kansas (5–1)	Kansas (5–1)	Michigan (5–1)	UCLA (5–0)	UCLA (6–0)	Temple (6–1)	Kentucky (11–2)	UMass (13–1)	Kentucky (14–3)	Kentucky (16–3)	UCLA (15–2)	UCLA (17–2)	Kentucky (20–5)	Arizona (23–4)	Michigan (20–6)	UMass (27–6)	Connecticut (29–5)	7.
8.	Temple	UCLA (0–0)	Oklahoma State (4–1)	Oklahoma State (4–1)	UCLA (4–0)	Indiana (5–1)	Purdue (9–0)	Purdue (11–0)	Purdue (13–0)	Indiana (10–2)	UMass (15–2)	Purdue (17–2)	Temple (16–2)	Purdue (20–3)	Missouri (20–2)	Kentucky (22–5)	Purdue (25–4)	Kentucky (26–6)	Michigan (24–8)	8.
9.	Kansas	UMass (2–0)	UMass (5–1)	UMass (5–1)	UMass (7–1)	Michigan (5–1)	UMass (7–1)	Arizona (10–1)	UMass (11–1)	Arizona (13–2)	Connecticut (16–1)	Arizona (16–3)	Louisville (18–2)	Temple (17–4)	Temple (19–4)	Louisville (22–4)	Louisville (24–5)	Louisville (26–5)	North Carolina (28–7)	9.
10.	California	Oklahoma State (0–0)	UCLA (2–0)	UCLA (2–0)	Indiana (4–1)	UMass (7–1)	Michigan (5–1)	Indiana (7–2)	Indiana (8–2)	Purdue (14–1)	Indiana (11–3)	Louisville (16–2)	Purdue (18–3)	Kentucky (18–5)	Louisville (20–4)	UMass (23–6)	UMass (24–6)	Arizona (25–5)	Louisville (28–6)	10.
11.	Minnesota	Louisville (0–0)	Purdue (3–0)	Purdue (5–0)	Purdue (7–0)	Purdue (8–0)	Indiana (5–2)	UMass (9–1)	Temple (7–2)	Temple (9–2)	Arizona (14–3)	Indiana (12–4)	Indiana (14–4)	Michigan (17–4)	Arizona (21–4)	Kansas (22–6)	Kansas (24–6)	Michigan (21–7)	Boston College (23–11)	11.
12.	Georgetown	Arizona (0–0)	Indiana (1–1)	Indiana (1–1)	Arizona (4–0)	Arizona (6–0)	Louisville (5–1)	Louisville (8–1)	Wisconsin (11–0)	Connecticut (14–1)	Louisville (14–2)	UMass (16–3)	UMass (17–4)	UMass (19–4)	Purdue (21–4)	Purdue (23–4)	Kentucky (23–6)	Temple (22–7)	Kansas (27–8)	12.
13.	Oklahoma State	Purdue (0–0)	Syracuse (4–0)	Syracuse (4–0)	Louisville (3–1)	Louisville (4–1)	Arizona (8–1)	Georgia Tech (9–1)	Michigan (10–2)	Michigan (11–3)	Temple (11–2)	Temple (13–2)	Michigan (15–4)	Syracuse (16–4)	Indiana (16–5)	Temple (20–6)	Syracuse (21–5)	Kansas (25–7)	Kentucky (27–7)	13.
14.	UCLA	Minnesota (2–0)	Arizona (3–0)	Arizona (3–0)	Georgia Tech (4–1)	Connecticut (6–0)	Connecticut (7–0)	Michigan (7–2)	Connecticut (12–1)	Louisville (12–2)	Syracuse (12–2)	Michigan (13–4)	Syracuse (15–3)	Missouri (18–2)	UMass (21–5)	UCLA (19–4)	Temple (20–6)	Syracuse (21–6)	Syracuse (23–7)	14.
15.	Georgia Tech	California (1–1)	Louisville (1–1)	Louisville (1–1)	Connecticut (5–0)	Georgia Tech (6–1)	Georgia Tech (7–1)	Wisconsin (9–0)	Louisville (10–2)	Wisconsin (12–1)	Michigan (12–4)	Syracuse (13–3)	Arizona (17–4)	Arizona (19–4)	UCLA (18–3)	Syracuse (19–5)	UCLA (20–5)	Florida (25–7)	UMass (28–7)	15.
16.	Illinois	Syracuse (0–0)	Minnesota (4–2)	Minnesota (4–2)	Oklahoma State (5–2)	Minnesota (6–2)	Minnesota (7–2)	Connecticut (10–1)	Syracuse (9–1)	Syracuse (10–2)	Minnesota (13–4)	Wisconsin (13–3)	Missouri (16–2)	Indiana (15–5)	Syracuse (17–5)	Indiana (17–6)	Indiana (18–7)	UCLA (21–6)	Indiana (21–9)	16.
17.	Cincinnati	Georgia Tech (0–0)	Georgia Tech (3–1)	Georgia Tech (3–1)	Cincinnati (6–1)	Oklahoma State (6–2)	Wisconsin (6–0)	Cincinnati (10–2)	Cincinnati (11–3)	Georgia Tech (10–4)	Wisconsin (12–2)	UAB (16–2)	UAB (17–3)	Saint Louis (19–2)	Saint Louis (20–3)	Saint Louis (22–3)	California (21–6)	California (22–7)	Marquette (24–9)	17.
18.	Virginia	Virginia (0–0)	Illinois (2–0)	Illinois (2–0)	Minnesota (4–2)	Syracuse (6–1)	Cincinnati (8–2)	Syracuse (8–1)	Georgia Tech (9–3)	Cincinnati (12–3)	UAB (14–2)	Minnesota (14–6)	Saint Louis (18–1)	California (16–5)	California (18–5)	California (19–6)	Florida (23–6)	Indiana (19–8)	Temple (23–8)	18.
19.	Syracuse	Indiana (0–0)	Cincinnati (4–1)	Cincinnati (4–1)	Wisconsin (4–0)	Illinois (5–1)	Oklahoma State (7–2)	Minnesota (8–3)	Minnesota (10–3)	Minnesota (11–4)	Georgia Tech (11–5)	Cincinnati (14–5)	California (14–4)	Minnesota (17–7)	Florida (21–4)	Florida (22–5)	Minnesota (20–10)	Oklahoma State (23–9)	Tulsa (23–8)	19.
20.	Arizona	Cincinnati (1–1)	Connecticut (3–0)	Connecticut (3–0)	Illinois (4–1)	Wisconsin (5–0)	Syracuse (7–1)	Illinois (7–2)	Boston College (10–3)	UAB (13–1)	Cincinnati (12–5)	Saint Louis (16–1)	Marquette (15–5)	UAB (18–4)	Minnesota (18–8)	Minnesota (19–9)	UAB (22–6)	Minnesota (20–11)	Maryland (18–12)	20.
21.	UMass	Illinois (0–0)	Wisconsin (2–0)	Wisconsin (2–0)	Syracuse (4–1)	Cincinnati (7–2)	Illinois (6–2)	Boston College (9–2)	Oklahoma State (10–4)	Oklahoma State (12–4)	Maryland (11–3)	Maryland (12–4)	Florida (18–3)	Marquette (16–6)	Boston College (18–7)	Marquette (20–7)	Marquette (22–7)	Saint Louis (23–5)	Oklahoma State (24–10)	21.
22.	Wisconsin	Georgetown (0–0)	Virginia (0–0)	Virginia (2–1)	Boston College (6–0)	Boston College (6–0)	George Washington (5–1)	Oklahoma State (8–4)	Illinois (7–3)	Saint Louis (14–0)	Marquette (11–4)	California (12–4)	Wisconsin (14–4)	Florida (19–4)	Marquette (18–7)	Oklahoma State (20–7)	Saint Louis (22–4)	Marquette (22–8)	UCLA (21–7)	22.
23.	Marquette	Vanderbilt (0–0)	George Washington (2–1)	George Washington (2–1)	George Washington (4–1)	George Washington (5–1)	Boston College (7–2)	Marquette (7–3)	Vanderbilt (8–3)	Boston College (11–4)	California (10–4)	Marquette (12–5)	Minnesota (15–7)	Wisconsin (15–5)	UAB (18–6)	Boston College (19–8) т	Oklahoma State (21–8)	UAB (22–7)	Minnesota (21–12)	23.
24.	Florida State	Florida State (0–0)	Florida State (2–0)	Florida State (2–0)	Vanderbilt (4–1)	Marquette (5–2)	Marquette (6–2)	George Washington (6–2)	California (9–2)	California (10–3)	West Virginia (12–2)	Boston College (15–5)	Illinois (12–5)	Cincinnati (16–7)	Cincinnati (17–8)	UAB (20–6) т	Boston College (20–9)	Texas (25–7)	Texas (26–8)	24.
25.	Purdue	Marquette (2–1)	California (2–2)	California (2–2)	LSU (3–0)	Vanderbilt (4–2)	Vanderbilt (5–2)	Vanderbilt (7–2)	UAB (11–1)	Xavier (11–1)	Boston College (13–5)	Missouri (14–2)	Cincinnati (15–6)	Boston College (16–7)	New Mexico State (19–3)	Cincinnati (18–9)	Penn (23–2)	Cincinnati (22–9)	Penn (25–3)	25.
	Preseason	Week 2 Nov. 22	Week 3 Nov. 29	Week 4 Dec. 6	Week 5 Dec. 13	Week 6 Dec. 20	Week 7 Dec. 27	Week 8 Jan. 3	Week 9 Jan. 10	Week 10 Jan. 17	Week 11 Jan. 24	Week 12 Jan. 31	Week 13 Feb. 7	Week 14 Feb. 14	Week 15 Feb. 21	Week 16 Feb. 28	Week 17 Mar. 7	Week 18 Mar. 14	Final Apr. 5	
		Dropped: Wisconsin (0–0)	Dropped: Georgetown (1–1); Vanderbilt (1–0); Marquette	None	Dropped: Virginia; Florida State; California	Dropped: LSU	None	None	Dropped: Marquette; George Washington	Dropped: Illinois; Vanderbilt	Dropped: Oklahoma State; Saint Louis (14–1); Xavier	Dropped: Georgia Tech; West Virginia	Dropped: California; Boston College	Dropped: Illinois	Dropped: Wisconsin	Dropped: New Mexico State	Dropped: Cincinnati	Dropped: Boston College; Penn	Dropped: California (22–8); Saint Louis (23–6); UAB (22–8); Cincinnati (22–10)	
