= 1993–94 UCLA Bruins men's basketball team =

American college basketball season

1993–94 UCLA Bruins men's basketball

NCAA tournament, Round of 64
- Conference: Pacific-10

Ranking
- Coaches: No. 22
- AP: No. 17
- Record: 21–7 (13 – 5, T-2nd Pac-10)
- Head coach: Jim Harrick (6th season)
- Assistant coaches: Mark Gottfried; Steve Lavin; Lorenzo Romar
- Home arena: Pauley Pavilion

1993–94 Pacific-10 Conference men's basketball standings
	Conf.				Overall
Team	W		L	PCT	W		L	PCT
No. 9 Arizona	14	–	4	.778	29	–	6	.829
No. 17 UCLA	13	–	5	.722	21	–	7	.750
No. 16 California	13	–	5	.722	22	–	8	.733
Washington State	10	–	8	.556	20	–	11	.645
Stanford	10	–	8	.556	17	–	11	.607
Arizona State	10	–	8	.556	15	–	13	.536
USC	9	–	9	.500	16	–	12	.571
Oregon	6	–	12	.333	10	–	17	.370
Washington	3	–	15	.167	5	–	22	.185
Oregon State	2	–	16	.111	6	–	21	.222
Rankings from AP Poll

The 1993–94 UCLA Bruins men's basketball team represented the University of California, Los Angeles in the 1993–94 NCAA Division I men's basketball season. Jim Harrick for the sixth year led the Bruins as head coach. UCLA started the season ranked #14 in the AP poll. The Bruins started their season with an excellent 14–0 record. After finishing 2nd in the Pac-10 The Bruins accepted a bid to the NCAA tournament. They were seeded 5th in the Midwest Region, but lost to 12th Seed Tulsa in the first round in a high scoring game, 112–102.

== Starting lineup ==
Position	Player	Class
F	Charles O'Bannon	Fr.
F	Ed O'Bannon	Jr.
F	George Zidek	Jr.
G	Shon Tarver	Sr.
G	Tyus Edney	Jr.

== Roster ==
1993–94 UCLA Bruins men's basketball team
Players
Coaches

Pos.	#	Name	Height	Weight	Year	Hometown
G	12	David Boyle	6 ft 5 in (1.96 m)	—	Sr
G	4	Marquis Burns	6 ft 4 in (1.93 m)	—	So
F	30	Kevin Dempsey	6 ft 6 in (1.98 m)	—	So
G	5	Cameron Dollar	6 ft 1 in (1.85 m)	—	Fr	Atlanta, Georgia
G	11	Tyus Edney	5 ft 10 in (1.78 m)	—	Jr	Gardena, California
F	24	Bob Myers	6 ft 6 in (1.98 m)	—	Fr	Danville, California
C	35	Ike Nwankwo	6 ft 11 in (2.11 m)	—	Fr	Houston, Texas
F	13	Charles O'Bannon	6 ft 6 in (1.98 m)	—	Fr	Bellflower, California
F	31	Ed O'Bannon	6 ft 8 in (2.03 m)	—	Jr	Los Angeles, California
G	21	Shon Tarver (C)	6 ft 6 in (1.98 m)	—	Sr
G		Tom Walden	6 ft 1 in (1.85 m)	—	Fr
C	25	George Zidek	7 ft 0 in (2.13 m)	—	Jr	Gottwaldov, Czechoslovakia
C	14	Rodney Zimmerman (C)	6 ft 9 in (2.06 m)	—	Sr

Head coach

Jim Harrick (Morris Harvey College)

Assistant coach(es)

- Steve Lavin (Chapman)
- Lorenzo Romar (Washington)
- Mark Gottfried (Alabama)

Legend

- (C) Team captain
- (S) Suspended
- (I) Ineligible
- (W) Walk-on
- Injured
- Current redshirt

Roster

== Schedule ==
Date time, TV	Rank^{#}	Opponent^{#}	Result	Record	Site city, state
Regular Season
November 27, 1993*	No. 14	Loyola Marymount	W 115–77	1–0	Pauley Pavilion (6,778); Los Angeles, CA
December 4, 1993*	No. 10	UNLV	W 108–83	2–0	Pauley Pavilion (12,738); Los Angeles, CA
December 8, 1993*	No. 9	Tennessee State	W 80–66	3–0	Pauley Pavilion (7,467); Los Angeles, CA
December 11, 1993*	No. 9	Long Beach State	W 93–51	4–0	Pauley Pavilion (9,206); Los Angeles, CA
December 18, 1993*	No. 9	No. 25 LSU	W 100–80	5–0	Pauley Pavilion (12,164); Los Angeles, CA
December 20, 1993*	No. 9	at Houston	W 93–72	6–0	Hofheinz Pavilion (5,081); Houston, TX
December 28, 1993*	No. 8	vs. North Carolina State	W 81–75	7–0	Greensboro Coliseum (9,100); Greensboro, NC
January 6, 1994	No. 6	Oregon	W 89–73	8–0 (1–0)	Pauley Pavilion (10,116); Los Angeles, CA
January 8, 1994	No. 6	Oregon State	W 104–71	9–0 (2–0)	Pauley Pavilion (8,684); Los Angeles, CA
January 13, 1994	No. 5	at Washington State	W 81–79	10–0 (3–0)	Beasley Coliseum (8,436); Pullman, WA
January 15, 1994	No. 5	at Washington	W 82–62	11–0 (4–0)	Hec Edmundson Pavilion (5,046); Seattle, WA
January 20, 1994	No. 2	No. 9 Arizona	W 74–66	12–0 (5–0)	Pauley Pavilion (12,832); Los Angeles, CA
January 22, 1994	No. 2	Arizona State	W 98–81	13–0 (6–0)	Pauley Pavilion (12,389); Los Angeles, CA
January 27, 1994	No. 1	at Stanford	W 69–65	14–0 (7–0)	Maples Pavilion (7,500); Stanford, CA
January 30, 1994	No. 1	at California	L 70–85	14–1 (7–1)	Oakland Arena (15,039); Oakland, CA
February 3, 1994	No. 4	USC	W 101–72	15–1 (8–1)	Pauley Pavilion (12,623); Los Angeles, CA
February 5, 1994*	No. 4	at Notre Dame	L 63–79	15–2	Edmund P. Joyce Center (11,418); Notre Dame, IN
February 10, 1994	No. 9	Washington	W 79–76	16–2 (9–1)	Pauley Pavilion (10,246); Los Angeles, CA
February 12, 1994	No. 9	Washington State	W 76–66	17–2 (10–1)	Pauley Pavilion (12,017); Los Angeles, CA
February 17, 1994	No. 9	at Arizona State	W 76–70	18–2 (11–1)	Wells Fargo Arena (14,035); Tempe, AZ
February 19, 1994*	No. 8	at No. 15 Arizona	L 74–98	18–3 (11–2)	McKale Center (14,007); Tucson, AZ
February 24, 1994	No. 15	No. 17 California	L 88–92	18–4 (11–3)	Pauley Pavilion (12,761); Los Angeles, CA
February 26, 1994	No. 15	Stanford	W 103–88	19–4 (12–3)	Pauley Pavilion (11,158); Los Angeles, CA
March 3, 1994	No. 15	at USC	L 79–85	19–5 (12–4)	Los Angeles Memorial Sports Arena (9,677); Los Angeles, CA
March 6, 1994*	No. 15	No. 10 Louisville	W 75–72	20–5	Pauley Pavilion (12,243); Los Angeles, CA
March 10, 1994	No. 15	at Oregon State	W 78–67	21–5 (13–4)	Gill Coliseum (6,558); Corvallis, OR
March 12, 1994	No. 15	at Oregon	L 79–80	21–6 (13–5)	McArthur Court (7,630); Eugene, OR
NCAA tournament
March 18, 1994*	No. 17	vs. Tulsa; First Round	L 102–112	21–7	Myriad Convention Center (13,336); Oklahoma City, OK
*Non-conference game. ^{#}Rankings from AP Poll. (#) Tournament seedings in parentheses. All times are in Pacific Time.
