= 1993–94 Alabama Crimson Tide men's basketball team =

American college basketball season

1993–94 Alabama Crimson Tide men's basketball

NCAA tournament, Second round
- Conference: Southeastern Conference
- Record: 20–10 (12–4 SEC)
- Head coach: David Hobbs (2nd season)
- Assistant coach: James Green (2nd season)
- Home arena: Coleman Coliseum

1993–94 Southeastern Conference men's basketball standings
	Conf.				Overall
Team	W		L	PCT	W		L	PCT
East
No. 14 Florida	12	–	4	.750	29	–	8	.784
No. 7 Kentucky †	12	–	4	.750	27	–	7	.794
Vanderbilt	9	–	7	.563	20	–	12	.625
Georgia	7	–	9	.438	14	–	16	.467
South Carolina	4	–	12	.250	9	–	19	.321
Tennessee	2	–	14	.125	5	–	22	.185
West
No. 2 Arkansas	14	–	2	.875	31	–	3	.912
Alabama	12	–	4	.750	20	–	10	.667
Mississippi State	9	–	7	.563	18	–	11	.621
Ole Miss	7	–	9	.438	14	–	13	.519
LSU	5	–	11	.313	11	–	16	.407
Auburn	3	–	13	.188	11	–	17	.393
† 1994 SEC tournament winner Rankings from AP Poll

The 1993–94 Alabama Crimson Tide men's basketball team represented the University of Alabama in the 1992-93 NCAA Division I men's basketball season. The team's head coach was David Hobbs, who was in his second season at Alabama. The team played their home games at Coleman Coliseum in Tuscaloosa, Alabama. They finished the season with a record of 20–10, with a conference record of 12–4, good enough for second place in the SEC Western Division.

Senior guard James "Hollywood" Robinson and junior forward Jason Caffey were joined by Jamal Faulkner, a junior transfer from Arizona State. Key freshman signees were forward-center Antonio McDyess and guard Eric Washington.

The Tide reached the semifinal of the 1994 SEC men's basketball tournament final, but lost to Florida. The Tide earned an at-large bid to the 1994 NCAA tournament, defeating Providence in the first round and losing to Purdue.

== Roster ==
1993–94 Alabama Crimson Tide men's basketball team
Players
Coaches

Pos.	#	Name	Height	Weight	Year	Previous school	Hometown
G	20	James Robinson	6 ft 2 in (1.88 m)	—	Sr	Murrah High School	Jackson, Mississippi
F	35	Jason Caffey	6 ft 8 in (2.03 m)	—	Jr	Davidson High School	Mobile, Alabama
C	51	Cedric Moore	6 ft 9 in (2.06 m)	—	Jr	Woodlawn High School	Birmingham, Alabama
F	30	Jamal Faulkner	6 ft 7 in (2.01 m)	—	Jr	Christ the King HS/Arizona St.	Brooklyn, New York
C	24	Antonio McDyess	6 ft 9 in (2.06 m)	—	Fr	Quitman High School	Quitman, Mississippi
C	50	Roy Rogers	6 ft 10 in (2.08 m)	—	So	Linden High School	Linden, Alabama
G	15	Marvin Orange	6 ft 0 in (1.83 m)	—	So	Irmo High School	Irmo, South Carolina
F		Shon Peck-Love	6 ft 5 in (1.96 m)	—	Sr	Three Rivers CC, Missouri	Tuscaloosa, Alabama
G	22	Bryan Passink	6 ft 3 in (1.91 m)	—	Fr	Benedictine Military School	Savannah, Georgia
G	14	Eric Washington	6 ft 4 in (1.93 m)	—	Fr	Pearl High School	Pearl, Mississippi
G	25	Artie Griffin	6 ft 3 in (1.91 m)	—	Jr	South Plains JC, Texas	San Antonio, Texas
G		Walter Pitts	6 ft 2 in (1.88 m)	—	Fr	Loachapoka High School	Loachapoka, Alabama
G		Anthony Brown	6 ft 5 in (1.96 m)	—	Fr

Head coach

- David Hobbs

Assistant coach(es)

Legend

- (C) Team captain
- (S) Suspended
- (I) Ineligible
- (W) Walk-on
- Injured
- Current redshirt

== Schedule and results ==
Date time, TV	Rank^{#}	Opponent^{#}	Result	Record	Site city, state
Regular Season
December 1, 1993*		Chattanooga	L 57–67	0–1	Coleman Coliseum; Tuscaloosa, Alabama
December 4, 1993*		Washington State	L 70–76	0–2	Coleman Coliseum; Tuscaloosa, Alabama
December 9, 1993*		Northwestern State	W 85–84	1–2	Coleman Coliseum; Tuscaloosa, Alabama
December 18, 1993*		Florida A&M	W 96–58	2–2	Coleman Coliseum; Tuscaloosa, Alabama
December 21, 1993*		at Southern Miss	L 62–79	2–3	Reed Green Coliseum; Hattiesburg, Mississippi
December 28, 1993*		Delaware State	W 82–44	3–3	North Charleston Coliseum; North Charleston, South Carolina
December 29, 1993*		at Charleston	L 60–82	3–4	North Charleston Coliseum; North Charleston, South Carolina
January 5, 1994		at South Carolina	L 66–82	3–5 (0–1)	Carolina Coliseum; Columbia, South Carolina
January 8, 1994		No. 1 Arkansas	W 66–64	4–5 (1–1)	Coleman Coliseum; Tuscaloosa, Alabama
January 12, 1994		No. 24 Vanderbilt	W 73–67	5–5 (2–1)	Coleman Coliseum; Tuscaloosa, Alabama
January 15, 1994		at Ole Miss	L 54–70	5–6 (2–2)	Tad Smith Coliseum; Oxford, Mississippi
January 17, 1994*		UT Martin	W 104–68	6–6	Coleman Coliseum; Tuscaloosa, Alabama
January 19, 1994		at LSU	W 71–67	7–6 (3–2)	Maravich Assembly Center; Baton Rouge, Louisiana
January 22, 1994		Florida	W 69–61	8–6 (4–2)	Coleman Coliseum; Tuscaloosa, Alabama
January 25, 1994		at Auburn	W 74–69	9–6 (5–2)	Memorial Coliseum; Auburn, Alabama
January 29, 1994		Mississippi State	W 70–69	10–6 (6–2)	Coleman Coliseum; Tuscaloosa, Alabama
February 2, 1994		at No. 7 Kentucky	L 67–82	10–7 (6–3)	Rupp Arena; Lexington, Kentucky
February 5, 1994		at Georgia	W 78–77	11–7 (7–3)	Stegeman Coliseum; Athens, Georgia
February 8, 1994		LSU	W 75–66	12–7 (8–3)	Coleman Coliseum; Tuscaloosa, Alabama
February 14, 1994*		Mercer	W 88–63	13–7	Coleman Coliseum; Tuscaloosa, Alabama
February 16, 1994		at No. 1 Arkansas	L 81–102	13–8 (8–4)	Bud Walton Arena; Fayetteville, Arkansas
February 19, 1994		Tennessee	W 84–70	14–8 (9–4)	Coleman Coliseum; Tuscaloosa, Alabama
February 23, 1994*		Tennessee State	W 66–62	15–8	Coleman Coliseum; Tuscaloosa, Alabama
February 26, 1994		Ole Miss	W 83–62	16–8 (10–4)	Coleman Coliseum; Tuscaloosa, Alabama
March 2, 1994		at Mississippi State	W 60–49	17–8 (11–4)	Humphrey Coliseum; Starkville, Mississippi
March 5, 1994		Auburn	W 83–68	18–8 (12–4)	Coleman Coliseum; Tuscaloosa, Alabama
SEC Tournament
March 11, 1994		Auburn; Second Round	W 83–55	19–8	Pyramid Arena; Memphis, Tennessee
March 12, 1994		No. 17 Florida; Semifinals	L 52–68	19–9	Pyramid Arena; Memphis, Tennessee
NCAA Tournament
March 17, 1994*	(9 SE)	(8 SE) Providence; First Round	W 76–70	20–9	Rupp Arena; Lexington, Kentucky
March 19, 1994*	(9 SE)	(1 SE) No. 3 Purdue; Second Round	L 73–83	20–10	Rupp Arena; Lexington, Kentucky
*Non-conference game. ^{#}Rankings from AP poll. (#) Tournament seedings in parentheses. SE=Southeast. All times are in Central Time.
