= 1982–83 Ohio Bobcats men's basketball team =

American college basketball season

1982–83 Ohio Bobcats men's basketball

MAC tournament champions

NCAA tournament, Second Round
- Conference: Mid-American Conference
- Record: 23–9 (12–6 MAC)
- Head coach: Danny Nee (3rd season)
- Home arena: Convocation Center

1982–83 Mid-American Conference men's basketball standings
	Conf.				Overall
Team	W		L	PCT	W		L	PCT
Bowling Green	15	–	3	.833	21	–	9	.700
Ohio†	12	–	6	.667	23	–	9	.719
Toledo	10	–	8	.556	17	–	12	.586
Ball State	10	–	8	.556	17	–	12	.586
Miami	10	–	8	.556	13	–	15	.464
Kent State	9	–	9	.500	15	–	13	.536
Eastern Michigan	8	–	10	.444	12	–	16	.429
Northern Illinois	8	–	10	.444	11	–	16	.407
Central Michigan	5	–	13	.278	10	–	17	.370
Western Michigan	3	–	15	.167	5	–	23	.179
† Mid-American Conference tournament winner Rankings from AP Poll

The 1982–83 Ohio Bobcats men's basketball team represented Ohio University as a member of the Mid-American Conference in the college basketball season of 1982–83. The team was coached by Danny Nee in his third season at Ohio. They played their home games at Convocation Center. The Bobcats finished with a record of 23–9 and second in the MAC regular season with a conference record of 12–6. They won the MAC tournament with wins over Eastern Michigan, Toledo, and MAC regular season champion Bowling Green. John Devereaux was named the tournament MVP. They received a bid to the NCAA tournament. There they defeated Illinois State before losing to Kentucky in the second round. 23 wins was the school record at the time.

== Schedule ==
Date time, TV	Rank^{#}	Opponent^{#}	Result	Record	Site (attendance) city, state
Regular Season
11/26/1982*		vs. St. Mary's (CA); Joe Lapchick Tournament	W 57–54	1–0	
11/27/1982*		vs. No. 19 St. John's; Joe Lapchick Tournament	L 52–62	1–1	
12/2/1982*		Marietta	W 90–68	2–1	
12/10/1982*		at Providence; Fleet Basketball Classic	W 48–47	3–1	
12/11/1982*		vs. Rhode Island; Fleet Basketball Classic	W 67–65 ^{OT}	4–1	
12/15/1982*		at Niagara	L 69–71 ^{OT}	4–2	
12/29/1982*		Brooklyn	W 58–43	5–2	
MAC regular season
1/5/1983		Toledo	W 71–52	6–1 (1–0)	
1/8/1983		at Northern Illinois	W 62–57	7–1 (2–0)	
1/12/1983		Kent State	W 68–63	8–1 (3–0)	
1/15/1983		at Miami (OH)	L 60–73	8–2 (3–1)	
1/19/1983		Western Michigan	W 82–55	9–2 (4–1)	
1/22/1983		at Ball State	W 73–62	10–2 (5–1)	
1/26/1983		at Central Michigan	W 77–72	11-2 (6–1)	
1/29/1983		Bowling Green	L 55–72	11-3 (6–2)	
1/31/1983*		Radford	W 68–50	12–3	
2/2/1983		at Eastern Michigan	W 72–57	13–3 (7–2)	
2/5/1983		Northern Illinois	W 59–45	14–3 (8–2)	
2/9/1983		at Kent State	W 73–71	15–3 (9–2)	
2/12/1983		Miami (OH)	L 51–53	15–4 (9–3)	
2/14/1983*		DePaul	W 63–62 ^{2OT}	16–4	
2/16/1983		at Western Michigan	L 59–65	16–5 (9–4)	
2/19/1983		Ball State	W 62–48	17–5 (10–4)	
2/23/1983		Central Michigan	W 87–63	18–5 (11–4)	
2/26/1983		at Bowling Green	L 75–89	18–6 (11–5)	
3/2/1983		Eastern Michigan	W 62–60	19–6 (12–5)	
3/5/1983		at Toledo	L 56–59	19–7 (12–6)	
MAC tournament
3/8/1983		Eastern Michigan; Quarterfinals	W 74–60	20–7 (13–6)	
3/10/1983		Toledo; Semifinals	W 70–59	21–7 (14–6)	
3/12/1983		at Bowling Green; Championship	W 59–56	22–7 (15–6)	
NCAA tournament
3/17/1983*		vs. Illinois State; Mideast Regional First Round	W 51–49	23–7	
3/19/1983*		vs. No. 12 Kentucky; Mideast Regional Second Round	L 40–57	23–8	
*Non-conference game. ^{#}Rankings from AP Poll. (#) Tournament seedings in parentheses. All times are in Eastern Time.

== Statistics ==
=== Team statistics ===
Final 1982–83 statistics

Record	Ohio	OPP
Scoring	2070	1919
Scoring Average	64.69	59.97
Field goals – Att	820–1679	735–1696
Free throws – Att	430–664	449–646
Rebounds	1160	954
Assists	440	
Turnovers	440	389
Steals		
Blocked Shots	138	71

=== Player statistics ===
			Minutes		Scoring		Total FGs			Free-Throws			Rebounds						
Player	GP	GS	Tot	Avg	Pts	Avg	FG	FGA	Pct	FT	FTA	Pct	Tot	Avg	A	PF	TO	Stl	Blk
John Devereaux	32		1024	32.0	453	14.2	181	353	0.513	91	123	0.740	312	9.8	43	104	53		99
Vic Alexander	31		801	25.8	344	11.1	145	282	0.514	54	104	0.519	170	5.5	13	91	67		19
Jeff Thomas	32		1097	34.3	313	9.8	138	291	0.474	37	52	0.712	94	2.9	118	61	65		6
Eric Hilton	32		736	23.0	255	8.0	96	182	0.527	63	96	0.656	68	2.1	81	55	67		2
Eddie Hicks	32		867	27.1	189	5.9	70	145	0.483	49	79	0.620	125	3.9	45	81	44		6
Nate Cole	31		491	15.8	167	5.4	64	128	0.500	39	51	0.765	83	2.7	18	53	31		1
Robert Tatum	29		536	18.5	137	4.7	51	110	0.464	35	46	0.761	43	1.5	52	39	23		1
Rick Scarberry	24		220	9.2	71	3.0	29	85	0.341	13	16	0.813	17	0.7	6	15	9		1
Paul Baron	24		276	11.5	46	1.9	14	30	0.467	18	41	0.439	35	1.5	35	46	27		0
Steve Becvar	20		152	8.5	32	1.8	12	28	0.429	8	13	0.615	21	2.2	14	14	17		0
Sean Carlson	17		144	7.6	31	1.6	12	22	0.545	7	19	0.368	37	1.1	9	20	18		3
David Kowalski	17		123	7.2	21	1.2	5	18	0.278	11	17	0.647	6	0.4	6	25	14		0
Mike Paxson	9		33	3.7	11	1.2	3	5	0.600	5	7	0.714	7	0.8	7	2	5		0
Total	32	-		-	2070	64.7	820	1679	0.488	430	664	0.648	1160	36.3	440	611	440		138
Opponents	32	-	0	-	1919	60.0	735	1696	0.433	449	646	0.695	954	29.8		579	389		71

Legend
GP	Games played	GS	Games started	Avg	Average per game
FG	Field-goals made	FGA	Field-goal attempts	Off	Offensive rebounds
Def	Defensive rebounds	A	Assists	TO	Turnovers
Blk	Blocks	Stl	Steals	High	Team high
