= 1993–94 Missouri Tigers men's basketball team =

American college basketball season

1993–94 Missouri Tigers men's basketball

Big Eight Regular-Season Champions

NCAA tournament, Elite Eight
- Conference: Big Eight Conference

Ranking
- Coaches: No. 6
- AP: No. 5
- Record: 28–4 (14–0 Big 8)
- Head coach: Norm Stewart (27th season)
- Assistant coaches: Kim Anderson (3rd season); Rich Daly (11th season); Lee Winfield (2nd season)
- Captain: Lamont Frazier
- Home arena: Hearnes Center

1993–94 Big Eight Conference men's basketball standings
	Conf.				Overall
Team	W		L	PCT	W		L	PCT
No. 5 Missouri	14	–	0	1.000	28	–	4	.875
No. 19 Oklahoma State	10	–	4	.714	24	–	10	.706
No. 13 Kansas	9	–	5	.643	27	–	8	.771
No. 22 Nebraska †	7	–	7	.500	20	–	10	.667
Oklahoma	6	–	8	.429	15	–	13	.536
Kansas State	4	–	10	.286	20	–	14	.588
Iowa State	4	–	10	.286	14	–	13	.519
Colorado	2	–	12	.143	10	–	17	.370
† 1994 Big Eight tournament winner As of April 4, 1994; Rankings from AP poll

The 1993–94 Missouri Tigers men's basketball team represented the University of Missouri as a member of the Big Eight Conference during the 1993–94 NCAA men's basketball season. Led by head coach Norm Stewart, the Tigers won the Big Eight Conference regular season title by sweeping through the league schedule. Though upset by Nebraska in the Big Eight tournament semifinals, the Tigers were awarded the #1 seed in the West region of the NCAA tournament. After reaching the Elite Eight, Arizona defeated the Tigers 92–72 in the regional final. Missouri finished with an overall record of 28–4 (14–0 Big Eight).

== Roster ==
1993–94 Missouri Tigers men's basketball team
Players
Coaches

Pos.	#	Name	Height	Weight	Year	Hometown
G	3	Mark Atkins	6 ft 6 in (1.98 m)	230 lb (104 kg)	Sr	Gary, Indiana
G	15	Melvin Booker	6 ft 1 in (1.85 m)	185 lb (84 kg)	Sr	Moss Point, Mississippi
F	0	Jevon Crudup	6 ft 9 in (2.06 m)	222 lb (101 kg)	Sr	Kansas City, Missouri
F	53	Derek Dunham	6 ft 7 in (2.01 m)	247 lb (112 kg)	Sr	Jerseyville, Illinois
F	21	Marlo Finner	6 ft 6 in (1.98 m)	229 lb (104 kg)	Jr	Chicago, Illinois
G/F	22	Lamont Frazier	6 ft 4 in (1.93 m)	237 lb (108 kg)	Sr	Charleston, Missouri
G	25	Jed Frost	6 ft 1 in (1.85 m)	188 lb (85 kg)	Sr	Kansas City, Missouri
F	42	Derek Grimm	6 ft 9 in (2.06 m)	207 lb (94 kg)	Fr	Morton, Illinois
C	41	Chris Heller	6 ft 10 in (2.08 m)	226 lb (103 kg)	RS Sr	Kansas City, Missouri
G	11	Derrick Johnson	6 ft 1 in (1.85 m)	180 lb (82 kg)	RS So	Jefferson City, Missouri
G	4	Reggie Smith	6 ft 2 in (1.88 m)	202 lb (92 kg)	Sr	Myrtle Beach, South Carolina
G	5	Jason Sutherland	6 ft 1 in (1.85 m)	186 lb (84 kg)	So	Watertown, South Dakota
F	33	Kelly Thames	6 ft 7 in (2.01 m)	212 lb (96 kg)	So	St. Louis, Missouri
G	10	Chip Walther	5 ft 10 in (1.78 m)	166 lb (75 kg)	RS Fr	St. Louis, Missouri
G/F	13	Julian Winfield	6 ft 5 in (1.96 m)	185 lb (84 kg)	So	St. Louis, Missouri

Head coach

- Norm Stewart (Missouri)

Assistant coach(es)

Legend

- (C) Team captain
- (S) Suspended
- (I) Ineligible
- (W) Walk-on
- Injured
- Current redshirt

== Schedule and results ==
Date time, TV	Rank^{#}	Opponent^{#}	Result	Record	Site (attendance) city, state
Regular Season
Nov 27, 1993*		Central Missouri State	W 69–66	1–0	Hearnes Center; Columbia, MO
Dec 2, 1993*		at No. 2 Arkansas	L 68–120	1–1	Bud Walton Arena (20,212); Fayetteville, AR
Dec 4, 1993*		Jackson State	W 80–76	2–1	Hearnes Center; Columbia, MO
Dec 6, 1993*		Arkansas State	W 80–58	3–1	Hearnes Center; Columbia, MO
Dec 11, 1993*		SMU	W 82–77	4–1	Hearnes Center; Columbia, MO
Dec 19, 1993*		Coppin State	W 64–63	5–1	Hearnes Center; Columbia, MO
Dec 22, 1993*		vs. No. 19 Illinois; Braggin' Rights	W 108–107 ^{3OT}	6–1	St. Louis Arena (18,273); St. Louis, MO
Dec 30, 1993*		Mercer	W 75–56	7–1	Hearnes Center; Columbia, MO
Jan 2, 1994*		Washington	W 85–71	8–1	Hearnes Center; Columbia, MO
Jan 5, 1994*		at Southern Illinois	W 72–56	9–1	SIU Arena; Carbondale, IL
Jan 8, 1994		Kansas State	W 63–43	10–1 (1–0)	Hearnes Center; Columbia, MO
Jan 12, 1994*	No. 25	at Notre Dame	L 73–77	10–2	Joyce Center; South Bend, IN
Jan 15, 1994	No. 25	at Colorado	W 80–72	11–2 (2–0)	Coors Events Center; Boulder, CO
Jan 19, 1994		Iowa State	W 92–69	12–2 (3–0)	Hearnes Center; Columbia, Missouri
Jan 22, 1994		at Oklahoma State	W 73–68	13–2 (4–0)	Gallagher-Iba Arena; Stillwater, OK
Jan 24, 1994	No. 24	at Nebraska	W 89–73	14–2 (5–0)	Devaney Center; Lincoln, NE
Jan 31, 1994	No. 20	No. 3 Kansas	W 79–67	15–2 (6–0)	Hearnes Center; Columbia, MO
Feb 5, 1994	No. 20	at Oklahoma	W 104–94	16–2 (7–0)	Lloyd Noble Center; Norman, OK
Feb 9, 1994	No. 15	Colorado	W 82–70	17–2 (8–0)	Hearnes Center; Columbia, MO
Feb 12, 1994	No. 15	Oklahoma State	W 72–70	18–2 (9–0)	Hearnes Center; Columbia, MO
Feb 16, 1994	No. 12	at Iowa State	W 79–72 ^{OT}	19–2 (10–0)	Hilton Coliseum; Ames, IA
Feb 20, 1994	No. 12	at No. 4 Kansas	W 81–74	20–2 (11–0)	Allen Fieldhouse; Lawrence, KS
Feb 23, 1994*	No. 6	Southeast Missouri State	W 83–61	21–2	Hearnes Center; Columbia, MO
Feb 25, 1994	No. 6	Oklahoma	W 99–63	22–2 (12–0)	Hearnes Center; Columbia, MO
March 2, 1994	No. 6	at Kansas State	W 68–57	23–2 (13–0)	Bramlage Coliseum; Manhattan, KS
Mar 5, 1994	No. 6	Nebraska	W 80–78	24–2 (14–0)	Hearnes Center; Columbia, MO
Big Eight Tournament
Mar 11, 1994*	No. 3	vs. Colorado; Quarterfinal	W 64–62	25–2	Kemper Arena; Kansas City, MO
Mar 12, 1994*	No. 3	vs. Nebraska; Semifinal	L 91–98	25–3	Kemper Arena; Kansas City, MO
NCAA Tournament
Mar 17, 1994*	(1 W) No. 5	vs. (16 W) Navy; First Round	W 76–53	26–3	Dee Events Center; Logan, UT
Mar 19, 1994*	(1 W) No. 5	vs. (9 W) Wisconsin; Second Round	W 109–96	27–3	Dee Events Center; Logan, UT
Mar 24, 1994*	(1 W) No. 5	vs. (4 W) No. 15 Syracuse; Sweet Sixteen	W 98–88 ^{OT}	28–3	L.A. Sports Arena; Los Angeles, CA
Mar 26, 1994*	(1 W) No. 5	vs. (2 W) No. 9 Arizona; Elite Eight	L 72–92	28–4	L.A. Sports Arena; Los Angeles, CA
*Non-conference game. ^{#}Rankings from AP. (#) Tournament seedings in parentheses. W=West. All times are in Central.

== Rankings ==
Ranking movements Legend: ██ Increase in ranking ██ Decrease in ranking — = Not ranked
	Week																		
Poll	Pre	1	2	3	4	5	6	7	8	9	10	11	12	13	14	15	16	17	Final
AP	—	—	—	—	—	—	—	—	25	—	24	20	15	12	6	6	3	5	Not released
Coaches	—	—	—	—	—	—	—	—	—	—	—	25	16	14	8	6	3	5	6

== Awards ==
- Melvin Booker – Big Eight Player of the Year, First-team All-Big Eight, Consensus Second-team All-American
