= 1983 MAC men's basketball tournament =

- Classification: Division I
- Season: 1982–83
- Teams: 7
- First round site: Campus Arenas; Campus Sites
- Finals site: Anderson Arena; Bowling Green, Ohio
- Champions: Ohio (1st title)
- Winning coach: Danny Nee (1st title)
- MVP: John Devereaux (Ohio)
- MAC men's basketball tournaments

1982–83 Mid-American Conference men's basketball standings
	Conf.				Overall
Team	W		L	PCT	W		L	PCT
Bowling Green	15	–	3	.833	21	–	9	.700
Ohio†	12	–	6	.667	23	–	9	.719
Toledo	10	–	8	.556	17	–	12	.586
Ball State	10	–	8	.556	17	–	12	.586
Miami	10	–	8	.556	13	–	15	.464
Kent State	9	–	9	.500	15	–	13	.536
Eastern Michigan	8	–	10	.444	12	–	16	.429
Northern Illinois	8	–	10	.444	11	–	16	.407
Central Michigan	5	–	13	.278	10	–	17	.370
Western Michigan	3	–	15	.167	5	–	23	.179
† Mid-American Conference tournament winner Rankings from AP Poll

The 1983 MAC men's basketball tournament was held March 10–12 at various MAC basketball areans. Second seeded Ohio defeated top-seeded Bowling Green in the championship game by the score of 74–64 to win their first MAC men's basketball tournament and a bid to the NCAA tournament. There they defeated Illinois State before losing to Kentucky in the second round. John Devereaux of Ohio was named the tournament MVP.

== Format ==
Seven of the ten MAC teams participated. Games were played on the home court of the better seeded team. The final was played at Anderson Arena in Bowling Green, Ohio.

== Bracket ==
Quarterfinals; March 10
5	Miami (OH)	79
4	Ball State	85
3	Toledo	79
6	Kent State	64
7	Eastern Michigan	60
2	Ohio	74

Semifinals; March 11
1	Bowling Green	79
4	Ball State	69
3	Toledo	59
2	Ohio	70

Final; March 12
1	Bowling Green	56
2	Ohio	59
