= 1993–94 Nebraska Cornhuskers men's basketball team =

American college basketball season

1993–94 Nebraska Cornhuskers men's basketball

Big Eight tournament champions

NCAA tournament
- Conference: Big Eight Conference

Ranking
- AP: No. 22
- Record: 20–10 (7–7 Big Eight)
- Head coach: Danny Nee (8th season)
- Assistant coaches: Gary Bargen; Jeff Smith; Jimmy Williams
- Home arena: Bob Devaney Sports Center

1993–94 Big Eight Conference men's basketball standings
	Conf.				Overall
Team	W		L	PCT	W		L	PCT
No. 5 Missouri	14	–	0	1.000	28	–	4	.875
No. 19 Oklahoma State	10	–	4	.714	24	–	10	.706
No. 13 Kansas	9	–	5	.643	27	–	8	.771
No. 22 Nebraska †	7	–	7	.500	20	–	10	.667
Oklahoma	6	–	8	.429	15	–	13	.536
Kansas State	4	–	10	.286	20	–	14	.588
Iowa State	4	–	10	.286	14	–	13	.519
Colorado	2	–	12	.143	10	–	17	.370
† 1994 Big Eight tournament winner As of April 4, 1994; Rankings from AP poll

The 1993–94 Nebraska Cornhuskers men's basketball team represented the University of Nebraska–Lincoln during the 1993–94 college basketball season. Led by head coach Danny Nee (8th season), the Cornhuskers competed in the Big Eight Conference and played their home games at the Bob Devaney Sports Center. They finished with a record of 20–10 overall and 7–7 in Big Eight Conference play. Nebraska won the Big Eight tournament to earn an automatic bid to the 1994 NCAA tournament as the #6 seed in the East region.

== Roster ==
1993–94 Nebraska Cornhuskers men's basketball team
Players
Coaches

Pos.	#	Name	Height	Weight	Year	Previous school	Hometown
F	3	Chad Jaeger	6 ft 7 in (2.01 m)	201 lb (91 kg)	So	Lexington	Lexington, NE
G	12	Jamar Johnson	6 ft 0 in (1.83 m)	180 lb (82 kg)	Sr	Concord	Elkhart, IN
G	20	Chris Newton	6 ft 1 in (1.85 m)	175 lb (79 kg)	So	Milford	Milford, NE
G	21	Erick Strickland	6 ft 3 in (1.91 m)	200 lb (91 kg)	So	Bellevue West	Bellevue, NE
G	24	Jaron Boone	6 ft 6 in (1.98 m)	180 lb (82 kg)	So	Skyline	Salt Lake City, UT
G	30	Jason Glock	6 ft 5 in (1.96 m)	190 lb (86 kg)	So	Wahoo	Wahoo, NE
C	32	Mikki Moore	6 ft 11 in (2.11 m)	195 lb (88 kg)	Fr	Blacksburg	Gaffney, SC
F	33	Tom Best	6 ft 8 in (2.03 m)	235 lb (107 kg)	Sr	Thornwood	South Holland, IL
F	34	Melvin Brooks	6 ft 8 in (2.03 m)	235 lb (107 kg)	Jr	Northeastern	Elizabeth City, NC
F	41	Bruce Chubick	6 ft 7 in (2.01 m)	215 lb (98 kg)	Sr	West Holt	Atkinson, NE
F	43	Terrance Badgett	6 ft 6 in (1.98 m)	205 lb (93 kg)	So	Omaha South	Omaha, NE
G	52	Eric Piatkowski	6 ft 7 in (2.01 m)	215 lb (98 kg)	Sr	Stevens	Rapid City, SD

Head coach

Danny Nee

Assistant coach(es)

- Gary Bargen
- Jeff Smith
- Jimmy Williams

Legend

- (C) Team captain
- (S) Suspended
- (I) Ineligible
- (W) Walk-on
- Injured
- Current redshirt

Roster
Last update: March 29, 2020

== Schedule and results ==
Date time, TV	Rank^{#}	Opponent^{#}	Result	Record	Site city, state
Regular season
Nov 27, 1993*		at Texas-San Antonio	W 96–85	1–0	Convocation Center; San Antonio, Texas
Nov 28, 1993*		Texas	L 75–78	1–1	Bob Devaney Sports Center; Lincoln, Nebraska
Dec 1, 1993*		at Appalachian State	L 82–91	1–2	Varsity Gymnasium; Boone, North Carolina
Dec 3, 1993*		Ohio; Ameritas Classic	W 94–68	2–2	Bob Devaney Sports Center; Lincoln, Nebraska
Dec 4, 1993*		Portland; Ameritas Classic	W 111–85	3–2	Bob Devaney Sports Center; Lincoln, Nebraska
Dec 9, 1993*		at Creighton; Rivalry	W 67–53	4–2	Omaha Civic Auditorium; Omaha, Nebraska
Dec 11, 1993*		Wichita State	W 94–72	5–2	Bob Devaney Sports Center; Lincoln, Nebraska
Dec 18, 1993*		at Michigan State	W 85–81	6–2	Breslin Student Events Center; East Lansing, Michigan
Dec 20, 1993*		Florida A&M	W 86–61	7–2	Bob Devaney Sports Center; Lincoln, Nebraska
Dec 31, 1993*		Northern Iowa	W 70–63	8–2	Bob Devaney Sports Center; Lincoln, Nebraska
Jan 3, 1994		at Iowa State	W 78–72	9–2 (1–0)	Hilton Coliseum; Ames, Iowa
Jan 5, 1994*		Southern Utah	W 89–85	10–2	Bob Devaney Sports Center; Lincoln, Nebraska
Jan 8, 1994		Colorado	W 106–67	11–2 (2–0)	Bob Devaney Sports Center; Lincoln, Nebraska
Jan 15, 1994*		Missouri-Kansas City	W 92–71	12–2	Bob Devaney Sports Center; Lincoln, Nebraska
Jan 19, 1994		at Colorado	L 81–86	12–3 (2–1)	CU Events/Conference Center; Boulder, Colorado
Jan 24, 1994		No. 24 Missouri	L 73–89	12–4 (2–2)	Bob Devaney Sports Center; Lincoln, Nebraska
Jan 29, 1994		Oklahoma	L 76–79	12–5 (2–3)	Bob Devaney Sports Center; Lincoln, Nebraska
Feb 6, 1994		at No. 3 Kansas	L 87–94	12–6 (2–4)	Allen Fieldhouse; Lawrence, Kansas
Feb 9, 1994		at Kansas State	W 76–68	13–6 (3–4)	Bramlage Coliseum; Manhattan, Kansas
Feb 12, 1994		Iowa State	W 102–96	14–6 (4–4)	Bob Devaney Sports Center; Lincoln, Nebraska
Feb 14, 1994		at Oklahoma	L 111–115 ^{OT}	14–7 (4–5)	Lloyd Noble Center; Norman, Oklahoma
Feb 19, 1994		at Oklahoma State	L 80–98	14–8 (4–6)	Gallagher-Iba Arena; Stillwater, Oklahoma
Feb 23, 1994		No. 10 Kansas	W 96–87	15–8 (5–6)	Bob Devaney Sports Center; Lincoln, Nebraska
Feb 26, 1994		Kansas State	W 86–77	16–8 (6–6)	Bob Devaney Sports Center; Lincoln, Nebraska
Mar 2, 1994		No. 21 Oklahoma State	W 89–81	17–8 (7–6)	Bob Devaney Sports Center; Lincoln, Nebraska
Mar 5, 1994		at No. 6 Missouri	L 78–80	17–9 (7–7)	Hearnes Center; Columbia, Missouri
Big Eight tournament
Mar 11, 1994*		vs. Oklahoma; Big Eight tournament Quarterfinal	W 105–88	18–9	Kemper Arena; Kansas City, Missouri
Mar 12, 1994*		vs. No. 3 Missouri; Big Eight tournament Semifinal	W 98–91	19–9	Kemper Arena; Kansas City, Missouri
Mar 13, 1994*		vs. No. 23 Oklahoma State; Big Eight tournament championship	W 77–68	20–9	Kemper Arena; Kansas City, Missouri
NCAA Tournament
Mar 17, 1994*	(6 E) No. 22	vs. (11 E) Penn; First Round	L 80–90	20–10	Nassau Coliseum; Uniondale, New York
*Non-conference game. ^{#}Rankings from AP poll. (#) Tournament seedings in parentheses. E=East. All times are in Central Time.
