= 1994 Big Eight Conference men's basketball tournament =

- Classification: Division I
- Season: 1993–94
- Teams: 8
- Finals site: Kemper Arena; Kansas City, MO
- Champions: Nebraska (1st title)
- Winning coach: Danny Nee (1st title)
- MVP: Eric Piatkowski (Nebraska)

1993–94 Big Eight Conference men's basketball standings
	Conf.				Overall
Team	W		L	PCT	W		L	PCT
No. 5 Missouri	14	–	0	1.000	28	–	4	.875
No. 19 Oklahoma State	10	–	4	.714	24	–	10	.706
No. 13 Kansas	9	–	5	.643	27	–	8	.771
No. 22 Nebraska †	7	–	7	.500	20	–	10	.667
Oklahoma	6	–	8	.429	15	–	13	.536
Kansas State	4	–	10	.286	20	–	14	.588
Iowa State	4	–	10	.286	14	–	13	.519
Colorado	2	–	12	.143	10	–	17	.370
† 1994 Big Eight tournament winner As of April 4, 1994; Rankings from AP poll

The 1994 Big Eight Conference men's basketball tournament was held March 11–13 at Kemper Arena in Kansas City, Missouri.

Fourth-seeded Nebraska defeated #2 seed Oklahoma State in the championship game, 77–68, to earn the conference's automatic bid to the 1994 NCAA tournament.

== Bracket ==
Quarterfinals; Friday, March 11
1	#3 Missouri	64
8	Colorado	62
4	Nebraska	105
5	Oklahoma	88
3	#11 Kansas	73
6	Kansas State	52
7	Iowa State	67
2	#23 Oklahoma State	77

Semifinals; Saturday, March 12
1	#3 Missouri	91
4	Nebraska	98
3	#11 Kansas	68
2	#23 Oklahoma State	69

Championship; Sunday, March 13
4	Nebraska	77
2	#23 Oklahoma State	68
