= 1993–94 Iowa State Cyclones men's basketball team =

American college basketball season

1993–94 Iowa State Cyclones men's basketball
- Conference: Big Eight Conference
- Record: 14-13 (4-10 Big Eight)
- Head coach: Johnny Orr (14th season)
- Home arena: Hilton Coliseum

1993–94 Big Eight Conference men's basketball standings
| | Conf. | | | | Overall |
| Team | W | | L | PCT | W | | L | PCT |
|---|---|---|---|---|---|---|---|---|
| No. 5 Missouri | 14 | – | 0 | 1.000 | 28 | – | 4 | .875 |
| No. 19 Oklahoma State | 10 | – | 4 | .714 | 24 | – | 10 | .706 |
| No. 13 Kansas | 9 | – | 5 | .643 | 27 | – | 8 | .771 |
| No. 22 Nebraska † | 7 | – | 7 | .500 | 20 | – | 10 | .667 |
| Oklahoma | 6 | – | 8 | .429 | 15 | – | 13 | .536 |
| Kansas State | 4 | – | 10 | .286 | 20 | – | 14 | .588 |
| Iowa State | 4 | – | 10 | .286 | 14 | – | 13 | .519 |
| Colorado | 2 | – | 12 | .143 | 10 | – | 17 | .370 |
† 1994 Big Eight tournament winner As of April 4, 1994; Rankings from AP poll

The 1993–94 Iowa State Cyclones men's basketball team represented Iowa State University during the 1993–94 NCAA Division I men's basketball season. The Cyclones were coached by Johnny Orr, who was in his 14th season. They played their home games at Hilton Coliseum in Ames, Iowa. This was be Orr's final season as head coach. Tim Floyd would take over the program the following season.

They finished the season 14–13, 4–10 in Big Eight play to finish tied for sixth place. Their 23 wins were a school record at the time. They lost to Oklahoma State in the 1994 Big Eight conference tournament championship. They did not qualify for postseason play.

Games were televised by ESPN, Raycom Sports and the Cyclone Television Network.

== Previous season ==
In the previous season, the Cyclones finished 20–11, 8–6 in Big Eight play to finish tied for second place. They defeated Oklahoma in the 1993 Big Eight conference tournament quarterfinals before losing to Missouri, 67–63. They qualified for the 1992–93 NCAA men's basketball tournament, losing to UCLA in the first round, 81–70.

== Roster ==
Roster
| Name | Position | Class |
|---|---|---|
| Fred Hoiberg | Guard | Junior |
| Loren Meyer | Center | Junior |
| Julius Michalik | Forward | Junior |
| Hurl Beechum | Forward | Junior |
| Derrick Hayes | Guard | Freshman |
| James Hamilton | Forward | Junior |
| Saun Jackson | Forward | Junior |
| Jason Kimbrough | Guard | Freshman |
| Jacy Holloway | Guard | Freshman |
| Joe Modderman | Forward | Freshman |
| Fred Brown | Guard | Senior |
| Marc Carlson | Forward | Senior |
| Clarence Hill | Forward | Sophomore |
| Ha-Keem Abdel-Kahliq | Guard | Freshman |
| Donnell Bivens | Forward | Senior |
| Sol Harris | Guard | Freshman |

== Schedule and results ==
| Date time, TV | Rank^{#} | Opponent^{#} | Result | Record | Site city, state |
Exhibition
| November 16, 1993*; 7:00 pm | | Central Army (CSKA) Russia; Exhibition | W 92-85 | | Hilton Coliseum; Ames, IA |
| November 24, 1993*; 7:00 pm | | Marathon Oil; Exhibition | W 116-78 | | Hilton Coliseum; Ames, Iowa |
Regular season
| December 1, 1993*; 7:00 pm, Cyclone Television Network | | Creighton | W 107-63 | 1-0 | Hilton Coliseum; Ames, IA |
| December 4, 1993*; 7:00 pm, Cyclone Television Network | | Northern Iowa | W 79-66 | 2-0 | Hilton Coliseum; Ames, Iowa |
| December 7, 1993*; 7:00 pm, Cyclone Television Network | | at Drake; Iowa Big Four | W 83-67 | 3-0 | Knapp Center; Des Moines, IA |
| December 11, 1993*; 7:00 pm, Cyclone Television Network | | Iowa | W 86-79 | 4-0 | Hilton Coliseum; Ames, Iowa |
| December 18, 1993*; 8:00 pm, Cyclone Television Network | | Texas–Arlington | W 119-55 | 5-0 | Hilton Coliseum; Ames, Iowa |
| December 21, 1993*; 7:00 pm, Cyclone Television Network | | Charleston-Southern | W 117-81 | 6-0 | Hilton Coliseum; Ames, Iowa |
| December 29, 1993*; 10:30 pm, Cyclone Television Network | | vs. Virginia-Commonwealth; Sierra Medical Center Sun Classic semifinals | L 84-91 | 6-1 | Don Haskins Center; El Paso, Texas |
| December 30, 1993*; 7:30 pm, Cyclone Television Network | | vs. Pepperdine; Sierra Medical Center Sun Classic third place | W 71-64 | 7-1 | Don Haskins Center; El Paso, Texas |
| January 3, 1994; 8:00 pm, ESPN | | Nebraska | L 72-78 | 7-2 (0-1) | Hilton Coliseum; Ames, Iowa |
| January 5, 1994*; 7:00 pm, Cyclone Television Network | | Western Illinois | W 90-53 | 8-2 | Hilton Coliseum; Ames, Iowa |
| January 12, 1994*; 7:00 pm, Cyclone Television Network | | Morningside | W 108-69 | 9-2 | Hilton Coliseum; Ames, Iowa |
| January 15, 1994; 3:00 pm, Raycom | | Oklahoma | L 90-93 | 9-3 (0-2) | Hilton Coliseum; Ames, Iowa |
| January 19, 1994; 7:00 pm, Cyclone Television Network | | at Missouri | L 69-92 | 9-4 (0-3) | Hearnes Center; Columbia, Missouri |
| January 22, 1994; 3:00 pm, Raycom | | No. 1 Kansas | L 71-78 | 9-5 (0-4) | Hilton Coliseum; Ames, Iowa |
| January 24, 1994*; 7:00 pm, Cyclone Television Network | | Florida-Atlantic | W 86-54 | 10-5 | Hilton Coliseum; Ames, Iowa |
| January 29, 1994; 3:00 pm, Raycom | | at Kansas State | L 70-76 | 10-6 (0-5) | Bramlage Coliseum; Manhattan, Kansas |
| February 1, 1994; 7:00 pm, Cyclone Television Network | | Colorado | W 99-69 | 11-6 (1-5) | Hilton Coliseum; Ames, Iowa |
| February 5, 1994; 1:00 pm, Raycom | | at Oklahoma State | L 66-79 | 11-7 (1-6) | Gallagher-Iba Arena; Stillwater, Oklahoma |
| February 9, 1994*; 7:00 pm, Cyclone Television Network | | at No. 17 Saint Louis | L 75-90 | 11-8 | St. Louis Arena; St. Louis, Missouri |
| February 12, 1994; 1:00 pm, Raycom | | at Nebraska | L 96-102 | 11-9 (1-7) | Devaney Center; Lincoln, Nebraska |
| February 16, 1994; 7:00 pm, Cyclone Television Network | | No. 12 Missouri | L 72-79 ^{ot} | 11-10 (1-8) | Hilton Coliseum; Ames, Iowa |
| February 19, 1994; 1:00 pm, Raycom | | at Colorado | W 81-78 | 12-10 (2-8) | Coors Events Center; Boulder, Colorado |
| February 23, 1994; 7:00 pm, Cyclone Television Network | | at Oklahoma | W 95-82 | 13-10 (3-8) | Lloyd Noble Center; Norman, Oklahoma |
| February 26, 1994; 1:00 pm, Raycom | | No. 24 Oklahoma State | L 81-83 | 13-11 (3-9) | Hilton Coliseum; Ames, Iowa |
| March 3, 1994; 8:30 pm, ESPN | | at No. 13 Kansas | L 79-97 | 13-12 (3-10) | Allen Fieldhouse; Lawrence, Kansas |
| March 6, 1994; 1:00 pm, Cyclone Television Network | | Kansas State | W 85-60 | 14-12 (4-10) | Hilton Coliseum; Ames, Iowa |
Big Eight tournament
| March 11, 1994; 6:00 pm, Raycom | | vs. No. 23 Oklahoma State; Quarterfinals | L 67-77 | 14-13 | Kemper Arena; Kansas City, Missouri |
*Non-conference game. ^{#}Rankings from AP poll. (#) Tournament seedings in parentheses. All times are in Central Time.

== Awards and honors ==
*Academic All-Americans

Fred Hoiberg (Second team)
Julius Michalik (Third team)

- All-Big Eight Selections

Fred Hoiberg (Second team)
Julius Michalik (HM)

*Academic All-Big Eight

Marc Carlson
Fred Hoiberg
Julius Michalik

- Ralph Olsen Award

Fred Hoiberg
