= Jamal Faulkner =

American basketball player

Personal information
- Born: July 3, 1971 (age 55) Brooklyn, New York, U.S.
- Listed height: 6 ft 7 in (2.01 m)
- Listed weight: 215 lb (98 kg)

Career information
- High school: Christ the King (Middle Village, New York)
- College: Arizona State (1990–1992); Alabama (1993–1995)
- NBA draft: 1995: undrafted
- Playing career: 1995–2003
- Position: Power forward / center

Career history
- 1995: Oklahoma City Cavalry
- 1996: AZS Elana Toruń
- 1996: Treasure Coast Tropics
- 1996–1997: Chorale Roanne
- 1997: Titanes de Morovis
- 1997: Ericsson Bobry Bytom
- 1997–1999: Benfica
- 1999–2000: Portugal Telecom
- 2000–2001: Sallen Basket
- 2001: Cupes de Los Pepines
- 2001–2002: Hapoel Holon
- 2002: Maccabi Ashdod
- 2002: Leicester Riders
- 2002: Ironi Ramat Gan

Career highlights
- Polish league All-Star (1996); Pacific-10 Freshman of the Year (1991); McDonald's All-American (1989); Second-team Parade All-American (1989); Fourth-team Parade All-American (1988)
Medals
Men's basketball
Representing United States
FIBA U19 World Championship
Gold medal – first place	1991 Edmonton	Team competition

Jamal Faulkner (born July 3, 1971) is an American former professional basketball player. A versatile forward who primarily played small forward but could also be used at the power forward position, he was one of the top recruits of the high school class of 1989. After having to sit out one year due to poor grades, he played two seasons at Arizona State before being dismissed due to Faulkner's trouble with the law. After missing one more year he finished his college career at Alabama, and went undrafted in the 1995 NBA draft. He then spent 8 years playing professional basketball, mostly in Europe.

== High school career ==
Faulkner was born in Brooklyn, New York and lived in Bedford–Stuyvesant. He grew up with his mother, Connie, since his father was not a part of his life. Faulkner attended Christ the King Regional High School in Middle Village, in the Queens borough of New York City. He was a part of the varsity team since his sophomore year, and chose to wear jersey number 35. He was a teammate of another top recruit of his class, Khalid Reeves, and of another younger guard, Derrick Phelps; Faulkner was considered one of the best players at Christ the King, and the main aspect of his game was team play: while Reeves was the main scoring option, Faulkner was unselfish and involved the other teammates. At the end of his junior year, he was named in the Parade All-America Fourth Team.

Faulkner's senior year in high school was very successful: Christ the King won the Class A state title, and Faulkner recorded 10 points and 12 rebounds in the final game versus Adlai Stevenson. He averaged 24 points and 15 rebounds for the season, and was one of the top recruits in the nation, being named in the Parade Second Team and earning a selection in the McDonald's All-American team: in the 1989 McDonald's All-American Boys Game he scored 5 points, shooting 2/6 from the field and 1/2 from the free throw line.

== College career ==
=== Arizona State ===
Faulkner was recruited by Temple, Clemson, Texas and Pitt during his high school career: he had initially committed to Texas, but then signed a letter of intent for Pitt. However, not only Faulkner did not qualify academically and had to sit out one year according to Proposition 48, but Pitt was also found guilty of violation of NCAA rules for his recruitment. Forced to sit out one year, he chose to attend Cheshire Academy in Cheshire, Connecticut.

Once he was eligible again, he was unable to attend Pitt and committed to Arizona State. He immediately made an impact during his freshman season, scoring 18 points against Kansas on his debut game on November 23, 1990. Faulkner's good performances during his first year at Arizona State earned him a starting role, and he started 28 games out of the 30 he played. He recorded freshman school records in several categories: points per game (15.4), rebounds per game (6.2), total blocks (33), total points (462) and 20-points games (7). All of these records have since been surpassed. He played 32.1 minutes per game in Pacific-10 games, and 29.1 in total. He scored a career-high 29 points against Arkansas on March 17, 1991. At the end of the season Faulkner was named Pacific-10 Freshman of the Year.

Faulkner was involved in a credit card fraud case where he and three of his teammates (Lynn Collins, Dwayne Fontana and Stevin Smith) used assistant coach George McQuarn's card for unauthorized long-distance calls for a total of US$13,474. He received a two-year probation sentence and had to do 100 hours of community service.

During his sophomore season Faulkner's numbers slightly decreased, but he was still considered a starter of the Arizona State team. He averaged 12.6 points (leading the team in scoring), 5.6 rebounds and 1.2 assists in 29 games (20 starts). In August 1992 he was convicted to a 30-days sentence for violation of probation terms when he failed to report to his probation officer and did not perform his scheduled community service. In September 1992 he was arrested on assault charges after he slapped former girlfriend Rosalyn Felder, a fellow student at Arizona State. After this arrest, Arizona State decided to exclude him from the team. Faulkner spent a total of six days in jail.

He ended his career at Arizona State with averages of 14.0 points, 5.9 rebounds and 1.3 assists.

=== Alabama ===
Due to his conviction and to his dismissal from Arizona State, Faulkner missed the entire 1992–93 season. He came back in 1993, joining the Alabama Crimson Tide, where he wore jersey number 30. He was mainly used as a reserve in his first year, being the first option off the bench, but he still managed to be the team's leading scorer, averaging 13.5 points. He also averaged 6.1 rebounds and recorded career-highs in assists (1.9 per game) and steals (1.1). He started 12 of his 26 games.

His positive junior year made him a starter for the following season. He averaged 12.3 points, 5.8 rebounds and 1.4 assists in 33 games for Alabama, which was eliminated by Oklahoma State in the second-round of the East Regional part of the 1995 NCAA Division I men's basketball tournament. Faulkner was the second best scorer (behind Antonio McDyess) and third best rebounder of the team. During his time at Alabama he formed an especially effective front court with McDyess and Jason Caffey.

His career at Alabama ended with averages of 12.8 points, 5.9 rebounds and 1.6 assists.

=== College statistics ===
Year	Team	GP	GS	MPG	FG%	3P%	FT%	RPG	APG	SPG	BPG	PPG
1990–91	Arizona State	30	28	29.1	.492	.302	.699	6.2	1.2	1.0	1.1	15.4
1991–92	Arizona State	29	20	28.9	.408	.316	.643	5.6	0.9	0.7	0.5	12.6
1993–94	Alabama	26	12	25.2	.430	.286	.646	6.1	1.9	1.1	0.7	13.5
1994–95	Alabama	33	16	24.7	.489	.326	.688	5.8	1.4	0.8	0.5	12.3
Career		118	76	27.0	.456	.309	.670	5.9	1.3	0.9	0.7	13.4

== Professional career ==
After the end of his senior season, Faulkner was automatically eligible for the 1995 NBA draft. He was projected as a possible second-round pick, and was called to work out for the Houston Rockets before the draft. However, he was not selected during the draft. He was drafted in the fourth round of the Continental Basketball Association draft (52nd overall) by the Oklahoma City Cavalry. In October he signed for the New York Knicks as a free agent, but he was not included in the final roster.

Despite having been selected in the roster of the Oklahoma City Cavalry, he did not appear during the 1995–96 CBA season since he transferred to Polish team AZS Elana Toruń in January 1996. In the Polish Basketball League he found success, and he was named an All-Star: he scored 20 points in the May 1996 Polish All-Star game. He finished the season with a scoring average of 25.5 points per game. In June 1996 he signed for the Treasure Coast Tropics of the USBL.

He then joined French club Chorale Roanne, which played in the LNB Pro B, the second tier of French basketball. In 21 games he averaged 22.6 points and 8.9 rebounds in 38.2 minutes per game while shooting 59.8% from the field, playing the whole 1996–97 season. He then had two brief stints in Puerto Rico and again in Poland, this time with Ericsson Bobry Bytom.

In 1997 he signed for Portuguese club Benfica, and he stayed there until 1999; he then signed for Portugal Telecom, where played until July 2000. He then moved to Sweden and spent one season at Sallen.

After a brief experience with Dominican club Cupes de Los Pepines he transferred to Israel. He stayed there from 2001 to 2002 playing for Hapoel Holon and Maccabi Ashdod. In 2002 he played 4 games for Leicester Riders, averaging 22.5 points and 8.8 rebounds before being released in late November 2002. He ended his professional career in Israel, where he signed for Ironi Ramat Gan: he played 18 games (17 starts) averaging 14.7 points, 6.9 rebounds and 1.0 assist in 31.8 minutes per game.
