= 1994 SEC men's basketball tournament =

College basketball postseason tournament

- Classification: Division I
- Season: 1993–94
- Teams: 12
- Site: The Pyramid Arena; Memphis, Tennessee
- Champions: Kentucky (19th title)
- Winning coach: Rick Pitino (3rd title)
- MVP: Travis Ford (Kentucky)
- Attendance: 195,942
- Television: Jefferson Pilot Sports

1993–94 Southeastern Conference men's basketball standings
	Conf.				Overall
Team	W		L	PCT	W		L	PCT
East
No. 14 Florida	12	–	4	.750	29	–	8	.784
No. 7 Kentucky †	12	–	4	.750	27	–	7	.794
Vanderbilt	9	–	7	.563	20	–	12	.625
Georgia	7	–	9	.438	14	–	16	.467
South Carolina	4	–	12	.250	9	–	19	.321
Tennessee	2	–	14	.125	5	–	22	.185
West
No. 2 Arkansas	14	–	2	.875	31	–	3	.912
Alabama	12	–	4	.750	20	–	10	.667
Mississippi State	9	–	7	.563	18	–	11	.621
Ole Miss	7	–	9	.438	14	–	13	.519
LSU	5	–	11	.313	11	–	16	.407
Auburn	3	–	13	.188	11	–	17	.393
† 1994 SEC tournament winner Rankings from AP Poll

The 1994 SEC men's basketball tournament took place from March 10–13 at the Pyramid Arena in Memphis, Tennessee. The entire tournament, including the SEC Championship Game, was televised by Jefferson Pilot Sports, which at the time was in its seventh season with the syndication rights to the SEC. Play-by-play commentary was provided by Tom Hammond and Barry Booker, with sideline reports provided by Dave Baker, and Bob Kesling, and the halftime reports.

The Kentucky Wildcats won the SEC Tournament for an overall 19th SEC Tournament title, and received the automatic bid to the 1994 NCAA Men’s Division I Basketball Tournament by defeating the Florida Gators 73–60.

== Bracket ==
First round
W4	Ole Miss	57
E5	South Carolina	80
E3	Vanderbilt	56
W6	Auburn	81
E4	Georgia	83
W5	LSU	70
W3	Mississippi State	73
E6	Tennessee	69

Second Round
E1	#17 Florida	84
E5	South Carolina	57
W2	Alabama	83
W6	Auburn	55
W1	#1 Arkansas	95
E4	Georgia	83
E2	#10 Kentucky	95
W3	Mississippi State	76

Semifinals
E1	#17 Florida	68
W2	Alabama	52
W1	#1 Arkansas	78
E2	#10 Kentucky	90

Championship Game
E1	#17 Florida	60
E2	#10 Kentucky	73
