= 1993–94 Oklahoma State Cowboys basketball team =

American college basketball season

1993–94 Oklahoma State Cowboys basketball

NCAA tournament, second round
- Conference: Big Eight Conference

Ranking
- Coaches: No. 21
- AP: No. 19
- Record: 24–10 (10–4 Big Eight)
- Head coach: Eddie Sutton (4th season)
- Assistant coach: John Pelphrey
- Home arena: Gallagher-Iba Arena (Capacity: 6,381)

1993–94 Big Eight Conference men's basketball standings
| | Conf. | | | | Overall |
| Team | W | | L | PCT | W | | L | PCT |
|---|---|---|---|---|---|---|---|---|
| No. 5 Missouri | 14 | – | 0 | 1.000 | 28 | – | 4 | .875 |
| No. 19 Oklahoma State | 10 | – | 4 | .714 | 24 | – | 10 | .706 |
| No. 13 Kansas | 9 | – | 5 | .643 | 27 | – | 8 | .771 |
| No. 22 Nebraska † | 7 | – | 7 | .500 | 20 | – | 10 | .667 |
| Oklahoma | 6 | – | 8 | .429 | 15 | – | 13 | .536 |
| Kansas State | 4 | – | 10 | .286 | 20 | – | 14 | .588 |
| Iowa State | 4 | – | 10 | .286 | 14 | – | 13 | .519 |
| Colorado | 2 | – | 12 | .143 | 10 | – | 17 | .370 |
† 1994 Big Eight tournament winner As of April 4, 1994; Rankings from AP poll

The 1993–94 Oklahoma State Cowboys basketball team represented Oklahoma State University as a member of the Big Eight Conference during the 1993–94 NCAA Division I men's basketball season. The team was led by fourth-year head coach Eddie Sutton and played their home games at Gallagher-Iba Arena. The Cowboys finished with a record of 24–10 (10–4 Big Eight) and earned a second place finish in Big Eight regular season play.

Oklahoma State received an at-large bid to the NCAA tournament as No. 4 seed in the Midwest region. After defeating New Mexico State in the opening round, the Cowboys were defeated by Tulsa, 82–80.

== Roster ==
1993–94 Oklahoma State Cowboys men's basketball team
Players
Coaches

| Pos. | # | Name | Height | Weight | Year | Previous school | Hometown |
|---|---|---|---|---|---|---|---|
| G | 15 | Randy Rutherford | 6 ft 3 in (1.91 m) | 185 lb (84 kg) | Jr | Bacone JC | Broken Bow, Oklahoma |
| G | 22 | Brooks Thompson | 6 ft 4 in (1.93 m) | 195 lb (88 kg) | Sr | Texas A&M | Littleton, Colorado |
| C | 50 | Bryant Reeves | 7 ft 0 in (2.13 m) | 265 lb (120 kg) | Jr | Gans | Gans, Oklahoma |

Head coach

- Eddie Sutton

Assistant coach(es)

Legend

- (C) Team captain
- (S) Suspended
- (I) Ineligible
- (W) Walk-on
- Injured
- Current redshirt

== Schedule and results ==
| Date time, TV | Rank^{#} | Opponent^{#} | Result | Record | Site (attendance) city, state |
Regular Season
| Nov 24, 1993* | No. 10 | vs. Providence | W 113–102 ^{OT} | 1–0 | Tulsa Convention Center; Tulsa, Oklahoma |
| Nov 27, 1993* | No. 10 | at SMU | W 88–72 | 2–0 | Moody Coliseum; Dallas, Texas |
| Nov 29, 1993* | No. 8 | Oral Roberts | W 94–52 | 3–0 | Gallagher-Iba Arena; Stillwater, Oklahoma |
| Dec 2, 1993* | No. 8 | vs. Arizona State | W 87–69 | 4–0 | Mabee Center; Tulsa, Oklahoma |
| Dec 5, 1993* | No. 8 | vs. No. 19 Arizona | L 84–97 | 4–1 | America West Arena (9,817); Phoenix, Arizona |
| Dec 9, 1993* | No. 15 | TCU | W 89–67 | 5–1 | Gallagher-Iba Arena; Stillwater, Oklahoma |
| Dec 11, 1993* | No. 15 | vs. LSU | L 68–71 | 5–2 | New Orleans, Louisiana |
| Dec 18, 1993* | No. 22 | UC Davis | W 85–41 | 6–2 | Gallagher-Iba Arena; Stillwater, Oklahoma |
| Dec 20, 1993* | No. 22 | at Tulsa | W 73–61 | 7–2 | Tulsa Convention Center; Tulsa, Oklahoma |
| Dec 27, 1993* | No. 20 | vs. Florida; Rainbow Classic | L 69–74 | 7–3 | Neal S. Blaisdell Center; Honolulu, Hawaii |
| Dec 28, 1993* | No. 20 | vs. UC Santa Barbara; Rainbow Classic | W 79–74 | 8–3 | Neal S. Blaisdell Center; Honolulu, Hawaii |
| Dec 29, 1993* | No. 20 | vs. Clemson; Rainbow Classic | L 65–68 | 8–4 | Neal S. Blaisdell Center; Honolulu, Hawaii |
| Jan 4, 1994* | | Prairie View A&M | W 113–51 | 9–4 | Gallagher-Iba Arena; Stillwater, Oklahoma |
| Jan 8, 1994 | | at Oklahoma | W 105–89 | 10–4 (1–0) | Lloyd Noble Center; Norman, Oklahoma |
| Jan 10, 1994* | | West Texas A&M | W 103–45 | 11–4 | Gallagher-Iba Arena; Stillwater, Oklahoma |
| Jan 15, 1994 | | at Kansas State | W 71–61 | 12–4 (2–0) | Bramlage Coliseum; Manhattan, Kansas |
| Jan 19, 1994* | | at SW Missouri State | W 68–63 | 13–4 | Hammons Student Center; Springfield, Missouri |
| Jan 22, 1994 | | Missouri | L 68–73 | 13–5 (2–1) | Gallagher-Iba Arena; Stillwater, Oklahoma |
| Jan 26, 1994 | | at No. 3 Kansas | L 61–62 ^{OT} | 13–6 (2–2) | Allen Fieldhouse; Lawrence, Kansas |
| Feb 2, 1994 | | Kansas State | W 80–59 | 14–6 (3–2) | Gallagher-Iba Arena; Stillwater, Oklahoma |
| Feb 5, 1994 | | Iowa State | W 79–66 | 15–6 (4–2) | Gallagher-Iba Arena; Stillwater, Oklahoma |
| Feb 7, 1994 | | Oklahoma | W 86–68 | 16–6 (5–2) | Gallagher-Iba Arena; Stillwater, Oklahoma |
| Feb 12, 1994 | | at No. 15 Missouri | L 70–72 | 16–7 (5–3) | Hearnes Center; Columbia, Missouri |
| Feb 16, 1994 | | No. 4 Kansas | W 63–59 ^{OT} | 17–7 (6–3) | Gallagher-Iba Arena; Stillwater, Oklahoma |
| Feb 19, 1994 | | Nebraska | W 98–80 | 18–7 (7–3) | Gallagher-Iba Arena; Stillwater, Oklahoma |
| Feb 21, 1994 | No. 24 | at Colorado | W 73–56 | 19–7 (8–3) | Coors Events/Conference Center; Boulder, Colorado |
| Feb 26, 1994 | No. 24 | at Iowa State | W 83–81 | 20–7 (9–3) | Hilton Coliseum; Ames, Iowa |
| Mar 2, 1994 | No. 21 | at Nebraska | L 81–89 | 20–8 (9–4) | Bob Devaney Sports Center; Lincoln, Nebraska |
| Mar 5, 1994 | No. 21 | Colorado | W 83–68 | 21–8 (10–4) | Gallagher-Iba Arena; Stillwater, Oklahoma |
Big Eight Tournament
| Mar 11, 1994* | (2) No. 23 | vs. (7) Iowa State; Quarterfinals | W 77–67 | 22–8 | Kemper Arena; Kansas City, Missouri |
| Mar 12, 1994* | (2) No. 23 | vs. (3) No. 11 Kansas; Semifinals | W 69–68 | 23–8 | Kemper Arena; Kansas City, Missouri |
| Mar 13, 1994* | (2) No. 23 | vs. (4) Nebraska; Championship game | L 68–77 | 23–9 | Kemper Arena; Kansas City, Missouri |
NCAA tournament
| Mar 18, 1994* | (4 MW) No. 19 | vs. (13 MW) New Mexico State; First Round | W 65–55 | 24–9 | Myriad Convention Center; Oklahoma City, Oklahoma |
| Mar 20, 1994* | (4 MW) No. 19 | vs. (12 MW) Tulsa; Second Round | L 80–82 | 24–10 | Myriad Convention Center; Oklahoma City, Oklahoma |
*Non-conference game. ^{#}Rankings from AP Poll. (#) Tournament seedings in parentheses. MW=Midwest. All times are in Central Time.
