= 1994 Ohio Valley Conference men's basketball tournament =

- Classification: Division I
- Season: 1993–94
- Teams: 7
- Site: Nashville Municipal Auditorium; Nashville, Tennessee
- Champions: Tennessee State (2nd title)
- Winning coach: Frankie Allen (2nd title)
- MVP: Carlos Rogers (Tennessee State)

1993–94 Ohio Valley Conference men's basketball standings
| | Conf. | | | | Overall |
| Team | W | | L | PCT | W | | L | PCT |
|---|---|---|---|---|---|---|---|---|
| Murray State | 15 | – | 1 | .938 | 23 | – | 6 | .793 |
| Tennessee State † | 12 | – | 4 | .750 | 19 | – | 12 | .613 |
| Austin Peay | 10 | – | 6 | .625 | 11 | – | 16 | .407 |
| Eastern Kentucky | 9 | – | 7 | .563 | 13 | – | 14 | .481 |
| Morehead State | 8 | – | 8 | .500 | 14 | – | 14 | .500 |
| Tennessee Tech | 5 | – | 11 | .313 | 10 | – | 21 | .323 |
| Middle Tennessee | 5 | – | 11 | .313 | 8 | – | 19 | .296 |
| Southeast Missouri State | 5 | – | 11 | .313 | 10 | – | 17 | .370 |
| UT Martin | 3 | – | 13 | .188 | 5 | – | 22 | .185 |
† 1994 OVC tournament winner Rankings from AP Poll

The 1994 Ohio Valley Conference men's basketball tournament was the final event of the 1993–94 season in the Ohio Valley Conference. The tournament was held March 3–5, 1994, at Nashville Municipal Auditorium in Nashville, Tennessee.

Tennessee State defeated Murray State in the championship game, 73–72, to win their second straight OVC men's basketball tournament.

The Tigers received an automatic bid to the 1994 NCAA tournament as the No. 14 seed in the Southeast region.

== Format ==
Seven of the nine conference members participated in the tournament field. They were seeded based on regular season conference records, with the top seed (Murray State) receiving a bye to the semifinal round. The teams were re-seeded after the opening round. Southeast Missouri State and Tennessee-Martin did not participate.

== Bracket ==
Quarterfinals; Tuesday, March 3
4 | Eastern Kentucky | 78
5 | Morehead State | 83
(Pairings are reseeded after the first round)
3 | Austin Peay | 91
6 | Tennessee Tech | 101
2 | Tennessee State | 61
7 | Middle Tennessee | 60

Semifinals; Wednesday, March 4
1 | Murray State | 104
5 | Morehead State | 86
6 | Tennessee Tech | 74
2 | Tennessee State | 91

Championship; Thursday, March 5
1 | Murray State | 72
2 | Tennessee State | 73
