= 1993 Maui Invitational =

1993 Maui Invitational Tournament
- Season: 1993–94
- Teams: 8
- Finals site: Lahaina Civic Center; Maui, Hawaii
- Champions: Kentucky (1st title)
- Runner-up: Arizona (1st title game)
- Semifinalists: Boston College; Ohio State
- Winning coach: Rick Pitino (1st title)
- MVP: Travis Ford (Kentucky)

The 1993 Maui Invitational Tournament was an early-season college basketball tournament that was played, for the 10th time, from December 22 to December 24, 1993. The tournament, which began in 1984, was part of the 1993-94 NCAA Division I men's basketball season. The tournament was played at the Lahaina Civic Center in Maui, Hawaii and was won by the Kentucky Wildcats. It was the first title for the program and its head coach Rick Pitino.

== Bracket ==
5th place game December 24
Notre Dame | 72
Texas | 89
7th place game
Chaminade | 78
Tennessee Tech | 83

Consolation 2nd Round; December 23
Chaminade | 78
Notre Dame | 94
Tennessee Tech | 85
Texas | 97

First Round; December 22
Chaminade | 61
20 | Boston College | 108
Notre Dame | 79
12 | Arizona | 98
Ohio State | 98
Tennessee Tech | 77
5 | Kentucky | 86
Texas | 61

Semifinals; December 23
20 | Boston College | 65
12 | Arizona | 70
Ohio State | 88
5 | Kentucky | 100

Championship; December 24
12 | Arizona | 92
5 | Kentucky | 93
3rd place game
20 | Boston College | 67
Ohio State | 69
