= 1993–94 California Golden Bears men's basketball team =

American college basketball season

1993–94 California Golden Bears men's basketball

NCAA tournament, first round
- Conference: Pacific-10 Conference

Ranking
- AP: No. 16
- Record: 22–8 (13–5 Pac-10)
- Head coach: Todd Bozeman (2nd season)
- Assistant coach: Billy Kennedy (1st season)
- Home arena: Harmon Gym

1993–94 Pacific-10 Conference men's basketball standings
	Conf.				Overall
Team	W		L	PCT	W		L	PCT
No. 9 Arizona	14	–	4	.778	29	–	6	.829
No. 17 UCLA	13	–	5	.722	21	–	7	.750
No. 16 California	13	–	5	.722	22	–	8	.733
Washington State	10	–	8	.556	20	–	11	.645
Stanford	10	–	8	.556	17	–	11	.607
Arizona State	10	–	8	.556	15	–	13	.536
USC	9	–	9	.500	16	–	12	.571
Oregon	6	–	12	.333	10	–	17	.370
Washington	3	–	15	.167	5	–	22	.185
Oregon State	2	–	16	.111	6	–	21	.222
Rankings from AP Poll

The 1993–94 California Golden Bears men's basketball team represented the University of California, Berkeley in the 1993–94 season.

Led by head coach Todd Bozeman, the Bears finished the regular season with a record of 22–7, and a record of 13–5 in the Pac-10, placing them second. The Bears received an at-large bid into the NCAA tournament, where they fell in the first round to Green Bay.

Following the season, sophomore guard Jason Kidd declared eligibility for the NBA draft, and began a career in which he played for the Dallas Mavericks, New Jersey Nets, Phoenix Suns, and New York Knicks. In his NBA career, he became a consistent all-star and won one NBA Championship, in 2011. In 2018, Kidd was inducted into the NBA Hall of Fame.

== Roster ==
1993–94 California Golden Bears men's basketball team
Players
Coaches

Pos.	#	Name	Height	Weight	Year	Hometown
G	5	Jason Kidd	6 ft 4 in (1.93 m)	200 lb (91 kg)	So	St. Joseph Notre Dame	San Francisco, CA
F	21	Lamond Murray	6 ft 7 in (2.01 m)	236 lb (107 kg)	Jr	John F. Kennedy	Pasadena, CA
G	23	Randy Duck	6 ft 0 in (1.83 m)	—	Fr
F	44	Michael Stewart	6 ft 10 in (2.08 m)	220 lb (100 kg)	Fr	John F. Kennedy	Sacramento, CA

Head coach

- Todd Bozeman

Assistant coach(es)

- Billy Kennedy (Southeastern Louisiana)

Legend

- (C) Team captain
- (S) Suspended
- (I) Ineligible
- (W) Walk-on
- Injured
- Current redshirt

== Schedule and results ==
Date time, TV	Rank^{#}	Opponent^{#}	Result	Record	Site city, state
Regular season
Nov 17, 1993*	No. 6	vs. Santa Clara; Preseason NIT First Round	W 81–74	1–0	Oakland Arena; Oakland, California
Nov 18, 1993*	No. 6	at No. 9 Kansas; Preseason NIT Second Round	L 56–73	1–1	Allen Fieldhouse; Lawrence, Kansas
Dec 1, 1993*	No. 13	at Texas Southern	W 82–70	2–1	Health and Physical Education Arena; Houston, Texas
Dec 4, 1993*	No. 13	Santa Clara	L 67–80	2–2	Harmon Gym; Berkeley, California
Dec 10, 1993*	No. 25	UMBC	W 80–48	3–2	Harmon Gym; Berkeley, California
Dec 11, 1993*	No. 25	Tulane	W 83–70	4–2	Harmon Gym; Berkeley, California
Dec 23, 1993*		Richmond	W 85–78	5–2	Harmon Gym; Berkeley, California
Dec 30, 1993*		at Wake Forest	L 72–73	6–2	LJVM Coliseum; Winston-Salem, North Carolina
Jan 2, 1994*		Saint Mary's	W 94–77	7–2	Harmon Gym; Berkeley, California
Jan 6, 1994	No. 24	Washington State	W 70–54	8–2 (1–0)	Harmon Gym; Berkeley, California
Jan 8, 1994	No. 24	Washington	W 79–64	9–2 (2–0)	Harmon Gym; Berkeley, California
Jan 13, 1994	No. 19	at No. 6 Arizona	W 98–93	10–2 (3–0)	McKale Center; Tucson, Arizona
Jan 15, 1994	No. 19	at Arizona State	L 60–63	10–3 (3–1)	Wells Fargo Arena; Tempe, Arizona
Jan 20, 1994	No. 21	at Stanford	L 79–88	10–4 (3–2)	Maples Pavilion; Stanford, California
Jan 27, 1994		USC	W 77–68	11–4 (4–2)	Harmon Gym; Berkeley, California
Jan 30, 1994		No. 1 UCLA	W 85–70	12–4 (5–2)	Harmon Gym (15,039); Berkeley, California
Feb 3, 1994	No. 19	at Oregon State	W 67–61	13–4 (6–2)	Gill Coliseum; Corvallis, Oregon
Feb 5, 1994	No. 19	at Oregon	W 81–61	14–4 (7–2)	McArthur Court; Eugene, Oregon
Feb 7, 1994*	No. 18	Cal State Northridge	W 93–63	15–4	Harmon Gym; Berkeley, California
Feb 10, 1994	No. 18	Arizona State	L 78–95	16–4 (8–2)	Harmon Gym; Berkeley, California
Feb 13, 1994	No. 18	No. 16 Arizona	L 77–96	16–5 (8–3)	Harmon Gym; Berkeley, California
Feb 17, 1994	No. 19	Stanford	W 80–62	17–5 (9–3)	Harmon Gym; Berkeley, California
Feb 20, 1994*	No. 23	vs. No. 19 Cincinnati; 7-Up Shootout	W 70–67	18–5	Orlando Arena; Orlando, Florida
Feb 24, 1994	No. 17	at No. 15 UCLA	W 85–70	19–5 (10–3)	Pauley Pavilion (12,761); Los Angeles, California
Feb 26, 1994	No. 17	at USC	L 78–86 ^{OT}	19–6 (10–4)	L.A. Sports Arena; Los Angeles, California
Mar 3, 1994	No. 20	Oregon	W 82–73	20–6 (11–4)	Harmon Gym; Berkeley, California
Mar 5, 1994	No. 20	at Oregon State	W 74–44	21–6 (12–4)	Harmon Gym; Berkeley, California
Mar 10, 1994	No. 16	at Washington	W 62–56	22–6 (13–4)	Hec Edmundson Pavilion; Seattle, Washington
Mar 12, 1994	No. 16	at Washington State	L 82–94	22–7 (13–5)	Friel Court; Pullman, Washington
NCAA Tournament
Mar 17, 1994*	(5 W) No. 16	vs. (12 W) Wisconsin-Green Bay; First round	L 57–61	22–8	Dee Events Center; Ogden, Utah
*Non-conference game. ^{#}Rankings from AP Poll. (#) Tournament seedings in parentheses. W=West. All times are in Eastern.

== Team players drafted into the NBA ==
Round	Pick	Player	NBA team
1	2	Jason Kidd	Dallas Mavericks
1	7	Lamond Murray	Los Angeles Clippers
