= 1993–94 Kansas Jayhawks men's basketball team =

American college basketball season

1993–94 Kansas Jayhawks men's basketball

Preseason NIT Champions Golden Harvest Classic Champions

NCAA men's Division I tournament, Sweet Sixteen
- Conference: Big Eight Conference

Ranking
- Coaches: No. 12
- AP: No. 13
- Record: 27–8 (9–5 Big Eight)
- Head coach: Roy Williams (6th season)
- Assistant coaches: Matt Doherty (2nd season); Steve Robinson (6th season)
- Captains: Patrick Richey; Richard Scott; Blake Weichbrodt; Steve Woodberry
- Home arena: Allen Fieldhouse

1993–94 Big Eight Conference men's basketball standings
	Conf.				Overall
Team	W		L	PCT	W		L	PCT
No. 5 Missouri	14	–	0	1.000	28	–	4	.875
No. 19 Oklahoma State	10	–	4	.714	24	–	10	.706
No. 13 Kansas	9	–	5	.643	27	–	8	.771
No. 22 Nebraska †	7	–	7	.500	20	–	10	.667
Oklahoma	6	–	8	.429	15	–	13	.536
Kansas State	4	–	10	.286	20	–	14	.588
Iowa State	4	–	10	.286	14	–	13	.519
Colorado	2	–	12	.143	10	–	17	.370
† 1994 Big Eight tournament winner As of April 4, 1994; Rankings from AP poll

The 1993–94 Kansas Jayhawks men's basketball team represented the University of Kansas in the 1993–94 NCAA Division I men's basketball season, which was the Jayhawks' 96th basketball season. The head coach was Roy Williams, who served his 6th year at KU. The team played its home games in Allen Fieldhouse in Lawrence, Kansas.

== Roster ==
Name	#	Position	Height	Weight	Year	Home Town
Greg Gurley	33	Guard	6-5	210	Junior	Leawood, Kansas
Greg Ostertag	00	Center	7-2	275	Junior	Duncanville, Texas
Sean Pearson	21	Forward/Guard	6–4	210	Sophomore	LaGrange, Illinois
Scot Pollard	31	Center/Forward	6–11	240	Freshman	San Diego, California
Nick Proud	44	Center	6–10	230	Freshman	Sydney, Australia
Calvin Rayford	10	Guard	5-6	155	Junior	Milwaukee, Wisconsin
Robert Reed	30	Guard	6-1	185	Junior	Kansas City, Kansas
Patrick Richey	12	Forward	6-8	200	Senior	Lee's Summit, Missouri
Richard Scott	34	Forward	6-7	235	Senior	Little Rock, Arkansas
Jacque Vaughn	11	Guard	6–1	180	Freshman	Pasadena, California
Blake Weichbrodt	35	Guard	6–2	195	Senior	Norman, Oklahoma
T.J. Whatley	14	Guard	6–4	175	Sophomore	Benton, Arkansas
B.J. Williams	22	Forward	6–8	200	Freshman	Wichita, Kansas
Steve Woodberry	20	Guard/Forward	6–4	190	Senior	Wichita, Kansas

== Big Eight Conference standings ==
#	Team	Conference	Pct.	Overall	Pct.
1	Missouri	14-0	1.000	28-4	.875
2	Oklahoma State	10-4	.714	24-10	.706
3	Kansas	9-5	.643	27-8	.771
4	Nebraska	7-7	.500	20-10	.667
5	Oklahoma	6-8	.429	15-13	.536
6	Kansas State	4-10	.289	20-14	.588
7	Iowa State	4-10	.289	14-13	.519
8	Colorado	2-12	.143	10-17	.370

== Schedule ==
Date time, TV	Rank^{#}	Opponent^{#}	Result	Record	Site city, state
11/17/1993*	No. 9	Western Michigan; Preseason NIT First Round	W 69-50	1–0	Allen Fieldhouse; Lawrence, KS
11/18/1993*	No. 9	No. 6 California; Preseason NIT Second Round	W 73-56	2–0	Allen Fieldhouse; Lawrence, KS
11/19/1993*	No. 9	vs. No. 10 Minnesota; Preseason NIT Semifinals	W 75-71	3–0	Madison Square Garden; New York, NY
11/20/1993*	No. 9	vs. No. 22 UMass; Preseason NIT Championship Game	W 86-75	4–0	Madison Square Garden; New York, NY
12/1/1993*	No. 3	No. 7 Temple	L 59-73	4-1	Allen Fieldhouse; Lawrence, KS
12/4/1993*	No. 3	at DePaul	W 79-74	5-1	Allstate Arena; Rosemont, IL
12/6/1993*	No. 7	Washburn	W 82-68	6-1	Allen Fieldhouse; Lawrence, KS
12/8/1993*	No. 7	at NC State	W 74-57	7-1	Reynolds Coliseum; Raleigh, NC
12/11/1993*	No. 7	Arkansas-Little Rock	W 98-63	8-1	Allen Fieldhouse; Lawrence, KS
12/18/1993*	No. 6	vs. Georgia; Kuppenheimber Classic	W 89-79	9-1	Georgia Dome; Atlanta, GA
12/20/1993*	No. 6	Furman	W 101-60	10-1	Allen Fieldhouse; Lawrence, KS
12/22/1993*	No. 6	No. 12 Indiana	W 86-83 ^{OT}	11-1	Allen Fieldhouse; Lawrence, KS
12/29/1993*	No. 6	vs. Rhode Island; Golden Harvest Classic First Round	W 73-60	12-1	Kemper Arena; Kansas City, MO
12/30/1993*	No. 6	vs. SMU; Golden Harvest Classic Championship Game	W 91-59	13-1	Kemper Arena; Kansas City, MO
1/5/1994*	No. 5	UNC Asheville	W 90-44	14-1	Allen Fieldhouse; Lawrence, KS
1/8/1994*	No. 5	SMU	W 91-59	15-1	Allen Fieldhouse; Lawrence, KS
1/10/1994	No. 3	Oklahoma	W 94-84	16-1	Allen Fieldhouse; Lawrence, KS
1/17/1994	No. 1	Kansas State; Sunflower Showdown	L 64-68	16-2	Allen Fieldhouse; Lawrence, KS
1/22/1994	No. 1	at Iowa State	W 78-71	17-2	Hilton Coliseum; Ames, IA
1/26/1994	No. 3	Oklahoma State	W 62-61 ^{OT}	18-2	Allen Fieldhouse; Lawrence, KS
1/29/1994	No. 3	at Colorado	W 87-53	19-2	Coors Events Center; Boulder, CO
1/31/1994	No. 3	at No. 20 Missouri; Border War	L 67-69	19-3	Hearnes Center; Columbia, MO
2/6/1994	No. 3	Nebraska	W 94-87	20-3	Allen Fieldhouse; Lawrence, KS
2/12/1994	No. 5	at Kansas State; Sunflower Showdown	W 65-56	21-3	Bramlage Coliseum; Manhattan, KS
2/16/1994	No. 4	at Oklahoma State	L 59-63 ^{OT}	21-4	Gallagher-Iba Arena; Stillwater, OK
2/20/1994	No. 4	No. 12 Missouri; Border War	L 74-81	21-5	Allen Fieldhouse; Lawrence, KS
2/23/1994	No. 10	at Nebraska	L 87-96	21-6	Bob Devaney Sports Center; Lincoln, NE
2/26/1994	No. 10	Colorado	W 106-62	22-6	Allen Fieldhouse; Lawrence, KS
3/3/1994	No. 13	Iowa State	W 97-79	23-6	Allen Fieldhouse; Lawrence, KS
3/6/1994	No. 13	at Oklahoma	W 84-81	24-6	Lloyd Noble Center; Norman, OK
Big Eight Tournament
3/11/1994	No. 11	vs. Kansas State; Quarterfinals	W 73-52	25-6	Kemper Arena; Kansas City, MO
3/12/1994	No. 11	vs. No. 23 Oklahoma State; Semifinals	L 68-69	25-7	Kemper Arena; Kansas City, MO
NCAA tournament
3/17/1994*	No. 13 (4)	vs. (13) Tennessee-Chattanooga; First Round	W 102-73	26-7	Rupp Arena; Lexington, KY
3/19/1994*	No. 13 (4)	vs. (5) Wake Forest; Second Round	W 69-58	27-7	Rupp Arena; Lexington, KY
3/24/1994*	No. 13 (4)	vs. No. 3 (1) Purdue; Sweet Sixteen	L 78-83	27-8	Thompson-Boling Arena; Knoxville, TN
*Non-conference game. ^{#}Rankings from AP Poll, NCAA tournament seeds shown in parentheses. (#) Tournament seedings in parentheses. All times are in Central Standard Time.

== Rankings ==
Poll	Pre	Wk 1	Wk 2	Wk 3	Wk 4	Wk 5	Wk 6	Wk 7	Wk 8	Wk 9	Wk 10	Wk 11	Wk 12	Wk 13	Wk 14	Wk 15	Wk 16	Wk 17
AP	9	6	3	7	6	6	6	5	3	1	3	3	5	4	10	13	11	13
Coaches																		

*There was no coaches poll in week 1.

== See also ==
- 1994 NCAA Division I men's basketball tournament
