= Danny Nee =

American basketball player-coach

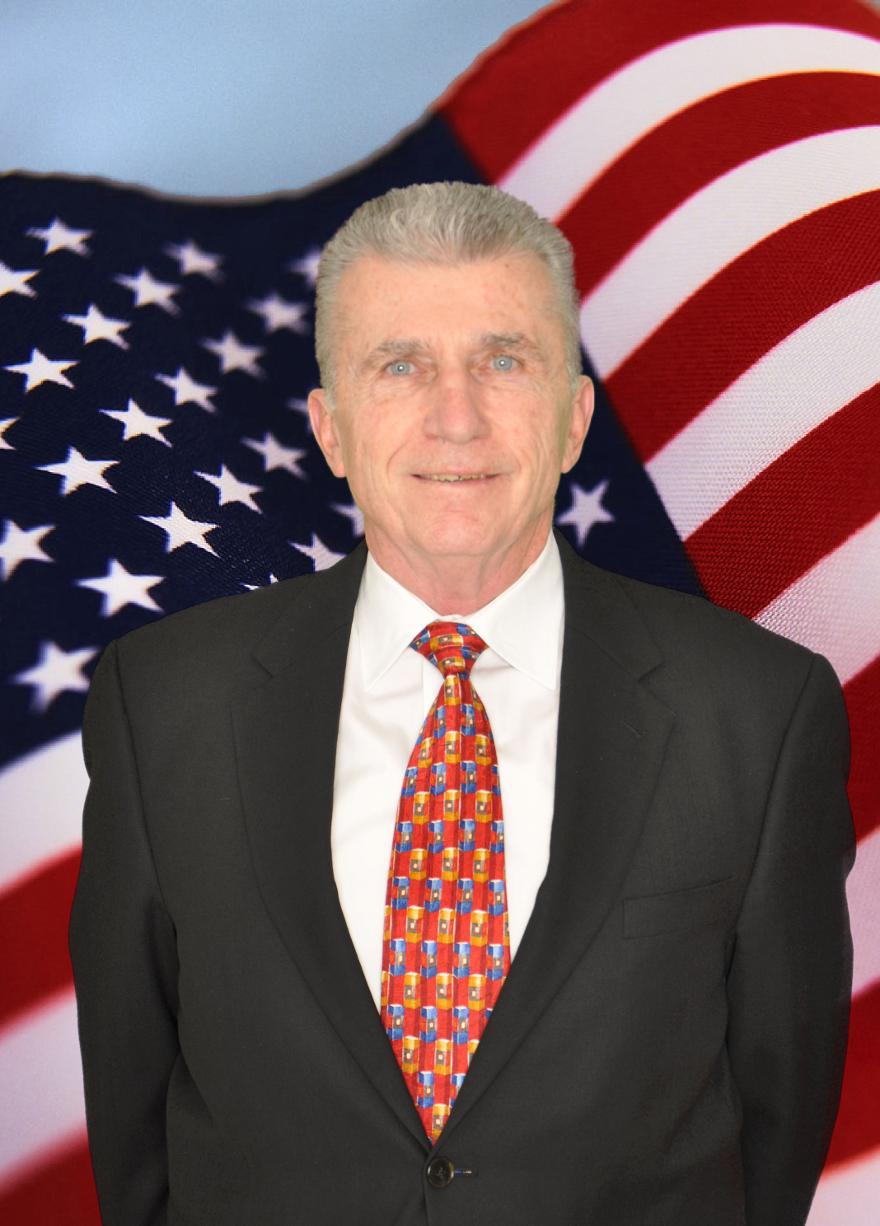

Biographical details
- Born: June 18, 1945 (age 81); Brooklyn, New York, U.S.
- Education: St. Mary of the Plains College; Kansas State University

Playing career
- 1964–1965: Marquette

Coaching career (HC unless noted)
- 1972–1973: Red Bank Regional HS (NJ)
- 1973–1976: Brick Township HS (NJ)
- 1976–1980: Notre Dame (assistant)
- 1980–1986: Ohio
- 1986–2000: Nebraska
- 2000–2001: Robert Morris
- 2001–2006: Duquesne
- 2008–2009: Rutgers (assistant)
- 2009–2010: Towson (assistant)
- 2010–2014: Merchant Marine
- 2015–2020: Gateway HS (PA) (assistant)

Head coaching record
- Overall: 461–433 (college)
- Tournaments: 1–7 (NCAA Division I); 12–5 (NIT)

Accomplishments and honors

Championships
- NIT (1996); MAC regular season (1985); 2 MAC tournament (1983, 1985); Big Eight tournament (1994)

Awards
- 2× MAC Coach of the Year (1983, 1985); Big Eight Coach of the Year (1991)

Daniel Hugh Nee (born June 18, 1945) is an American basketball coach. He served as the head men's basketball coach at Ohio University from 1980 to 1986, the University of Nebraska–Lincoln from 1986 to 2000, Robert Morris University in 2000–01, Duquesne University from 2001 to 2006, and the United States Merchant Marine Academy from 2010 to 2014, compiling a career college basketball coaching record of 461–433.

== Early life ==
Born Daniel Hugh Nee, Danny Nee grew up in his native Brooklyn, New York. His father Patrick immigrated to the U.S. from Ireland. "Rough is what I grew up knowing, and it's what I still know," said Nee in an interview with Sports Illustrated in 1991.

Nee played high school basketball at Power Memorial Academy alongside future NBA Hall of Famer Kareem Abdul-Jabbar. After his junior year in 1963, Nee was expelled from Power Memorial for participating in a gang fight.

For his senior year, Nee transferred to Fort Hamilton High School and was recruited to Marquette University by Al McGuire. Nee was captain of the freshman team but dropped out of Marquette after one year. In 1967, Nee enlisted in the United States Marine Corps. With the Marines, Nee served in the Vietnam War and was honorably discharged in 1968.

Resuming his college education in the U.S., Nee earned a bachelor's degree in English and physical education from St. Mary of the Plains College in 1971 and an M.S. in physical education from Kansas State University in 1972, his master's thesis being titled Intramural programs in the Big Eight universities.

== Coaching career ==
=== High school and assistant in college ===
After earning his degrees, Nee coached high school basketball in New Jersey, first at Red Bank Regional High School from 1972 to 1973 and Brick Township High School from 1973 to 1976 before being recruited as an assistant at Notre Dame by Digger Phelps, where he would coach until hired by Ohio to his first collegiate head coaching appointment.

=== Ohio ===
Nee served as head coach of the Ohio Bobcats men's basketball team for seven years (1980–1986), where he helped rebuild the program which had suffered through several losing seasons, and led the team to two MAC Tournament titles (1983 and 1985), two NCAA tournament appearances (1983 and 1985), and one National Invitation Tournament appearance (1986). In 1993 he was inducted into the Kermit Blosser Ohio Athletics Hall of Fame.

=== Nebraska ===
Following Nee's tenure at Ohio, he became the coach of the Nebraska Cornhuskers from 1986 to 2000. Nee took a historically lackluster Husker program to the next level, leading Nebraska to five NCAA Tournament appearances from 1991–1994 and in 1998. They won the Big Eight tournament championship in 1994. His 1996 squad won the NIT Championship.

On March 13, 2000, athletic director Bill Byrne fired Nee with three years left on Nee's contract. Nee has since been inducted into the Hall of Fame at the University of Nebraska and still holds the record for most wins in school history.

=== After Nebraska ===
After Nebraska, Nee went to Robert Morris University for the 2000-2001 season. In the spring of 2001, he was named head coach of Duquesne University's Duquesne Dukes. Nee officially resigned as head coach after the season's final game on March 4, 2006.

Nee spent the next two years as a scout for the NBA's Utah Jazz. In September 2008, Nee joined Fred Hill's staff at Rutgers University as Director of Player Development.

In July 2009, Towson University hired Nee as an assistant coach on Pat Kennedy's staff.

=== Merchant Marine ===
On October 4, 2010, the United States Merchant Marine Academy named Nee its head men's basketball coach. He was suspended for the final 12 games of the 2013-14 season for a locker room temper tantrum and subsequently fired. In four years, he managed a record that was one game over .500.

=== Back to high school ===
In 2015, Nee joined the staff at Gateway High School in Monroeville, Pennsylvania as an assistant coach. The same year, he also became head coach of the Basketball Stars of America AAU club. He coached the South Fayette Boys Freshman basketball team from 2020-2022.

== Head coaching record ==
Nebraska was awarded a forfeit victory over Texas Tech during the 1996–97 season. Nebraska originally lost that game, 87–74. This game is not reflected in the totals below. Duquesne was awarded a forfeit victory over St. Bonaventure during the 2002–03 season. Duquesne originally lost that game, 86–78. This game is not reflected in the totals below.

Record table
Season	Team	Overall	Conference	Standing	Postseason
Ohio Bobcats (Mid-American Conference) (1980–1986)
1980–81	Ohio	7–20	6–10	T–7th	
1981–82	Ohio	13–14	8–8	T–4th	
1982–83	Ohio	23–9	12–6	2nd	NCAA Division I Second Round
1983–84	Ohio	20–8	14–4	2nd	
1984–85	Ohio	22–8	14–4	1st	NCAA Division I First Round
1985–86	Ohio	22–8	14–4	2nd	NIT First Round
Ohio:		107–67 (.615)	68–36 (.654)		
Nebraska Cornhuskers (Big Eight Conference) (1986–1996)
1986–87	Nebraska	21–12	7–7	5th	NIT Third Place
1987–88	Nebraska	13–18	4–10	T–6th	
1988–89	Nebraska	17–16	4–10	7th	
1989–90	Nebraska	10–18	3–11	7th	
1990–91	Nebraska	26–8	9–5	3rd	NCAA Division I First Round
1991–92	Nebraska	19–10	7–7	5th	NCAA Division I First Round
1992–93	Nebraska	20–11	8–6	T–2nd	NCAA Division I First Round
1993–94	Nebraska	20–10	7–7	4th	NCAA Division I First Round
1994–95	Nebraska	18–14	4–10	7th	NIT Second Round
1995–96	Nebraska	21–14	4–10	7th	NIT champion
Nebraska Cornhuskers (Big 12 Conference) (1996–2000)
1996–97	Nebraska	18–15	7–9	T–7th	NIT Quarterfinal
1997–98	Nebraska	20–12	10–6	4th	NCAA Division I First Round
1998–99	Nebraska	20–13	10–6	T–5th	NIT Second Round
1999–00	Nebraska	11–19	4–12	T–8th	
Nebraska:		254–190 (.572)	88–116 (.431)		
Robert Morris Colonials (Northeast Conference) (2000–2001)
2000–01	Robert Morris	7–22	7–13	T–9th	
Robert Morris:		7–22 (.241)	7–13 (.350)		
Duquesne Dukes (Atlantic 10 Conference) (2001–2006)
2001–02	Duquesne	9–19	4–12	6th (West)	
2002–03	Duquesne	9–21	3–13	6th (West)	
2003–04	Duquesne	12–17	6–10	5th (West)	
2004–05	Duquesne	8–22	5–11	T–5th (West)	
2005–06	Duquesne	3–24	1–15	14th	
Duquesne:		41–103 (.285)	19–61 (.238)		
Merchant Marine Mariners (Landmark Conference) (2010–2014)
2010–11	Merchant Marine	14–12	8–6	4th	
2011–12	Merchant Marine	12–13	7–7	T–4th	
2012–13	Merchant Marine	14–12	7–7	4th	
2013–14	Merchant Marine	12–14	6–8	T–4th	
Merchant Marine:		52–51 (.505)	28–28 (.500)		
Total:		461–433 (.516)			
National champion Postseason invitational champion Conference regular season champion Conference regular season and conference tournament champion Division regular season champion Division regular season and conference tournament champion Conference tournament champion
