= 1993–94 Arizona Wildcats men's basketball team =

American college basketball season

1993–94 Arizona Wildcats men's basketball

Pac-10 Regular-Season Champions

NCAA Tournament, Final Four
- Conference: Pacific-10 Conference

Ranking
- Coaches: No. 3
- AP: No. 9
- Record: 29–6 (14–4 Pac-10)
- Head coach: Lute Olson (11th season)
- Assistant coaches: Jim Rosborough (5th season); Jessie Evans (6th season); Phil Johnson (1st season)
- Home arena: McKale Center

1993–94 Pacific-10 Conference men's basketball standings
	Conf.				Overall
Team	W		L	PCT	W		L	PCT
No. 9 Arizona	14	–	4	.778	29	–	6	.829
No. 17 UCLA	13	–	5	.722	21	–	7	.750
No. 16 California	13	–	5	.722	22	–	8	.733
Washington State	10	–	8	.556	20	–	11	.645
Stanford	10	–	8	.556	17	–	11	.607
Arizona State	10	–	8	.556	15	–	13	.536
USC	9	–	9	.500	16	–	12	.571
Oregon	6	–	12	.333	10	–	17	.370
Washington	3	–	15	.167	5	–	22	.185
Oregon State	2	–	16	.111	6	–	21	.222
Rankings from AP Poll

The 1993–94 Arizona Wildcats men's basketball team represented the University of Arizona. The team's head coach was Lute Olson. The team played its home games in McKale Center as members of the Pacific-10 Conference.

After going 14–4 to win the Pac-10 regular-season title the team was seeded second in the West region of the NCAA tournament. They advanced to the Final Four with a 92–72 victory over top-seeded Missouri before falling 91–82 to Arkansas, who would go on to win the championship. The team finished with a record of 29–6.

== Roster ==
1993–94 Arizona Wildcats men's basketball team
Players
Coaches

Pos.	#	Name	Height	Weight	Year	Hometown
G	3	Khalid Reeves	6 ft 3 in (1.91 m)	195 lb (88 kg)	Sr	Queens, New York
G	20	Damon Stoudamire	5 ft 10 in (1.78 m)	165 lb (75 kg)	Jr	Portland, Oregon
F	22	Ray Owes	6 ft 9 in (2.06 m)	215 lb (98 kg)	Jr	San Bernardino, California
G	44	Reggie Geary	6 ft 2 in (1.88 m)	180 lb (82 kg)	So	Santa Ana, California
F/C	50	Joseph Blair	6 ft 11 in (2.11 m)	260 lb (118 kg)	So	Houston, Texas

Head coach

- Lute Olson (Augsburg)

Assistant coach(es)

Legend

- (C) Team captain
- (S) Suspended
- (I) Ineligible
- (W) Walk-on
- Injured
- Current redshirt

== Schedule and results ==
Date time, TV	Rank^{#}	Opponent^{#}	Result	Record	Site city, state
Non-conference regular season
Nov 29, 1993*	No. 19	Baylor	W 106–79	1–0	McKale Center; Tucson, Arizona
Dec 1, 1993*	No. 19	Saint Joseph's	W 93–73	2–0	McKale Center; Tucson, Arizona
Dec 5, 1993*	No. 19	vs. No. 8 Oklahoma State	W 97–84	3–0	America West Arena (9,817); Phoenix, Arizona
Dec 9, 1993*	No. 14	at Utah	W 88–81	4–0	Jon M. Huntsman Center; Salt Lake City, Utah
Dec 14, 1993*	No. 13	New Orleans	W 80–62	5–0	McKale Center; Tucson, Arizona
Dec 18, 1993*	No. 13	at Santa Clara	W 89–63	6–0	Leavey Center; Santa Clara, California
Dec 21, 1993*	No. 12	vs. Notre Dame; Maui Invitational Tournament	W 98–79	7–0	Lahaina Civic Center; Lahaina, Hawaii
Dec 22, 1993*	No. 12	vs. No. 18 Boston College; Maui Invitational Tournament	W 70–65	8–0	Lahaina Civic Center; Lahaina, Hawaii
Dec 23, 1993*	No. 12	vs. No. 5 Kentucky; Maui Invitational Tournament	L 92–93	8–1	Lahaina Civic Center; Lahaina, Hawaii
Dec 28, 1993*	No. 12	Fordham	W 111–84	9–1	McKale Center; Tucson, Arizona
Dec 29, 1993*	No. 12	No. 7 Michigan	W 119–95	10–1	McKale Center; Tucson, Arizona
Pac-10 Regular season
Jan 5, 1994	No. 9	Arizona State	W 98–81	11–1 (1–0)	McKale Center; Tucson, Arizona
Jan 8, 1994*	No. 9	No. 25 Marquette	W 94–80	12–1	McKale Center; Tucson, Arizona
Jan 13, 1994	No. 6	No. 19 California	L 93–98	12–2 (1–1)	McKale Center; Tucson, Arizona
Jan 15, 1994	No. 6	Stanford	W 89–72	13–2 (2–1)	McKale Center; Tucson, Arizona
Jan 20, 1994	No. 9	at No. 2 UCLA	L 66–74	13–3 (2–2)	Pauley Pavilion; Los Angeles, California
Jan 22, 1994	No. 9	at USC	W 83–74	14–3 (3–2)	L.A. Sports Arena; Los Angeles, California
Jan 27, 1994	No. 13	Oregon	W 98–86	15–3 (4–2)	McKale Center; Tucson, Arizona
Jan 29, 1994	No. 13	Oregon State	W 100–56	16–3 (5–2)	McKale Center; Tucson, Arizona
Feb 3, 1994	No. 12	at Washington State	W 80–68	17–3 (6–2)	Friel Court; Pullman, Washington
Feb 5, 1994	No. 12	Washington	L 69–74	17–4 (6–3)	McKale Center; Tucson, Arizona
Feb 10, 1994	No. 16	at Stanford	W 77–60	18–4 (7–3)	Maples Pavilion; Stanford, California
Feb 13, 1994	No. 16	at No. 18 California	W 96–77	19–4 (8–3)	Harmon Gym; Berkeley, California
Feb 17, 1994	No. 15	USC	W 94–61	20–4 (9–3)	McKale Center; Tucson, Arizona
Feb 19, 1994	No. 15	No. 8 UCLA	W 98–74	21–4 (10–3)	McKale Center; Tucson, Arizona
Feb 24, 1994	No. 9	at Oregon State	W 96–69	22–4 (11–3)	Gill Coliseum; Corvallis, Oregon
Feb 26, 1994	No. 9	at Oregon	W 75–71	23–4 (12–3)	McArthur Court; Eugene, Oregon
Mar 3, 1994	No. 8	Washington	W 95–62	24–4 (13–3)	McKale Center; Tucson, Arizona
Mar 5, 1994	No. 8	Washington State	W 85–69	25–4 (14–3)	McKale Center; Tucson, Arizona
Mar 12, 1994	No. 7	at Arizona State	L 87–94	25–5 (14–4)	Wells Fargo Arena; Tempe, Arizona
NCAA Tournament
Mar 18, 1994*	(2 W) No. 9	vs. (15 W) Loyola (MD); First round	W 81–55	26–5	ARCO Arena; Sacramento, California
Mar 20, 1994*	(2 W) No. 9	vs. (7 W) Virginia; Second Round	W 71–58	27–5	ARCO Arena; Sacramento, California
Mar 24, 1994*	(2 W) No. 9	vs. (3 W) No. 10 Louisville; West Regional semifinal – Sweet Sixteen	W 82–70	28–5	L.A. Sports Arena; Los Angeles, California
Mar 26, 1994*	(2 W) No. 9	vs. (1 W) No. 5 Missouri; West Regional Final – Elite Eight	W 92–72	29–5	L.A. Sports Arena; Los Angeles, California
Apr 2, 1994*	(2 W) No. 9	vs. (1 MW) No. 2 Arkansas; National semifinal – Final Four	L 82–91	29–6	Charlotte Coliseum; Charlotte, North Carolina
*Non-conference game. ^{#}Rankings from AP Poll. (#) Tournament seedings in parentheses. W=West.

=== NCAA basketball tournament ===
- Mideast
  - Arizona (#2 seed) 81, Loyola (#15 Seed) 55
  - Arizona 71, Virginia (#7 Seed) 58
  - Arizona 82, Louisville (#3 seed) 70
  - Arizona 92, Missouri (#1 seed) 72

- Final Four
  - Arkansas 91, Arizona 82

== Awards and honors ==
- Khalid Reeves – Consensus Second-team All-American
- Damon Stoudamire – Honorable mention All-American (AP)

== Team players drafted into the NBA ==
Round	Pick	Player	NBA Team
1	12	Khalid Reeves	Miami Heat
