= 1993–94 Kentucky Wildcats men's basketball team =

1993–94 season of University of Kentucky men's basketball team

1993–94 Kentucky Wildcats men's basketball
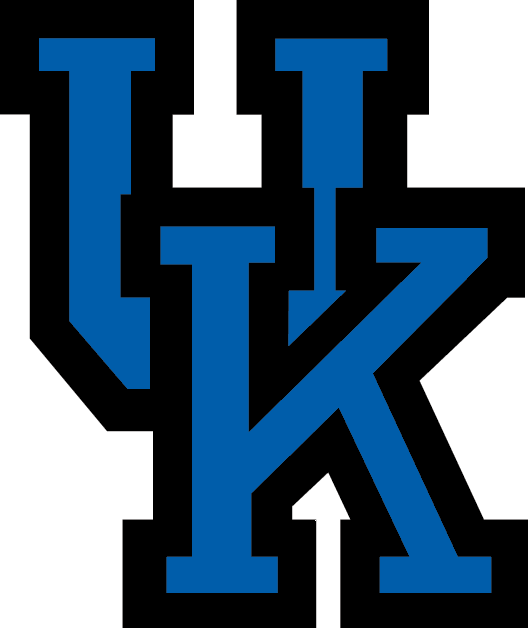

SEC tournament champions Maui Invitational champions

NCAA tournament, Round of 32
- Conference: Southeastern Conference

Ranking
- Coaches: No. 13
- AP: No. 7
- Record: 27–7 (12–4 SEC)
- Head coach: Rick Pitino (5th season)
- Assistant coaches: Billy Donovan; Bernadette Locke-Mattox; Delray Brooks
- Home arena: Rupp Arena

1993–94 Southeastern Conference men's basketball standings
	Conf.				Overall
Team	W		L	PCT	W		L	PCT
East
No. 14 Florida	12	–	4	.750	29	–	8	.784
No. 7 Kentucky †	12	–	4	.750	27	–	7	.794
Vanderbilt	9	–	7	.563	20	–	12	.625
Georgia	7	–	9	.438	14	–	16	.467
South Carolina	4	–	12	.250	9	–	19	.321
Tennessee	2	–	14	.125	5	–	22	.185
West
No. 2 Arkansas	14	–	2	.875	31	–	3	.912
Alabama	12	–	4	.750	20	–	10	.667
Mississippi State	9	–	7	.563	18	–	11	.621
Ole Miss	7	–	9	.438	14	–	13	.519
LSU	5	–	11	.313	11	–	16	.407
Auburn	3	–	13	.188	11	–	17	.393
† 1994 SEC tournament winner Rankings from AP Poll

The 1993–94 Kentucky Wildcats men's basketball team represented University of Kentucky. The head coach was Rick Pitino. The team was a member of the Southeastern Conference and played their home games at Rupp Arena. Kentucky finished with an overall record of 27–7 (12–4 SEC). The team was invited to the 1994 NCAA Tournament as a #3 seed and advanced to the round of 32 before losing to Marquette 75–63.

== Roster ==
1993–94 Kentucky Wildcats men's basketball team
Players
Coaches

Pos.	#	Name	Height	Weight	Year	Previous school	Hometown
G	00	Tony Delk	6 ft 1 in (1.85 m)	—	So	Brownsville, TN
PG	5	Travis Ford	5 ft 9 in (1.75 m)	165 lb (75 kg)	Sr	Madisonville North Hopkins	Madisonville, Kentucky
G	15	Jeff Sheppard	6 ft 4 in (1.93 m)	—	Fr	Peachtree City, GA
F	40	Walter McCarty	6 ft 11 in (2.11 m)	—	Fr	Evansville, IN

Head coach

- Rick Pitino (UMass)

Assistant coach(es)

Legend

- (C) Team captain
- (S) Suspended
- (I) Ineligible
- (W) Walk-on
- Injured
- Current redshirt

== Schedule and results ==
Date time, TV	Rank^{#}	Opponent^{#}	Result	Record	Site (attendance) city, state
Non-conference regular season
Nov 27, 1993*; 2:45 p.m., CBS		No. 7 Louisville	W 78–70	1–0	Rupp Arena; Lexington, Kentucky
Dec 1, 1993*; 8:00 p.m., UKTV		Tennessee Tech	W 115–77	2–0	Rupp Arena; Lexington, Kentucky
Dec 4, 1993*; 3:45 p.m., CBS		vs. No. 21 Indiana	L 84–96	2–1	RCA Dome; Indianapolis, Indiana
Dec 8, 1993*; 8:00 p.m., UKTV		Eastern Kentucky	W 107–78	3–1	Rupp Arena; Lexington, Kentucky
Dec 17, 1993*; 8:00 p.m., UKTV		Morehead State	W 97–61	4–1	Rupp Arena; Lexington, Kentucky
Dec 21, 1993*		vs. Texas; Maui Invitational Tournament	W 86–61	5–1	Lahaina Civic Center; Lahaina, Hawaii
Dec 22, 1993*		vs. Ohio State; Maui Invitational Tournament	W 100–88	6–1	Lahaina Civic Center; Lahaina, Hawaii
Dec 23, 1993*		vs. No. 13 Arizona; Maui Invitational Tournament	W 93–92	7–1	Lahaina Civic Center; Lahaina, Hawaii
Dec 28, 1993; 8:00 p.m., UKTV		at San Francisco	W 110-83	8-1	Rupp Arena; Lexington, Kentucky
Dec 31, 1993; 8:00 p.m., UKTV		at Robert Morris	W 92-67	9-1	Rupp Arena; Lexington, Kentucky
SEC regular season
Feb 19, 1994; 2:00 p.m., JP Sports		at Vanderbilt	W 107-82		Memorial Gymnasium; Nashville, Tennessee
Feb 23, 1994; 7:00 p.m., JP Sports		at Tennessee			Thompson Boiling Arena; Knoxville, Tennessee
Feb 27, 1994; 1:00 p.m., JP Sports		at Georgia			Rupp Arena; Lexington, Kentucky
Mar 2, 1994; 8:00 p.m., JP Sports		at Florida	W 80–77	22–6 (11–4)	Rupp Arena; Lexington, Kentucky
Mar 5, 1994; 2:00 p.m., JP Sports		at South Carolina	L 74–75	22–7 (11–5)	Carolina Coliseum; Columbia, South Carolina
SEC tournament
Mar 11, 1994*; JP Sports	No. 10	vs. Mississippi State; Quarterfinals	W 95–76	24–6	Pyramid Arena; Memphis, Tennessee
Mar 12, 1994*; 3:30 p.m., JP Sports	No. 10	vs. No. 1 Arkansas; Semifinals	W 90–78	25–6	Pyramid Arena; Memphis, Tennessee
Mar 13, 1994*; JP Sports	No. 10	vs. No. 17 Florida; Championship game	W 73–60	26–6	Pyramid Arena; Memphis, Tennessee
NCAA tournament
Mar 18, 1994*; CBS	(3 SE) No. 7	vs. (14 SE) Tennessee State; First round	W 83–70	27–6	Tropicana Field; St. Petersburg, Florida
Mar 20, 1994*; CBS	(3 SE) No. 7	vs. (6 SE) No. 21 Marquette; Second round	L 63–75	27–7	Tropicana Field; St. Petersburg, Florida
*Non-conference game. ^{#}Rankings from AP Poll. (#) Tournament seedings in parentheses. SE=Southeast. All times are in Eastern.

=== NCAA tournament ===
Seeding in brackets

- Southeast
  - Kentucky (3) 83, Tennessee State (14) 70
  - Marquette (6) 75, Kentucky 63

== Awards and honors ==
- Travis Ford, Second Team, 1994-1995 All-SEC (AP and Coaches)
- Tony Delk, Second Team, 1994-1995 All-SEC (Coaches, Third Team AP)
- Rodrick Rhodes, Third Team, 1994-1995 All-SEC (AP and Coaches)

== Team players drafted into the NBA ==
Round	Pick	Player	NBA club
2	31	Rodney Dent	Orlando Magic
