= 1993–94 Washington State Cougars men's basketball team =

American college basketball season

1993–94 Washington State Cougars men's basketball

NCAA tournament, First round
- Conference: Pacific-10 Conference
- Record: 20–11 (10–8 Pac-10)
- Head coach: Kelvin Sampson (7th season)
- Assistant coaches: Jason Rabedeaux; Ray Lopes; Bobby Champagne
- Home arena: Beasley Coliseum

1993–94 Pacific-10 Conference men's basketball standings
	Conf.				Overall
Team	W		L	PCT	W		L	PCT
No. 9 Arizona	14	–	4	.778	29	–	6	.829
No. 17 UCLA	13	–	5	.722	21	–	7	.750
No. 16 California	13	–	5	.722	22	–	8	.733
Washington State	10	–	8	.556	20	–	11	.645
Stanford	10	–	8	.556	17	–	11	.607
Arizona State	10	–	8	.556	15	–	13	.536
USC	9	–	9	.500	16	–	12	.571
Oregon	6	–	12	.333	10	–	17	.370
Washington	3	–	15	.167	5	–	22	.185
Oregon State	2	–	16	.111	6	–	21	.222
Rankings from AP Poll

The 1993–94 Washington State Cougars men's basketball team represented Washington State University for the 1993–94 NCAA Division I men's basketball season. Led by seventh-year head coach Kelvin Sampson, the Cougars were members of the Pacific-10 Conference and played their home games on campus at Beasley Coliseum in Pullman, Washington.

The Cougars were 20–10 overall in the regular season and 10–8 in conference play, tied for fourth in the standings. There was no conference tournament this season; last played in 1990, it resumed in 2002.

For the first time in eleven years, WSU was invited to the 64-team NCAA tournament. Seeded eighth in the East region, they met ninth seed Boston College in the first round in Landover, Maryland, but lost by three points.

This was Sampson's last season in Pullman; he left in late April for Oklahoma of the Big Eight Conference. The next head coach was Kevin Eastman, who previously led UNC Wilmington.

WSU's next NCAA appearance was thirteen years away in 2007, under head coach Tony Bennett.

== Postseason results ==
Date time, TV	Rank^{#}	Opponent^{#}	Result	Record	Site (attendance) city, state
NCAA tournament
Fri, March 18*; 11:40 am, CBS	(8E)	vs. (9E) Boston College; First round	L 64–67	20–11	USAir Arena; Landover, Maryland
*Non-conference game. ^{#}Rankings from AP poll. (#) Tournament seedings in parentheses. All times are in Pacific time.
