= 1993–94 Tennessee State Tigers basketball team =

American college basketball season

1993–94 Tennessee State Tigers basketball

OVC tournament champions

NCAA tournament
- Conference: Ohio Valley Conference
- Record: 19–12 (12–4 OVC)
- Head coach: Frankie Allen (3rd season)
- Home arena: Gentry Complex

1993–94 Ohio Valley Conference men's basketball standings
	Conf.				Overall
Team	W		L	PCT	W		L	PCT
Murray State	15	–	1	.938	23	–	6	.793
Tennessee State †	12	–	4	.750	19	–	12	.613
Austin Peay	10	–	6	.625	11	–	16	.407
Eastern Kentucky	9	–	7	.563	13	–	14	.481
Morehead State	8	–	8	.500	14	–	14	.500
Tennessee Tech	5	–	11	.313	10	–	21	.323
Middle Tennessee	5	–	11	.313	8	–	19	.296
Southeast Missouri State	5	–	11	.313	10	–	17	.370
UT Martin	3	–	13	.188	5	–	22	.185
† 1994 OVC tournament winner Rankings from AP Poll

The 1993–94 Tennessee State Tigers basketball team represented Tennessee State University as a member of the Ohio Valley Conference during the 1993–94 NCAA Division I men's basketball season. The Tigers, led by third-year head coach Frankie Allen, played their home games at the Gentry Complex in Nashville, Tennessee as members of the Ohio Valley Conference. After finishing second in the OVC regular season standings, the Tigers repeated as OVC tournament champs to secure the conference's automatic bid to the NCAA tournament – the school's second straight, and most recent, appearance in the Big Dance. Playing as No. 14 seed in the Southeast region, Tennessee State was beaten by No. 3 seed Kentucky, 83–70.

== Roster ==
1993–94 Tennessee State Tigers men's basketball team
Players	Coaches
Pos. / # / Name / Height / Weight / Year / Hometown; C / / Carlos Rogers / 6 ft 10 in (2.08 m) / 215 lb (98 kg) / Sr	Head coach: Frankie Allen (Roanoke); Assistant coach(es) Legend: (C) Team captain; (S) Suspended; (I) Ineligible; (W) Walk-on; Injured; Current redshirt; Roster

== Schedule and results ==
Date time, TV	Rank^{#}	Opponent^{#}	Result	Record	Site (attendance) city, state
Non-conference regular season
Dec 1, 1993*		at No. 23 Cincinnati	L 70–79	0–2	Myrl H. Shoemaker Center; Cincinnati, Ohio
OVC regular season
Feb 21, 1994		Tennessee Tech	W 94–85	16–10 (12–4)	Gentry Center Complex; Nashville, Tennessee
Feb 23, 1994*		at Alabama	L 62–66	16–11	Coleman Coliseum; Tuscaloosa, Alabama
Ohio Valley tournament
Mar 3, 1994*		Middle Tennessee; Quarterfinals	W 61–60	17–11	Nashville Municipal Auditorium; Nashville, Tennessee
Mar 4, 1994*		Tennessee Tech; Semifinals	W 91–74	18–11	Nashville Municipal Auditorium; Nashville, Tennessee
Mar 5, 1994*		Murray State; Championship game	W 73–72	19–11	Nashville Municipal Auditorium; Nashville, Tennessee
NCAA tournament
Mar 18, 1994*		vs. No. 7 Kentucky; First round	L 70–83	19–12	Tropicana Field; St. Petersburg, Florida
*Non-conference game. ^{#}Rankings from AP Poll. (#) Tournament seedings in parentheses. SE=Southeast. All times are in Central.
