= 1993–94 Washington Huskies men's basketball team =

American college basketball season

1993–94 Washington Huskies men's basketball
- Conference: Pacific-10 Conference
- Record: 5–22 (3–15 Pac-10)
- Head coach: Bob Bender (1st season)
- Assistant coaches: Ray Giacoletti; Ritchie McKay
- Home arena: Hec Edmundson Pavilion

1993–94 Pacific-10 Conference men's basketball standings
	Conf.				Overall
Team	W		L	PCT	W		L	PCT
No. 9 Arizona	14	–	4	.778	29	–	6	.829
No. 17 UCLA	13	–	5	.722	21	–	7	.750
No. 16 California	13	–	5	.722	22	–	8	.733
Washington State	10	–	8	.556	20	–	11	.645
Stanford	10	–	8	.556	17	–	11	.607
Arizona State	10	–	8	.556	15	–	13	.536
USC	9	–	9	.500	16	–	12	.571
Oregon	6	–	12	.333	10	–	17	.370
Washington	3	–	15	.167	5	–	22	.185
Oregon State	2	–	16	.111	6	–	21	.222
Rankings from AP Poll

The 1993–94 Washington Huskies men's basketball team represented the University of Washington for the 1993–94 NCAA Division I men's basketball season. Led by first-year head coach Bob Bender, the Huskies were members of the Pacific-10 Conference and played their home games on campus at Hec Edmundson Pavilion in Seattle, Washington.

The Huskies were 5–22 overall in the regular season and 3–15 in conference play, ninth in the standings. Although swept by Northwest rivals Oregon and Washington State, the Huskies' big win of the season was an upset of #12 Arizona, the Wildcats won the Pac-10 title and advanced to the Final Four. There was no conference tournament this season; last played in 1990, it resumed in 2002.

Bender was hired in April 1993; he was previously the head coach at Illinois State.
