= John Devereaux =

American basketball player (born 1962)

Personal information
- Born: January 17, 1962 (age 64) Brooklyn, New York, U.S.
- Listed height: 6 ft 8 in (2.03 m)
- Listed weight: 230 lb (104 kg)

Career information
- High school: Abraham Lincoln (Brooklyn, New York)
- College: Ohio (1980–1984)
- NBA draft: 1984: 4th round, 78th overall pick
- Drafted by: San Antonio Spurs
- Playing career: 1984–1998
- Position: Power forward

Career history
- 1984–1985: Varese
- 1985–1986: Aurora Desio
- 1986: Jersey Jammers
- 1987–1988: TSV Bayer 04 Leverkusen
- 1988–1989: CB Valladolid
- 1989–1991: Cholet Basket
- 1991: A.P.U. Udine
- 1991–1992: Columbus Horizon
- 1992: Hasselt
- 1992–1993: ASA Sceaux
- 1993–1995: Regatas San Nicolás
- 1995–1996: Atlético Peñarol
- 1997–1998: Obras Sanitarias

Career highlights
- MAC Player of the Year (1984); 2× First-team All-MAC (1983, 1984)
- Stats at Basketball Reference

John Devereaux (born January 17, 1962) is an American former basketball player. He had a long professional career in Europe, where he played in the top leagues in Spain, Italy, France and Germany. He played college basketball at Ohio University, where as a senior he was named the Mid-American Conference Player of the Year.

Devereaux committed to Ohio out of Abraham Lincoln High School in Brooklyn, where he did not play until his junior year. He developed into a top player in the Mid-American Conference (MAC), named honorable mention all-conference as a sophomore, then first-team All-MAC as a junior and senior. He was also named MAC Player of the Year in his senior year. For his career at Ohio, he averaged 13.3 points and 8.5 rebounds for his Bobcat career.

Following the close of his college career, Devereaux was drafted by the San Antonio Spurs in the fourth round of the 1984 NBA draft (78th pick overall). He did not play in the NBA, but did have a successful career in Europe. He also played minor league basketball in the United States in the United States Basketball League for the Jersey Jammers and the Continental Basketball Association for the Columbus Horizon.
