= 1995–96 Georgia Tech Yellow Jackets men's basketball team =

American college basketball season

1995–96 Georgia Tech Yellow Jackets men's basketball

ACC Regular season champion

NCAA tournament, Sweet Sixteen
- Conference: Atlantic Coast Conference

Ranking
- Coaches: No. 13
- AP: No. 13
- Record: 24–12 (13–3 ACC)
- Head coach: Bobby Cremins (15th season)
- Home arena: Alexander Memorial Coliseum and the Omni Coliseum

1995–96 ACC men's basketball standings
	Conf.				Overall
Team	W		L	PCT	W		L	PCT
No. 13 Georgia Tech	13	–	3	.813	24	–	12	.667
No. 9 Wake Forest †	12	–	4	.750	26	–	6	.813
No. 25 North Carolina	10	–	6	.625	21	–	11	.656
Duke	8	–	8	.500	18	–	13	.581
Maryland	8	–	8	.500	17	–	13	.567
Clemson	7	–	9	.438	18	–	11	.621
Virginia	6	–	10	.375	12	–	15	.444
Florida State	5	–	11	.313	13	–	14	.481
NC State	3	–	13	.188	15	–	16	.484
† 1996 ACC tournament winner Rankings from AP poll

The 1995–96 Georgia Tech Yellow Jackets men's basketball team represented the Georgia Institute of Technology as a member of the Atlantic Coast Conference during the 1995–96 NCAA men's basketball season. Led by 15th year head coach Bobby Cremins, the Yellow Jackets reached the Sweet Sixteen of the NCAA tournament.

== Roster ==
1995–96 Georgia Tech Yellow Jackets men's basketball team
Players
Coaches

Pos.	#	Name	Height	Weight	Year	Hometown
G	3	Stephon Marbury	6 ft 2 in (1.88 m)	195 lb (88 kg)	Fr	Brooklyn, New York
SF	15	Matt Harpring	6 ft 7 in (2.01 m)	220 lb (100 kg)	So	Atlanta, Georgia
G	10	Drew Barry	6 ft 5 in (1.96 m)	185 lb (84 kg)	Sr	Concord, California

Head coach

- Bobby Cremins (South Carolina)

Assistant coach(es)

Legend

- (C) Team captain
- (S) Suspended
- (I) Ineligible
- (W) Walk-on
- Injured
- Current redshirt

== Schedule ==
Date time, TV	Rank^{#}	Opponent^{#}	Result	Record	Site city, state
Non-conference regular season
Nov 15, 1995*		Manhattan	W 87–67	1–0	The Omni; Atlanta, Georgia
Nov 17, 1995*		Oklahoma	W 83–72	2–0	The Omni; Atlanta, Georgia
Nov 22, 1995*	No. 25	vs. No. 5 Georgetown	L 72–94	2–1	Madison Square Garden; New York, New York
Nov 24, 1995*	No. 25	vs. No. 16 Michigan	W 77–61	3–1	Madison Square Garden; New York, New York
Nov 27, 1995*	No. 20	Campbell	W 87–76	4–1	The Omni; Atlanta, Georgia
Dec 2, 1995*	No. 20	at Appalachian State	W 89–65	5–1	Varsity Gymnasium; Boone, North Carolina
Dec 9, 1995*	No. 16	at No. 5 Kentucky	L 60–83	5–2	Rupp Arena; Lexington, Kentucky
Dec 13, 1995*	No. 19	at Georgia	L 70–94	5–3	Stegeman Coliseum; Athens, Georgia
Dec 16, 1995*	No. 19	No. 20 Louisville	W 88–77	6–3	The Omni; Atlanta, Georgia
Dec 18, 1995*	No. 21	Mount St. Mary's	L 69–71	6–4	The Omni; Atlanta, Georgia
Dec 22, 1995*	No. 21	vs. No. 2 UMass; Jimmy V Classic	L 67–75	6–5	Brendan Byrne Arena (13,452); East Rutherford, New Jersey
Dec 29, 1995*		vs. Bradley; Cable Car Classic	L 82–84	6–6	San Jose Arena; San Jose, California
Dec 30, 1995*		vs. Santa Clara; Cable Car Classic	L 66–71	6–7	San Jose Arena; San Jose, California
ACC regular season
Jan 3, 1996		Maryland	W 98–84	7–7 (1–0)	The Omni; Atlanta, Georgia
Jan 7, 1996		at No. 19 Duke	W 86–81	8–7 (2–0)	Cameron Indoor Stadium; Durham, North Carolina
Jan 10, 1996		No. 10 North Carolina	W 80–77	9–7 (3–0)	The Omni; Atlanta, Georgia
Jan 13, 1996*		Western Carolina	W 91–78	10–7	The Omni; Atlanta, Georgia
Jan 17, 1996		at No. 6 Wake Forest	L 63–66	10–8 (3–1)	Lawrence Joel Coliseum; Winston-Salem, North Carolina
Jan 20, 1996		Virginia	W 90–70	11–8 (4–1)	The Omni; Atlanta, Georgia
Jan 24, 1996		at NC State	W 76–71	12–8 (5–1)	Reynolds Coliseum; Raleigh, North Carolina
Jan 27, 1996		Florida State	W 79–58	13–8 (6–1)	Alexander Memorial Coliseum; Atlanta, Georgia
Jan 30, 1996		at No. 24 Clemson	L 70–73	13–9 (6–2)	Littlejohn Coliseum; Clemson, South Carolina
Feb 3, 1996		at Maryland	L 74–88	13–10 (6–3)	Cole Fieldhouse; College Park, Maryland
Feb 7, 1996		Duke	W 73–71 ^{OT}	14–10 (7–3)	Alexander Memorial Coliseum; Atlanta, Georgia
Feb 10, 1996		at No. 12 North Carolina	W 92–83 ^{OT}	15–10 (8–3)	Dean Smith Center; Chapel Hill, North Carolina
Feb 17, 1996		No. 8 Wake Forest	W 64–63	16–10 (9–3)	Alexander Memorial Coliseum; Atlanta, Georgia
Feb 21, 1996	No. 23	at Virginia	W 84–75	17–10 (10–3)	University Hall; Charlottesville, Virginia
Feb 25, 1996	No. 23	NC State	W 92–83 ^{OT}	18–10 (11–3)	Alexander Memorial Coliseum; Atlanta, Georgia
Feb 28, 1996	No. 18	at Florida State	W 83–68	19–10 (12–3)	Donald L. Tucker Center; Tallahassee, Florida
Mar 3, 1996	No. 18	Clemson	W 87–74	20–10 (13–3)	Alexander Memorial Coliseum; Atlanta, Georgia
ACC tournament
Mar 8, 1996*	No. 18	at NC State; Quarterfinals	W 88–73	21–10	Greensboro Coliseum; Greensboro, North Carolina
Mar 9, 1996*	No. 18	vs. Maryland; Semifinals	W 84–79	22–10	Greensboro Coliseum; Greensboro, North Carolina
Mar 10, 1996*	No. 18	at No. 12 Wake Forest; Championship Game	L 74–75	22–11	Greensboro Coliseum; Greensboro, North Carolina
NCAA tournament
Mar 15, 1996*	(3 SE) No. 13	vs. (14 SE) Austin Peay; Second Round	W 90–79	23–11	Amway Arena; Orlando, Florida
Mar 17, 1996*	(3 SE) No. 13	vs. (11 SE) Boston College; Second Round	W 103–89	24–11	Amway Arena; Orlando, Florida
Mar 22, 1996*	(3 SE) No. 13	vs. (2 SE) No. 7 Cincinnati; Southeast Regional semifinal – Sweet Sixteen	L 70–87	24–12	Rupp Arena; Lexington, Kentucky
*Non-conference game. ^{#}Rankings from AP poll. (#) Tournament seedings in parentheses. SE=Southeast. All times are in Eastern Time.

== Players in the 1996 NBA draft ==
Round	Pick	Player	NBA club
1	4	Stephon Marbury	Minnesota Timberwolves
2	57	Drew Barry	Seattle SuperSonics
