= 1996 ACC men's basketball tournament =

- Classification: Division I
- Season: 1995–96
- Teams: 9
- Site: Greensboro, North Carolina; Greensboro Coliseum
- Champions: Wake Forest (4th title)
- Winning coach: Dave Odom (2nd title)
- MVP: Tim Duncan (Wake Forest)

1995–96 ACC men's basketball standings
	Conf.				Overall
Team	W		L	PCT	W		L	PCT
No. 13 Georgia Tech	13	–	3	.813	24	–	12	.667
No. 9 Wake Forest †	12	–	4	.750	26	–	6	.813
No. 25 North Carolina	10	–	6	.625	21	–	11	.656
Duke	8	–	8	.500	18	–	13	.581
Maryland	8	–	8	.500	17	–	13	.567
Clemson	7	–	9	.438	18	–	11	.621
Virginia	6	–	10	.375	12	–	15	.444
Florida State	5	–	11	.313	13	–	14	.481
NC State	3	–	13	.188	15	–	16	.484
† 1996 ACC tournament winner Rankings from AP poll

The 1996 Atlantic Coast Conference men's basketball tournament took place from March 7 to 10 at the Greensboro Coliseum in Greensboro, North Carolina. Wake Forest won its second consecutive tournament, defeating Georgia Tech, 75–74, in the title game. Tim Duncan of Wake Forest was named tournament MVP.

== Bracket ==
First round March 7
8	Florida State	65
9	NC State	80

Quarterfinals; March 8
1	#18 Georgia Tech	88
9	NC State	73
4	Duke	69
5	Maryland	82
2	#12 Wake Forest	70
7	Virginia	60
3	#20 North Carolina	73
6	Clemson	75

Semifinals; March 9
1	#18 Georgia Tech	84
5	Maryland	79
2	#12 Wake Forest	68
6	Clemson	60

Championship Game; March 10
1	#18 Georgia Tech	74
2	#12 Wake Forest	75

AP rankings at time of tournament

== Awards and honors ==
=== Everett Case Award ===
Player	School
Tim Duncan	Wake Forest

=== All Tournament Teams ===
==== First Team ====
Player	School
Greg Buckner	Clemson
Tim Duncan	Wake Forest
Matt Harpring	Georgia Tech
Stephon Marbury	Georgia Tech
Tony Rutland	Wake Forest
