= 1995–96 Maryland Terrapins men's basketball team =

American college basketball season

1995–96 Maryland Terrapins men's basketball

NCAA tournament, First Round
- Conference: Atlantic Coast Conference
- Record: 17–13 (8–8 ACC)
- Head coach: Gary Williams (7th season)
- Assistant coaches: Billy Hahn; Jimmy Patsos
- Home arena: Cole Field House

1995–96 ACC men's basketball standings
	Conf.				Overall
Team	W		L	PCT	W		L	PCT
No. 13 Georgia Tech	13	–	3	.813	24	–	12	.667
No. 9 Wake Forest †	12	–	4	.750	26	–	6	.813
No. 25 North Carolina	10	–	6	.625	21	–	11	.656
Duke	8	–	8	.500	18	–	13	.581
Maryland	8	–	8	.500	17	–	13	.567
Clemson	7	–	9	.438	18	–	11	.621
Virginia	6	–	10	.375	12	–	15	.444
Florida State	5	–	11	.313	13	–	14	.481
NC State	3	–	13	.188	15	–	16	.484
† 1996 ACC tournament winner Rankings from AP poll

The 1995–96 Maryland Terrapins men's basketball team represented the University of Maryland in the 1995–1996 college basketball season as a member of the Atlantic Coast Conference (ACC). The team was led by head coach Gary Williams and played their home games at the Cole Field House. The team finished 17–13, 8–8 in ACC play and lost in the semifinals of the ACC tournament to Georgia Tech. The Terps received an at-large bid as the No. 7 seed in the West region of the 1996 NCAA tournament, where they lost to Santa Clara, led by Steve Nash (28 points), in the opening round.

== Roster ==
1995–96 Maryland Terrapins men's basketball team
Players
Coaches

Pos.	#	Name	Height	Weight	Year	Hometown
G/F	3	Laron Profit	6 ft 5 in (1.96 m)	189 lb (86 kg)	Fr	Charleston, South Carolina
F	4	Exree Hipp	6 ft 8 in (2.03 m)	224 lb (102 kg)	Sr	Washington, D.C.
G	5	Matt Raydo	5 ft 10 in (1.78 m)	153 lb (69 kg)	Jr	Fort Lauderdale, Florida
G	10	Duane Simpkins	6 ft 0 in (1.83 m)	172 lb (78 kg)	Sr	Fort Washington, Maryland
G	11	Matt Kovarik	6 ft 4 in (1.93 m)	201 lb (91 kg)	Jr	Greensboro, North Carolina
G	12	Terrell Stokes	6 ft 0 in (1.83 m)	172 lb (78 kg)	Fr	Philadelphia, Pennsylvania
G	13	Šarūnas Jasikevičius	6 ft 4 in (1.93 m)	195 lb (88 kg)	So	Kaunas, Lithuania
G	15	Johnny Rhodes	6 ft 4 in (1.93 m)	212 lb (96 kg)	Sr	Washington, D.C.
F	21	Mario Lucas	6 ft 8 in (2.03 m)	241 lb (109 kg)	Sr	Memphis, Tennessee
F	22	Keith Booth	6 ft 6 in (1.98 m)	222 lb (101 kg)	Jr	Baltimore, Maryland
F	25	Rodney Elliott	6 ft 8 in (2.03 m)	213 lb (97 kg)	So	Baltimore, Maryland
G	31	Norman Fields	6 ft 0 in (1.83 m)	185 lb (84 kg)	Fr	Mt. Vernon, New York
F/C	45	Brian Watkins	6 ft 9 in (2.06 m)	216 lb (98 kg)	So	Nashville, Tennessee
F/C	54	Obinna Ekezie	6 ft 9 in (2.06 m)	260 lb (118 kg)	Fr	Port Harcourt, Nigeria

Head coach

- Gary Williams (Maryland)

Assistant coach(es)

- Billy Hahn (Maryland)
- Dave Dickerson (Maryland)
- Jimmy Patsos (Catholic)

Legend

- (C) Team captain
- (S) Suspended
- (I) Ineligible
- (W) Walk-on
- Injured
- Current redshirt

Roster

== Schedule and results ==
Date time, TV	Rank^{#}	Opponent^{#}	Result	Record	Site (attendance) city, state
Regular season
Nov 24, 1995*; ESPN	No. 14	vs. No. 1 Kentucky; Tip-off Classic	L 84–96	0–1	Springfield Civic Center; Springfield, Massachusetts
Nov 27, 1995*	No. 16	Towson	W 70–67	1–1	Cole Field House; College Park, Maryland
Dec 2, 1995*	No. 16	vs. No. 5 UMass; Franklin National Bank Classic	L 47–50	1–2	USAir Arena (16,302); Landover, Maryland
Dec 3, 1995*	No. 16	vs. George Washington; Franklin National Bank Classic	W 98–81	2–2	USAir Arena; Landover, Maryland
Dec 6, 1995*	No. 19	Howard	W 88–71	3–2	Cole Field House; College Park, Maryland
Dec 9, 1995*	No. 19	vs. UCLA; Wooden Classic	L 63–73	3–3	Arrowhead Pond of Anaheim (17,330); Anaheim, California
Dec 13, 1995*	No. 24	Rider	W 83–67	4–3	Cole Field House; College Park, Maryland
Dec 23, 1995*	No. 25	American	W 104–79	5–3	Cole Field House; College Park, Maryland
Dec 28, 1995*	No. 24	Maryland Eastern Shore	W 104–66	6–3	Cole Field House; College Park, Maryland
Jan 3, 1996		at Georgia Tech	L 84–98	6–4 (0–1)	Alexander Memorial Coliseum; Atlanta, Georgia
Jan 6, 1996		No. 16 North Carolina	L 86–88 ^{OT}	6–5 (0–2)	Cole Field House; College Park, Maryland
Jan 13, 1996		at No. 8 Wake Forest	L 64–77	6–6 (0–3)	Lawrence Joel Memorial Coliseum; Winston-Salem, North Carolina
Jan 17, 1996*		Delaware State	W 118–55	7–6	Cole Field House; College Park, Maryland
Jan 20, 1996*		NC State	W 77–74 ^{OT}	8–6 (1–3)	Cole Field House; College Park, Maryland
Jan 24, 1996		No. 18 Clemson	W 65–60	9–6 (2–3)	Cole Field House; College Park, Maryland
Jan 28, 1996		at Duke	L 73–83	9–7 (2–4)	Cameron Indoor Stadium; Durham, North Carolina
Feb 1, 1996		at Virginia	W 80–72	10–7 (3–4)	University Hall; Charlottesville, Virginia
Feb 3, 1996		No. 25 Georgia Tech	W 88–74	11–7 (4–4)	Cole Field House; College Park, Maryland
Feb 6, 1996		at No. 12 North Carolina	W 84–78	12–7 (5–4)	Dean Smith Center; Chapel Hill, North Carolina
Feb 10, 1996		at Florida State	L 78–100	12–8 (5–5)	Tallahassee-Leon County Civic Center; Tallahassee, Florida
Feb 15, 1996		No. 8 Wake Forest	L 78–85	12–9 (5–6)	Cole Field House; College Park, Maryland
Feb 18, 1996*		Missouri	W 91–72	13–9	Cole Field House; College Park, Maryland
Feb 22, 1996		at NC State	W 86–84	14–9 (6–6)	Reynolds Coliseum; Raleigh, North Carolina
Feb 24, 1996		at Clemson	L 61–68	14–10 (6–7)	Littlejohn Coliseum; Clemson, South Carolina
Feb 28, 1996		Duke	L 75–77	14–11 (6–8)	Cole Field House; College Park, Maryland
Mar 2, 1996		Virginia	W 83–71	15–11 (7–8)	Cole Field House; College Park, Maryland
Mar 4, 1996		Florida State	W 88–78	16–11 (8–8)	Cole Field House; College Park, Maryland
ACC tournament
Mar 8, 1996*		vs. Duke; Quarterfinals	W 82–69	17–11	Greensboro Coliseum; Greensboro, North Carolina
Mar 9, 1996*		vs. No. 18 Georgia Tech; Semifinals	L 79–84	17–12	Greensboro Coliseum; Greensboro, North Carolina
1996 NCAA Men's Basketball tournament
Mar 15, 1996*	(7 W)	vs. (10 W) Santa Clara; First Round	L 79–91	17–13	ASU Activity Center; Tempe, Arizona
*Non-conference game. ^{#}Rankings from AP Poll. (#) Tournament seedings in parentheses. W=West. All times are in Eastern Time.
