= 1995–96 Portland Pilots men's basketball team =

American college basketball season

1995–96 Portland Pilots men's basketball
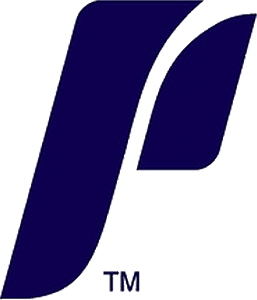

WCC tournament champions

NCAA tournament, first round
- Conference: West Coast Conference
- Record: 19–11 (7–7 WCC)
- Head coach: Rob Chavez (2nd season)
- Home arena: Chiles Center

1995–96 West Coast Conference men's basketball standings
	Conf.				Overall
Team	W		L	PCT	W		L	PCT
Santa Clara	10	–	4	.714	20	–	9	.690
Gonzaga	10	–	4	.714	21	–	9	.700
Loyola Marymount	8	–	6	.571	18	–	11	.621
San Francisco	8	–	6	.571	15	–	12	.556
Portland †	7	–	7	.500	19	–	11	.633
San Diego	6	–	8	.429	14	–	14	.500
Saint Mary's	5	–	9	.357	12	–	15	.444
Pepperdine	2	–	12	.143	10	–	18	.357
† Conference tournament winner Rankings from AP poll

The 1995–96 Portland Pilots men's basketball team represented the University of Portland during the 1995–96 NCAA Division I men's basketball season. The Pilots, led by tenth-year head coach Eric Reveno, played their home games at the Chiles Center and were members of the West Coast Conference. They finished the season 19–11, 7–7 in WCC play to finish in fifth place. They won the WCC tournamentby defeating Gonzaga in the championship game to receive the conference's automatic bid to the NCAA tournament – the program's first appearance since 1959. Playing as No. 14 seed in the Midwest region, the Pilots were beaten by No. 3 seed Villanova, 92–58, in the opening round. To date, this is the most recent appearance in the NCAA tournament for the Portland men's basketball team.

== Roster ==
1995–96 Portland Pilots men's basketball team
Players	Coaches
Pos. / # / Name / Height / Weight / Year / Previous school / Hometown; G / / Kweemada King / 6 ft 4 in (1.93 m) / — / Jr	Head coach: Rob Chavez; Assistant coach(es) Legend: (C) Team captain; (S) Suspended; (I) Ineligible; (W) Walk-on; Injured; Current redshirt; Roster

== Schedule and results ==
Date time, TV	Rank^{#}	Opponent^{#}	Result	Record	Site (attendance) city, state
Non-conference regular season
Nov 25, 1995*		UAB	W 69–60	1–0	Chiles Center; Portland, Oregon
Nov 30, 1995*		Oregon State	W 61–50	2–0	Chiles Center; Portland, Oregon
Dec 22, 1995*		at Washington	L 59–71	6–2	Hec Edmundson Pavilion; Seattle, Washington
Jan 6, 1996*		at Butler	L 80–87	9–3	Hinkle Fieldhouse; Indianapolis, Indiana
WCC regular season
Jan 12, 1996		at Saint Mary's	W 97–86	10–3 (1–0)	McKeon Pavilion; Moraga, California
Feb 24, 1996		Saint Mary's	L 83–91	16–10 (7–7)	Chiles Center; Portland, Oregon
WCC tournament
Mar 2, 1996*	(5)	vs. (4) San Francisco; Quarterfinals	W 78–72	17–10	Toso Pavilion; Santa Clara, California
Mar 3, 1996*	(5)	vs. (6) San Diego; Semifinals	W 65–52	18–10	Toso Pavilion; Santa Clara, California
Mar 4, 1996*	(5)	vs. (2) Gonzaga; Championship game	W 76–68	19–10	Toso Pavilion; Santa Clara, California
NCAA tournament
Mar 15, 1996*	(14 MW)	vs. (3 MW) No. 10 Villanova; First round	L 58–92	19–11	Bradley Center; Milwaukee, Wisconsin
*Non-conference game. ^{#}Rankings from AP Poll. (#) Tournament seedings in parentheses. All times are in Pacific Time.
