= 1995–96 Duke Blue Devils men's basketball team =

American college basketball season

1995–96 Duke Blue Devils men's basketball

NCAA tournament, round of 64
- Conference: Atlantic Coast Conference
- Record: 18–13 (8–8 ACC)
- Head coach: Mike Krzyzewski (16th season)
- Home arena: Cameron Indoor Stadium

1995–96 ACC men's basketball standings
	Conf.				Overall
Team	W		L	PCT	W		L	PCT
No. 13 Georgia Tech	13	–	3	.813	24	–	12	.667
No. 9 Wake Forest †	12	–	4	.750	26	–	6	.813
No. 25 North Carolina	10	–	6	.625	21	–	11	.656
Duke	8	–	8	.500	18	–	13	.581
Maryland	8	–	8	.500	17	–	13	.567
Clemson	7	–	9	.438	18	–	11	.621
Virginia	6	–	10	.375	12	–	15	.444
Florida State	5	–	11	.313	13	–	14	.481
NC State	3	–	13	.188	15	–	16	.484
† 1996 ACC tournament winner Rankings from AP poll

The 1995–96 Duke Blue Devils men's basketball team represented Duke University in the 1995-96 NCAA Division I men's basketball season. The head coach was Mike Krzyzewski, and the team finished the season with an overall record of 18–13. Duke was invited to the 1996 NCAA Tournament as a #8 seed. In the first round, the Blue Devils lost to Eastern Michigan 75–60.

== Roster ==
1995–96 Duke Blue Devils men's basketball team
Players
Coaches

Pos.	#	Name	Height	Weight	Year	Previous school	Hometown
F	3	Ricky Price	6 ft 5 in (1.96 m)	185 lb (84 kg)	So	Serra HS	Carson, CA
F	4	Roshown McLeod (I) (redshirt)	6 ft 8 in (2.03 m)	220 lb (100 kg)	Jr	St. Anthony HS; St. John's	Jersey City, NJ
G	5	Jeff Capel (C)	6 ft 4 in (1.93 m)	195 lb (88 kg)	Jr	South View HS	Fayetteville, NC
G	12	Steve Wojciechowski	5 ft 11 in (1.8 m)	180 lb (82 kg)	So	Cardinal Gibbons School	Severna Park, MD
C	13	Taymon Domzalski	6 ft 10 in (2.08 m)	245 lb (111 kg)	Fr	New Mexico Military Institute	Lovington, NM
G	14	Jeremy Hall (W)	6 ft 4 in (1.93 m)	175 lb (79 kg)	Fr	Cardinal Mooney HS	Sarasota, FL
F	15	Todd Singleton (W)	6 ft 4 in (1.93 m)	180 lb (82 kg)	So	Old Mill HS	Queenstown, MD
G	20	Chris Collins (C)	6 ft 3 in (1.91 m)	180 lb (82 kg)	Sr	Glenbrook North HS	Northbrook, IL
G	21	Trajan Langdon (injured) (W) (redshirt)	6 ft 3 in (1.91 m)	195 lb (88 kg)	So	East HS	Anchorage, AK
G	22	Jay Heaps (W)	5 ft 9 in (1.75 m)	150 lb (68 kg)	Fr	Longmeadow HS	Longmeadow, MA
F	30	Tony Moore (I)	6 ft 7 in (2.01 m)	240 lb (109 kg)	Sr	Newport Prep (MD)	Washington, D.C.
F	31	Stan Brunson	6 ft 7 in (2.01 m)	215 lb (98 kg)	RS Sr	Christiana HS	Newark, DE
F	34	Carmen Wallace	6 ft 5 in (1.96 m)	190 lb (86 kg)	Jr	Tower Hill School	Wilmington, DE
F	41	Matt Christensen	6 ft 10 in (2.08 m)	230 lb (104 kg)	Fr	Belmont HS	Belmont, MA
F	52	Baker Perry (W)	6 ft 5 in (1.96 m)	195 lb (88 kg)	Sr	Tuscola HS	Waynesville, NC
C	55	Greg Newton	6 ft 10 in (2.08 m)	220 lb (100 kg)	Jr	A. N. Myer Secondary	Niagara Falls, Ontario

Head coach

- Mike Krzyzewski (Army)

Assistant coach(es)

- Tommy Amaker (Duke)
- Quin Snyder (Duke)
- Tim O'Toole (Fairfield)

Strength and conditioning coach(es)

- Sonny Falcone (Duke)

Athletic trainer(s)

- David Engelhardt (Mankato State)

Legend

- (C) Team captain
- (S) Suspended
- (I) Ineligible
- (W) Walk-on
- Injured
- Current redshirt

Roster
Last update: 2024-07-15

== Team roster ==
The 1995–96 Duke Blue Devils men's basketball team poster titled "Networking" features players assembled in Cameron Indoor Stadium dressed in business attire and surrounded by various productivity devices such as laptops, personal computers, telephones, and cellular phones.

== Schedule ==
Date time, TV	Rank^{#}	Opponent^{#}	Result	Record	Site city, state
November 23*; 8:30 p.m.		vs. Old Dominion; Great Alaska Shootout	W 75–55	1–0	Sullivan Arena (7,863); Anchorage, AK
November 24*; 8:00 p.m.		vs. No. 23 Indiana; Great Alaska Shootout	W 70–64	2–0	Sullivan Arena (7,863); Anchorage, AK
November 25*; 8:00 p.m.		vs. No. 10 Iowa; Great Alaska Shootout	W 88–81	3–0	Sullivan Arena (7,863); Anchorage, AK
November 29*; 7:00 p.m.	No. 12	UNC-Greensboro	W 71–57	4–0	Cameron Indoor Stadium (9,314); Durham, NC
December 2*; 7:00 p.m.	No. 12	Illinois	L 65–75	4–1	Cameron Indoor Stadium (9,314); Durham, NC
December 4*; 7:30 p.m.	No. 18	South Carolina State	W 84–64	5–1	Cameron Indoor Stadium (9,314); Durham, NC
December 9*; 3:00 p.m.	No. 18	No. 2 Michigan; Rivalry	L 84–88	5–2	Crisler Arena (13,562); Ann Arbor, MI
December 19*; 7:30 p.m.	No. 21	Delaware	W 79–73	6–2	Cameron Indoor Stadium (9,314); Durham, NC
December 20*; 7:30 p.m.	No. 21	Western Carolina	W 107–67	7–2	Cameron Indoor Stadium (9,314); Durham, NC
December 28*; 7:30 p.m.	No. 20	Monmouth	W 69–53	8–2	Cameron Indoor Stadium (9,314); Durham, NC
December 30*; 1:00 p.m.	No. 20	at Northeastern	W 87–56	9–2	Matthews Arena (5,820); Boston, MA
January 3; 7:30 p.m.	No. 19	at No. 22 Clemson	L 48–51	9–3 (0–1)	Littlejohn Coliseum (11,020); Clemson, SC
January 7; 1:00 p.m.	No. 19	Georgia Tech	L 81–86	9–4 (0–2)	Cameron Indoor Stadium (9,314); Durham, NC
January 10; 7:00 p.m.		No. 8 Wake Forest	L 54–57	9–5 (0–3)	Cameron Indoor Stadium (9,314); Durham, NC
January 13; 2:00 p.m.		at Virginia	L 66–77	9–6 (0–4)	University Hall (7,242); Charlottesville, VA
January 18; 8:00 p.m.		at NC State	W 71–70	10–6 (1–4)	Reynolds Coliseum (12,400); Raleigh, NC
January 20; 9:00 p.m.		Florida State	W 85–65	11–6 (2–4)	Cameron Indoor Stadium (9,314); Durham, NC
January 25*; 9:30 p.m.		at Temple	L 58–59	11–7	The Spectrum (12,365); Philadelphia, PA
January 28; 1:00 p.m.		Maryland; Rivalry	W 83–73	12–7 (3–4)	Cameron Indoor Stadium (9,314); Durham, NC
January 31; 9:00 p.m.		at No. 8 North Carolina; Rivalry	L 72–73	12–8 (3–5)	Dean Smith Center (21,572); Chapel Hill, NC
February 3; 12:00 p.m.		No. 24 Clemson	W 83–53	13–8 (4–5)	Cameron Indoor Stadium (9,314); Durham, NC
February 7; 7:00 p.m.		at Georgia Tech	L 71–73 ^{OT}	13–9 (4–6)	Alexander Memorial Coliseum (9,756); Atlanta, GA
February 11; 1:30 p.m.		at No. 9 Wake Forest	L 65–79	13–10 (4–7)	LJVM Coliseum (14,407); Winston-Salem, NC
February 14; 9:00 p.m.		Virginia	W 79–69	14–10 (5–7)	Cameron Indoor Stadium (9,314); Durham, NC
February 17; 12:00 p.m.		NC State	W 79–76 ^{OT}	15–10 (6–7)	Cameron Indoor Stadium (9,314); Durham, NC
February 22; 8:00 p.m.		at Florida State	W 93–87	16–10 (7–7)	Leon County Civic Center (7,980); Tallahassee, FL
February 25*; 3:45 p.m.		UCLA	W 85–66	17–10	Cameron Indoor Stadium (9,314); Durham, NC
February 28; 9:00 p.m.		at Maryland	W 77–75	18–10 (8–7)	Cole Field House (14,500); College Park, MD
March 3; 3:45 p.m.		No. 19 North Carolina	L 78–84	18–11 (8–8)	Cameron Indoor Stadium (9,314); Durham, NC
ACC Tournament
March 8*; 12:00 p.m.		vs. Maryland; ACC tournament	L 69–82	18–12	Greensboro Coliseum (23,556); Greensboro, NC
NCAA Tournament
March 14*; 2:45 p.m., CBS		vs. Eastern Michigan; NCAA tournament	L 60–75	18–13	RCA Dome (31,373); Indianapolis, IN
*Non-conference game. ^{#}Rankings from AP Poll. (#) Tournament seedings in parentheses. All times are in Eastern.
