= Clemson Tigers men's basketball, 1990–1999 =

American collegiate basketball team seasons

The Clemson Tigers men's basketball teams of 1990–1999 represented Clemson University in NCAA college basketball competition.

== 1989–90 ==
1989–90 Clemson Tigers men's basketball

ACC regular season champions

NCAA tournament, Sweet Sixteen
- Conference: Atlantic Coast Conference

Ranking
- Coaches: No. 17
- AP: No. 17
- Record: 24–8 (10–4 ACC)
- Head coach: Cliff Ellis
- Home arena: Littlejohn Coliseum

1989–90 ACC men's basketball standings
	Conf.				Overall
Team	W		L	PCT	W		L	PCT
No. 17 Clemson	10	–	4	.714	26	–	9	.743
No. 15 Duke	9	–	5	.643	29	–	9	.763
No. 9 Georgia Tech†	8	–	6	.571	28	–	7	.800
North Carolina	8	–	6	.571	21	–	13	.618
Virginia	6	–	8	.429	20	–	12	.625
NC State	6	–	8	.429	18	–	12	.600
Maryland	6	–	8	.429	19	–	14	.576
Wake Forest	3	–	11	.214	12	–	16	.429
† 1990 ACC tournament winner Rankings from AP Poll

Clemson's participation in the 1990 NCAA Tournament was vacated by the Committee on Infractions.

Date	Opponent	Rank^{#}	Site	Result
November 24*	vs. American–Puerto Rico		Mario Morales Coliseum • Guaynabo, PR (San Juan Shootout Quarterfinal)	W 87–73
November 25*	vs. Stetson		Mario Morales Coliseum • Guaynabo, PR (San Juan Shootout Semifinal)	W 74–61
November 26*	vs. Alabama		Mario Morales Coliseum • Guaynabo, PR (San Juan Shootout Final)	L 48–57
November 28*	at The Citadel		McAlister Field House • Charleston, SC	W 71–54
December 6*	vs. Providence		Greensboro Coliseum • Greensboro, NC (ACC–Big East Challenge)	W 72–71
December 9*	Radford		Littlejohn Coliseum • Clemson, SC	W 114–76
December 18*	at UNC–Charlotte		Charlotte Coliseum • Charlotte, NC	W 104–79
December 27*	vs. Villanova		San Diego, CA (Texaco Star Classic Semifinal)	L 71–73
December 28*	vs. Niagara		San Diego, CA (Texaco Star Classic Consolation)	W 85–65
January 2	at #18 NC State		Reynolds Coliseum • Raleigh, NC	L 77–79
January 6	Maryland		Littlejohn Coliseum • Clemson, SC	W 82–77
January 9	at Virginia		University Hall • Charlottesville, VA	W 76–70
January 11*	UNC–Asheville		Littlejohn Coliseum • Clemson, SC	W 78–54
January 13	Wake Forest		Littlejohn Coliseum • Clemson, SC	W 76–57
January 15*	Georgia State		Littlejohn Coliseum • Clemson, SC	W 117–59
January 17*	Western Carolina		Littlejohn Coliseum • Clemson, SC	W 97–61
January 20*	Hofstra		Littlejohn Coliseum • Clemson, SC	W 91–58
January 25	#13 Georgia Tech		Littlejohn Coliseum • Clemson, SC	W 91–90
January 27	at North Carolina		Dean Smith Center • Chapel Hill, NC	L 60–83
January 31	at #5 Duke		Cameron Indoor Stadium • Durham, NC	L 80–94
February 3*	South Carolina		Littlejohn Coliseum • Clemson, SC	W 83–65
February 7	at Maryland		Cole Field House • College Park, MD	W 75–73
February 10	Virginia		Littlejohn Coliseum • Clemson, SC	W 74–63
February 12	NC State		Littlejohn Coliseum • Clemson, SC	W 89–81
February 14*	Furman		Littlejohn Coliseum • Clemson, SC	W 85–74
February 21	at Wake Forest		LJVM Coliseum • Winston-Salem, NC	W 89–75
February 24	North Carolina	#23	Littlejohn Coliseum • Clemson, SC	W 69–61
February 28	#5 Duke	#20	Littlejohn Coliseum • Clemson, SC	W 97–93
March 3	at #11 Georgia Tech	#20	Alexander Memorial Coliseum • Atlanta, GA	L 69–85
March 5*	at South Carolina	#17	Carolina Coliseum • Columbia, SC	L 53–54
March 9*	vs. Wake Forest	#17	Charlotte Coliseum • Charlotte, NC (ACC Tournament Quarterfinal)	W 79–70
March 10*	vs. Virginia	#17	Charlotte Coliseum • Charlotte, NC (ACC Tournament Semifinal)	L 66–69
March 15*	vs. Brigham Young	#17	Hartford Civic Center • Hartford, CT (NCAA first round)	W 49–47
March 17*	vs. #12 La Salle	#17	Hartford Civic Center • Hartford, CT (NCAA second round)	W 79–75
March 22*	vs. #3 Connecticut	#17	Brendan Byrne Arena • East Rutherford, NJ (NCAA Sweet Sixteen)	L 70–71
*Non-Conference Game. #Rankings from AP Poll released prior to game.

== 1990–91 ==
1990–91 Clemson Tigers men's basketball

Florida International Tournament champions
- Conference: Atlantic Coast Conference
- Record: 11–17 (2–12 ACC)
- Head coach: Cliff Ellis
- Home arena: Littlejohn Coliseum

1990–91 ACC men's basketball standings
	Conf.				Overall
Team	W		L	PCT	W		L	PCT
No. 6 Duke	11	–	3	.786	32	–	7	.821
No. 4 North Carolina †	10	–	4	.714	29	–	6	.829
Wake Forest	8	–	6	.571	19	–	11	.633
NC State	8	–	6	.571	20	–	11	.645
Georgia Tech	6	–	8	.429	17	–	13	.567
Virginia	6	–	8	.429	21	–	12	.636
Maryland	5	–	9	.357	16	–	12	.571
Clemson	2	–	12	.143	11	–	17	.393
† 1991 ACC tournament winner Rankings from AP poll

Date	Opponent	Site	Result
November 24*	Maryland–Baltimore County	Littlejohn Coliseum • Clemson, SC	W 90–73
November 26*	Samford	Littlejohn Coliseum • Clemson, SC	W 96–56
November 28*	The Citadel	Littlejohn Coliseum • Clemson, SC	W 91–77
December 2*	Furman	Littlejohn Coliseum • Clemson, SC	W 68–66
December 4*	vs. Seton Hall	Carrier Dome • Syracuse, NY (ACC–Big East Challenge)	L 62–78
December 8*	Wisconsin–Green Bay	Littlejohn Coliseum • Clemson, SC	W 75–68
December 15*	UNC–Charlotte	Littlejohn Coliseum • Clemson, SC	L 100–108
December 17*	South Carolina State	Littlejohn Coliseum • Clemson, SC	W 103–83
December 20*	vs. Coppin State	Golden Panther Arena • Miami, FL (Florida International Tournament Semifinal)	W 71–70
December 21*	vs. Florida Atlantic	Golden Panther Arena • Miami, FL (Florida International Tournament Final)	W 99–89
January 2	at NC State	Reynolds Coliseum • Raleigh, NC	L 70–74
January 5	at Maryland	Cole Field House • College Park, MD	L 65–81
January 8	#13 Virginia	Littlejohn Coliseum • Clemson, SC	L 78–82
January 12	Wake Forest	Littlejohn Coliseum • Clemson, SC	L 88–93 (OT)
January 16*	Western Carolina	Littlejohn Coliseum • Clemson, SC	W 103–82
January 19*	Temple	Littlejohn Coliseum • Clemson, SC	L 52–71
January 24	at #25 Georgia Tech	Alexander Memorial Coliseum • Atlanta, GA	L 68–89
January 26	#7 Duke	Littlejohn Coliseum • Clemson, SC	L 70–99
January 31	#9 North Carolina	Littlejohn Coliseum • Clemson, SC	L 77–90
February 2*	at South Carolina	Carolina Coliseum • Columbia, SC	L 53–58
February 6	Maryland	Littlejohn Coliseum • Clemson, SC	W 73–69
February 10	NC State	Littlejohn Coliseum • Clemson, SC	L 62–72
February 16	at Virginia	University Hall • Charlottesville, VA	L 47–57
February 23	at #6 North Carolina	Dean Smith Center • Chapel Hill, NC	L 57–73
February 24	at Wake Forest	LJVM Coliseum • Winston-Salem, NC	L 55–81
February 27	at #8 Duke	Cameron Indoor Stadium • Durham, NC	L 62–79
March 2	#24 Georgia Tech	Littlejohn Coliseum • Clemson, SC	W 69–62
March 8*	vs. #7 North Carolina	Charlotte Coliseum • Charlotte, NC (ACC Tournament Quarterfinal)	L 59–67
*Non-Conference Game. #Rankings from AP Poll released prior to game.

== 1991–92 ==
1991–92 Clemson Tigers men's basketball
- Conference: Atlantic Coast Conference
- Record: 14–14 (4–12 ACC)
- Head coach: Cliff Ellis
- Home arena: Littlejohn Coliseum

1991–92 ACC men's basketball standings
	Conf.				Overall
Team	W		L	PCT	W		L	PCT
No. 1 Duke †	14	–	2	.875	34	–	2	.944
No. 20 Florida State	11	–	5	.688	22	–	10	.688
No. 18 North Carolina	9	–	7	.563	23	–	10	.697
Georgia Tech	8	–	8	.500	23	–	12	.657
Virginia	8	–	8	.500	20	–	13	.606
Wake Forest	7	–	9	.438	17	–	12	.586
NC State	6	–	10	.375	12	–	18	.400
Maryland	5	–	11	.313	14	–	15	.483
Clemson	4	–	12	.250	14	–	14	.500
† 1992 ACC tournament winner Rankings from AP Poll

Date	Opponent	Site	Result
November 30*	Morehead State	Littlejohn Coliseum • Clemson, SC	W 114–69
December 2*	Oral Roberts	Littlejohn Coliseum • Clemson, SC	W 96–76
December 7*	Charleston Southern	Littlejohn Coliseum • Clemson, SC	W 87–67
December 14*	Tennessee State	Littlejohn Coliseum • Clemson, SC	W 85–60
December 16*	Furman	Littlejohn Coliseum • Clemson, SC	W 87–83
December 28*	vs. Texas	Special Events Center • El Paso, TX (Sun Bowl Carnival Semifinal)	L 87–95
December 29*	vs. Northern Iowa	Special Events Center • El Paso, TX (Sun Bowl Carnival Consolation)	W 63–60
January 4	#20 Wake Forest	Littlejohn Coliseum • Clemson, SC	L 58–73 (OT)
January 9	at #8 North Carolina	Dean Smith Center • Chapel Hill, NC	L 69–103
January 11*	UNC–Asheville	Littlejohn Coliseum • Clemson, SC	W 94–54
January 13*	Wofford	Littlejohn Coliseum • Clemson, SC	W 79–59
January 18	NC State	Littlejohn Coliseum • Clemson, SC	L 75–78
January 22	Virginia	Littlejohn Coliseum • Clemson, SC	W 51–48
January 25	at Maryland	Cole Field House • College Park, MD	L 71–84
January 27	at #1 Duke	Cameron Indoor Stadium • Durham, NC	L 73–112
January 29*	at Western Carolina	Ramsey Center • Cullowhee, NC	W 81–71
February 1*	South Carolina	Littlejohn Coliseum • Clemson, SC	W 55–52
February 5	#24 Georgia Tech	Littlejohn Coliseum • Clemson, SC	W 95–78 (OT)
February 8	at #23 Florida State	Tallahassee-Leon County Civic Center • Tallahassee, FL	L 90–102
February 12	at Wake Forest	LJVM Coliseum • Winston-Salem, NC	L 48–60
February 15	#4 North Carolina	Littlejohn Coliseum • Clemson, SC	L 72–80
February 18	#16 Florida State	Littlejohn Coliseum • Clemson, SC	W 68–67
February 22	Maryland	Littlejohn Coliseum • Clemson, SC	W 82–70
February 26	at NC State	Reynolds Coliseum • Raleigh, NC	L 61–63
February 29	at Virginia	University Hall • Charlottesville, VA	L 49–69
March 4	#1 Duke	Littlejohn Coliseum • Clemson, SC	L 97–98
March 8	at Georgia Tech	Alexander Memorial Coliseum • Atlanta, GA	L 82–101
March 12*	vs. Maryland	Charlotte Coliseum • Charlotte, NC (ACC Tournament First round)	L 75–81
*Non-Conference Game. #Rankings from AP Poll released prior to game.

== 1992–93 ==
1992–93 Clemson Tigers men's basketball

NIT, second round
- Conference: Atlantic Coast Conference
- Record: 17–13 (5–11 ACC)
- Head coach: Cliff Ellis
- Home arena: Littlejohn Coliseum

1992–93 ACC men's basketball standings
	Conf.				Overall
Team	W		L	PCT	W		L	PCT
No. 4 North Carolina	14	–	2	.875	34	–	4	.895
No. 11 Florida State	12	–	4	.750	25	–	10	.714
No. 10 Duke	10	–	6	.625	24	–	8	.750
No. 16 Wake Forest	10	–	6	.625	21	–	9	.700
Virginia	9	–	7	.563	21	–	10	.677
No. 18 Georgia Tech †	8	–	8	.500	19	–	11	.633
Clemson	5	–	11	.313	17	–	13	.567
Maryland	2	–	14	.125	12	–	16	.429
NC State	2	–	14	.125	8	–	19	.296
† 1993 ACC tournament winner Rankings from AP poll

Date	Opponent	Site	Result
December 2*	Liberty	Littlejohn Coliseum • Clemson, SC	W 93–68
December 5*	Howard	Littlejohn Coliseum • Clemson, SC	W 89–70
December 12*	UNC–Greensboro	Littlejohn Coliseum • Clemson, SC	W 88–62
December 17*	at Furman	Alley Gymnasium • Greenville, SC	W 82–59
December 19*	The Citadel	Littlejohn Coliseum • Clemson, SC	W 76–54
December 21*	Davidson	Littlejohn Coliseum • Clemson, SC	W 93–77
December 28*	vs. Appalachian State	Charlotte Coliseum • Charlotte, NC	W 91–73
December 30*	Mercer	Littlejohn Coliseum • Clemson, SC	W 87–69
January 3*	Furman	Littlejohn Coliseum • Clemson, SC	W 80–72
January 6	at #1 Duke	Cameron Indoor Stadium • Durham, NC	L 67–110
January 13	at #14 Virginia	University Hall • Charlottesville, VA	L 82–100
January 16	#5 North Carolina	Littlejohn Coliseum • Clemson, SC	L 72–82
January 20	Florida State	Littlejohn Coliseum • Clemson, SC	L 71–89
January 24	at Wake Forest	LJVM Coliseum • Winston-Salem, NC	L 56–74
January 26	Maryland	Littlejohn Coliseum • Clemson, SC	W 82–72
January 31	at NC State	Reynolds Coliseum • Raleigh, NC	L 70–72
February 4	at #22 Georgia Tech	Alexander Memorial Coliseum • Atlanta, GA	W 83–80
February 6*	at South Carolina	Carolina Coliseum • Columbia, SC	W 89–84 (OT)
February 8	#3 Duke	Littlejohn Coliseum • Clemson, SC	L 84–93
February 13	#24 Virginia	Littlejohn Coliseum • Clemson, SC	L 78–83
February 17	at #3 North Carolina	Dean Smith Center • Chapel Hill, NC	L 67–80
February 20	at #9 Florida State	Tallahassee-Leon County Civic Center • Tallahassee, FL	L 92–102
February 24	#12 Wake Forest	Littlejohn Coliseum • Clemson, SC	W 76–74
February 27	at Maryland	Cole Field House • College Park, MD	W 81–73
March 3	NC State	Littlejohn Coliseum • Clemson, SC	W 92–82
March 7	Georgia Tech	Littlejohn Coliseum • Clemson, SC	L 59–66
March 12*	vs. #10 Florida State	Charlotte Coliseum • Charlotte, NC (ACC Tournament Quarterfinal)	W 87–75
March 13*	vs. Georgia Tech	Charlotte Coliseum • Charlotte, NC (ACC Tournament Semifinal)	L 61–69
March 18*	Auburn	Littlejohn Coliseum • Clemson, SC (NIT First round)	W 84–72
March 22*	at Alabama–Birmingham	Bartow Arena • Birmingham, AL (NIT Second round)	L 64–65
*Non-Conference Game. #Rankings from AP Poll released prior to game.

== 1993–94 ==
1993–94 Clemson Tigers men's basketball

NIT, Quarterfinals
- Conference: Atlantic Coast Conference
- Record: 18–16 (6–10 ACC)
- Head coach: Cliff Ellis
- Home arena: Littlejohn Coliseum

1993–94 ACC men's basketball standings
	Conf.				Overall
Team	W		L	PCT	W		L	PCT
No. 6 Duke	12	–	4	.750	28	–	6	.824
No. 1 North Carolina †	11	–	5	.688	28	–	7	.800
Wake Forest	9	–	7	.563	21	–	12	.636
Virginia	8	–	8	.500	18	–	13	.581
Maryland	8	–	8	.500	18	–	12	.600
Georgia Tech	7	–	9	.438	16	–	13	.552
Florida State	6	–	10	.375	13	–	14	.481
Clemson	6	–	10	.375	18	–	16	.529
NC State	5	–	11	.313	11	–	19	.367
† 1994 ACC tournament winner Rankings from AP poll

Date	Opponent	Site	Result
November 29*	Texas–Arlington	Littlejohn Coliseum • Clemson, SC	W 86–55
December 1*	at Charleston Southern	CSU Field House • North Charleston, SC	W 120–103
December 4*	Furman	Littlejohn Coliseum • Clemson, SC	W 85–70
December 15*	at #15 Minnesota	Williams Arena • Minneapolis, MN	L 54–73
December 18*	The Citadel	Littlejohn Coliseum • Clemson, SC	W 76–64
December 19*	at Davidson	Charlotte Coliseum • Charlotte, NC	L 79–82
December 27*	vs. Evansville	Neal S. Blaisdell Center • Honolulu, HI (Rainbow Classic Quarterfinal)	L 80–81
December 29*	vs. Army	Neal S. Blaisdell Center • Honolulu, HI (Rainbow Classic Consolation)	W 72–48
December 30*	vs. #20 Oklahoma State	Neal S. Blaisdell Center • Honolulu, HI (Rainbow Classic Consolation)	W 68–65
January 5	#3 Duke	Littlejohn Coliseum • Clemson, SC	L 65–71
January 8*	UNC–Charlotte	Littlejohn Coliseum • Clemson, SC	W 67–63
January 10*	at Mercer	Porter Gym • Macon, GA	W 88–71
January 12	Virginia	Littlejohn Coliseum • Clemson, SC	L 57–64
January 15	at #1 North Carolina	Dean Smith Center • Chapel Hill, NC	L 62–106
January 19	at Florida State	Tallahassee-Leon County Civic Center • Tallahassee, FL	L 57–60
January 22	Wake Forest	Littlejohn Coliseum • Clemson, SC	W 75–68
January 24*	Appalachian State	Littlejohn Coliseum • Clemson, SC	W 66–56
January 26	at #18 Maryland	Cole Field House • College Park, MD	L 53–73
January 29	NC State	Littlejohn Coliseum • Clemson, SC	W 95–73
February 2	Georgia Tech	Littlejohn Coliseum • Clemson, SC	W 88–69
February 5	at #1 Duke	Cameron Indoor Stadium • Durham, NC	L 74–78
February 9*	South Carolina	Littlejohn Coliseum • Clemson, SC	L 88–91
February 12	at Virginia	University Hall • Charlottesville, VA	L 44–52
February 17	#2 North Carolina	Littlejohn Coliseum • Clemson, SC	W 77–69
February 19	Florida State	Littlejohn Coliseum • Clemson, SC	L 71–79
February 22	at Wake Forest	LJVM Coliseum • Winston-Salem, NC	L 69–80
February 26	Maryland	Littlejohn Coliseum • Clemson, SC	W 73–67
March 2	at NC State	Reynolds Coliseum • Raleigh, NC	W 82–63
March 5	at Georgia Tech	Alexander Memorial Coliseum • Atlanta, GA	L 79–90
March 10*	vs. NC State	Charlotte Coliseum • Charlotte, NC (ACC Tournament First round)	W 76–63
March 11*	vs. #5 Duke	Charlotte Coliseum • Charlotte, NC (ACC Tournament Quarterfinal)	L 64–77
March 17*	Southern Miss	Littlejohn Coliseum • Clemson, SC (NIT First round)	W 96–85
March 21*	West Virginia	WVU Coliseum • Morgantown, WV (NIT Second round)	W 96–79
March 23*	at Vanderbilt	Memorial Gymnasium • Nashville, TN (NIT Quarterfinal)	L 74–89
*Non-Conference Game. #Rankings from AP Poll released prior to game.

== 1994–95 ==
1994–95 Clemson Tigers men's basketball

NIT, first round
- Conference: Atlantic Coast Conference
- Record: 15–13 (5–11 ACC)
- Head coach: Rick Barnes
- Home arena: Littlejohn Coliseum

1994–95 ACC men's basketball standings
	Conf.				Overall
Team	W		L	PCT	W		L	PCT
No. 3 Wake Forest †	12	–	4	.750	26	–	6	.813
No. 4 North Carolina	12	–	4	.750	28	–	6	.824
No. 10 Maryland	12	–	4	.750	26	–	8	.765
No. 13 Virginia	12	–	4	.750	25	–	9	.735
Georgia Tech	8	–	8	.500	18	–	12	.600
Florida State	5	–	11	.313	12	–	15	.444
Clemson	5	–	11	.313	15	–	13	.536
NC State	4	–	12	.250	12	–	15	.444
Duke	2	–	14	.125	13	–	18	.419
† 1995 ACC tournament winner Rankings from AP poll

Date	Opponent	Rank^{#}	Site	Result
November 29*	Charleston Southern		Littlejohn Coliseum • Clemson, SC	W 96–66
December 3*	Winthrop		Littlejohn Coliseum • Clemson, SC	W 98–71
December 5*	Mercer		Littlejohn Coliseum • Clemson, SC	W 70–51
December 8*	at South Carolina		Carolina Coliseum • Columbia, SC	W 83–59
December 10*	vs. Appalachian State		Greensboro Coliseum • Greensboro, NC	W 81–66
December 18*	The Citadel		Littlejohn Coliseum • Clemson, SC	W 77–66
December 20*	Miami (FL)		Littlejohn Coliseum • Clemson, SC	W 75–55
December 29*	Morgan State		Littlejohn Coliseum • Clemson, SC	W 60–40
January 4	at #9 Duke		Cameron Indoor Stadium • Durham, NC	W 75–70
January 7*	Texas A&M		Littlejohn Coliseum • Clemson, SC	W 66–41
January 11	at Virginia	#18	University Hall • Charlottesville, VA	L 37–61
January 14	#2 North Carolina	#18	Littlejohn Coliseum • Clemson, SC	L 66–83
January 18	Florida State		Littlejohn Coliseum • Clemson, SC	L 66–67
January 21	at #16 Wake Forest		LJVM Coliseum • Winston-Salem, NC	L 60–69
January 25	#8 Maryland		Littlejohn Coliseum • Clemson, SC	L 51–56
January 28	at NC State		Reynolds Coliseum • Raleigh, NC	W 60–55
February 1	at #21 Georgia Tech		Alexander Memorial Coliseum • Atlanta, GA	L 50–80
February 4	Duke		Littlejohn Coliseum • Clemson, SC	W 51–44
February 8*	Furman		Littlejohn Coliseum • Clemson, SC	W 69–63
February 11	#17 Virginia		Littlejohn Coliseum • Clemson, SC	L 44–62
February 16	at #2 North Carolina		Dean Smith Center • Chapel Hill, NC	L 39–66
February 18	at Florida State		Tallahassee-Leon County Civic Center • Tallahassee, FL	L 57–62
February 22	#12 Wake Forest		Littlejohn Coliseum • Clemson, SC	L 52–64
February 25	at #7 Maryland		Cole Field House • College Park, MD	L 68–84
March 1	NC State		Littlejohn Coliseum • Clemson, SC	W 62–45
March 4	Georgia Tech		Littlejohn Coliseum • Clemson, SC	W 65–63
March 10*	vs. #3 North Carolina		Greensboro Coliseum • Greensboro, NC (ACC Tournament Quarterfinal)	L 62–78
March 17*	at Virginia Tech		Cassell Coliseum • Blacksburg, VA (NIT First round)	L 54–62
*Non-Conference Game. #Rankings from AP Poll released prior to game.

== 1995–96 ==
1995–96 Clemson Tigers men's basketball

NCAA tournament, first round
- Conference: Atlantic Coast Conference
- Record: 18–11 (7–9 ACC)
- Head coach: Rick Barnes
- Home arena: Littlejohn Coliseum

1995–96 ACC men's basketball standings
	Conf.				Overall
Team	W		L	PCT	W		L	PCT
No. 13 Georgia Tech	13	–	3	.813	24	–	12	.667
No. 9 Wake Forest †	12	–	4	.750	26	–	6	.813
No. 25 North Carolina	10	–	6	.625	21	–	11	.656
Duke	8	–	8	.500	18	–	13	.581
Maryland	8	–	8	.500	17	–	13	.567
Clemson	7	–	9	.438	18	–	11	.621
Virginia	6	–	10	.375	12	–	15	.444
Florida State	5	–	11	.313	13	–	14	.481
NC State	3	–	13	.188	15	–	16	.484
† 1996 ACC tournament winner Rankings from AP poll

Date	Opponent	Rank^{#}	Site	Result
November 26*	UNC–Asheville		Littlejohn Coliseum • Clemson, SC	W 83–41
November 29*	Appalachian State		Littlejohn Coliseum • Clemson, SC	W 91–55
December 2*	at Winthrop		Winthrop Coliseum • Rock Hill, SC	W 79–63
December 6*	Charleston Southern		Littlejohn Coliseum • Clemson, SC	W 79–60
December 9*	South Carolina		Littlejohn Coliseum • Clemson, SC	W 72–58
December 16*	Furman		Littlejohn Coliseum • Clemson, SC	W 79–61
December 19*	Minnesota		Littlejohn Coliseum • Clemson, SC	W 79–66
December 23*	at Miami (FL)		Miami Arena • Miami, FL	W 66–52 (OT)
December 30*	Campbell	#24	Littlejohn Coliseum • Clemson, SC	W 67–43
January 3	#19 Duke	#22	Littlejohn Coliseum • Clemson, SC	W 51–48
January 10	Virginia	#16	Littlejohn Coliseum • Clemson, SC	W 89–79
January 14	at #10 North Carolina	#16	Dean Smith Center • Chapel Hill, NC	L 53–86
January 17	at Florida State	#19	Tallahassee-Leon County Civic Center • Tallahassee, FL	L 62–75
January 21	#6 Wake Forest	#19	Littlejohn Coliseum • Clemson, SC	W 55–41
January 24	at Maryland	#18	Cole Field House • College Park, MD	L 60–65
January 27	NC State	#18	Littlejohn Coliseum • Clemson, SC	L 61–64
January 30	#25 Georgia Tech	#24	Littlejohn Coliseum • Clemson, SC	W 73–70
February 3	at Duke	#24	Cameron Indoor Stadium • Durham, NC	L 53–83
February 6*	Wofford		Littlejohn Coliseum • Clemson, SC	W 77–28
February 10	at Virginia		University Hall • Charlottesville, VA	L 51–62
February 14	#17 North Carolina		Littlejohn Coliseum • Clemson, SC	L 48–53
February 17	Florida State		Littlejohn Coliseum • Clemson, SC	W 67–59
February 21	at #10 Wake Forest		LJVM Coliseum • Winston-Salem, NC	L 48–68
February 24	Maryland		Littlejohn Coliseum • Clemson, SC	W 68–61
February 28	at NC State		Reynolds Coliseum • Raleigh, NC	W 80–76
March 3	at #18 Georgia Tech		Alexander Memorial Coliseum • Atlanta, GA	L 74–87
March 8*	vs. #20 North Carolina		Greensboro Coliseum • Greensboro, NC (ACC Tournament Quarterfinal)	W 75–73
March 9*	vs. Wake Forest		Greensboro Coliseum • Greensboro, NC (ACC Tournament Semifinal)	L 60–68
March 14*	vs. Georgia		University Arena • Albuquerque, NM (NCAA Tournament First round)	L 74–81
*Non-Conference Game. #Rankings from AP Poll released prior to game.

== 1996–97 ==
1996–97 Clemson Tigers men's basketball

NCAA tournament, Sweet Sixteen
- Conference: Atlantic Coast Conference

Ranking
- Coaches: No. 8
- AP: No. 14
- Record: 23–10 (9–7 ACC)
- Head coach: Rick Barnes
- Home arena: Littlejohn Coliseum

1996–97 ACC men's basketball standings
	Conf.				Overall
Team	W		L	PCT	W		L	PCT
No. 8 Duke	12	–	4	.750	24	–	9	.727
No. 9 Wake Forest	11	–	5	.688	24	–	7	.774
No. 4 North Carolina †	11	–	5	.688	28	–	7	.800
No. 14 Clemson	9	–	7	.563	23	–	10	.697
No. 22 Maryland	9	–	7	.563	21	–	11	.656
Virginia	7	–	9	.438	18	–	13	.581
Florida State	6	–	10	.375	20	–	12	.625
NC State	4	–	12	.250	17	–	15	.531
Georgia Tech	3	–	13	.188	9	–	18	.333
† 1997 ACC tournament winner Rankings from AP poll

Date	Opponent	Rank^{#}	Site	Result
November 15*	vs. #3 Kentucky	#20	RCA Dome • Indianapolis, IN (BCA Classic)	W 79–71 (OT)
November 23*	Coastal Carolina	#12	Littlejohn Coliseum • Clemson, SC	W 70–47
November 29*	vs. Delaware	#10	Mario Morales Coliseum • Guaynabo, PR (San Juan Shootout Quarterfinal)	W 78–71
November 30*	vs. Missouri	#10	Mario Morales Coliseum • Guaynabo, PR (San Juan Shootout Semifinal)	W 47–45
December 1*	vs. #24 Minnesota	#10	Mario Morales Coliseum • Guaynabo, PR (San Juan Shootout Final)	L 65–75
December 4*	Furman	#12	Littlejohn Coliseum • Clemson, SC	W 82–55
December 7	at #25 Virginia	#12	University Hall • Charlottesville, VA	W 62–52
December 14*	Charleston Southern	#10	Littlejohn Coliseum • Clemson, SC	W 80–57
December 17*	at South Carolina	#8	Carolina Coliseum • Columbia, SC	W 58–39
December 20*	Wofford	#8	Littlejohn Coliseum • Clemson, SC	W 89–49
December 22*	at Texas A&M	#8	G. Rollie White Coliseum • College Station, TX	W 76–64
December 30*	Marshall	#5	Littlejohn Coliseum • Clemson, SC	W 73–57
January 4*	South Carolina State	#5	Littlejohn Coliseum • Clemson, SC	W 63–44
January 7	#10 Duke	#5	Littlejohn Coliseum • Clemson, SC	W 86–82 (OT)
January 11	at Florida State	#5	Tallahassee-Leon County Civic Center • Tallahassee, FL	W 76–70
January 15	at #11 Maryland	#3	Cole Field House • College Park, MD	W 67–63
January 18	NC State	#3	Littlejohn Coliseum • Clemson, SC	W 51–42
January 23	#4 Wake Forest	#2	Littlejohn Coliseum • Clemson, SC	L 62–65
January 26	at #19 North Carolina	#2	Dean Smith Center • Chapel Hill, NC	L 48–61
January 30	Georgia Tech	#7	Littlejohn Coliseum • Clemson, SC	W 70–57
February 1	at NC State	#7	Reynolds Coliseum • Raleigh, NC	L 54–58
February 4*	Western Kentucky	#10	Littlejohn Coliseum • Clemson, SC	W 69–55
February 8	#7 Maryland	#10	Littlejohn Coliseum • Clemson, SC	W 80–68
February 12	at #2 Wake Forest	#7	LJVM Coliseum • Winston-Salem, NC	L 49–55
February 15	Virginia	#7	Littlejohn Coliseum • Clemson, SC	W 71–65
February 18	at #6 Duke	#8	Cameron Indoor Stadium • Durham, NC	L 77–84
February 23	Florida State	#8	Littlejohn Coliseum • Clemson, SC	L 65–67
February 26	#8 North Carolina	#12	Littlejohn Coliseum • Clemson, SC	L 69–76
March 1	at Georgia Tech	#12	Alexander Memorial Coliseum • Atlanta, GA	W 55–53
March 7*	vs. #22 Maryland	#13	Greensboro Coliseum • Greensboro, NC (ACC Tournament Quarterfinal)	L 61–76
March 14*	vs. Miami (OH)	#14	Kemper Arena • Kansas City, MO (NCAA Tournament First round)	W 68–56
March 16*	vs. Tulsa	#14	Kemper Arena • Kansas City, MO (NCAA Tournament Second round)	W 65–59
March 20*	vs. #3 Minnesota	#14	Alamodome • San Antonio, TX (NCAA Tournament Sweet Sixteen)	L 84–90 (2OT)
*Non-Conference Game. #Rankings from AP Poll released prior to game.

== 1997–98 ==
1997–98 Clemson Tigers men's basketball

NCAA tournament, first round
- Conference: Atlantic Coast Conference
- Record: 18–14 (7–9 ACC)
- Head coach: Rick Barnes
- Home arena: Littlejohn Coliseum

1997–98 ACC men's basketball standings
	Conf.				Overall
Team	W		L	PCT	W		L	PCT
No. 3 Duke	15	–	1	.938	32	–	4	.889
No. 1 North Carolina†	13	–	3	.813	34	–	4	.895
No. 20 Maryland	10	–	6	.625	21	–	11	.656
Wake Forest	7	–	9	.438	16	–	14	.533
Clemson	7	–	9	.438	18	–	14	.563
Georgia Tech	6	–	10	.375	19	–	14	.576
Florida State	6	–	10	.375	18	–	4	.818
NC State	5	–	11	.313	17	–	15	.531
Virginia	3	–	13	.188	11	–	19	.367
† 1998 ACC tournament winner Rankings from AP poll

Date	Opponent	Rank^{#}	Site	Result
November 14*	UNC–Wilmington	#5	Littlejohn Coliseum • Clemson, SC	W 67–50
November 21*	vs. Iona	#5	Patty Center • Fairbanks, Alaska (Top of the World Classic Quarterfinal)	W 79–49
November 22*	vs. Southwest Missouri St.	#5	Patty Center • Fairbanks, AK (Top of the World Classic Semifinal)	W 71–67
November 23*	vs. Gonzaga	#5	Patty Center • Fairbanks, AK (Top of the World Classic Final)	L 71–84
November 29*	vs. #7 Kentucky	#12	America West Arena • Phoenix, AZ (Premier Classic)	L 61–76
December 4	#23 Maryland	#17	Littlejohn Coliseum • Clemson, SC	W 78–65 (OT)
December 6*	Furman	#17	Littlejohn Coliseum • Clemson, SC	W 71–62
December 13*	at Illinois	#17	United Center • Chicago, IL	L 61–71
December 17*	#6 South Carolina		Littlejohn Coliseum • Clemson, SC	W 62–57
December 19*	at Seton Hall		Continental Airlines Arena • East Rutherford, NJ	W 62–59
December 22*	Charleston Southern	#21	Littlejohn Coliseum • Clemson, SC	W 65–42
December 28*	at South Carolina State	#21	SHM Memorial Center • Orangeburg, SC	W 84–60
December 30*	at Western Kentucky	#21	E. A. Diddle Arena • Bowling Green, KY	W 71–52
January 3	#1 North Carolina	#21	Littlejohn Coliseum • Clemson, SC	L 70–73
January 8	at Wake Forest	#24	LJVM Coliseum • Winston-Salem, NC	L 66–70
January 13	#17 Florida State		Littlejohn Coliseum • Clemson, SC	W 86–65
January 17	at #2 Duke		Cameron Indoor Stadium • Durham, NC	L 80–81
January 20	Virginia	#25	Littlejohn Coliseum • Clemson, SC	W 69–52
January 24	at Maryland	#25	Cole Field House • College Park, MD	L 69–74
January 28	at #2 North Carolina		Dean Smith Center • Chapel Hill, NC	L 79–88
January 31	NC State		Littlejohn Coliseum • Clemson, SC	L 80–82 (OT)
February 4	at Georgia Tech		Alexander Memorial Coliseum • Atlanta, GA	L 52–70
February 7	Wake Forest		Littlejohn Coliseum • Clemson, SC	W 71–46
February 11*	Western Carolina		Littlejohn Coliseum • Clemson, SC	W 102–67
February 15	at Florida State		Tallahassee-Leon County Civic Center • Tallahassee, FL	W 78–49
February 18	#2 Duke		Littlejohn Coliseum • Clemson, SC	L 66–70
February 21	at Virginia		University Hall • Charlottesville, VA	L 74–78 (OT)
February 26	at NC State		Reynolds Coliseum • Raleigh, NC	W 77–72
March 1	Georgia Tech		Littlejohn Coliseum • Clemson, SC	W 76–62
March 6*	vs. Wake Forest		Greensboro Coliseum • Greensboro, NC (ACC Tournament Quarterfinal)	W 75–56
March 7*	vs. #1 Duke		Greensboro Coliseum • Greensboro, NC (ACC Tournament Semifinal)	L 64–66
March 13*	vs. Western Michigan		United Center • Chicago, IL (NCAA Tournament First round)	L 72–75
*Non-Conference Game. #Rankings from AP Poll released prior to game.

== 1998–99 ==
1998–99 Clemson Tigers men's basketball

NIT, Runner-Up
- Conference: Atlantic Coast Conference
- Record: 20–15 (5–11 ACC)
- Head coach: Larry Shyatt
- Home arena: Littlejohn Coliseum

1998–99 ACC men's basketball standings
	Conf.				Overall
Team	W		L	PCT	W		L	PCT
No. 1 Duke †	16	–	0	1.000	37	–	2	.949
No. 5 Maryland	13	–	3	.813	28	–	6	.824
No. 13 North Carolina	10	–	6	.625	24	–	10	.706
Wake Forest	7	–	9	.438	17	–	14	.548
NC State	6	–	10	.375	19	–	14	.576
Georgia Tech	6	–	10	.375	15	–	16	.484
Clemson	5	–	11	.313	20	–	15	.571
Florida State	5	–	11	.313	13	–	17	.433
Virginia	4	–	12	.250	14	–	16	.467
† 1999 ACC tournament winner Rankings from AP Poll

Date	Opponent	Rank^{#}	Site	Result
November 13*	Arkansas–Pine Bluff		Littlejohn Coliseum • Clemson, SC	W 83–59
November 16*	Stetson	#24	Littlejohn Coliseum • Clemson, SC	W 66–39
November 19*	Western Carolina	#24	Littlejohn Coliseum • Clemson, SC	W 82–56
November 23*	vs. Michigan	#22	Lahaina Civic Center • Lahaina, HI (Maui Classic Quarterfinal)	L 56–59
November 24*	vs. Chaminade	#22	Lahaina Civic Center • Lahaina, HI (Maui Classic Consolation)	W 72–60
November 25*	vs. Kansas State	#22	Lahaina Civic Center • Lahaina, HI (Maui Classic Consolation)	W 79–45
November 30*	Radford	#24	Littlejohn Coliseum • Clemson, SC	W 70–37
December 3*	East Tennessee St.	#24	Littlejohn Coliseum • Clemson, SC	W 82–54
December 12*	UNC–Asheville	#17	Littlejohn Coliseum • Clemson, SC	W 73–64
December 16*	South Carolina	#16	Carolina Coliseum • Columbia, SC	W 70–66
December 21*	South Carolina State	#16	Littlejohn Coliseum • Clemson, SC	W 72–47
December 26*	at Furman	#16	Bi-Lo Center • Greenville, SC	W 67–54
December 29*	Illinois	#14	Bi-Lo Center • Greenville, SC	L 50–67
January 2	at #9 North Carolina	#14	Dean Smith Center • Chapel Hill, NC	L 53–69
January 5	NC State	#21	Littlejohn Coliseum • Clemson, SC	W 80–72
January 9	Wake Forest	#21	Littlejohn Coliseum • Clemson, SC	L 61–64
January 12	at Florida State	#25	Tallahassee-Leon County Civic Center • Tallahassee, FL	L 64–70
January 17	at Virginia	#25	University Hall • Charlottesville, VA	L 58–65
January 20	#2 Duke		Littlejohn Coliseum • Clemson, SC	L 60–82
January 24	#4 Maryland		Littlejohn Coliseum • Clemson, SC	L 79–81 (OT)
January 28	at Georgia Tech		Alexander Memorial Coliseum • Atlanta, GA	L 62–66
February 4	#9 North Carolina		Littlejohn Coliseum • Clemson, SC	W 78–63
February 6	at NC State		Reynolds Coliseum • Raleigh, NC	L 71–84
February 10	at Wake Forest		LJVM Coliseum • Winston-Salem, NC	L 69–79
February 14	Florida State		Littlejohn Coliseum • Clemson, SC	W 78–45
February 17	Virginia		Littlejohn Coliseum • Clemson, SC	W 88–65
February 20	at #1 Duke		Cameron Indoor Stadium • Durham, NC	L 65–92
February 24	at #5 Maryland		Cole Field House • College Park, MD	L 60–77
February 28	Georgia Tech		Littlejohn Coliseum • Clemson, SC	W 92–64
March 4*	vs. Florida State		Charlotte Coliseum • Charlotte, NC (ACC Tournament First round)	L 85–87 (OT)
March 10*	Georgia		Littlejohn Coliseum • Clemson, SC (NIT First round)	W 77–57
March 16*	at Rutgers		Louis Brown Athletic Center • Piscataway, NJ (NIT Second round)	W 78–68
March 18*	Butler		Littlejohn Coliseum • Clemson, SC (NIT Third round)	W 89–69
March 23*	vs. Xavier		Madison Square Garden • New York, NY (NIT Semifinal)	W 79–76
March 25*	vs. California		Madison Square Garden • New York, NY (NIT Final)	L 60–61
*Non-Conference Game. #Rankings from AP Poll released prior to game.
