= 1995–96 Gonzaga Bulldogs men's basketball team =

American college basketball season

1995–96 Gonzaga Bulldogs men's basketball

WCC regular season co-champion

National Invitation Tournament, First round
- Conference: West Coast Conference
- Record: 21–9 (10–4 WCC)
- Head coach: Dan Fitzgerald (14th season)
- Assistant coaches: Dan Monson (8th season); Mark Few (7th season); Bill Grier (5th season)
- Home arena: Charlotte Y. Martin Centre

1995–96 West Coast Conference men's basketball standings
	Conf.				Overall
Team	W		L	PCT	W		L	PCT
Santa Clara	10	–	4	.714	20	–	9	.690
Gonzaga	10	–	4	.714	21	–	9	.700
Loyola Marymount	8	–	6	.571	18	–	11	.621
San Francisco	8	–	6	.571	15	–	12	.556
Portland †	7	–	7	.500	19	–	11	.633
San Diego	6	–	8	.429	14	–	14	.500
Saint Mary's	5	–	9	.357	12	–	15	.444
Pepperdine	2	–	12	.143	10	–	18	.357
† Conference tournament winner Rankings from AP poll

The 1995–96 Gonzaga Bulldogs men's basketball team represented Gonzaga University in the West Coast Conference (WCC) during the 1995–96 NCAA Division I men's basketball season. Led by fourteenth-year head coach Dan Fitzgerald, the Bulldogs were 19–7 (.731) overall in the regular season (10–4 in WCC, tied for first), and played their home games on campus at the Charlotte Y. Martin Centre in Spokane, Washington.

In November 1995, athletic director Fitzgerald announced this season would be his penultimate as head coach, with plans to promote longtime assistant Dan Monson in the spring of 1997.

Regular season co-champion, Gonzaga advanced to the final of the WCC tournament at Santa Clara, but fell to fifth seed Portland. Ten days later in the National Invitation Tournament (NIT), the Bulldogs traveled to south to Pullman and lost to Washington State by nineteen points to finish at 21–9 (.700).

== Postseason results ==
Date time, TV	Rank^{#}	Opponent^{#}	Result	Record	Site (attendance) city, state
WCC tournament
Sat, March 2; 12:00 pm, PSN	(2)	vs. (7) Saint Mary's; Quarterfinal	W 64–54	20–7	Toso Pavilion; Santa Clara, California
Sun, March 3; 5:00 pm, PSN	(2)	vs. (8) Pepperdine; Semifinal	W 76–48	21–7	Toso Pavilion; Santa Clara, California
Mon, March 4; 9:00 pm, ESPN	(2)	vs. (5) Portland; Final	L 68–76	21–8	Toso Pavilion (2,350); Santa Clara, California
National Invitation tournament
Thu, March 14; 7:00 pm		at Washington State; First round	L 73–92	21–9	Beasley Coliseum (6,985); Pullman, Washington
*Non-conference game. ^{#}Rankings from AP poll. (#) Tournament seedings in parentheses. All times are in Pacific time.
