= 1995–96 Wake Forest Demon Deacons men's basketball team =

American college basketball season

1995–96 Wake Forest Demon Deacons men's basketball

ACC tournament champions

NCAA tournament, regional final
- Conference: Atlantic Coast Conference

Ranking
- Coaches: No. 9
- AP: No. 9
- Record: 26–6 (12–4 ACC)
- Head coach: Dave Odom (7th season)
- Assistant coaches: Ricky Stokes; Russell Turner
- Home arena: LJVM Coliseum

1995–96 ACC men's basketball standings
	Conf.				Overall
Team	W		L	PCT	W		L	PCT
No. 13 Georgia Tech	13	–	3	.813	24	–	12	.667
No. 9 Wake Forest †	12	–	4	.750	26	–	6	.813
No. 25 North Carolina	10	–	6	.625	21	–	11	.656
Duke	8	–	8	.500	18	–	13	.581
Maryland	8	–	8	.500	17	–	13	.567
Clemson	7	–	9	.438	18	–	11	.621
Virginia	6	–	10	.375	12	–	15	.444
Florida State	5	–	11	.313	13	–	14	.481
NC State	3	–	13	.188	15	–	16	.484
† 1996 ACC tournament winner Rankings from AP poll

The 1995–96 Wake Forest Demon Deacons men's basketball team represented Wake Forest University as members of the Atlantic Coast Conference during the 1995–96 men's college basketball season. The team was led by 7th year head coach Dave Odom, and played their home games at LJVM Coliseum.

Entering league play as the defending regular season champions, the Deacons finished second in the ACC regular season standings. The team then defeated Virginia, Clemson, and Georgia Tech to capture the ACC tournament crown for the second straight season. Wake Forest was assigned the No. 2 seed in the Midwest region of the NCAA tournament. After defeating No. 15 seed Louisiana–Monroe, No. 10 seed Texas, and No. 6 seed Louisville to reach the Elite Eight, the team was blown out by No. 1 seed and eventual National champion Kentucky in the regional final. Wake Forest finished the season with a 26–6 and a No. 9 ranking in both major polls.

Junior forward/center Tim Duncan was named ACC Player of the Year and a Consensus First-team All-American.

== Previous season ==
Wake Forest finished in a four-way tie for the ACC regular season title with a 12–4 conference record. The team defeated Duke, Virginia, and North Carolina (in OT) to win the ACC tournament and receive the No. 1 seed in the East region of the NCAA tournament. After defeating No. 16 seed North Carolina A&T and No. 9 seed Saint Louis to reach the Sweet Sixteen, Wake Forest was knocked off by No. 4 seed and eventual Final Four participant Oklahoma State, 71–66, to finish the season with a 26–6 record. The Demon Deacons were No. 3 in the final AP poll and No. 9 in the final Coaches poll.

Senior guard Randolph Childress was named a consensus second-team All-American and ACC Athlete of the Year. Coach Odom was named ACC Coach of the Year for the second season in a row and third time overall.

== Roster ==
1995–96 Wake Forest Demon Deacons men's basketball team
Players
Coaches

Pos.	#	Name	Height	Weight	Year	Previous school	Hometown
G	5	Steve Goolsby	6 ft 4 in (1.93 m)	194 lb (88 kg)	So	Marietta HS	Marietta, GA
G	10	Rusty LaRue	6 ft 2 in (1.88 m)	185 lb (84 kg)	Sr	Northwest Guilford	Oak Ridge, NC
G/F	11	Joseph Amonett	6 ft 5 in (1.96 m)	200 lb (91 kg)	Fr	Pickett County	Byrdstown, TN
G	15	Armond Wilson	6 ft 2 in (1.88 m)	—	Fr	Northeast Jones	Laurel, MS
G	20	Marc Scott	6 ft 2 in (1.88 m)	185 lb (84 kg)	Jr	—	Chapel Hill, NC
F/C	21	Tim Duncan	6 ft 11 in (2.11 m)	240 lb (109 kg)	Jr	St. Dunstan's Episcopal	Saint Croix, U.S. Virgin Islands
F	23	Antonio Jackson	6 ft 8 in (2.03 m)	200 lb (91 kg)	So	Aliceville HS	Aliceville, AL
G	25	Jerry Braswell	6 ft 1 in (1.85 m)	180 lb (82 kg)	So	Randolph-Clay	Cuthbert, GA
G	30	Tony Rutland	6 ft 2 in (1.88 m)	183 lb (83 kg)	So	Bethel	Hampton, VA
F	44	Ricky Peral	6 ft 10 in (2.08 m)	230 lb (104 kg)	Jr	—	Valladolid, Spain
C	52	William Stringfellow	6 ft 8 in (2.03 m)	210 lb (95 kg)	Fr	Alief Hastings	Austin, TX
F	53	Ken Herbst	6 ft 6 in (1.98 m)	—	Jr	—	Winston-Salem, NC

Head coach

- Dave Odom

Assistant coach(es)

- Ricky Stokes

Legend

- (C) Team captain
- (S) Suspended
- (I) Ineligible
- (W) Walk-on
- Injured
- Current redshirt

Roster
Last update: March 24, 2020

== Schedule and results ==
Date time, TV	Rank^{#}	Opponent^{#}	Result	Record	Site city, state
Regular season
Nov 25, 1995*	No. 11	Mount St. Mary's	W 75–62	1–0	LJVM Coliseum; Winston-Salem, North Carolina
Nov 29, 1995*	No. 10	vs. Oklahoma State; Great 8	W 69–53	2–0	Palace of Auburn Hills; Auburn Hills, Michigan
Dec 2, 1995*	No. 10	Lehigh	W 68–53	3–0	LJVM Coliseum; Winston-Salem, North Carolina
Dec 6, 1995*	No. 10	at No. 3 UMass	L 46–60	3–1	Mullins Center (9,493); Amherst, Massachusetts
Dec 9, 1995*	No. 10	at Florida	W 77–53	4–1	Stephen C. O'Connell Center; Gainesville, Florida
Dec 18, 1995*	No. 12	Appalachian State	W 91–50	5–1	LJVM Coliseum; Winston-Salem, North Carolina
Dec 21, 1995*	No. 12	No. 13 Utah	W 60–56	6–1	LJVM Coliseum; Winston-Salem, North Carolina
Jan 2, 1996*	No. 12	Furman	W 81–49	7–1	LJVM Coliseum; Winston-Salem, North Carolina
Jan 6, 1996	No. 12	at Florida State	W 75–73 ^{OT}	8–1 (1–0)	Donald L. Tucker Center; Tallahassee, Florida
Jan 10, 1996	No. 8	at Duke	W 57–54	9–1 (2–0)	Cameron Indoor Stadium; Durham, North Carolina
Jan 13, 1996	No. 8	Maryland	W 77–64	10–1 (3–0)	LJVM Coliseum; Winston-Salem, North Carolina
Jan 15, 1996*	No. 6	Richmond	W 71–60	11–1	LJVM Coliseum; Winston-Salem, North Carolina
Jan 17, 1996	No. 6	Georgia Tech	W 66–63	12–1 (4–0)	LJVM Coliseum; Winston-Salem, North Carolina
Jan 21, 1996	No. 6	at No. 19 Clemson	L 41–55	12–2 (4–1)	Littlejohn Coliseum; Clemson, South Carolina
Jan 24, 1996	No. 9	Virginia	W 81–64	13–2 (5–1)	LJVM Coliseum; Winston-Salem, North Carolina
Jan 27, 1996	No. 9	at No. 11 North Carolina	L 59–65	13–3 (5–2)	Dean Smith Center; Chapel Hill, North Carolina
Jan 31, 1996	No. 12	NC State	W 66–62	14–3 (6–2)	LJVM Coliseum; Winston-Salem, North Carolina
Feb 7, 1996	No. 9	Florida State	W 81–67	15–3 (7–2)	LJVM Coliseum; Winston-Salem, North Carolina
Feb 11, 1996	No. 9	Duke	W 79–65	16–3 (8–2)	LJVM Coliseum; Winston-Salem, North Carolina
Feb 15, 1996	No. 8	at Maryland	W 85–78	17–3 (9–2)	Cole Fieldhouse; College Park, Maryland
Feb 17, 1996	No. 8	at Georgia Tech	L 63–64	17–4 (9–3)	Alexander Memorial Coliseum; Atlanta, Georgia
Feb 21, 1996	No. 10	Clemson	W 64–48	18–4 (10–3)	LJVM Coliseum; Winston-Salem, North Carolina
Feb 24, 1996	No. 10	at Virginia	L 49–67	18–5 (10–4)	University Hall; Charlottesville, Virginia
Feb 27, 1996	No. 13	No. 19 North Carolina	W 84–60	19–5 (11–4)	LJVM Coliseum; Winston-Salem, North Carolina
Mar 2, 1996*	No. 13	at NC State	W 72–70	20–5 (12–4)	Reynolds Coliseum; Raleigh, North Carolina
ACC Tournament
Mar 8, 1996*	No. 12	Virginia; ACC Tournament Quarterfinal	W 70–60	21–5	Greensboro Coliseum; Greensboro, North Carolina
Mar 9, 1996*	No. 12	vs. Clemson; ACC Tournament Semifinal	W 68–60	22–5	Greensboro Coliseum; Greensboro, North Carolina
Mar 10, 1996*	No. 12	No. 18 Georgia Tech; ACC tournament championship	W 75–74	23–5	Greensboro Coliseum; Greensboro, North Carolina
NCAA Tournament
Mar 15, 1996*	(2 MW) No. 9	vs. (15 MW) Northeast Louisiana; First round	W 62–50	24–5	Bradley Center; Milwaukee, Wisconsin
Mar 17, 1996*	(2 MW) No. 9	vs. (10 MW) Texas; Second round	W 65–62	25–5	Bradley Center; Milwaukee, Wisconsin
Mar 21, 1996*	(2 MW) No. 9	vs. (6 MW) No. 24 Louisville; Regional semifinal – Sweet Sixteen	W 60–59	26–5	Hubert H. Humphrey Metrodome; Minneapolis, Minnesota
Mar 23, 1996*	(2 MW) No. 9	vs. (1 MW) No. 2 Kentucky; Regional final – Elite Eight	L 63–83	26–6	Hubert H. Humphrey Metrodome; Minneapolis, Minnesota
*Non-conference game. ^{#}Rankings from AP poll. (#) Tournament seedings in parentheses. MW=Midwest. All times are in Eastern.

== Rankings ==
Ranking movements Legend: ██ Increase in ranking ██ Decrease in ranking
	Week																		
Poll	Pre	1	2	3	4	5	6	7	8	9	10	11	12	13	14	15	16	17	Final
AP	11	11	10	10	11	12	14	12	8	6	9	12	9	8	10	13	12	9	Not released
Coaches	8	8	7	8	11	12	13	11	8	6	8	10	9	9	10	12	10	9	9

== Awards and honors ==
- Tim Duncan – ACC Player of the Year, Consensus First-team All-American
