= 1995–96 Virginia Cavaliers men's basketball team =

American college basketball season

1995–1996 Virginia Cavaliers men's basketball
- Conference: Atlantic Coast Conference
- Record: 12–15 (6–10 ACC)
- Head coach: Jeff Jones (6th season)
- Assistant coaches: Anthony Solomon (2nd season); Tom Perrin (9th season); Pete Herrmann (2nd season)
- Home arena: University Hall

1995–96 ACC men's basketball standings
	Conf.				Overall
Team	W		L	PCT	W		L	PCT
No. 13 Georgia Tech	13	–	3	.813	24	–	12	.667
No. 9 Wake Forest †	12	–	4	.750	26	–	6	.813
No. 25 North Carolina	10	–	6	.625	21	–	11	.656
Duke	8	–	8	.500	18	–	13	.581
Maryland	8	–	8	.500	17	–	13	.567
Clemson	7	–	9	.438	18	–	11	.621
Virginia	6	–	10	.375	12	–	15	.444
Florida State	5	–	11	.313	13	–	14	.481
NC State	3	–	13	.188	15	–	16	.484
† 1996 ACC tournament winner Rankings from AP poll

The 1995–96 Virginia Cavaliers men's basketball team represented the University of Virginia during the 1995–96 NCAA Division I men's basketball season. The team was led by sixth-year head coach Jeff Jones, and played their home games at University Hall in Charlottesville, Virginia as members of the Atlantic Coast Conference.

== Last season ==
The Cavaliers had a record of 25–9.

== Roster ==
1995–96 Virginia Cavaliers men's basketball team
Players
Coaches

Pos.	#	Name	Height	Weight	Year	Hometown
G	5	Curtis Staples	6 ft 3 in (1.91 m)	181 lb (82 kg)	So	Roanoke, Virginia
G/F	13	Jamal Robinson	6 ft 7 in (2.01 m)	187 lb (85 kg)	Jr	Jamaica, New York
G	15	Peter McLaughlin	6 ft 2 in (1.88 m)	163 lb (74 kg)	So	Maplewood, New Jersey
G	21	Harold Deane	6 ft 2 in (1.88 m)	175 lb (79 kg)	Jr	Ettrick, Virginia
F	22	Darryl Presley	6 ft 6 in (1.98 m)	198 lb (90 kg)	Fr	Adelphi, Maryland
F	24	Scott Johnson	6 ft 10 in (2.08 m)	243 lb (110 kg)	Fr	Marietta, Georgia
F	25	Norman Nolan	6 ft 8 in (2.03 m)	243 lb (110 kg)	So	Baltimore, Maryland
F/C	30	Chris Alexander	6 ft 9 in (2.06 m)	234 lb (106 kg)	RS Sr	Long Branch, New Jersey
G	31	Michael Curtis	6 ft 3 in (1.91 m)	181 lb (82 kg)	So	Richmond, Virginia
G	32	Courtney Alexander	6 ft 6 in (1.98 m)	187 lb (85 kg)	Fr	Durham, North Carolina
C	42	Chase Metheney	7 ft 4 in (2.24 m)	239 lb (108 kg)	RS Fr	Charlotte, North Carolina
G/F	44	Maurice Watkins	6 ft 5 in (1.96 m)	202 lb (92 kg)	RS Jr	Petersburg, Virginia
F	55	Martin Walton	6 ft 9 in (2.06 m)	232 lb (105 kg)	Jr	Portsmouth, Virginia

Head coach

- Jeff Jones (Virginia)

Assistant coach(es)

- Anthony Solomon (Virginia)
- Tom Perrin (Vermont)
- Pete Herrmann (SUNY Geneseo)

Legend

- (C) Team captain
- (S) Suspended
- (I) Ineligible
- (W) Walk-on
- Injured
- Current redshirt

Roster

== Schedule ==
Date time, TV	Rank^{#}	Opponent^{#}	Result	Record	Site (attendance) city, state
Regular season
Nov. 24*	No. 17	UT Martin	W 84–65	1–0	University Hall (7,646); Charlottesville, Virginia
Nov. 27*	No. 15	William & Mary	W 87–58	2–0	University Hall (7,551); Charlottesville, Virginia
Nov. 29*	No. 15	vs. No. 2 Kansas	L 66-72	2–1	The Palace of Auburn Hills (12,222); Auburn Hills, Michigan
Dec. 5*	No. 15	Vanderbilt	L 48-61	2-2	University Hall (7,976); Charlottesville, Virginia
Dec. 9*	No. 15	at Richmond	W 67-52	3-2	Robins Center (9,032); Richmond, Virginia
Dec. 21*	No. 23	VCU	W 80-65	4-2	University Hall (7,804); Charlottesville, Virginia
Dec. 28*	No. 22	vs. No. 21 Virginia Tech	L 64-72	4-3	Roanoke Civic Center (10,056); Roanoke, Virginia
Dec. 30*	No. 22	Liberty	W 76-48	5-3	University Hall (6,448); Charlottesville, Virginia
Jan. 3		Florida State	L 64-69	5-4 (0-1)	University Hall (8,335); Charlottesville, Virginia
Jan. 6		NC State	W 73-69	6-4 (1-1)	University Hall (7,846); Charlottesville, Virginia
Jan. 10		at No. 16 Clemson	L 79-89	6-5 (1-2)	Littlejohn Coliseum (11,100); Clemson, South Carolina
Jan. 13		Duke	W 77-66	7-5 (2-2)	University Hall (7,242); Charlottesville, Virginia
Jan. 17		No. 10 North Carolina	L 53-67	7-6 (2-3)	University Hall (8,379); Charlottesville, Virginia
Jan. 20		at Georgia Tech	L 70-90	7-7 (2-4)	Alexander Memorial Coliseum (9,675); Atlanta, Georgia
Jan. 24		at No. 9 Wake Forest	L 64-81	7-8 (2-5)	Lawrence Joel Coliseum (13,894); Winston-Salem, North Carolina
Jan. 28*		at No. 4 Connecticut	L 46-76	7-9 (2-5)	Hartford Civic Center (16,294); Hartford, Connecticut
Feb. 1		Maryland	L 72-80	7-10 (2-6)	University Hall (7,336); Charlottesville, Virginia
Feb. 3		at Florida State	W 64-59	8-10 (3-6)	Donald L. Tucker Center (6,368); Tallahassee, Florida
Feb. 5*		Old Dominion	W 87-49	9-10 (3-6)	University Hall (7,519); Charlottesville, Virginia
Feb. 8		at NC State	W 84-82 ^{OT}	10-10 (4-6)	Reynolds Coliseum (12,400); Raleigh, North Carolina
Feb. 10		Clemson	W 62-51	11-10 (5-6)	University Hall (8,261); Charlottesville, Virginia
Feb. 14		at Duke	L 69-79	11-11 (5-7)	Cameron Indoor Stadium (9,314); Durham, North Carolina
Feb. 17		at No. 17 North Carolina	L 66-71	11-12 (5-8)	Dean Smith Center (21,572); Chapel Hill, North Carolina
Feb. 21		No. 23 Georgia Tech	L 75-84	11-13 (5-9)	University Hall (7,874); Charlottesville, Virginia
Feb. 24		No. 10 Wake Forest	W 67-49	12-13 (6-9)	University Hall (8,076); Charlottesville, Virginia
Mar. 2		at Maryland	L 71–83	12-14 (6-10)	Cole Field House (14,500); College Park, Maryland
ACC Tournament
Mar. 8		vs. No. 11 Wake Forest; ACC Tournament first round	L 60–70	12-15	Greensboro Coliseum (23,556); Greensboro, North Carolina
*Non-conference game. (#) Tournament seedings in parentheses. All times are in Eastern Time.
