= 1996 West Coast Conference men's basketball tournament =

- Classification: Division I
- Season: 1995–96
- Teams: 8
- Site: Toso Pavilion; Santa Clara, California
- Champions: Portland (1st title)
- Winning coach: Rob Chavez (1st title)
- MVP: Kweemada King (Portland)

1995–96 West Coast Conference men's basketball standings
	Conf.				Overall
Team	W		L	PCT	W		L	PCT
Santa Clara	10	–	4	.714	20	–	9	.690
Gonzaga	10	–	4	.714	21	–	9	.700
Loyola Marymount	8	–	6	.571	18	–	11	.621
San Francisco	8	–	6	.571	15	–	12	.556
Portland †	7	–	7	.500	19	–	11	.633
San Diego	6	–	8	.429	14	–	14	.500
Saint Mary's	5	–	9	.357	12	–	15	.444
Pepperdine	2	–	12	.143	10	–	18	.357
† Conference tournament winner Rankings from AP poll

The 1996 West Coast Conference men's basketball tournament took place on March 2–4, 1996. All rounds were held in Santa Clara, California, at the Toso Pavilion.

The Portland Pilots won the WCC Tournament title and an automatic bid to the 1996 NCAA tournament. Kweemada King of Portland was named Tournament MVP.

== Format ==
With eight teams participating, all eight teams were placed into the first round, with teams seeded and paired based on regular-season records. After the first round, teams were re-seeded so the highest-remaining team was paired with the lowest-remaining time in one semifinal with the other two teams slotted into the other semifinal.

== Bracket ==
Quarter finals Saturday, March 2
1	Santa Clara	60
8	Pepperdine	63
4	San Francisco	72
5	Portland	78
(Pairings are reseeded after the first round)
3	Loyola Marymount	51
6	San Diego	75
2	Gonzaga	64
7	Saint Mary's	54

Semi-finals; Sunday, March 3
2	Gonzaga	76
8	Pepperdine	48
5	Portland	65
6	San Diego	52

Finals; Monday, March 4
2	Gonzaga	68
5	Portland	76
