= 1995–96 North Carolina Tar Heels men's basketball team =

American college basketball season

1995–96 North Carolina Tar Heels men's basketball

ACC regular season co-champion

NCAA tournament, Round of 32
- Conference: Atlantic Coast Conference

Ranking
- Coaches: No. 24
- AP: No. 25
- Record: 21–11 (10–6 ACC)
- Head coach: Dean Smith (35th season)
- Assistant coaches: Bill Guthridge (29th season); Phil Ford (8th season); Dave Hanners (7th season)
- Home arena: Dean Smith Center

1995–96 ACC men's basketball standings
	Conf.				Overall
Team	W		L	PCT	W		L	PCT
No. 13 Georgia Tech	13	–	3	.813	24	–	12	.667
No. 9 Wake Forest †	12	–	4	.750	26	–	6	.813
No. 25 North Carolina	10	–	6	.625	21	–	11	.656
Duke	8	–	8	.500	18	–	13	.581
Maryland	8	–	8	.500	17	–	13	.567
Clemson	7	–	9	.438	18	–	11	.621
Virginia	6	–	10	.375	12	–	15	.444
Florida State	5	–	11	.313	13	–	14	.481
NC State	3	–	13	.188	15	–	16	.484
† 1996 ACC tournament winner Rankings from AP poll

The 1995–96 North Carolina Tar Heels men's basketball team represented the University of North Carolina at Chapel Hill. The head coach was Dean Smith. The team played its home games in Chapel Hill, North Carolina and was a member of the Atlantic Coast Conference.

== Roster ==
1995–96 North Carolina Tar Heels men's basketball team
Players
Coaches

Pos.	#	Name	Height	Weight	Year	Previous school	Hometown
G	3	Shammond Williams	6 ft 3 in (1.91 m)	189 lb (86 kg)	So	Fork Union Military	Greenville, South Carolina
F	4	Makhtar N'Diaye	6 ft 10 in (2.08 m)	231 lb (105 kg)	So	Oak Hill Academy	Dakar, Senegal
G	5	Jeff McInnis	6 ft 4 in (1.93 m)	179 lb (81 kg)	Jr	Oak Hill Academy	Charlotte, North Carolina
F/C	13	Ademola Okulaja	6 ft 9 in (2.06 m)	235 lb (107 kg)	Fr	John F. Kennedy High School	Berlin, Germany
G/F	15	Vince Carter	6 ft 0 in (1.83 m)	215 lb (98 kg)	Fr	Mainland High School	Daytona Beach, Florida
G	22	Scott Williams	5 ft 11 in (1.8 m)	156 lb (71 kg)	Fr	Lawrence	Lawrence, Kansas
F/C	33	Antawn Jamison	6 ft 9 in (2.06 m)	223 lb (101 kg)	Fr	Providence	Charlotte, North Carolina

Head coach

Dean Smith

Assistant coach(es)

Bill Guthridge, Phil Ford, Dave Hanners

Legend

- (C) Team captain
- (S) Suspended
- (I) Ineligible
- (W) Walk-on
- Injured
- Current redshirt

== Schedule and results ==
Date time, TV	Rank^{#}	Opponent^{#}	Result	Record	Site city, state
Regular season
Nov 20, 1995*	No. 20	vs. Vanderbilt; Maui Invitational Tournament	W 71–63	1–0	Lahaina Civic Center; Lahaina, Hawaii
Nov 21, 1995*	No. 20	vs. Michigan State; Maui Invitational Tournament	W 92–70	2–0	Lahaina Civic Center; Lahaina, Hawaii
Nov 22, 1995*	No. 20	vs. No. 3 Villanova; Maui Invitational Tournament	L 75–77	2–1	Lahaina Civic Center; Lahaina, Hawaii
Nov 28, 1995*	No. 17	Richmond	W 83–76	3–1	Dean Smith Center; Chapel Hill, North Carolina
Dec 1, 1995*	No. 17	Tulane	W 89–71	4–1	Charlotte Coliseum; Charlotte, North Carolina
Dec 2, 1995*	No. 17	No. 16 Stanford	W 87–63	5–1	Charlotte Coliseum; Charlotte, North Carolina
Dec 7, 1995*	No. 13	Georgia	W 85–74	6–1	Dean Smith Center; Chapel Hill, North Carolina
Jan 27, 1996	No. 11	No. 9 Wake Forest	W 65–59	15–4 (6–1)	Dean Smith Center; Chapel Hill, North Carolina
Jan 31, 1996	No. 8	Duke	W 73–72	16–4 (7–1)	Dean Smith Center; Chapel Hill, North Carolina
Feb 27, 1996	No. 19	at No. 13 Wake Forest	L 60–84	19–9 (9–6)	LJVM Coliseum; Winston-Salem, North Carolina
Mar 3, 1996	No. 19	at Duke	W 84–78	20–9 (10–6)	Cameron Indoor Stadium; Durham, North Carolina
ACC Tournament
Mar 8, 1996*	No. 20	vs. Clemson; Quarterfinals	L 73–75	20–10	Greensboro Coliseum; Greensboro, North Carolina
NCAA Tournament
Mar 15, 1996*	(6 E) No. 25	vs. (11 E) New Orleans; First round	W 83–62	21–10	Richmond Coliseum; Richmond, Virginia
Mar 17, 1996*	(6 E) No. 25	vs. (3 E) No. 8 Texas Tech; Second round	L 73–92	21–11	Richmond Coliseum; Richmond, Virginia
*Non-conference game. ^{#}Rankings from AP. (#) Tournament seedings in parentheses. E=East. All times are in EST.

=== NCAA basketball tournament ===
- East
  - North Carolina 83, New Orleans 62
  - Texas Tech 92, North Carolina 73

== Team players drafted into the NBA ==
Year	Round	Pick	Player	NBA club
1996	2	37	Jeff McInnis	Denver Nuggets
1997	2	29	Serge Zwikker	Houston Rockets
1998	2	34	Shammond Williams	Chicago Bulls
