= 1995–96 Santa Clara Broncos men's basketball team =

American college basketball season

1995–96 Santa Clara Broncos men's basketball

WCC regular season champions

NCAA tournament, second round
- Conference: West Coast Conference
- Record: 20–9 (10–4 WCC)
- Head coach: Dick Davey (4th season)
- Assistant coaches: Larry Hauser; Steve Seandel
- Home arena: Toso Pavilion

1995–96 West Coast Conference men's basketball standings
	Conf.				Overall
Team	W		L	PCT	W		L	PCT
Santa Clara	10	–	4	.714	20	–	9	.690
Gonzaga	10	–	4	.714	21	–	9	.700
Loyola Marymount	8	–	6	.571	18	–	11	.621
San Francisco	8	–	6	.571	15	–	12	.556
Portland †	7	–	7	.500	19	–	11	.633
San Diego	6	–	8	.429	14	–	14	.500
Saint Mary's	5	–	9	.357	12	–	15	.444
Pepperdine	2	–	12	.143	10	–	18	.357
† Conference tournament winner Rankings from AP poll

The 1995–96 Santa Clara Broncos men's basketball team represented Santa Clara University in the 1995-96 Season. Led by head coach Dick Davey, the Broncos finished with a record of 20–9, and a regular season record of 19–8, placing first in the West Coast Conference. After losing in the first round of the West Coast Conference tournament to Pepperdine, the school received an at-large bid into the NCAA tournament, where they beat Maryland in the first round, before being ousted by Kansas in the Round of 32. Throughout the season, Canadian point guard Steve Nash was a standout performer for the Broncos, winning his second consecutive WCC Player of the Year. Following the season, Nash would enter the NBA draft, being selected 15th overall by the Phoenix Suns. In his NBA career, Nash would play two tenures with the Suns, being named MVP twice, he would also play for the Dallas Mavericks and Los Angeles Lakers.

== Roster ==
1995–96 Santa Clara Broncos men's basketball team
Players
Coaches

Pos.	#	Name	Height	Weight	Year	Previous school	Hometown
G	11	Steve Nash	6 ft 3 in (1.91 m)	175 lb (79 kg)	Sr	St. Michaels	Victoria, BC
G/F	12	Adam Anderson	6 ft 5 in (1.96 m)	—	Sr
G	21	Lloyd Pierce	6 ft 3 in (1.91 m)	—	So	Yerba Buena	San Jose, California
G	24	Marlon Garnett	6 ft 2 in (1.88 m)	185 lb (84 kg)	Jr	Hamilton	Los Angeles, California
F	30	Jason Sedlock	6 ft 7 in (2.01 m)	—	Sr
C	31	Drew Zurek	6 ft 9 in (2.06 m)	—	Jr
C	33	Phil Von Buchwaldt	6 ft 11 in (2.11 m)	—	Sr
F	34	Kevin Dunne	6 ft 6 in (1.98 m)	—	Sr
C	42	Brendan Graves	6 ft 10 in (2.08 m)	—	Sr

Head coach

- Dick Davey (Pacific)

Assistant coach(es)

- Larry Hauser (Chicago State)
- Steve Seandel (San José State)

Legend

- (C) Team captain
- (S) Suspended
- (I) Ineligible
- (W) Walk-on
- Injured
- Current redshirt

== Schedule and results ==
Date time, TV	Rank^{#}	Opponent^{#}	Result	Record	High points	High rebounds	High assists	Site city, state
Regular season
Nov 20, 1995*		vs. No. 4 UCLA; Maui Invitational Tournament	W 78–69	1–0	21 – Garnett	–	–	Lahaina Civic Center; Maui, Hawaii
Nov 21, 1995*		vs. No. 3 Villanova; Maui Invitational Tournament	L 65–77	1–1	–	–	–	Lahaina Civic Center; Maui, Hawaii
Nov 22, 1995*		vs. Michigan State; Maui Invitational Tournament	W 77–71	2–1	23 – Nash	–	–	Lahaina Civic Center; Maui, Hawaii
Nov 25, 1995*		vs. Oregon State	W 50–45	3–1	–	–	–	Rose Garden; Portland, Oregon
Dec 1, 1995*		vs. San Jose State	W 79–51	4–1	–	–	–	San Jose Arena; San Jose, California
Dec 9, 1995*	No. 25	Southern	W 98–53	5–1	–	–	15 – Nash	Toso Pavilion; Santa Clara, California
Dec 12, 1995*	No. 22	Fresno State	W 66–58	6–1	–	–	–	Toso Pavilion (4,826); Santa Clara, California
Dec 16, 1995*	No. 22	at Marquette	L 49–78	6–2	11 – Tied	–	–	Bradley Center; Milwaukee, Wisconsin
Dec 18, 1995*		at Illinois State	W 80–78	7–2	–	–	–	Redbird Arena (7,883); Normal, Illinois
Dec 22, 1995*		Pacific	W 75–70	8–2	–	–	–	Toso Pavilion; Santa Clara, California
Dec 29, 1995*		vs. Penn State; Cable Car Classic	L 49–70	8–3	–	–	–	San Jose Arena; San Jose, California
Dec 30, 1995*		vs. Georgia Tech; Cable Car Classic	W 71–66	9–3	–	–	–	San Jose Arena; San Jose, California
Jan 12, 1996		Gonzaga	W 72–61	10–3 (1–0)	–	–	–	Toso Pavilion; Santa Clara, California
Jan 13, 1996		Portland	W 86–66	11–3 (2–0)	–	–	–	Toso Pavilion; Santa Clara, California
Jan 19, 1996		at Loyola Marymount	L 62–71	11–4 (2–1)	–	–	–	Gersten Pavilion; Los Angeles, California
Jan 20, 1996		at Pepperdine	W 87–76	12–4 (3–1)	–	–	–	Firestone Fieldhouse; Malibu, California
Jan 26, 1996		Pepperdine	L 69–72	12–5 (3–2)	–	–	–	Toso Pavilion; Santa Clara, California
Jan 27, 1996		Loyola Marymount	W 78–60	13–5 (4–2)	–	–	–	Toso Pavilion; Santa Clara, California
Feb 1, 1996		at San Francisco	W 70–57	14–5 (5–2)	–	–	–	War Memorial Gymnasium; San Francisco, California
Feb 3, 1996		at San Diego	L 63–74	14–6 (5–3)	–	–	–	USD Sports Center; San Diego, California
Feb 9, 1996		San Diego	W 72–52	15–6 (6–3)	–	–	–	Toso Pavilion; Santa Clara, California
Feb 10, 1996		San Francisco	W 65–41	16–6 (7–3)	–	–	–	Toso Pavilion; Santa Clara, California
Feb 14, 1996		at Saint Mary's	W 79–65	17–6 (8–3)	–	–	–	McKeon Pavilion; Moraga, California
Feb 18, 1996		Saint Mary's	W 64–61	18–6 (9–3)	–	–	–	Toso Pavilion; Santa Clara, California
Feb 14, 1996		at Portland	L 71–80	18–7 (9–4)	–	–	–	Chiles Center; Portland, Oregon
Feb 24, 1996		at Gonzaga	W 77–71	19–7 (10–4)	–	–	–	The Kennel; Spokane, Washington
WCC Tournament
Mar 2, 1996*	(1)	(8) Pepperdine; Quarterfinals	L 60–63	19–8	25 – Nash	–	–	Toso Pavilion; Santa Clara, California
NCAA Tournament
Mar 15, 1996*	(10 W)	vs. (7 W) Maryland; First Round	W 91–79	20–8	28 – Nash	9 – Dunne	12 – Nash	ASU Activity Center; Tempe, Arizona
Mar 17, 1996*	(10 W)	vs. (2 W) No. 4 Kansas; Second Round	L 51–76	20–9	10 – Dunne	8 – Tied	6 – Nash	ASU Activity Center; Tempe, Arizona
*Non-conference game. ^{#}Rankings from AP Poll. (#) Tournament seedings in parentheses. W=West. All times are in Pacific Time.

== Awards and honors ==
- Steve Nash – WCC Player of the Year

== Team players in the 1996 NBA draft ==
Round	Pick	Player	NBA Club
1	15	Steve Nash	Phoenix Suns
