= 1995–96 NCAA Division I men's basketball rankings =

- Season: 1995–96
- NCAA Tournament: 1996
- Preseason No. 1: Kentucky
- NCAA Tournament Champions: Kentucky
NCAA Division I men's basketball rankings


The 1995–96 NCAA Division I men's basketball rankings was made up of two human polls, the AP Poll and the Coaches Poll, in addition to various other preseason polls.

== Legend ==
	Increase in ranking
	Decrease in ranking
	New to rankings from previous week
Italics	Number of first place votes
(#–#)	Win–loss record
т	Tied with team above or below also with this symbol

== AP Poll ==
	Preseason	Week 2 Nov. 20	Week 3 Nov. 27	Week 4 Dec. 4	Week 5 Dec. 11	Week 6 Dec. 18	Week 7 Dec. 25	Week 8 Jan. 2	Week 9 Jan. 8	Week 10 Jan. 15	Week 11 Jan. 22	Week 12 Jan. 29	Week 13 Feb. 5	Week 14 Feb. 12	Week 15 Feb. 19	Week 16 Feb. 26	Week 17 Mar. 5	Final Mar. 12	
1.	Kentucky	Kentucky (0–0)	Kentucky (1–0)	Kansas (3–0)	Kansas (5–0)	Kansas (6–0)	UMass (7–0)	UMass (10–0)	UMass (12–0)	UMass (14–0)	UMass (16–0)	UMass (18–0)	UMass (21–0)	UMass (23–0)	UMass (25–0)	Kentucky (24–1)	Kentucky (26–1)	UMass (31–1)	1.
2.	Kansas	Kansas (0–0)	Kansas (1–0)	Villanova (5–0)	Villanova (7–0)	UMass (6–0)	Kentucky (7–1)	Kentucky (9–1)	Kentucky (11–1)	Kentucky (13–1)	Kentucky (15–1)	Kentucky (17–1)	Kentucky (18–1)	Kentucky (20–1)	Kentucky (22–1)	UMass (26–1)	UMass (28–1)	Kentucky (28–2)	2.
3.	Villanova	Villanova (0–0)	Villanova (3–0)	UMass (3–0)	UMass (5–0)	Arizona (8–0)	Memphis (7–0)	Memphis (8–0)	Kansas (10–1)	Cincinnati (11–0)	Kansas (14–1)	Kansas (16–1)	Kansas (18–1)	Connecticut (22–1)	Connecticut (24–1)	Kansas (23–2)	Connecticut (27–2)	Connecticut (30–2)	3.
4.	UCLA	UCLA (0–0)	Arizona (4–0)	Arizona (5–0)	Arizona (7–0)	Kentucky (5–1)	Kansas (7–1)	Kansas (7–1)	Cincinnati (9–0)	Kansas (12–1)	Connecticut (16–1)	Connecticut (19–1)	Connecticut (21–1)	Villanova (20–3)	Villanova (23–3)	Connecticut (25–2)	Purdue (25–4)	Purdue (26–4) т	4.
5.	Georgetown	Georgetown (2–0)	UMass (0–0)	Kentucky (2–1)	Kentucky (4–1)	Memphis (5–0)	Cincinnati (7–0)	Cincinnati (8–0)	Georgetown (13–1)	Connecticut (14–1)	Cincinnati (12–1)	Cincinnati (14–1)	Cincinnati (17–1)	Kansas (19–2)	Kansas (21–2)	Purdue (23–4)	Kansas (24–3)	Georgetown (26–7) т	5.
6.	Connecticut	Connecticut (0–0)	Georgetown (3–1)	Georgetown (5–1)	Memphis (4–0)	Georgetown (7–1)	Georgetown (9–1)	Georgetown (11–1)	Connecticut (12–1)	Wake Forest (10–1)	Georgetown (16–2)	Villanova (16–3)	Villanova (18–3)	Cincinnati (18–2)	Cincinnati (19–2)	Villanova (23–4)	Georgetown (24–6)	Kansas (25–5) т	6.
7.	UMass	UMass (0–0)	Memphis (1–0)	Memphis (3–0)	Georgetown (7–1)	Villanova (7–1)	Connecticut (8–1)	Connecticut (10–1)	Villanova (12–1)	Villanova (13–2)	Villanova (14–3)	Utah (16–3)	Utah (18–3)	Utah (19–3)	Purdue (21–4)	Cincinnati (21–3)	Texas Tech (25–1)	Cincinnati (25–4)	7.
8.	Iowa	Utah (0–0)	Mississippi State (1–0)	Mississippi State (3–0)	Connecticut (6–1)	Connecticut (7–1)	Villanova (8–1)	Villanova (10–1)	Wake Forest (8–1)	Georgetown (14–2)	Virginia Tech (11–1)	North Carolina (15–4)	Georgetown (19–3)	Wake Forest (16–3)	Utah (21–4)	Georgetown (23–5)	Cincinnati (22–4)	Texas Tech (28–1)	8.
9.	Mississippi State	Mississippi State (0–0)	Connecticut (2–1)	Connecticut (4–1)	Iowa (7–1)	Cincinnati (6–0)	Arizona (8–1)	Arizona (10–1)	Memphis (8–2)	Memphis (11–2)	Wake Forest (12–2)	Georgetown (17–3)	Wake Forest (14–3)	Penn State (18–2)	Texas Tech (22–1)	Texas Tech (24–1)	Villanova (24–5)	Wake Forest (26–6)	9.
10.	Utah	Iowa (0–0)	Wake Forest (1–0)	Wake Forest (3–0)	North Carolina (6–1)	Iowa (8–1)	Iowa (10–1)	Iowa (11–1)	North Carolina (11–2)	North Carolina (12–3)	Utah (14–3)	Penn State (15–1)	Penn State (16–2)	Virginia Tech (18–2)	Wake Forest (17–4)	Utah (22–5)	Utah (23–5)	Villanova (25–6)	10.
11.	Wake Forest	Wake Forest (0–0)	Iowa (2–1)	Missouri (4–0)	Wake Forest (4–1)	North Carolina (7–1)	North Carolina (8–1)	Syracuse (11–1)	Iowa (12–2)	Virginia Tech (9–1)	North Carolina (13–4)	Memphis (14–3)	Virginia Tech (16–2)	Purdue (19–4)	Georgetown (21–5)	Arizona (21–5)	Arizona (23–5)	Arizona (24–6)	11.
12.	Louisville	Memphis (0–0)	Duke (3–0)	Iowa (5–1)	Cincinnati (4–0)	Wake Forest (4–1)	Illinois (9–0)	Wake Forest (6–1)	Mississippi State (10–1)	Syracuse (13–2)	Memphis (12–3)	Wake Forest (13–3)	North Carolina (16–5)	Texas Tech (20–1)	Virginia Tech (19–3)	Penn State (19–4)	Wake Forest (20–5)	Utah (25–6)	12.
13.	Memphis	Louisville (0–0)	Missouri (1–0)	North Carolina (5–1)	Utah (5–1)	Utah (6–1)	Syracuse (9–0)	Illinois (11–1)	Utah (9–2)	UCLA (11–3)	Arizona (13–3)	Virginia Tech (13–2)	Texas Tech (18–1)	Arizona (18–4)	Arizona (19–5)	Wake Forest (18–5)	Syracuse (22–7)	Georgia Tech (22–11)	13.
14.	Missouri	Maryland (0–0)	Utah (0–1)	Utah (2–1)	Missouri (5–1)	Illinois (7–0)	Wake Forest (6–1)	Georgia (9–1)	Syracuse (11–2)	Penn State (13–0)	Penn State (13–1)	Arizona (15–3)	Purdue (17–4)	Georgetown (19–5)	Penn State (18–4)	Memphis (20–5)	Memphis (21–6)	UCLA (23–7)	14.
15.	Maryland	Missouri (0–0)	Virginia (1–0)	Virginia (2–1)	Mississippi State (4–1)	Missouri (6–1)	Utah (7–2)	Utah (8–2)	Virginia Tech (7–1)	Utah (11–3)	UCLA (12–4)	Texas Tech (16–1)	Memphis (16–4)	Memphis (17–4)	Syracuse (19–6)	Syracuse (20–7)	Virginia Tech (22–4)	Syracuse (24–8)	15.
16.	Arkansas	Michigan (2–0)	Stanford (2–0)	Georgia Tech (5–1)	Illinois (6–0)	Mississippi State (5–1)	Georgia (8–1)	North Carolina (9–2)	Clemson (10–0)	Iowa (13–3)	Michigan (14–4)	Iowa (15–4)	Arizona (16–4)	Syracuse (18–6)	UCLA (18–6)	Virginia Tech (20–4)	Penn State (20–5)	Memphis (22–7)	16.
17.	Michigan	Virginia (0–0)	North Carolina (2–1)	Cincinnati (1–0)	Virginia Tech (3–0)	Michigan (8–2)	Mississippi State (6–1)	Mississippi State (8–1)	UCLA (9–3)	Purdue (13–2)	Syracuse (13–4)	Purdue (15–4)	UCLA (15–5)	North Carolina (16–7)	North Carolina (18–7)	UCLA (19–7)	UCLA (21–7)	Iowa State (23–8)	17.
18.	Stanford	Stanford (0–0)	Louisville (2–1)	Duke (4–1)	Michigan (7–2)	Georgia (6–1)	Missouri (7–2)	Virginia Tech (6–1)	Arizona (10–3)	Arizona (11–3)	Clemson (12–2)	Syracuse (14–5)	Syracuse (16–6)	UCLA (16–6)	Iowa (18–6)	Georgia Tech (18–10)	Georgia Tech (20–10)	Penn State (21–6)	18.
19.	Virginia	Arizona (2–0)	Maryland (0–1)	Virginia Tech (2–0)	Georgia Tech (5–2)	Syracuse (8–0)	Michigan (9–2)	Duke (9–2)	Georgia (10–2)	Clemson (11–1)	Purdue (14–3)	UCLA (13–5)	Iowa (15–6)	Iowa (17–6)	Memphis (17–5)	North Carolina (19–8)	Iowa (21–7)	Mississippi State (22–7)	19.
20.	North Carolina	North Carolina (0–0)	Georgia Tech (3–1)	Maryland (2–2)	Louisville (5–2)	Duke (5–2)	Duke (7–2)	UCLA (7–3)	Penn State (11–0)	Michigan (13–4)	Boston College (12–3)	Michigan (14–6)	Louisville (16–6)	Stanford (15–5)	Boston College (16–6)	Iowa (19–7)	North Carolina (20–9)	Marquette (22–7)	20.
21.	Cincinnati	Cincinnati (0–0)	Cincinnati (0–0)	Illinois (3–0)	Duke (5–2)	Georgia Tech (6–3)	Virginia Tech (4–1)	Michigan (10–3)	Illinois (11–3)	Mississippi State (10–3)	Auburn (15–3)	Boston College (12–4)	Iowa State (16–4)	Boston College (15–5)	Louisville (18–7)	Louisville (19–8)	Marquette (20–6)	Iowa (22–8)	21.
22.	Virginia Tech	Virginia Tech (0–0)	Virginia Tech (0–0)	Michigan (5–2)	Santa Clara (5–1)	Virginia Tech (3–1)	Virginia (4–2)	Clemson (9–0)	Purdue (11–2)	Georgia (10–3)	Iowa (14–4)	Auburn (15–4)	Boston College (13–5)	Iowa State (17–5)	Iowa State (18–6)	Wisconsin-Green Bay (24–2)	Louisville (19–10)	Virginia Tech (22–5)	22.
23.	Indiana	Indiana (0–0)	UCLA (1–2)	Louisville (3–2)	Virginia (3–2)	Virginia (3–2)	UCLA (6–3)	Texas (7–2)	Michigan (11–4)	Auburn (14–3)	Texas Tech (14–1)	Eastern Michigan (15–1)	Michigan (15–7)	Eastern Michigan (18–2)	Georgia Tech (16–10)	Iowa State (19–7)	Iowa State (20–8)	New Mexico (28–5)	23.
24.	Purdue	Purdue (0–0)	Michigan (2–2)	Stanford (3–2)	UCLA (3–3)	California (4–0)	Clemson (8–0)	Boston College (8–2)	Stanford (8–2)	Boston College (11–3)	Marquette (12–3)	Clemson (12–4)	Eastern Michigan (16–2)	Louisville (17–7)	Stanford (16–6)	George Washington (18–5)	Wisconsin-Green Bay (25–3)	Louisville (20–11)	24.
25.	California	Georgia Tech (2–0)	Arkansas (1–1)	Santa Clara (4–1)	Syracuse (6–0)	Louisville (6–3)	Tulsa (5–0)	New Mexico (10–0)	New Mexico (11–1)	Texas Tech (12–1)	California (10–4)	Georgia Tech (13–8)	Stanford (13–5)	Mississippi State (16–5)	Wisconsin-Green Bay (21–2)	Stanford (17–7)	Mississippi State (19–7)	North Carolina (20–10)	25.
	Preseason	Week 2 Nov. 20	Week 3 Nov. 27	Week 4 Dec. 4	Week 5 Dec. 11	Week 6 Dec. 18	Week 7 Dec. 25	Week 8 Jan. 2	Week 9 Jan. 8	Week 10 Jan. 15	Week 11 Jan. 22	Week 12 Jan. 29	Week 13 Feb. 5	Week 14 Feb. 12	Week 15 Feb. 19	Week 16 Feb. 26	Week 17 Mar. 5	Final Mar. 12	
		Dropped: Arkansas; California	Dropped: Indiana; Purdue	Dropped: UCLA; Arkansas	Dropped: Maryland; Stanford	Dropped: Santa Clara; UCLA	Dropped: Georgia Tech; California; Louisville	Dropped: Missouri; Virginia; Tulsa	Dropped: Duke (9–4); Texas; Boston College	Dropped: Illinois; Stanford; New Mexico	Dropped: Mississippi State; Georgia	Dropped: Marquette; California	Dropped: Auburn; Clemson; Georgia Tech	Dropped: Michigan	Dropped: Eastern Michigan; Mississippi State	Dropped: Boston College (16–8)	Dropped: George Washington; Stanford (17–8)	Dropped: Wisconsin-Green Bay (25–3)	

== Coaches Poll ==
	Preseason	Week 2 Nov. 20	Week 3 Nov. 27	Week 4 Dec. 4	Week 5 Dec. 11	Week 6 Dec. 18	Week 7 Dec. 26	Week 8 Jan. 2	Week 9 Jan. 8	Week 10 Jan. 15	Week 11 Jan. 22	Week 12 Jan. 29	Week 13 Feb. 5	Week 14 Feb. 12	Week 15 Feb. 19	Week 16 Feb. 26	Week 17 Mar. 5	Week 18 Mar. 12	Final Apr. 2	
1.	Kentucky	Kentucky (0–0)	Kentucky (1–0)	Kansas (3–0)	Kansas (5–0)	Kansas (6–0)	UMass (7–0)	UMass (10–0)	UMass (12–0)	UMass (14–0)	UMass (16–0)	UMass (18–0)	UMass (21–0)	UMass (23–0)	UMass (25–0)	Kentucky (24–1)	Kentucky (26–1)	UMass (31–1)	Kentucky (34–2)	1.
2.	Kansas	Kansas (0–0)	Kansas (1–0)	Villanova (5–0)	Villanova (7–0)	UMass (6–0)	Kentucky (7–1)	Kentucky (9–1)	Kentucky (11–1)	Kentucky (13–1)	Kentucky (15–1)	Kentucky (17–1)	Kentucky (18–1)	Kentucky (20–1)	Kentucky (22–1)	UMass (26–1)	UMass (28–1)	Kentucky (28–2)	UMass (35–2)	2.
3.	UCLA	Villanova (0–0)	Villanova (3–0)	UMass (3–0)	UMass (5–0)	Arizona (8–0)	Kansas (7–1)	Kansas (7–1)	Kansas (10–1)	Kansas (12–1)	Cincinnati (12–1)	Kansas (16–1)	Kansas (18–1)	Connecticut (22–1)	Connecticut (24–1)	Kansas (23–2)	Connecticut (27–2)	Connecticut (30–2)	Syracuse (29–9)	3.
4.	Villanova	Georgetown (2–0)	Arizona (4–0)	Arizona (5–0)	Arizona (7–0)	Kentucky (5–1)	Georgetown (9–1) т	Cincinnati (8–0)	Cincinnati (9–0)	Cincinnati (11–0)	Kansas (14–1)	Connecticut (19–1)	Connecticut (21–1)	Cincinnati (18–2)	Kansas (21–2)	Connecticut (25–2)	Purdue (25–4)	Purdue (26–4)	Mississippi State (26–8)	4.
5.	Georgetown	UCLA (0–0)	Georgetown (3–1)	Kentucky (2–1)	Kentucky (4–1)	Georgetown (7–1)	Connecticut (8–1) т	Memphis (8–0)	Georgetown (13–1)	Connecticut (14–1)	Connecticut (16–1)	Cincinnati (14–1)	Cincinnati (17–1)	Kansas (19–2)	Villanova (23–3)	Purdue (23–4)	Kansas (24–3)	Georgetown (26–7)	Kansas (29–5)	5.
6.	Connecticut	Connecticut (0–0)	UMass (0–0)	Georgetown (5–1)	Georgetown (7–1)	Connecticut (7–1)	Cincinnati (7–0)	Connecticut (10–1)	Connecticut (12–1)	Wake Forest (10–1)	Georgetown (16–2)	Villanova (16–3)	Villanova (18–3)	Villanova (20–3)	Cincinnati (19–2)	Cincinnati (21–3)	Georgetown (24–6)	Cincinnati (25–4)	Cincinnati (28–5)	6.
7.	UMass	UMass (0–0)	Wake Forest (1–0)	Mississippi State (3–0)	Connecticut (6–1)	Villanova (7–1)	Memphis (7–0)	Georgetown (11–1)	Villanova (12–1)	Georgetown (14–2)	Villanova (14–3)	Utah (16–3)	Utah (18–3)	Utah (19–3)	Purdue (21–4)	Villanova (23–4)	Texas Tech (25–1)	Texas Tech (28–1)	Georgetown (29–8)	7.
8.	Wake Forest	Wake Forest (0–0)	Mississippi State (1–0)	Wake Forest (3–0)	Memphis (4–0)	Memphis (5–0)	Arizona (8–1)	Villanova (10–1)	Wake Forest (8–1)	Villanova (13–2)	Wake Forest (12–2)	North Carolina (15–4)	Georgetown (19–3)	Penn State (18–2)	Utah (21–4)	Texas Tech (24–1)	Utah (23–5)	Kansas (25–5)	Connecticut (32–3)	8.
9.	Louisville	Arizona (2–0)	Connecticut (2–1)	Memphis (3–0)	Iowa (7–1)	Cincinnati (6–0)	Villanova (8–1)	Arizona (10–1)	North Carolina (11–2)	North Carolina (12–3)	Utah (14–3)	Georgetown (17–3)	Wake Forest (14–3)	Wake Forest (16–3)	Texas Tech (22–1)	Georgetown (23–5)	Cincinnati (22–4)	Wake Forest (23–5)	Wake Forest (26–6)	9.
10.	Iowa	Utah (0–0)	Memphis (1–0)	Iowa (5–1)	Cincinnati (4–0)	Iowa (8–1)	Iowa (10–1)	Iowa (11–1)	Utah (9–2)	Memphis (11–2)	Virginia Tech (11–1)	Wake Forest (13–3)	Penn State (16–2)	Virginia Tech (18–2)	Wake Forest (17–4)	Utah (22–5)	Wake Forest (20–5)	Utah (25–6)	Texas Tech (30–2)	10.
11.	Utah	Iowa (0–0)	Iowa (2–1)	Connecticut (4–1)	Wake Forest (4–1)	North Carolina (7–1)	North Carolina (8–1)	Wake Forest (6–1)	Iowa (12–2)	Utah (11–3)	North Carolina (13–4)	Penn State (15–1)	North Carolina (16–5)	Purdue (19–4)	Georgetown (21–5)	Arizona (21–5)	Arizona (23–5)	Arizona (24–6)	Arizona (26–7)	11.
12.	Mississippi State	Mississippi State (0–0)	Duke (3–0)	Missouri (4–0)	North Carolina (6–1)	Wake Forest (4–1)	Illinois (9–0)	Syracuse (11–1)	Mississippi State (10–1)	Syracuse (13–2)	Arizona (13–3)	Arizona (15–3)	Virginia Tech (16–2)	Texas Tech (20–1)	Penn State (18–4)	Wake Forest (18–5)	Villanova (24–5)	Villanova (25–6)	Utah (27–7)	12.
13.	Memphis	Michigan (2–0)	Louisville (2–1)	North Carolina (5–1)	Missouri (5–1)	Missouri (6–1)	Wake Forest (6–1)	North Carolina (9–2)	Memphis (8–2)	Virginia Tech (9–1)	Syracuse (13–4)	Memphis (14–3)	Purdue (17–4)	Georgetown (19–5)	Virginia Tech (19–3)	Penn State (19–4)	Syracuse (22–7)	UCLA (23–7)	Georgia Tech (24–12)	13.
14.	Virginia	Maryland (0–0)	Missouri (1–0)	Utah (2–1)	Utah (5–1)	Utah (6–1)	Syracuse (9–0)	Georgia (9–1)	Syracuse (11–2)	Penn State (13–0)	Penn State (13–1)	Virginia Tech (13–2)	Texas Tech (18–1)	Memphis (17–4)	Arizona (19–5)	Syracuse (20–7)	Memphis (21–6)	Syracuse (24–8)	Louisville (22–12)	14.
15.	Missouri	Memphis (0–0)	Stanford (2–0)	Georgia Tech (5–1)	Mississippi State (4–1)	Illinois (7–0)	Mississippi State (6–1)	Illinois (11–1)	Virginia Tech (7–1)	UCLA (11–3)	Memphis (12–3)	Purdue (15–4)	Arizona (16–4)	Arizona (18–4)	UCLA (18–6)	Memphis (20–5)	UCLA (21–7)	Georgia Tech (22–11)	Purdue (26–6)	15.
16.	Michigan т	Louisville (0–0)	Maryland (0–1)	Virginia (2–1)	Michigan (7–2)	Mississippi State (5–1)	Utah (7–2) т	Utah (8–2)	Arizona (10–3)	Iowa (13–3)	Michigan (14–4)	Syracuse (14–5)	Memphis (16–4)	Syracuse (18–6)	Syracuse (19–6)	Virginia Tech (20–4)	Virginia Tech (22–4)	Iowa State (23–8)	Georgia (21–10)	16.
17.	Stanford т	Missouri (0–0)	Utah (0–1)	Cincinnati (1–0)	Virginia Tech (3–0)	Michigan (8–2)	Georgia (8–1) т	Mississippi State (8–1)	Georgia (10–2)	Arizona (11–3)	UCLA (12–4)	Iowa (15–4)	UCLA (15–5)	North Carolina (16–7)	North Carolina (18–7)	UCLA (19–7)	Penn State (20–5)	Memphis (22–7)	Villanova (26–7)	17.
18.	Arkansas	Stanford (0–0)	North Carolina (2–1)	Duke (4–1)	Illinois (6–0)	Georgia Tech (6–3)	Missouri (7–2)	Virginia Tech (6–1)	Michigan (11–4)	Purdue (13–2)	Iowa (14–4)	Michigan (14–6)	Syracuse (16–6)	UCLA (16–6)	Memphis (17–5)	Louisville (19–8)	Georgia Tech (20–10)	Penn State (21–6)	Arkansas (20–13)	18.
19.	Maryland	Virginia (0–0)	Virginia (1–0)	Maryland (2–2)	Louisville (5–2)	Georgia (6–1)	Michigan (9–2)	Michigan (10–3)	UCLA (9–3)	Michigan (13–4)	Purdue (14–3)	UCLA (13–5)	Michigan (15–7)	Iowa (17–6)	Iowa (18–6)	North Carolina (19–8)	Iowa (21–7)	Iowa (22–8)	UCLA (23–8)	19.
20.	Cincinnati	Georgia Tech (2–0)	Georgia Tech (3–1)	Virginia Tech (2–0)	Georgia Tech (5–2)	Duke (5–2)	Duke (7–2)	Duke (9–2)	Clemson (10–0)	Clemson (11–1)	Clemson (12–2)	Texas Tech (16–1)	Iowa (15–6)	Stanford (15–5)	Boston College (16–6)	Georgia Tech (18–10)	North Carolina (20–9)	Mississippi State (22–7)	Iowa State (24–9)	20.
21.	North Carolina	Cincinnati (0–0)	Cincinnati (0–0)	Michigan (5–2) т	Virginia (3–2)	Virginia (3–2)	Virginia (4–2)	UCLA (7–3)	Illinois (11–3)	Mississippi State (10–3)	Boston College (12–3)	Clemson (12–4)	Boston College (13–5)	Boston College (15–5)	Eastern Michigan (19–3)	Iowa (19–7)	Louisville (19–10)	Virginia Tech (22–5)	Virginia Tech (23–6)	21.
22.	Virginia Tech	North Carolina (0–0)	UCLA (1–2)	Louisville (3–2) т	Duke (5–2)	Syracuse (8–0) т	Virginia Tech (4–1)	Virginia (5–3)	Penn State (11–0)	Georgia (10–3)	Auburn (15–3)	Auburn (15–4)	Auburn (15–6)	Eastern Michigan (18–2)	Georgia Tech (16–10)	Wisconsin-Green Bay (24–2)	Iowa State (20–8)	Marquette (22–7)	Iowa (23–9)	22.
23.	Purdue	Virginia Tech (0–0)	Virginia Tech (0–0)	Stanford (3–2)	Santa Clara (5–1)	Louisville (6–3) т	Georgia Tech (6–5)	Missouri (8–4)	Duke (9–4)	Auburn (14–3)	Texas Tech (14–1)	Boston College (12–4)	Eastern Michigan (16–2)	Louisville (17–7)	Stanford (16–6)	Iowa State (19–7)	Wisconsin-Green Bay (25–3)	Louisville (20–11)	Marquette (23–8)	23.
24.	Indiana	Indiana (0–0)	Michigan (2–2)	Illinois (3–0)	Maryland (3–3)	Virginia Tech (3–1)	Maryland (5–3)	Clemson (9–0)	Stanford (8–2)	Stanford (8–4)	Georgia (11–4)	Stanford (11–6)	Stanford (13–5)	Iowa State (17–5)	Iowa State (18–6)	Stanford (17–7)	Stanford (17–8)	North Carolina (20–10)	North Carolina (21–11)	24.
25.	Arizona	Purdue (0–0)	Tulane (0–1)	Santa Clara (4–1)	UCLA (3–3)	Maryland (4–3)	Louisville (7–4)	Penn State (9–0)	Purdue (11–2)	Illinois (11–5)	Stanford (10–4)	Georgia Tech (13–8)	Louisville (16–6)	Michigan (15–8)	Louisville (18–7)	Boston College (16–8)	Marquette (20–6)	Stanford (19–8)	New Mexico (28–5)	25.
	Preseason	Week 2 Nov. 20	Week 3 Nov. 27	Week 4 Dec. 4	Week 5 Dec. 11	Week 6 Dec. 18	Week 7 Dec. 26	Week 8 Jan. 2	Week 9 Jan. 8	Week 10 Jan. 15	Week 11 Jan. 22	Week 12 Jan. 29	Week 13 Feb. 5	Week 14 Feb. 12	Week 15 Feb. 19	Week 16 Feb. 26	Week 17 Mar. 5	Week 18 Mar. 12	Final Apr. 2	
		Dropped: Arkansas	Dropped: Indiana; Purdue	Dropped: UCLA; Tulane	Dropped: Stanford	Dropped: Santa Clara; UCLA	None	Dropped: Georgia Tech; Louisville; Maryland	Dropped: Virginia; Missouri	Dropped: Duke	Dropped: Mississippi State; Illinois	Dropped: Georgia	Dropped: Clemson; Georgia Tech	Dropped: Auburn	Dropped: Michigan	Dropped: Eastern Michigan	Dropped: Boston College	Dropped: Wisconsin-Green Bay	Dropped: Memphis (22–8); Penn State (21–8); Stanford (19–8)	
