= University Hall (University of Virginia) =

Arena in Charlottesville, Virginia, US

Coordinates: 38°2′40.60″N 78°30′32.26″W

- U-Hall; Ralph's House
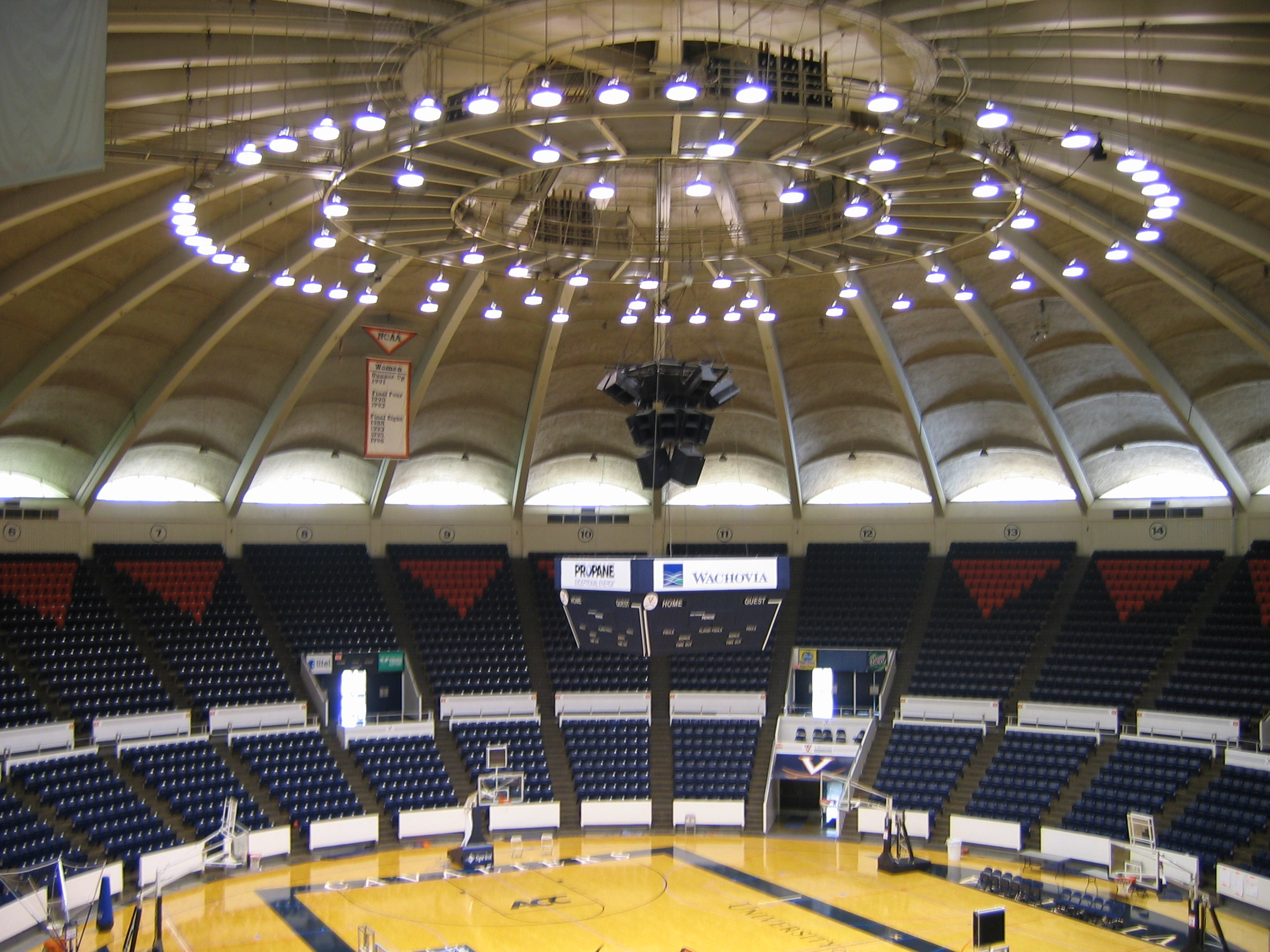
- Interactive map of University Hall
- Location: Massie Rd; Charlottesville, VA 22904
- Owner: University of Virginia
- Operator: University of Virginia
- Capacity: Official: 8,457; Record: 11,174

Construction
- Opened: November 3, 1965
- Closed: 2006
- Demolished: May 25, 2019

Tenant
- Virginia Cavaliers

University Hall was an 8,457-seat multi-purpose arena on the University of Virginia Grounds in Charlottesville, Virginia. The arena opened in 1965 as a replacement for Memorial Gym; it was demolished on May 25, 2019, with Ralph Sampson leading the demolition. Like many arenas built at the time, the arena was circular, with a ribbed concrete roof and blue and orange seats (the orange seats arranged in a "V" near the top of each section) that surrounded the arena. Unlike many other facilities, however, the floor was never lowered for additional seating around the court, which left large areas behind press row, the team benches, and the announcer's table empty during games.

University Hall was replaced by the John Paul Jones Arena as the home to the men's and women's basketball teams in 2006.

UVa's athletic department held "final game" ceremonies for University Hall in connection with the men's basketball game against the Maryland Terrapins on March 5, 2006. UVA legend Ralph Sampson sank ceremonial "last baskets" at U-Hall, dunking twice during postgame festivities.

However, the women's basketball team made the Women's National Invitational Tournament and played and won two WNIT games in University Hall.

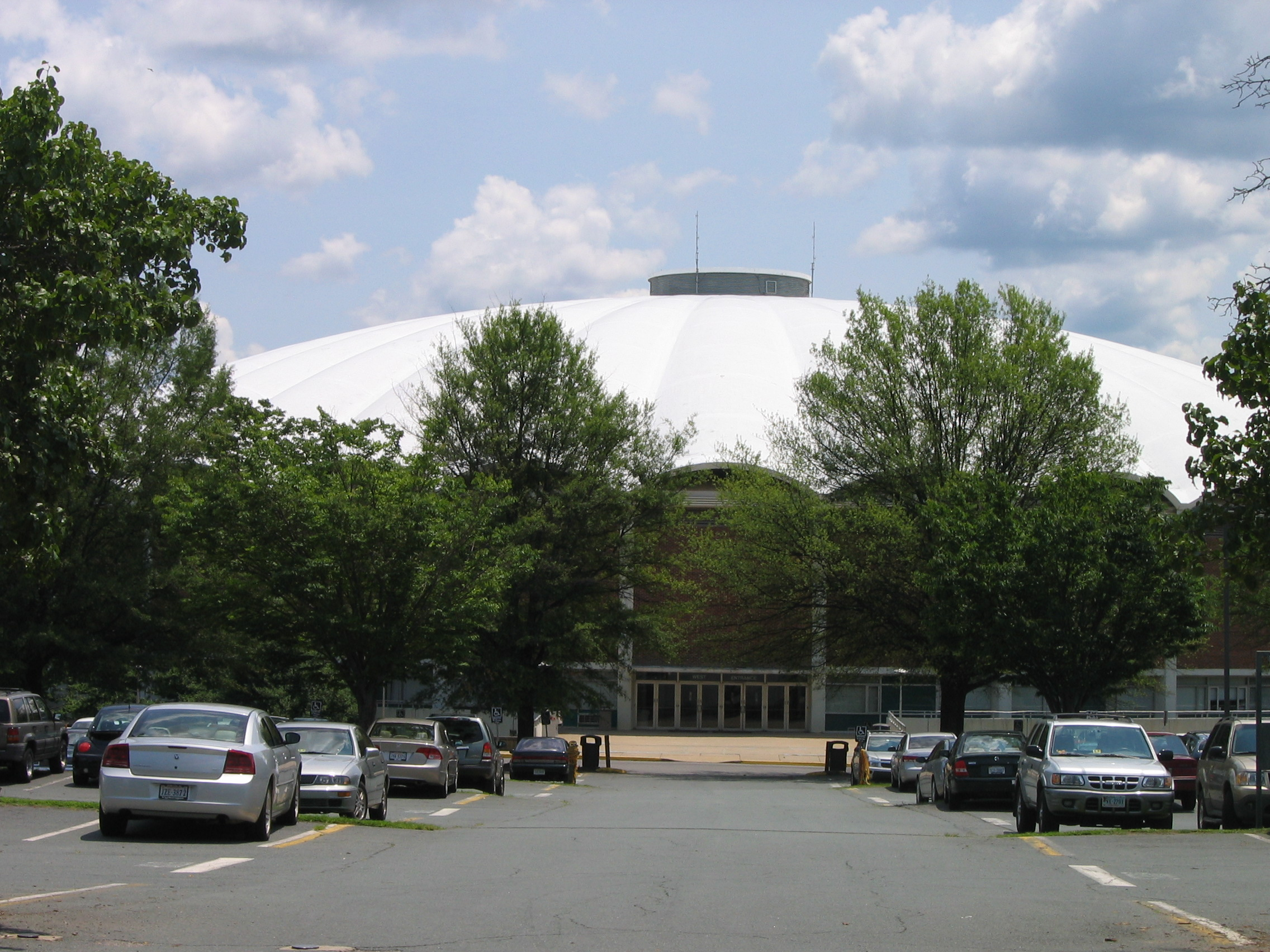
2006

== Records ==
University Hall Records
Scoring
| Virginia | | | | | Opponents |
| | Player | Opponent | Date | Points | | Player | Opponent | Date | Points |
|---|---|---|---|---|---|---|---|---|---|
| 1. | Barry Parkhill | vs. Baldwin-Wallace | December 11, 1971 | 51 | 1. | Kevin Braswell | Georgetown | March 15, 2000 | 40 † |
| 2. | Donald Hand | vs. N.C. State | February 14, 1999 | 41 | 2. | Tate Armstrong | Duke | February 11, 1976 | 38 |
| 3. | Ralph Sampson | vs. Ohio State | January 25, 1981 | 40 | – | Calvin Natt | N.E. Louisiana | March 7, 1979 | 38 † |
| 4. | Richard Morgan | vs. North Carolina | January 15, 1989 | 39 | 4. | Sam Perkins | North Carolina | January 15, 1983 | 36 |
| 5. | Cory Alexander | vs. George Mason | January 28, 1995 | 36 | 5. | Mike Pegues | Delaware | December 27, 1998 | 35 |
Rebounding
| Virginia | | | | | Opponents |
| | Player | Opponent | Date | Rebounds | | Player | Opponent | Date | Rebounds |
| 1. | Norm Carmichael | vs. Richmond | January 3, 1968 | 22 | 1. | Bill Jews | Johns Hopkins | January 26, 1972 | 23 |
| – | John Gidding | vs. George Washington | December 7, 1968 | 22 | – | Tim Duncan | Wake Forest | February 22, 1997 | 23 |
| 3. | Bill Gerry | vs. Maryland | February 11, 1970 | 20 | 3. | Mike Lewis | Duke | December 18, 1965 | 20 |
| – | Ralph Sampson | vs. Pennsylvania | January 16, 1980 | 20 | – | Antawn Jamison | North Carolina | January 17, 1996 | 20 |
| – | Ralph Sampson | vs. Wake Forest | February 24, 1982 | 20 | 5. | Christian Laettner | Duke | February 8, 1990 | 19 |
| – | Travis Watson | vs. Wofford | January 2, 2003 | 20 |
†NIT game
