= 1996 Big Eight Conference men's basketball tournament =

- Classification: Division I
- Season: 1995–96
- Teams: 8
- Finals site: Kemper Arena; Kansas City, MO
- Champions: Iowa State (1st title)
- Winning coach: Tim Floyd (1st title)
- MVP: Dedric Willoughby (Iowa State)

1995–96 Big Eight Conference men's basketball standings
	Conf.				Overall
Team	W		L	PCT	W		L	PCT
No. 4 Kansas	12	–	2	.857	29	–	5	.853
No. 17 Iowa State †	9	–	5	.643	24	–	9	.727
Oklahoma (Note: Adjusted from 17–13 as Purdue forfeited 18 wins)	8	–	6	.571	18	–	12	.600
Kansas State	7	–	7	.500	17	–	12	.586
Oklahoma State	7	–	7	.500	17	–	10	.630
Missouri	6	–	8	.429	18	–	15	.545
Nebraska	4	–	10	.286	21	–	14	.600
Colorado	3	–	11	.214	9	–	18	.333
† 1996 Big Eight tournament winner Rankings from AP Poll

The 1996 Big Eight Conference men's basketball tournament was held March 8–10 at Kemper Arena in Kansas City, Missouri.

Second-seeded Iowa State defeated #1 seed Kansas in the championship game, 56–55, to capture their first Big Eight men's basketball tournament and earn the conference's automatic bid to the 1996 NCAA tournament. This was the final Big Eight men's basketball tournament, as the members of the Big Eight Conference joined Texas, Texas Tech, Baylor, and Texas A&M to play in the inaugural Big 12 men's basketball tournament.

== Bracket ==
Quarterfinals; Friday, March 8
1	#5 Kansas	88
8	Colorado	55
4	Kansas State	58
5	Oklahoma State	55
3	Oklahoma	88
6	Missouri	92
7	Nebraska	60
2	#23 Iowa State	62

Semifinals; Saturday, March 9
1	#5 Kansas	61
4	Kansas State	55
6	Missouri	53
2	#23 Iowa State	57

Championship; Sunday, March 10
1	#5 Kansas	55
2	#23 Iowa State	56
