= 1995–96 Iowa State Cyclones men's basketball team =

American college basketball season

1995–96 Iowa State Cyclones men's basketball
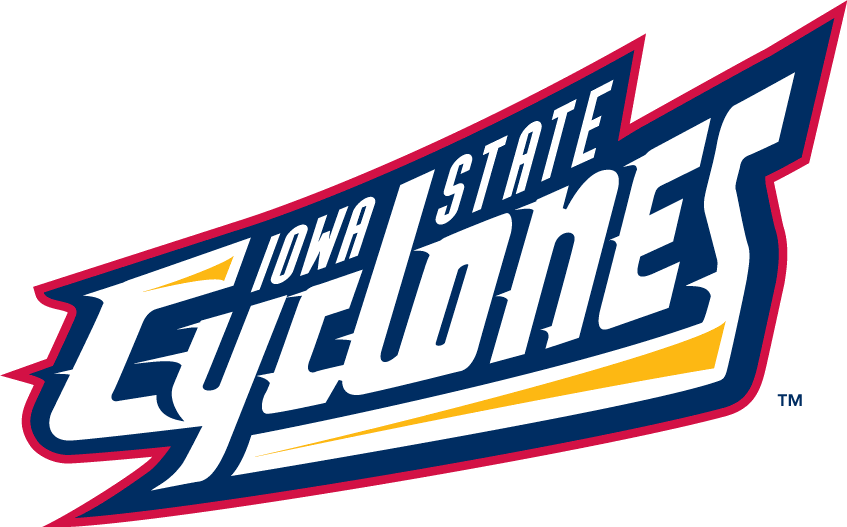

Big Eight tournament champions

1996 NCAA tournament, Round of 32
- Conference: Big Eight Conference

Ranking
- Coaches: No. 20
- AP: No. 17
- Record: 24–9 (9–5 Big Eight)
- Head coach: Tim Floyd (2nd season)
- Assistant coach: James Green (2nd season)
- Home arena: Hilton Coliseum

1995–96 Big Eight Conference men's basketball standings
	Conf.				Overall
Team	W		L	PCT	W		L	PCT
No. 4 Kansas	12	–	2	.857	29	–	5	.853
No. 17 Iowa State †	9	–	5	.643	24	–	9	.727
Oklahoma (Note: Adjusted from 17–13 as Purdue forfeited 18 wins)	8	–	6	.571	18	–	12	.600
Kansas State	7	–	7	.500	17	–	12	.586
Oklahoma State	7	–	7	.500	17	–	10	.630
Missouri	6	–	8	.429	18	–	15	.545
Nebraska	4	–	10	.286	21	–	14	.600
Colorado	3	–	11	.214	9	–	18	.333
† 1996 Big Eight tournament winner Rankings from AP Poll

The 1995–96 Iowa State Cyclones men's basketball team represented Iowa State University during the 1995–96 NCAA Division I men's basketball season. The Cyclones were coached by Tim Floyd, who was in his second season. They played their home games at Hilton Coliseum in Ames, Iowa.

They finished the season 24–9, 9–5 in Big Eight play to finish in 2nd place. They defeated Nebraska, Missouri, and #5 Kansas to win the 1996 Big Eight conference tournament championship. This was Iowa State's first conference championship in program history. The conference championship earned them a bid to the NCAA tournament and a #5 seed. In the tournament, they defeated Cal and lost to Utah in the round of 32.

Following the 1995–96 academic school year, the Big Eight Conference was dissolved and the Big 12 Conference was formed. The former members of the Big Eight were joined by Baylor, Texas, Texas A&M, and Texas Tech, all formerly of the Southwest Conference.

Games were televised by ESPN, CBS, Creative Sports (Big 8) and the Cyclone Television Network.

== Previous season ==
In the previous season, the Cyclones finished the season 23–11, 6–8 in Big Eight play to finish in 5th place. They defeated #17 Nebraska, #2 Kansas, and lost to # 19 Oklahoma State in the 1995 Big Eight conference tournament championship. They received an at-large bid to the NCAA tournament and a #7 seed. In the tournament they defeated Florida to reach the round of 32, where they lost to North Carolina, who would advance to the Final Four.

== Roster ==
Roster
Name	Position	Class
Dedric Willoughby	Guard	Junior
Kenny Pratt	Forward	Junior
Kelvin Cato	Center	Junior
Shawn Bankhead	Forward	Junior
Jacy Holloway	Guard	Junior
Klay Edwards	Forward	Freshman
Carlo Walton	Guard	Junior
Joe Modderman	Forward	Junior
Tony Rampton	Center	Freshman
Jason Justus	Forward	Junior
Tyler Peterson	Center	Freshman
Shelby Walton	Guard	Junior
Ha-Keem Abdel-Kahliq	Guard	Junior
Sol Harris	Guard	Freshman

== Schedule and results ==
Date time, TV	Rank^{#}	Opponent^{#}	Result	Record	Site city, state
Exhibition
November 13, 1995*; 7:00 pm		Republic of Georgia Select; Exhibition	W 93-49		Hilton Coliseum; Ames, Iowa
November 19, 1995*; 1:30 pm		World Basketball Opportunities (Milwaukee); Exhibition	W 97-71		Hilton Coliseum; Ames, Iowa
Regular season
November 24, 1995*; 1:00 pm		Central Connecticut State	W 70-45	1-0	Hilton Coliseum; Ames, Iowa
November 28, 1995*; 7:00 pm		UW-Milwaukee	W 63-52	2-0	Hilton Coliseum; Ames, Iowa
December 1, 1995*; 8:05 pm, Cyclone Television Network		Tennessee State; Cyclone Challenge	W 75-67	3-0	Hilton Coliseum; Ames, Iowa
December 2, 1995*; 8:00 pm, Cyclone Television Network		Richmond; Cyclone Challenge	W 82-64	4-0	Hilton Coliseum (10,893); Ames, Iowa
December 6, 1995*; 7:05 pm, Cyclone Television Network		at Drake; Iowa Big Four	W 65-62	5-0	Knapp Center; Des Moines, Iowa
December 9, 1995*; 8:05 pm, Cyclone Television Network		No. 12 Iowa; Rivalry	L 50-56	5-1	Hilton Coliseum; Ames, Iowa
December 16, 1995*; 4:05 pm CT, Cyclone Television Network		at Wyoming	W 70-66 ^{OT}	6-1	Arena-Auditorium; Laramie, Wyoming
December 18, 1995*; 7:00 pm		Missouri-St. Louis	W 76-63	7-1	Hilton Coliseum; Ames, Iowa
December 21, 1995*; 7:05 pm, Cyclone Television Network		Princeton; ISU Holiday Classic	W 50-47	8-1	Hilton Coliseum; Ames, Iowa
December 22, 1995*; 8:05 pm, Cyclone Television Network		Samford; ISU Holiday Classic	W 71-59	9-1	Hilton Coliseum; Ames, Iowa
December 28, 1995*; 6:00 pm CT		vs. Purdue; Puerto Rico Invitational	L 60-79	9-2	Eugene Guerra Sports Complex; Bayamón, Puerto Rico
December 29, 1995*; 6:00 pm CT		vs. UNC-Charlotte; Puerto Rico Invitational	W 69-61	10-2	Eugene Guerra Sports Complex; Bayamón, Puerto Rico
January 2, 1996*; 7:05 pm, Cyclone Television Network		Coppin State	W 77-59	11-2	Hilton Coliseum; Ames, Iowa
January 6, 1996; 9:05 pm, ESPN		at Kansas State	L 55-72	11-3 (0-1)	Bramlage Coliseum; Manhattan, Kansas
January 10, 1996*; 7:05 pm, Cyclone Television Network		at Marquette	L 56-58	11-4	Bradley Arena; Milwaukee
January 13, 1996; 3:05 pm, Creative Sports		Oklahoma State	W 79-71	12-4 (1-1)	Hilton Coliseum; Ames, Iowa
January 21, 1996; 2:05 pm, CBS		Missouri	W 73-62	13-4 (2-1)	Hilton Coliseum; Ames, Iowa
January 24, 1996; 8:05 pm, Cyclone Television Network		at Colorado	W 75-63	14-4 (3-1)	Coors Events Center; Boulder, Colorado
January 27, 1996; 12:45 pm, Creative Sports		Oklahoma	W 67-61	15-4 (4-1)	Hilton Coliseum; Ames, Iowa
February 3, 1996; 12:45 pm, Creative Sports		at Nebraska	W 75-65	16-4 (5-1)	Bob Devaney Center; Lincoln, Nebraska
February 7, 1996; 7:05 pm, Cyclone Television Network	No. 21	at No. 3 Kansas	L 70-89	16-5 (5-2)	Allen Fieldhouse; Lawrence, Kansas
February 10, 1996; 12:45 pm, Creative Sports	No. 21	Nebraska	W 74-59	17-5 (6-2)	Hilton Coliseum; Ames, Iowa
February 14, 1996; 7:05 pm, Cyclone Television Network	No. 22	at Oklahoma	W 70-58	18-5 (7-2)	Lloyd Noble Center; Norman, Oklahoma
February 17, 1996; 3:05 pm, Creative Sports	No. 22	No. 5 Kansas	L 50-61	18-6 (7-3)	Hilton Coliseum; Ames, Iowa
February 21, 1996; 7:05 pm, Cyclone Television Network	No. 22	at Oklahoma State	L 46-58	18-7 (7-4)	Gallagher-Iba Arena; Stillwater, Oklahoma
February 24, 1996; 3:05 pm, Creative Sports	No. 22	at Missouri	W 78-74	19-7 (8-4)	Hearnes Center; Columbia, Missouri
February 28, 1996; 7:00 PM	No. 23	Kansas State	L 87-92 ^{2 OT}	19-8 (8-5)	Hilton Coliseum; Ames, Iowa
March 2, 1996; 3:05 pm, Creative Sports	No. 23	Colorado	W 74-65	20-8 (9-5)	Hilton Coliseum; Ames, Iowa
Big Eight tournament
March 8, 1996; 6:10 pm, Creative Sports	No. 23	vs. Nebraska; Quarterfinals	W 62-60	21-8 (9-5)	Kemper Arena; Kansas City, Missouri
March 9, 1996; 3:40 pm, Creative Sports/ESPN2	No. 23	vs. Missouri; Semifinals	W 57-53	22-8 (9-5)	Kemper Arena; Kansas City, Missouri
March 10, 1996; 12:00 pm, CBS	No. 23	vs. No. 5 Kansas; Championship	W 56-55	23-8 (9-5)	Kemper Arena; Kansas City, Missouri
NCAA Tournament
March 14, 1996*; 7:00 pm, CBS	(#5) No. 17	vs. (#12) California; First round	W 74-64	24-8 (9-5)	Reunion Arena; Dallas, Texas
March 16, 1996; 1:20 pm, CBS	(#5) No. 17	vs. (#4) Utah; Second round	L 67-73	24-9 (9-5)	Reunion Arena; Dallas
*Non-conference game. ^{#}Rankings from AP poll. (#) Tournament seedings in parentheses. All times are in Central Time.

== Awards and honors ==
- All-Americans

Dedric Willoughby (HM)

- All-Big Eight Selections

Dedric Willoughby (First Team)
Kenny Pratt (Second Team)

- All-Big Eight tournament Team

Dedric Willoughby (MVP)
Kelvin Cato
Kenny Pratt

- Big Eight Conference Newcomer of the Year

Dedric Willoughby

- Big Eight Conference Coach of the Year

Tim Floyd

- Ralph A. Olsen Award

Dedric Willoughby
