= 1995–96 Oklahoma Sooners men's basketball team =

American college basketball season

1995–96 Oklahoma Sooners men's basketball

NCAA tournament, First round
- Conference: Big Eight Conference
- Record: 18–12 (Note: Adjusted from 17–13) (8–6 Big Eight)
- Head coach: Kelvin Sampson (2nd season)
- Home arena: Lloyd Noble Center (Capacity: 10,871)

1995–96 Big Eight Conference men's basketball standings
	Conf.				Overall
Team	W		L	PCT	W		L	PCT
No. 4 Kansas	12	–	2	.857	29	–	5	.853
No. 17 Iowa State †	9	–	5	.643	24	–	9	.727
Oklahoma (Note: Adjusted from 17–13 as Purdue forfeited 18 wins)	8	–	6	.571	18	–	12	.600
Kansas State	7	–	7	.500	17	–	12	.586
Oklahoma State	7	–	7	.500	17	–	10	.630
Missouri	6	–	8	.429	18	–	15	.545
Nebraska	4	–	10	.286	21	–	14	.600
Colorado	3	–	11	.214	9	–	18	.333
† 1996 Big Eight tournament winner Rankings from AP Poll

The 1995–96 Oklahoma Sooners men's basketball team represented the University of Oklahoma in competitive college basketball during the 1995–96 NCAA Division I men's basketball season. The Oklahoma Sooners men's basketball team played its home games in the Lloyd Noble Center and was a member of the National Collegiate Athletic Association's Big Eight Conference.

The team posted a 17–13 overall record (8–6 Big Eight). The Sooners received a bid to the 1996 NCAA tournament as No. 10 seed in the Southeast region. Oklahoma lost to No. 7 seed Temple, 61–43, in the opening round.

== Roster ==
1995–96 Oklahoma Sooners men's basketball team
Players	Coaches
Pos. / # / Name / Height / Weight / Year / Hometown; F / 12 / Ryan Minor / 6 ft 7 in (2.01 m) / 215 lb (98 kg) / Sr / Hammon, Oklahoma	Head coach: Kelvin Sampson; Assistant coach(es) Legend: (C) Team captain; (S) Suspended; (I) Ineligible; (W) Walk-on; Injured; Current redshirt; Roster

== Schedule and results ==
Date time, TV	Rank^{#}	Opponent^{#}	Result	Record	Site (attendance) city, state
Non-conference regular season
Nov 15, 1995*		Jackson State	W 99–68	1–0	Lloyd Noble Center; Norman, Oklahoma
Nov 17, 1995*		at Georgia Tech	L 72–83	1–1	Alexander Memorial Coliseum; Atlanta, Georgia
Nov 29, 1995*		Texas Tech	L 69–81	1–2	Lloyd Noble Center; Norman, Oklahoma
Dec 6, 1995*		at Purdue	L 63–77	1–3	Mackey Arena; West Lafayette, Indiana
Dec 9, 1995*		UTSA	W 107–75	2–3	Lloyd Noble Center; Norman, Oklahoma
Dec 16, 1995*		Nicholls State	W 87–47	3–3	Lloyd Noble Center; Norman, Oklahoma
Dec 18, 1995*		Texas Southern	W 77–63	4–3	Lloyd Noble Center; Norman, Oklahoma
Dec 21, 1995*		at Oral Roberts	W 87–53	5–3	Mabee Center; Tulsa, Oklahoma
Dec 23, 1995*		Drexel	W 85–78	6–3	Lloyd Noble Center; Norman, Oklahoma
Dec 29, 1995*		vs. Baylor; All-College Tournament	W 84–71	7–3	Myriad Convention Center; Oklahoma City, Oklahoma
Dec 30, 1995*		vs. Florida; All-College Tournament	L 72–76 ^{OT}	7–4	Myriad Convention Center; Oklahoma City, Oklahoma
Jan 3, 1996*		SMU	W 84–74	8–4	Lloyd Noble Center; Norman, Oklahoma
Big Eight regular season
Jan 9, 1996		at Kansas State	W 64–59	9–4 (1–0)	Bramlage Coliseum; Manhattan, Kansas
Jan 13, 1996		Nebraska	W 117–100 ^{3OT}	10–4 (2–0)	Lloyd Noble Center; Norman, Oklahoma
Jan 15, 1996		at Missouri	L 73–75	10–5 (2–1)	Hearnes Center; Columbia, Missouri
Jan 20, 1996		Kansas State	L 60–75	10–6 (2–2)	Lloyd Noble Center; Norman, Oklahoma
Jan 22, 1996		at No. 3 Kansas	L 66–72	10–7 (2–3)	Allen Fieldhouse; Lawrence, Kansas
Jan 27, 1996		at Iowa State	L 61–67	10–8 (2–4)	Hilton Coliseum; Ames, Iowa
Jan 31, 1996*		at Texas	W 67–65 ^{OT}	11–8	Frank Erwin Center; Austin, Texas
Feb 3, 1996		Missouri	W 104–68	12–8 (3–4)	Lloyd Noble Center; Norman, Oklahoma
Feb 5, 1996		Oklahoma State	W 81–75 ^{OT}	13–8 (4–4)	Lloyd Noble Center; Norman, Oklahoma
Feb 10, 1996*		Mississippi State	L 71–76	13–9	Lloyd Noble Center; Norman, Oklahoma
Feb 14, 1996		No. 22 Iowa State	L 58–70	13–10 (4–5)	Lloyd Noble Center; Norman, Oklahoma
Feb 17, 1996		at Colorado	W 119–88	14–10 (5–5)	Coors Events Center; Boulder, Colorado
Feb 21, 1996		Colorado	W 81–59	15–10 (6–5)	Lloyd Noble Center; Norman, Oklahoma
Feb 25, 1996		at Nebraska	W 80–76 ^{OT}	16–10 (7–5)	Bob Devaney Sports Center; Lincoln, Nebraska
Feb 28, 1996		at Oklahoma State	L 67–89	16–11 (7–6)	Gallagher-Iba Arena; Stillwater, Oklahoma
Mar 2, 1996		No. 3 Kansas	W 85–79	17–11 (8–6)	Lloyd Noble Center; Norman, Oklahoma
Big Eight Tournament
Mar 8, 1996*		vs. Missouri; Quarterfinals	L 88–92 ^{OT}	17–12	Kemper Arena; Kansas City, Missouri
NCAA Tournament
Mar 15, 1996*	(10 SE)	vs. (7 SE) Temple; First round	L 43–61	17–13	Orlando Arena; Orlando, Florida
*Non-conference game. ^{#}Rankings from AP Poll. (#) Tournament seedings in parentheses. All times are in Central Time. (#) during NCAA Tournament is seed within region SE=Southeast.
