= 1995–96 Texas Tech Red Raiders basketball team =

American college basketball season

1995–96 Texas Tech Red Raiders basketball

SWC regular season champion SWC Classic tournament champion

NCAA Division I men's basketball tournament Sweet Sixteen (vacated), L, 98–90 v. Georgetown
- Conference: Southwest Conference

Ranking
- Coaches: No. 10
- AP: No. 8
- Record: 28–1 (2 wins, 1 loss vacated) (14–0 SWC)
- Head coach: James Dickey (5th season)
- Assistant coaches: Will Flemons (2nd season); Jason Weese (2nd season)
- Home arena: Lubbock Municipal Coliseum

1995–96 Southwest Conference men's basketball standings
	Conf.				Overall
Team	W		L	PCT	W		L	PCT
No. 8 Texas Tech †	14	–	0	1.000	30	–	2	.938
Houston	11	–	3	.786	17	–	10	.630
Texas	10	–	4	.714	21	–	10	.677
TCU	6	–	8	.429	15	–	15	.500
Rice	5	–	9	.357	14	–	14	.500
Texas A&M	3	–	11	.214	11	–	16	.407
SMU	3	–	11	.214	8	–	20	.286
Baylor	4	–	10	.286	9	–	18	.333
† 1996 SWC tournament winner Rankings from AP Poll

The 1995–96 Texas Tech Red Raiders men's basketball team represented Texas Tech University in the Southwest Conference during the 1995–96 NCAA Division I men's basketball season. This was Texas Tech's final year in the conference before becoming a charter member of the Big 12 Conference. The head coach was James Dickey, his 5th year with the team. The Red Raiders played their home games in the Lubbock Municipal Coliseum in Lubbock, Texas.

== Roster ==
1995–96 Texas Tech Red Raiders men's basketball team
Players
Coaches

Pos.	#	Name	Height	Weight	Year	Previous school	Hometown
G	00	Koy Smith	6 ft 5 in (1.96 m)	—	Sr
G		Jason Martin	5 ft 10 in (1.78 m)	—	Sr
PF	20	Darvin Ham	6 ft 7 in (2.01 m)	235 lb (107 kg)	Sr	Otero JC	Saginaw, MI
SF	21	Cory Carr	6 ft 4 in (1.93 m)	215 lb (98 kg)	So	Kingsland HS	Kingsland, AR
C	24	Tony Battie	6 ft 11 in (2.11 m)	230 lb (104 kg)	So	South Oak Cliff HS	Dallas, TX
SF	33	Jason Sasser	6 ft 7 in (2.01 m)	220 lb (100 kg)	Sr	Justin F. Kimball HS	Dallas, TX

Head coach

- James Dickey (Central Arkansas)

Assistant coach(es)

- Will Flemons (Texas Tech)

Legend

- (C) Team captain
- (S) Suspended
- (I) Ineligible
- (W) Walk-on
- Injured
- Current redshirt

== Schedule and results ==
Date time, TV	Rank^{#}	Opponent^{#}	Result	Record	Site city, state
Non-conference Regular season
Nov 26, 1995*		Prairie View A&M	W 101–54	1–0	Lubbock Municipal Coliseum; Lubbock, Texas
Nov 29, 1995*		at Oklahoma	W 81–69	2–0	Lloyd Noble Center; Norman, Oklahoma
Dec 2, 1995*		at Arkansas-Little Rock	W 71–62	3–0	Barton Coliseum; Little Rock, Arkansas
Dec 9, 1995*		Southwest Missouri State	W 97–74	4–0	Lubbock Municipal Coliseum; Lubbock, Texas
Dec 14, 1995*		Nicholls State	W 95–56	5–0	Lubbock Municipal Coliseum; Lubbock, Texas
Dec 18, 1995*		Old Dominion	W 89–84	6–0	Lubbock Municipal Coliseum; Lubbock, Texas
Dec 22, 1995*		BYU	W 81–71	7–0	Lubbock Municipal Coliseum; Lubbock, Texas
Dec 27, 1995*		vs. Eastern Michigan	L 77–93	7–1	Don Haskins Center; El Paso, Texas
Dec 28, 1995*		vs. La Salle	W 62–58	8–1	Don Haskins Center; El Paso, Texas
Jan 3, 1996*		Montana State	W 86–67	9–1	Lubbock Municipal Coliseum; Lubbock, Texas
Jan 6, 1996*		at East Tennessee State	W 99–81	10–1	Memorial Center; Johnson City, Tennessee
SWC Regular season
Jan 10, 1996		at TCU	W 90–86	11–1 (1–0)	Daniel-Meyer Coliseum; Fort Worth, Texas
Jan 13, 1996		Texas A&M	W 82–54	12–1 (2–0)	Lubbock Municipal Coliseum; Lubbock, Texas
Jan 17, 1996	No. 25	at Baylor	W 75–69	13–1 (3–0)	Ferrell Center; Waco, Texas
Jan 20, 1996	No. 25	Houston	W 95–76	14–1 (4–0)	Lubbock Municipal Coliseum; Lubbock, Texas
Jan 23, 1996	No. 22	at SMU	W 72–60	15–1 (5–0)	Moody Coliseum; Dallas, Texas
Jan 28, 1996	No. 22	Texas	W 79–78	16–1 (6–0)	Lubbock Municipal Coliseum; Lubbock, Texas
Jan 31, 1996*	No. 15	at Oral Roberts	W 78–74	17–1	Mabee Center; Tulsa, Oklahoma
Feb 3, 1996	No. 15	at Rice	W 79–57	18–1 (7–0)	Tudor Fieldhouse; Houston, Texas
Feb 7, 1996	No. 13	TCU	W 85–70	19–1 (8–0)	Lubbock Municipal Coliseum; Lubbock, Texas
Feb 10, 1996	No. 13	at Texas A&M	W 66–63	20–1 (9–0)	G. Rollie White Coliseum; College Station, Texas
Feb 14, 1996	No. 12	Baylor	W 78–72	21–1 (10–0)	Lubbock Municipal Coliseum; Lubbock, Texas
Feb 17, 1996	No. 12	at Houston	W 93–84	22–1 (11–0)	Hofheinz Pavilion; Houston, Texas
Feb 20, 1996	No. 9	SMU	W 75–54	23–1 (12–0)	Lubbock Municipal Coliseum; Lubbock, Texas
Feb 24, 1996	No. 9	at Texas	W 75–58	24–1 (13–0)	Frank Erwin Center; Austin, Texas
Mar 2, 1996	No. 9	Rice	W 84–70	25–1 (14–0)	Lubbock Municipal Coliseum; Lubbock, Texas
SWC Tournament
Mar 7, 1996*	No. 7	vs. Texas A&M; Quarterfinal	W 85–57	26–1	Reunion Arena; Dallas, Texas
Mar 8, 1996*	No. 7	vs. Rice; Semifinal	W 68–53	27–1	Reunion Arena; Dallas, Texas
Mar 9, 1996*	No. 7	vs. Texas; Championship Game	W 75–73	28–1	Reunion Arena; Dallas, Texas
NCAA Tournament
Mar 15, 1996*	(3 E) No. 7	vs. (14 E) Northern Illinois; First round	W 74–73	29–1	Richmond Coliseum; Richmond, Virginia
Mar 17, 1996*	(3 E) No. 7	vs. (6 E) No. 25 North Carolina; Second Round	W 92–73	30–1	Richmond Coliseum; Richmond, Virginia
Mar 21, 1996*	(3 E) No. 7	vs. (2 E) No. 4 Georgetown; Southeast Regional semifinal – Sweet Sixteen	L 90–98	30–2	Georgia Dome; Atlanta, Georgia
*Non-conference game. ^{#}Rankings from AP Poll. (#) Tournament seedings in parentheses. E=East.

== Rankings ==
Ranking movements Legend: ██ Increase in ranking ██ Decrease in ranking — = Not ranked
	Week																		
Poll	Pre	1	2	3	4	5	6	7	8	9	10	11	12	13	14	15	16	17	Final
AP	—	—	—	—	—	—	—	—	—	25	23	15	13	12	9	9	7	8	Not released
Coaches	—	—	—	—	—	—	—	—	—	—	23	20	14	12	9	8	7	7	10

== NCAA violations ==
The NCAA Committee on Infractions found violations involving nine sports dating back to 1990 and included NCAA rules infractions in the areas of eligibility, extra benefits, recruiting, unethical conduct, failure to monitor and lack of institutional control. For the next four years, Texas Tech was placed on probation and the 1996–97 men's basketball team was ineligible for conference wins and participation in the 1997 NCAA Division I men's basketball tournament.
