= 1995–96 Houston Cougars men's basketball team =

American college basketball season

1995–96 Houston Cougars men's basketball
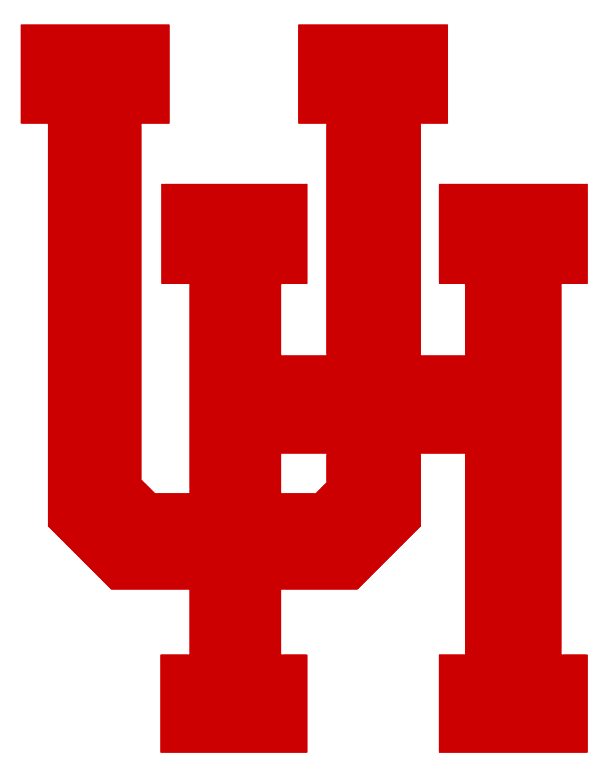
- Conference: Southwest Conference
- Record: 17–10 (11–3 SWC)
- Head coach: Alvin Brooks (3rd season)
- Home arena: Hofheinz Pavilion

1995–96 Southwest Conference men's basketball standings
	Conf.				Overall
Team	W		L	PCT	W		L	PCT
No. 8 Texas Tech †	14	–	0	1.000	30	–	2	.938
Houston	11	–	3	.786	17	–	10	.630
Texas	10	–	4	.714	21	–	10	.677
TCU	6	–	8	.429	15	–	15	.500
Rice	5	–	9	.357	14	–	14	.500
Texas A&M	3	–	11	.214	11	–	16	.407
SMU	3	–	11	.214	8	–	20	.286
Baylor	4	–	10	.286	9	–	18	.333
† 1996 SWC tournament winner Rankings from AP Poll

The 1995–96 Houston Cougars men's basketball team represented the University of Houston in NCAA Division I competition in the 1995–96 season.

Houston, coached by Alvin Brooks, played its home games in the Hofheinz Pavilion in Houston, Texas. This was Houston's final year as a member of the Southwest Conference before it dissolved and they joined Conference USA.

== Roster ==
1995–96 Houston Cougars men's basketball team
Players	Coaches
Pos. / # / Name / Height / Weight / Year / Previous school / Hometown; G / 25 / Damon Jones / 6 ft 3 in (1.91 m) / 185 lb (84 kg) / So / Ball HS / Galveston, TX	Head coach: Alvin Brooks (Lamar); Assistant coach(es) Legend: (C) Team captain; (S) Suspended; (I) Ineligible; (W) Walk-on; Injured; Current redshirt; Roster

== Schedule and results ==
Date time, TV	Rank^{#}	Opponent^{#}	Result	Record	Site city, state
Regular season
Nov 25, 1995*		Houston Baptist	W 91–59	1–0	Hofheinz Pavilion; Houston, Texas
Nov 27, 1995*		at McNeese State	L 81–83 ^{OT}	1–1	Burton Coliseum; Lake Charles, Louisiana
Nov 29, 1995*		at UTSA	W 94–90	2–1	Convocation Center; San Antonio, Texas
Dec 2, 1995*		No. 4 Arizona	L 69–73	2–2	Hofheinz Pavilion; Houston, Texas
Dec 6, 1995*		at USC	L 73–96	2–3	Los Angeles Memorial Sports Arena; Los Angeles, California
Dec 9, 1995*		at Colorado	L 74–77	2–4	Coors Events/Conference Center; Boulder, Colorado
Dec 19, 1995*		at Tennessee	L 49–69	2–5	Thompson–Boling Arena; Knoxville, Tennessee
Dec 21, 1995*		Ole Miss	L 67–76	2–6	Hofheinz Pavilion; Houston, Texas
Dec 28, 1995*		Northeast Louisiana	W 98–64	3–6	Hofheinz Pavilion; Houston, Texas
Jan 2, 1996*		Texas Lutheran	W 88–66	4–6	Hofheinz Pavilion; Houston, Texas
Jan 6, 1996*		No. 3 Memphis	W 69–67	5–6	Hofheinz Pavilion; Houston, Texas
Jan 8, 1996		SMU	W 63–62	6–6 (1–0)	Hofheinz Pavilion; Houston, Texas
Jan 13, 1996		at Rice	W 76–74	7–6 (2–0)	Rice Gymnasium; Houston, Texas
Jan 17, 1996		TCU	W 89–86	8–6 (3–0)	Hofheinz Pavilion; Houston, Texas
Jan 20, 1996		at No. 25 Texas Tech	L 76–95	8–7 (3–1)	Lubbock Municipal Coliseum; Lubbock, Texas
Jan 24, 1996		Texas A&M	W 78–67 ^{OT}	9–7 (4–1)	Hofheinz Pavilion; Houston, Texas
Jan 27, 1996		at Baylor	W 91–84	10–7 (5–1)	Ferrell Center; Waco, Texas
Feb 3, 1996		at Texas	L 63–80	10–8 (5–2)	Frank Erwin Center; Austin, Texas
Feb 5, 1996*		at James Madison	W 97–72	11–8	JMU Convocation Center; Harrisonburg, Virginia
Feb 10, 1996		Rice	W 63–59	12–8 (6–2)	Hofheinz Pavilion; Houston, Texas
Feb 14, 1996		at TCU	W 86–82	13–8 (7–2)	Daniel-Meyer Coliseum; Fort Worth, Texas
Feb 17, 1996		No. 12 Texas Tech	L 84–93	13–9 (7–3)	Hofheinz Pavilion; Houston, Texas
Feb 21, 1996		at Texas A&M	W 79–75	14–9 (8–3)	G. Rollie White Coliseum; College Station, Texas
Feb 24, 1996		Baylor	W 79–69	15–9 (9–3)	Hofheinz Pavilion; Houston, Texas
Feb 28, 1996		at SMU	W 62–59	16–9 (10–3)	Moody Coliseum; University Park, Texas
Mar 2, 1996		Texas	W 86–76	17–9 (11–3)	Hofheinz Pavilion; Houston, Texas
SWC tournament
Mar 7, 1996*	(2)	vs. (7) SMU; Quarterfinals	L 57–62	17–10	Reunion Arena; Dallas, Texas
*Non-conference game. ^{#}Rankings from AP Poll. (#) Tournament seedings in parentheses. All times are in Central Time.
