= Steve Robinson (basketball) =

American college basketball coach (born 1957)

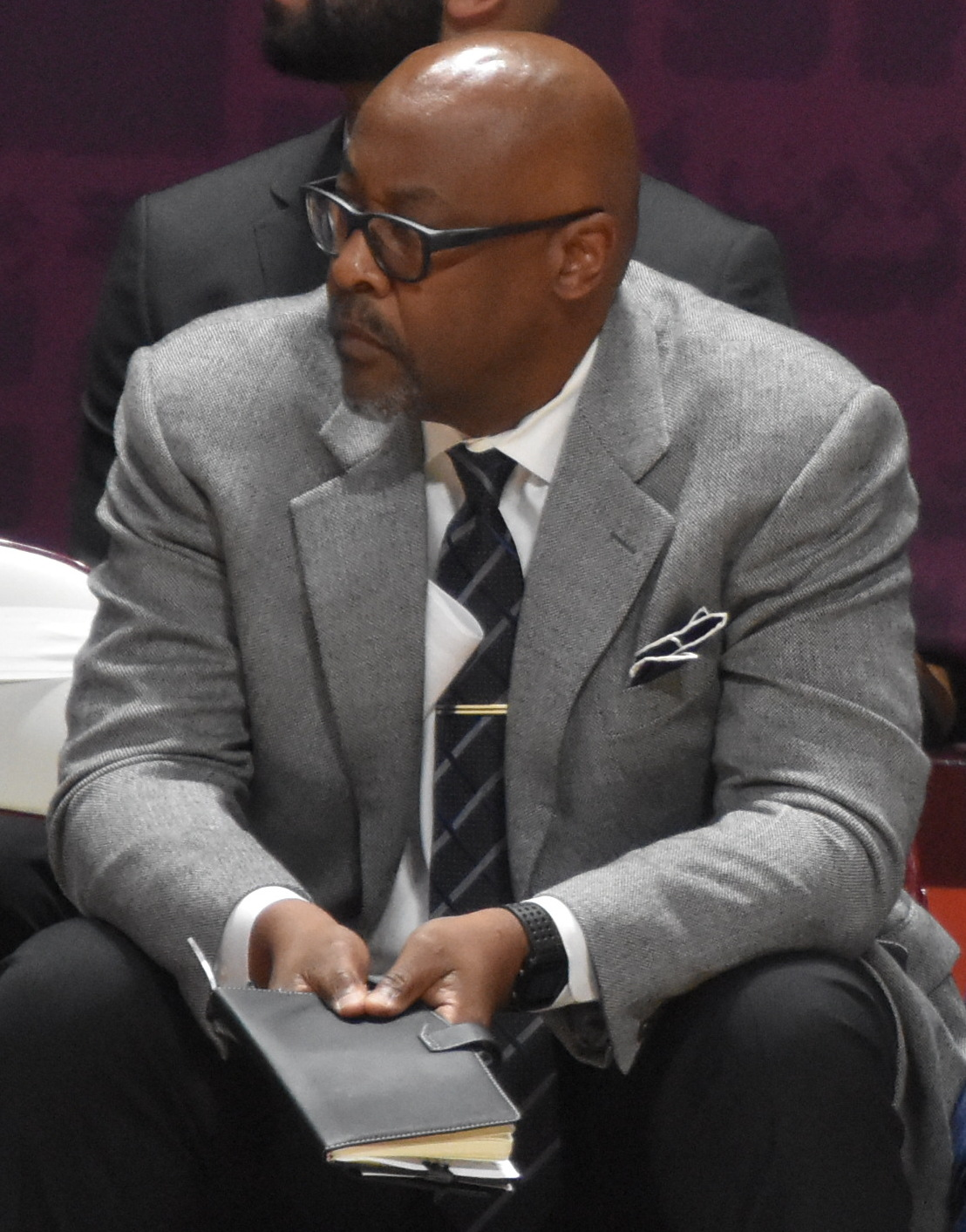
- Robinson in 2020

Biographical details
- Born: October 29, 1957 (age 68); Roanoke, Virginia, U.S.

Playing career
- 1978–1980: Ferrum JC
- 1980–1981: Radford

Coaching career (HC unless noted)
- 1983–1986: Radford (assistant)
- 1986–1988: Cornell (assistant)
- 1988–1995: Kansas (assistant)
- 1995–1997: Tulsa
- 1997–2002: Florida State
- 2002–2003: Kansas (assistant)
- 2003–2021: North Carolina (assistant)
- 2021–2025: Arizona (assistant)

Head coaching record
- Overall: 110–104
- Tournaments: 2–3 (NCAA Division I)

Accomplishments and honors

Championships
- MVC tournament (1996)

Awards
- WAC Coach of the Year (1997)

Steve Arnette Robinson (born October 29, 1957) is an American former college basketball coach. His last position was as assistant men's basketball coach at the University of Arizona. Robinson served as the head men's basketball coach at the University of Tulsa from 1995 to 1997 and Florida State University from 1997 to 2002. He was an assistant to Roy Williams for 26 years, including two stints at the University of Kansas (1988–1995 and 2002–2003), and at North Carolina following Williams's move from Kansas in 2003. Robinson assisted the North Carolina Tar Heels to three NCAA Division tournament titles, in 2005, 2009, and 2017. As a head coach, Robinson led his teams to the NCAA tournament three times, twice with Tulsa and once with Florida State. In 1997, he was named WAC Mountain Division Coach of the year.

== Early life and family ==
Robinson grew up in Roanoke, Virginia and attended William Fleming High School. He earned his bachelor's degree in health and physical science from Radford University in 1981, followed by a master's degree in counseling in 1985. Robinson and his wife, Lisa, have four children: daughters Shauna and Kiaya and sons Tarron and Denzel. Denzel played two seasons for the Tar Heels.

== Head coaching record ==
Record table
| Season | Team | Overall | Conference | Standing | Postseason |
|---|---|---|---|---|---|
Tulsa Golden Hurricane (Missouri Valley Conference) (1995–1996)
| 1995–96 | Tulsa | 23–8 | 12–6 | 3rd | NCAA Division I first round |
Tulsa Golden Hurricane (Western Athletic Conference) (1996–1997)
| 1996–97 | Tulsa | 23–10 | 12–4 | 2nd | NCAA Division I second round |
| Tulsa: | | 46–18 (.719) | 24–10 (.706) | | |
Florida State Seminoles (Atlantic Coast Conference) (1997–2002)
| 1997–98 | Florida State | 18–14 | 6–10 | T–6th | NCAA Division I second round |
| 1998–99 | Florida State | 13–17 | 5–11 | T–7th | |
| 1999–00 | Florida State | 12–17 | 6–10 | T–6th | |
| 2000–01 | Florida State | 9–21 | 4–12 | 8th | |
| 2001–02 | Florida State | 12–17 | 4–12 | T–7th | |
| Florida State: | | 64–86 (.427) | 25–55 (.313) | | |
| Total: | | 110–104 (.514) | | | |
National champion Postseason invitational champion Conference regular season champion Conference regular season and conference tournament champion Division regular season champion Division regular season and conference tournament champion Conference tournament champion
