= 1995–96 Utah Utes men's basketball team =

American college basketball season

1995–96 Utah Utes men's basketball

WAC Regular season champions

NCAA tournament, Sweet Sixteen
- Conference: Western Athletic Conference

Ranking
- Coaches: No. 12
- AP: No. 12
- Record: 27–7 (15–3 WAC)
- Head coach: Rick Majerus (7th season)
- Captain: Keith Van Horn
- Home arena: Jon M. Huntsman Center

1995–96 WAC men's basketball standings
	Conf.				Overall
Team	W		L	PCT	W		L	PCT
No. 12 Utah	15	–	3	.833	27	–	7	.794
No. 23 New Mexico †	14	–	4	.778	28	–	5	.848
Fresno State	13	–	5	.722	22	–	11	.667
Colorado State	11	–	7	.611	18	–	12	.600
BYU	9	–	9	.500	15	–	13	.536
Wyoming	8	–	10	.444	14	–	15	.483
San Diego State	8	–	10	.444	15	–	14	.517
Hawaii	7	–	11	.389	10	–	18	.357
UTEP	4	–	14	.222	13	–	15	.464
Air Force	1	–	17	.056	5	–	23	.179
† 1996 WAC tournament winner Rankings from AP Poll

The 1995–96 Utah Utes men's basketball team represented the University of Utah as a member of the Western Athletic Conference during the 1995–96 men's basketball season. Led by head coach Rick Majerus, the Utes made a run to the Sweet Sixteen of the NCAA tournament. The team finished with an overall record of 27–7 (15–3 WAC).

== Roster ==
1995–96 Utah Utes men's basketball team
Players
Coaches

Pos.	#	Name	Height	Weight	Year	Hometown
PG	10	Ted Cierzniak	6 ft 2 in (1.88 m)	195 lb (88 kg)	Sr	Lakewood, Colorado
SG	15	Derek Broomhall	6 ft 5 in (1.96 m)	210 lb (95 kg)	Fr	Sacramento, California
SF	18	Brent Wieland	6 ft 8 in (2.03 m)	215 lb (98 kg)	Jr	Prosper, Texas
PG	24	Andre Miller	6 ft 3 in (1.91 m)	200 lb (91 kg)	Fr	Los Angeles, California
SF	29	Corey Trautner	6 ft 7 in (2.01 m)	230 lb (104 kg)	Sr	Millville, Utah
G	34	Drew Hansen	—	—	So
F	44	Keith Van Horn (C)	6 ft 10 in (2.08 m)	235 lb (107 kg)	Jr	Diamond Bar, California
C	51	Michael Doleac	6 ft 11 in (2.11 m)	260 lb (118 kg)	So	Portland, Oregon

Head coach

- Rick Majerus (Marquette)

Assistant coach(es)

Legend

- (C) Team captain
- (S) Suspended
- (I) Ineligible
- (W) Walk-on
- Injured
- Current redshirt

== Schedule and results ==
Date time, TV	Rank^{#}	Opponent^{#}	Result	Record	Site city, state
Non-conference regular season
Nov 25, 1995*	No. 8	vs. No. 2 Kansas; The Classic	L 68–79	0–1	Kemper Arena; Kansas City, Missouri
Nov 29, 1995*	No. 14	at Texas	W 70–69	1–1	Frank Erwin Center; Austin, Texas
Dec 1, 1995*	No. 14	Lewis–Clark	W 91–64	2–1	Jon M. Huntsman Center; Salt Lake City, Utah
Dec 4, 1995*	No. 14	Drake	W 86–50	3–1	Jon M. Huntsman Center; Salt Lake City, Utah
Dec 6, 1995*	No. 14	at Weber State	W 89–60	4–1	Dee Events Center; Ogden, Utah
Dec 9, 1995*	No. 14	Utah State	W 59–43	5–1	Jon M. Huntsman Center; Salt Lake City, Utah
Dec 15, 1995*	No. 13	St. Thomas (MN)	W 87–63	6–1	Jon M. Huntsman Center; Salt Lake City, Utah
Dec 21, 1995*	No. 13	at No. 12 Wake Forest	L 56–60	6–2	Lawrence Joel Coliseum; Winston-Salem, North Carolina
Dec 23, 1995*	No. 13	USC	W 84–49	7–2	Jon M. Huntsman Center; Salt Lake City, Utah
Dec 27, 1995*	No. 15	Cal State Fullerton	W 108–58	8–2	Jon M. Huntsman Center; Salt Lake City, Utah
WAC regular season
Jan 2, 1996	No. 15	BYU	W 83–77	9–2 (1–0)	Jon M. Huntsman Center; Salt Lake City, Utah
Mar 2, 1996	No. 10	at BYU	W 96–85	23–5 (15–3)	Marriott Center; Provo, Utah
WAC Tournament
Mar 7, 1996*	(1) No. 10	vs. (8) Hawaii; Quarterfinals	W 76–63	24–5	The Pit; Albuquerque, New Mexico
Mar 8, 1996*	(1) No. 10	vs. (4) Colorado State; Semifinals	W 71–69	25–5	The Pit; Albuquerque, New Mexico
Mar 9, 1996*	(1) No. 10	vs. (2) New Mexico; Championship	L 60–64	25–6	The Pit; Albuquerque, New Mexico
NCAA Tournament
Mar 14, 1996*	(4 MW) No. 12	vs. (13 MW) Canisius; First round	W 72–43	26–6	Reunion Arena; Dallas, Texas
Mar 16, 1996*	(4 MW) No. 12	vs. (5 MW) No. 17 Iowa State; Second Round	W 73–67	27–6	Reunion Arena; Dallas, Texas
Mar 21, 1996*	(4 MW) No. 12	vs. (1 MW) No. 2 Kentucky; Midwest Regional semifinal – Sweet Sixteen	L 70–101	27–7	Hubert H. Humphrey Metrodome (30,334); Minneapolis, Minnesota
*Non-conference game. ^{#}Rankings from AP Poll. (#) Tournament seedings in parentheses. MW=Midwest.

== Rankings ==
Ranking movements Legend: ██ Increase in ranking ██ Decrease in ranking
	Week																		
Poll	Pre	1	2	3	4	5	6	7	8	9	10	11	12	13	14	15	16	17	Final
AP	10	8	14	14	13	13	15	15	13	15	10	7	7	7	8	10	10	12	Not released
Coaches	11	10	17	14	14	14	16	16	10	11	9	7	7	7	8	10	8	10	12

== Awards and honors ==
- Keith Van Horn – Consensus Second-team All-American, WAC Player of the Year (2x)
