= 1995–96 New Mexico Lobos men's basketball team =

American college basketball season

1995–96 New Mexico Lobos men's basketball

WAC tournament champion

NCAA tournament, Second round
- Conference: Western Athletic Conference

Ranking
- Coaches: No. 25
- AP: No. 23
- Record: 28–5 (14–4 WAC)
- Head coach: Dave Bliss (8th season)
- Home arena: University Arena

1995–96 WAC men's basketball standings
	Conf.				Overall
Team	W		L	PCT	W		L	PCT
No. 12 Utah	15	–	3	.833	27	–	7	.794
No. 23 New Mexico †	14	–	4	.778	28	–	5	.848
Fresno State	13	–	5	.722	22	–	11	.667
Colorado State	11	–	7	.611	18	–	12	.600
BYU	9	–	9	.500	15	–	13	.536
Wyoming	8	–	10	.444	14	–	15	.483
San Diego State	8	–	10	.444	15	–	14	.517
Hawaii	7	–	11	.389	10	–	18	.357
UTEP	4	–	14	.222	13	–	15	.464
Air Force	1	–	17	.056	5	–	23	.179
† 1996 WAC tournament winner Rankings from AP Poll

The 1995–96 New Mexico Lobos men's basketball team represented the University of New Mexico as a member of the Western Athletic Conference during the 1995–96 NCAA Division I men's basketball season. The Lobos were coached by head coach Dave Bliss and played their home games at the University Arena, also known as "The Pit", in Albuquerque, New Mexico. New Mexico finished 2nd in the WAC regular season standings and beat Utah in the championship game of the WAC Tournament to receive an automatic bid to the NCAA tournament as No. 7 seed in the East region. After defeating Kansas State in the opening round, New Mexico was beaten in the round of 32 by Georgetown, 73–62, to finish with a 28–5 record (14–4 WAC).

== Roster ==
1995–96 New Mexico Lobos men's basketball team
Players
Coaches

Pos.	#	Name	Height	Weight	Year	Hometown
F	4	Kenny Thomas	6 ft 7 in (2.01 m)	230 lb (104 kg)	Fr	Albuquerque, New Mexico
G	5	Charles Smith	6 ft 4 in (1.93 m)	195 lb (88 kg)	Jr	Fort Worth, Texas
F	22	Clayton Shields	6 ft 8 in (2.03 m)	205 lb (93 kg)	So	Baytown, Texas
G	32	David Gibson	6 ft 2 in (1.88 m)	—	So
C		Daniel Santiago	7 ft 1 in (2.16 m)	—	So	Lubbock, Texas

Head coach

- Dave Bliss

Assistant coach(es)

Legend

- (C) Team captain
- (S) Suspended
- (I) Ineligible
- (W) Walk-on
- Injured
- Current redshirt

== Schedule and results ==
Date time, TV	Rank^{#}	Opponent^{#}	Result	Record	Site (attendance) city, state
Regular season
Nov 17, 1995*		Simon Fraser	W 81–67	1–0	The Pit (16,001); Albuquerque, New Mexico
Nov 24, 1995*		Texas-Arlington	W 76–56	2–0	The Pit (15,386); Albuquerque, New Mexico
Nov 25, 1995*		Mercer	W 107–72	3–0	The Pit (15,512); Albuquerque, New Mexico
Nov 29, 1995*		Texas-Rio Grande Valley	W 80–56	4–0	The Pit (15,822); Albuquerque, New Mexico
Dec 5, 1995*		at Arizona State	W 86–79	5–0	ASU Activity Center (9,539); Tempe, Arizona
Dec 8, 1995*		New Mexico State	W 91–75	6–0	The Pit (18,018); Albuquerque, New Mexico
Dec 16, 1995*		at New Mexico State	W 69–68	7–0	Pan American Center (10,517); Las Cruces, New Mexico
Dec 19, 1995*		Southwest Texas State	W 72–62	8–0	The Pit (16,409); Albuquerque, New Mexico
Dec 28, 1995*		Dartmouth	W 91–66	9–0	The Pit (16,593); Albuquerque, New Mexico
Dec 29, 1995*		Boston University	W 95–83	10–0	The Pit (17,046); Albuquerque, New Mexico
Jan 2, 1996	No. 25	at Fresno State	L 75–76	10–1 (0–1)	Selland Arena (9,802); Fresno, California
Jan 4, 1996	No. 25	at Air Force	W 61–49	11–1 (1–1)	Clune Arena (1,144); Colorado Springs, Colorado
Jan 8, 1996	No. 25	San Diego State	W 77–74	12–1 (2–1)	The Pit (16,263); Albuquerque, New Mexico
Jan 10, 1996	No. 25	Hawaii	W 78–72	13–1 (3–1)	The Pit (17,206); Albuquerque, New Mexico
Jan 13, 1996	No. 25	at Wyoming	L 58–61	13–2 (3–2)	Arena-Auditorium (6,737); Laramie, Wyoming
Jan 15, 1996		at Colorado State	W 67–65	14–2 (4–2)	Moby Arena (7,339); Fort Collins, Colorado
Jan 20, 1996		at UTEP	W 64–60	15–2 (5–2)	Don Haskins Center (12,222); El Paso, Texas
Jan 25, 1996		BYU	W 83–77	16–2 (6–2)	The Pit (17,627); Albuquerque, New Mexico
Jan 27, 1996		No. 10 Utah	L 64–82	16–3 (6–3)	The Pit (18,018); Albuquerque, New Mexico
Feb 1, 1996		at BYU	W 88–81	17–3 (7–3)	Marriott Center; Provo, Utah
Feb 3, 1996		at No. 7 Utah	L 58–74	17–4 (7–4)	Jon M. Huntsman Center; Salt Lake City, Utah
Feb 10, 1996		UTEP	W 81–52	18–4 (8–4)	The Pit (17,008); Albuquerque, New Mexico
Feb 17, 1996		Wyoming	W 70–69	19–4 (9–4)	The Pit (17,414); Albuquerque, New Mexico
Feb 19, 1996		Colorado State	W 78–66	20–4 (10–4)	The Pit (15,897); Albuquerque, New Mexico
Feb 22, 1996		at San Diego State	W 83–78	21–4 (11–4)	San Diego Sports Arena (3,572); San Diego, California
Feb 24, 1996		at Hawaii	W 88–79	22–4 (12–4)	Stan Sheriff Center (8,655); Honolulu, Hawaii
Feb 29, 1996		Air Force	W 67–55	23–4 (13–4)	The Pit (17,228); Albuquerque, New Mexico
Mar 2, 1996		Fresno State	W 86–84	24–4 (14–4)	The Pit (18,018); Albuquerque, New Mexico
WAC tournament
Mar 7, 1996*	(2)	(7) San Diego State; Quarterfinals	W 94–75	25–4	The Pit (9,326); Albuquerque, New Mexico
Mar 8, 1996*	(2)	(3) Fresno State; Semifinals	W 104–99 ^{3OT}	26–4	The Pit (12,222); Albuquerque, New Mexico
Mar 9, 1996*	(2)	(1) No. 10 Utah; Championship	W 64–60	27–4	The Pit (13,503); Albuquerque, New Mexico
NCAA tournament
Mar 15, 1996*	(7 E) No. 23	vs. (10 E) Kansas State; First round	W 69–48	28–4	Richmond Coliseum (11,859); Richmond, Virginia
Mar 17, 1996*	(7 E) No. 23	vs. (2 E) No. 4 Georgetown; Second round	L 62–73	28–5	Richmond Coliseum (11,859); Richmond, Virginia
*Non-conference game. ^{#}Rankings from AP poll. (#) Tournament seedings in parentheses. E=East.
