= 1995–96 Tulsa Golden Hurricane men's basketball team =

American college basketball season

1995–96 Tulsa Golden Hurricane men's basketball

MVC tournament champions

NCAA tournament, First round
- Conference: Missouri Valley Conference
- Record: 22–8 (12–6 MVC)
- Head coach: Steve Robinson (1st season)
- Assistant coaches: Coleman Crawford (1st season); Jim Platt (2nd season)
- Home arena: Tulsa Convention Center

1995–96 Missouri Valley Conference men's basketball standings
| | Conf. | | | | Overall |
| Team | W | | L | PCT | W | | L | PCT |
|---|---|---|---|---|---|---|---|---|
| Bradley | 15 | – | 3 | .833 | 22 | – | 8 | .733 |
| Illinois State | 13 | – | 5 | .722 | 22 | – | 12 | .647 |
| Tulsa † | 12 | – | 6 | .667 | 22 | – | 8 | .733 |
| Southwest Missouri State | 11 | – | 7 | .611 | 16 | – | 12 | .571 |
| Creighton | 9 | – | 9 | .500 | 14 | – | 15 | .483 |
| Evansville | 9 | – | 9 | .500 | 13 | – | 14 | .481 |
| Northern Iowa | 8 | – | 10 | .444 | 14 | – | 13 | .519 |
| Drake | 8 | – | 10 | .444 | 12 | – | 15 | .444 |
| Indiana State | 6 | – | 12 | .333 | 10 | – | 16 | .385 |
| Wichita State | 4 | – | 14 | .222 | 8 | – | 21 | .276 |
| Southern Illinois | 4 | – | 14 | .222 | 11 | – | 18 | .379 |
† 1996 MVC tournament winner Rankings from AP Poll

The 1995–96 Tulsa Golden Hurricane men's basketball team represented the University of Tulsa as a member of the Missouri Valley Conference during the 1995–96 college basketball season. The Golden Hurricane played their home games at the Tulsa Convention Center. Led by first-year head coach Steve Robinson, they finished the season 22–8 overall and 12–6 in conference play to finish third in the MVC standings. Tulsa won the MVC tournament to receive the conference's automatic bid to the NCAA tournament, the team was defeated by Louisville, 82–80 in OT, in the opening round.

== Roster ==
1995–96 Tulsa Golden Hurricane men's basketball team
Players
Coaches

| Pos. | # | Name | Height | Weight | Year | Hometown |
|---|---|---|---|---|---|---|
| G | 21 | Shea Seals | 6 ft 5 in (1.96 m) | 200 lb (91 kg) | Jr | Tulsa, Oklahoma |
| F/C | 51 | Michael Ruffin | 6 ft 9 in (2.06 m) | 235 lb (107 kg) | Fr | Denver, Colorado |

Head coach

Steve Robinson

Assistant coach(es)

- Coleman Crawford (North Alabama)
- Jim Platt (Concordia (IL))

Legend

- (C) Team captain
- (S) Suspended
- (I) Ineligible
- (W) Walk-on
- Injured
- Current redshirt

== Schedule and results ==
| Date time, TV | Rank^{#} | Opponent^{#} | Result | Record | Site (attendance) city, state |
Regular season
| Dec 2, 1995* | | North Carolina A&T | W 100–51 | 1–0 | Tulsa Convention Center (6,127); Tulsa, Oklahoma |
| Dec 4, 1995* | | at Western Kentucky | W 73–65 | 2–0 | E. A. Diddle Arena (5,800); Bowling Green, Kentucky |
| Dec 9, 1995* | | at Temple | W 64–60 | 3–0 | McGonigle Hall (3,439); Philadelphia, Pennsylvania |
| Dec 17, 1995* | | Prairie View | W 141–50 | 4–0 | Tulsa Convention Center (5,988); Tulsa, Oklahoma |
| Dec 20, 1995* | | New Mexico State | W 73–57 | 5–0 | Tulsa Convention Center (6,827); Tulsa, Oklahoma |
| Dec 30, 1995* | No. 25 | at Oral Roberts | L 78–90 | 5–1 | Mabee Center (10,575); Tulsa, Oklahoma |
| Jan 2, 1996* | | Oklahoma State | W 57–53 | 6–1 | Tulsa Convention Center (8,759); Tulsa, Oklahoma |
| Jan 6, 1996 | | at Evansville | W 67–57 | 7–1 (1–0) | Roberts Municipal Stadium (10,051); Evansville, Indiana |
| Jan 8, 1996* | | UAB | W 70–55 | 8–1 | Tulsa Convention Center (6,162); Tulsa, Oklahoma |
| Jan 11, 1996 | | Drake | W 86–64 | 9–1 (2–0) | Tulsa Convention Center (6,611); Tulsa, Oklahoma |
| Jan 14, 1996 | | Illinois State | L 71–74 | 9–2 (2–1) | Tulsa Convention Center (7,466); Tulsa, Oklahoma |
| Jan 17, 1996 | | at Creighton | L 59–72 | 9–3 (2–2) | Omaha Civic Auditorium (3,790); Omaha, Nebraska |
| Jan 20, 1996 | | at SW Missouri State | W 75–65 | 10–3 (3–2) | Hammons Student Center (8,479); Springfield, Missouri |
| Jan 24, 1996 | | Creighton | W 55–52 | 11–3 (4–2) | Tulsa Convention Center (6,512); Tulsa, Oklahoma |
| Jan 27, 1996 | | at Drake | W 79–73 | 12–3 (5–2) | Knapp Center (5,218); Des Moines, Iowa |
| Jan 29, 1996 | | at Northern Iowa | W 89–79 | 13–3 (6–2) | UNI-Dome (2,273); Cedar Falls, Iowa |
| Jan 31, 1996 | | SW Missouri State | L 61–66 | 13–4 (6–3) | Tulsa Convention Center (6,336); Tulsa, Oklahoma |
| Feb 4, 1996 | | at Bradley | L 72–85 ^{OT} | 13–5 (6–4) | Carver Arena (10,026); Peoria, Illinois |
| Feb 10, 1996 | | at Wichita State | W 75–47 | 14–5 (7–4) | Levitt Arena (6,124); Wichita, Kansas |
| Feb 12, 1996 | | Evansville | W 74–53 | 15–5 (8–4) | Tulsa Convention Center (6,097); Tulsa, Oklahoma |
| Feb 14, 1996 | | at Southern Illinois | W 84–75 ^{OT} | 16–5 (9–4) | SIU Arena (3,418); Carbondale, Illinois |
| Feb 17, 1996 | | Bradley | L 73–74 ^{OT} | 16–6 (9–5) | Tulsa Convention Center (7,056); Tulsa, OK |
| Feb 19, 1996 | | Indiana State | W 111–75 | 17–6 (10–5) | Tulsa Convention Center (6,321); Tulsa, OK |
| Feb 21, 1996 | | at Illinois State | L 64–69 | 17–7 (10–6) | Redbird Arena (7,807); Normal, Illinois |
| Feb 24, 1996 | | Wichita State | W 72–66 | 18–7 (11–5) | Tulsa Convention Center (7,609); Tulsa, OK |
| Feb 26, 1996* | | Northern Iowa | W 95–88 | 19–7 (12–6) | Tulsa Convention Center (6,498); Tulsa, Oklahoma |
MVC tournament
| Mar 2, 1996* | (3) | vs. (6) Evansville; Quarterfinals | W 65–55 | 20–7 | Kiel Center (8,976); St. Louis, Missouri |
| Mar 3, 1996* | (3) | vs. (2) Illinois State; Semifinals | W 69–52 | 21–7 | Kiel Center (12,681); St. Louis, Missouri |
| Mar 4, 1996* | (3) | vs. (1) Bradley; Championship | W 60–46 | 22–7 | Kiel Center (10,141); St. Louis, Missouri |
NCAA tournament
| Mar 15, 1996* | (11 MW) | vs. (6 MW) No. 24 Louisville; First Round | L 80–82 ^{OT} | 22–8 | Bradley Center (18,000); Milwaukee, Wisconsin |
*Non-conference game. ^{#}Rankings from AP poll. (#) Tournament seedings in parentheses. MW=Midwest. All times are in Central.
