= 1995–96 Drake Bulldogs men's basketball team =

American college basketball season

1995–96 Drake Bulldogs men's basketball
- Conference: Missouri Valley Conference
- Record: 12–15 (8–10 MVC)
- Head coach: Rudy Washington (6th season)
- Home arena: Knapp Center

1995–96 Missouri Valley Conference men's basketball standings
	Conf.				Overall
Team	W		L	PCT	W		L	PCT
Bradley	15	–	3	.833	22	–	8	.733
Illinois State	13	–	5	.722	22	–	12	.647
Tulsa †	12	–	6	.667	22	–	8	.733
Southwest Missouri State	11	–	7	.611	16	–	12	.571
Creighton	9	–	9	.500	14	–	15	.483
Evansville	9	–	9	.500	13	–	14	.481
Northern Iowa	8	–	10	.444	14	–	13	.519
Drake	8	–	10	.444	12	–	15	.444
Indiana State	6	–	12	.333	10	–	16	.385
Wichita State	4	–	14	.222	8	–	21	.276
Southern Illinois	4	–	14	.222	11	–	18	.379
† 1996 MVC tournament winner Rankings from AP Poll

The 1995–96 Drake Bulldogs men's basketball team represented Drake University during the 1995–96 NCAA Division I men's basketball season. The Bulldogs, led by 6th-year head coach Rudy Washington, played their home games at the Knapp Center in Des Moines, Iowa, as members of the Missouri Valley Conference (MVC).

The Bulldogs were well-positioned in the conference standings at the halfway point of the MVC schedule, but hit a wall down the stretch in losing nine of their final 11 games. Drake finished the season with a record of 12–15 (8–10 MVC). Despite slight improvement in record during his tenure, Coach Washington never achieved a season above .500 and resigned as head coach on March 1, 1996. He would be succeeded by Kurt Kanaskie.

== Roster ==
1995–96 Drake Bulldogs men's basketball team
Players
Coaches

Pos.	#	Name	Height	Weight	Year	Previous school	Hometown
F	3	Tyrone Hicks	6 ft 6 in (1.98 m)	220 lb (100 kg)	Sr		Belleville, MI
G	5	Rudy Washington	6 ft 4 in (1.93 m)	215 lb (98 kg)	Sr	Carson	Los Angeles, CA
G	10	B. J. Windhorst	6 ft 4 in (1.93 m)	190 lb (86 kg)	Sr	IWCC; Clarinda	Clarinda, IA
G	12	Robert Foster	6 ft 5 in (1.96 m)	205 lb (93 kg)	Jr		Los Angeles, CA
G	20	Dan Knuckey	6 ft 2 in (1.88 m)	188 lb (85 kg)	Sr	Alleman Catholic	Rock Island, IL
G	21	Kory Petzenhauser	6 ft 4 in (1.93 m)	187 lb (85 kg)	Fr		Lake City, IA
G	22	Lynnrick Rogers	6 ft 2 in (1.88 m)	179 lb (81 kg)	Jr		Dawson, GA
G	23	Chris King	5 ft 11 in (1.8 m)	165 lb (75 kg)	Jr		Missouri City, TX
G	24	Shawn Caracoza	6 ft 1 in (1.85 m)	180 lb (82 kg)	Jr	Artesia	Lakewood, CA
C	25	Ken Maxey	6 ft 8 in (2.03 m)	255 lb (116 kg)	Sr		Bellflower, CA
F	40	Bruce Overton	6 ft 8 in (2.03 m)	212 lb (96 kg)	Sr	Indianola	Indianola, IA
F	42	Rashaad Thomas	6 ft 6 in (1.98 m)	205 lb (93 kg)	So		Las Vegas, NV

Head coach

- Rudy Washington

Assistant coach(es)

Legend

- (C) Team captain
- (S) Suspended
- (I) Ineligible
- (W) Walk-on
- Injured
- Current redshirt

Roster

== Schedule and results ==
Date time, TV	Rank^{#}	Opponent^{#}	Result	Record	High points	High rebounds	High assists	Site (attendance) city, state
Non-conference regular season
Nov 24, 1995*		Liberty	W 80–59	1–0	–	–	–	Knapp Center; Des Moines, Iowa
Nov 28, 1995*		at No. 11 Iowa; Iowa Big Four	L 66–98	1–1	20 – Windhorst	5 – Hicks	3 – Tied	Carver-Hawkeye Arena (15,500); Iowa City, Iowa
Dec 2, 1995*		at Loyola–Chicago	W 70–62	2–1	–	–	–	Alumni Gym; Chicago, Illinois
Dec 4, 1995*		at No. 14 Utah	L 50–86	2–2	8 – Maxey	–	–	Jon M. Huntsman Center; Salt Lake City, Utah
Dec 6, 1995*		Iowa State; Iowa Big Four	L 62–65	2–3	–	–	–	Knapp Center; Des Moines, Iowa
Dec 9, 1995*		Samford	W 77–64	3–3	–	–	–	Knapp Center; Des Moines, Iowa
Dec 16, 1995*		Baylor	L 75–78	3–4	–	–	–	Knapp Center; Des Moines, Iowa
Dec 30, 1995*		at UTSA	W 94–86	4–4	–	–	–	Convocation Center; San Antonio, Texas
MVC regular season
Jan 4, 1996		Wichita State	W 66–62	5–4 (1–0)	–	–	–	Knapp Center; Des Moines, Iowa
Jan 8, 1996*		Creighton	W 59–56	6–4 (2–0)	14 – Windhorst	7 – Tied	3 – Petzenhauser	Knapp Center; Des, Moines, Iowa
Jan 11, 1996		at Tulsa	L 64–86	6–5 (2–1)	–	–	–	Tulsa Convention Center; Tulsa, Oklahoma
Jan 13, 1996		at Wichita State	W 64–55 ^{OT}	7–5 (3–1)	–	–	–	Levitt Arena; Wichita, Kansas
Jan 16, 1996		Indiana State	W 81–65	8–5 (4–1)	–	–	–	Knapp Center; Des Moines, Iowa
Jan 21, 1996		at Northern Iowa; Rivalry / Iowa Big Four	L 76–82	8–6 (4–2)	–	–	–	UNI-Dome; Cedar Falls, Iowa
Jan 23, 1996		Southern Illinois	W 87–67	9–6 (5–2)	21 – Windhorst	11 – Maxey	5 – Knuckey	Knapp Center; Des Moines, Iowa
Jan 25, 1996		at Illinois State	W 72–68	10–6 (6–2)	–	–	–	Redbird Arena; Normal, Illinois
Jan 27, 1996		Tulsa	L 73–79	10–7 (6–3)	–	–	–	Knapp Center; Des Moines, Iowa
Jan 31, 1996		at Bradley	L 60–77	10–8 (6–4)	–	–	–	Carver Arena; Peoria, Illinois
Feb 3, 1996		Evansville	W 65–61	11–8 (7–4)	–	–	–	Knapp Center; Des Moines, Iowa
Feb 8, 1996		at Indiana State	L 83–85	11–9 (7–5)	–	–	–	Hulman Center; Terre Haute, Indiana
Feb 10, 1996		at Evansville	L 69–80	11–10 (7–6)	–	–	–	Roberts Municipal Stadium; Evansville, Indiana
Feb 14, 1996		Illinois State	L 52–74	11–11 (7–7)	–	–	–	Knapp Center; Des Moines, Iowa
Feb 17, 1996		at Southern Illinois	W 71–68	12–11 (8–7)	26 – Windhorst	7 – Tied	8 – Knuckey	SIU Arena; Carbondale, Illinois
Feb 19, 1996		Southwest Missouri State	L 81–84	12–12 (8–8)	–	–	–	Knapp Center; Des Moines, Iowa
Feb 24, 1996		Northern Iowa; Rivalry / Iowa Big Four	L 66–83	12–13 (8–9)	–	–	–	Knapp Center; Des Moines, Iowa
Feb 26, 1996		at Creighton	L 62–76	12–14 (8–10)	14 – Windhorst	9 – Hicks	4 – Knuckey	Omaha Civic Auditorium; Omaha, Nebraska
MVC Tournament
Mar 2, 1996*		vs. Bradley; Quarterfinals	L 51–64	12–15	–	–	–	Kiel Center; St. Louis, Missouri
*Non-conference game. ^{#}Rankings from AP Poll. (#) Tournament seedings in parentheses. All times are in Central Time.
