= 1995–96 Nebraska Cornhuskers men's basketball team =

American college basketball season

1995–96 Nebraska Cornhuskers men's basketball

NIT champions Big Island Invitational Champions
- Conference: Big Eight Conference
- Record: 21–14 (4–10 Big Eight)
- Head coach: Danny Nee (10th season)
- Assistant coaches: Jimmy Williams; Scott Howard; Bill Johnson
- Home arena: Bob Devaney Sports Center

1995–96 Big Eight Conference men's basketball standings
| | Conf. | | | | Overall |
| Team | W | | L | PCT | W | | L | PCT |
|---|---|---|---|---|---|---|---|---|
| No. 4 Kansas | 12 | – | 2 | .857 | 29 | – | 5 | .853 |
| No. 17 Iowa State † | 9 | – | 5 | .643 | 24 | – | 9 | .727 |
| Oklahoma (Note: Adjusted from 17–13 as Purdue forfeited 18 wins) | 8 | – | 6 | .571 | 18 | – | 12 | .600 |
| Kansas State | 7 | – | 7 | .500 | 17 | – | 12 | .586 |
| Oklahoma State | 7 | – | 7 | .500 | 17 | – | 10 | .630 |
| Missouri | 6 | – | 8 | .429 | 18 | – | 15 | .545 |
| Nebraska | 4 | – | 10 | .286 | 21 | – | 14 | .600 |
| Colorado | 3 | – | 11 | .214 | 9 | – | 18 | .333 |
† 1996 Big Eight tournament winner Rankings from AP Poll

The 1995–96 Nebraska Cornhuskers men's basketball team represented the University of Nebraska–Lincoln during the 1995–96 college basketball season. Led by head coach Danny Nee (10th season), the Cornhuskers competed in the Big Eight Conference and played their home games at the Bob Devaney Sports Center. They finished with a record of 21–14 overall and 4–10 in Big Eight Conference play. After placing 7th in the conference standings, and losing in the quarterfinals of the final Big Eight tournament, Nebraska won the 1996 National Invitation Tournament.

== Roster ==
1995–96 Nebraska Cornhuskers men's basketball team
Players
Coaches

| Pos. | # | Name | Height | Weight | Year | Previous school | Hometown |
|---|---|---|---|---|---|---|---|
| F | 3 | Chester Surles | 6 ft 7 in (2.01 m) | 210 lb (95 kg) | So | Buena Vista | Saginaw, MI |
| C | 4 | Chris Sallee | 6 ft 10 in (2.08 m) | 216 lb (98 kg) | Sr | Horizon | Scottsdale, AZ |
| G | 10 | Tyronn Lue | 6 ft 0 in (1.83 m) | 165 lb (75 kg) | Fr | Raytown | Mexico, MO |
| G | 12 | Tom Wald | 6 ft 0 in (1.83 m) | 192 lb (87 kg) | Sr | Park Center | Brooklyn Park, MN |
| F | 13 | Bernard Garner | 6 ft 7 in (2.01 m) | 225 lb (102 kg) | Jr | Many | Many, LA |
| G | 21 | Erick Strickland | 6 ft 3 in (1.91 m) | 200 lb (91 kg) | Sr | Bellevue West | Bellevue, NE |
| G | 24 | Jaron Boone | 6 ft 6 in (1.98 m) | 195 lb (88 kg) | Sr | Skyline | Salt Lake City, UT |
| G | 30 | Jason Glock | 6 ft 5 in (1.96 m) | 202 lb (92 kg) | Sr | Wahoo | Wahoo, NE |
| F | 31 | Chad Ideus | 6 ft 7 in (2.01 m) | 216 lb (98 kg) | Fr | Adams | Adams, NE |
| C | 32 | Mikki Moore | 6 ft 11 in (2.11 m) | 195 lb (88 kg) | Jr | Blacksburg | Gaffney, SC |
| C | 33 | Venson Hamilton | 6 ft 9 in (2.06 m) | 220 lb (100 kg) | Fr | Oak Hill Academy | Forest City, NC |
| F | 43 | Terrance Badgett | 6 ft 6 in (1.98 m) | 227 lb (103 kg) | Sr | Omaha South | Omaha, NE |
| F | 44 | Andy Markowski | 6 ft 8 in (2.03 m) | 205 lb (93 kg) | RS Fr | Ord | Ord, NE |
| F | 54 | Leif Nelson | 6 ft 11 in (2.11 m) | 290 lb (132 kg) | RS Fr | Arlington | Riverside, CA |

Head coach

Danny Nee

Assistant coach(es)

- Jimmy Williams
- Scott Howard
- Bill Johnson

Legend

- (C) Team captain
- (S) Suspended
- (I) Ineligible
- (W) Walk-on
- Injured
- Current redshirt

Roster
Last update: March 29, 2020

== Schedule and results ==
| Date time, TV | Rank^{#} | Opponent^{#} | Result | Record | Site city, state |
Regular season
| Nov 24, 1995* | | vs. Toledo; Big Island Invitational | W 72–59 | 1–0 | Afook-Chinen Civic Auditorium; Hilo, Hawaii |
| Nov 25, 1995* | | vs. Oregon; Big Island Invitational | W 114–106 ^{OT} | 2–0 | Afook-Chinen Civic Auditorium; Hilo, Hawaii |
| Nov 26, 1995* | | vs. Minnesota; Big Island Invitational | W 96–85 | 3–0 | Afook-Chinen Civic Auditorium; Hilo, Hawaii |
| Dec 1, 1995* | | Georgia Southern; Ameritas Classic | W 82–59 | 4–0 | Bob Devaney Sports Center; Lincoln, Nebraska |
| Dec 2, 1995* | | Grambling; Ameritas Classic | W 96–80 | 5–0 | Bob Devaney Sports Center; Lincoln, Nebraska |
| Dec 6, 1995* | | at Creighton; Rivalry | W 88–67 | 6–0 | Omaha Civic Auditorium; Omaha, NE |
| Dec 9, 1995* | | at Minnesota | L 80–91 | 6–1 | Williams Arena; Minneapolis, Minnesota |
| Dec 16, 1995* | | Northern Iowa | L 104–109 | 6–2 | Bob Devaney Sports Center; Lincoln, Nebraska |
| Dec 18, 1995* | | Northeastern Illinois | W 94–76 | 7–2 | Bob Devaney Sports Center; Lincoln, Nebraska |
| Dec 21, 1995* | | Delaware State | W 88–41 | 8–2 | Bob Devaney Sports Center; Lincoln, Nebraska |
| Dec 29, 1995* | | vs. Oregon; Far West Classic | W 99–76 | 9–2 | Rose Garden Arena; Portland, Oregon |
| Dec 30, 1995* | | vs. No. 17 Mississippi State; Far West Classic | L 66–69 | 9–3 | Rose Garden Arena; Portland, Oregon |
| Jan 3, 1996* | | No. 23 Texas | W 85–69 | 10–3 | Bob Devaney Sports Center; Lincoln, Nebraska |
| Jan 6, 1996* | | Long Beach State | W 69–68 | 11–3 | Bob Devaney Sports Center; Lincoln, Nebraska |
| Jan 10, 1996 | | Colorado | W 79–74 | 12–3 (1–0) | Bob Devaney Sports Center; Lincoln, Nebraska |
| Jan 13, 1996 | | at Oklahoma | L 100–117 ^{3OT} | 12–4 (1–1) | Lloyd Noble Center; Norman, Oklahoma |
| Jan 17, 1996* | | Missouri-Kansas City | W 87–69 | 13–4 | Bob Devaney Sports Center; Lincoln, Nebraska |
| Jan 20, 1996 | | at Oklahoma State | W 66–57 | 14–4 (2–1) | Gallagher-Iba Arena; Stillwater, Oklahoma |
| Jan 24, 1996 | | Missouri | W 76–58 | 15–4 (3–1) | Bob Devaney Sports Center; Lincoln, Nebraska |
| Jan 28, 1996 | | No. 3 Kansas | L 73–88 | 15–5 (3–2) | Bob Devaney Sports Center; Lincoln, Nebraska |
| Jan 31, 1996 | | at Kansas State | L 68–77 | 15–6 (3–3) | Bramlage Coliseum; Manhattan, Kansas |
| Feb 3, 1996 | | Iowa State | L 65–75 | 15–7 (3–4) | Bob Devaney Sports Center; Lincoln, Nebraska |
| Feb 7, 1996 | | at Missouri | L 98–99 | 15–8 (3–5) | Hearnes Center; Columbia, Missouri |
| Feb 10, 1996 | | at No. 21 Iowa State | L 59–74 | 15–9 (3–6) | Hilton Coliseum; Ames, Iowa |
| Feb 17, 1996 | | Oklahoma State | L 57–72 | 15–10 (3–7) | Bob Devaney Sports Center; Lincoln, Nebraska |
| Feb 19, 1996 | | at No. 5 Kansas | L 71–81 | 15–11 (3–8) | Allen Fieldhouse; Lawrence, Kansas |
| Feb 25, 1996 | | Oklahoma | L 76–80 ^{OT} | 15–12 (3–9) | Bob Devaney Sports Center; Lincoln, Nebraska |
| Feb 28, 1996 | | at Colorado | L 64–78 | 15–13 (3–10) | CU Events/Conference Center; Boulder, Colorado |
| Mar 3, 1996 | | Kansas State | W 70–66 | 16–13 (4–10) | Bob Devaney Sports Center; Lincoln, Nebraska |
Big Eight tournament
| Mar 8, 1996* | (7) | vs. (2) No. 23 Iowa State | L 60–62 | 16–14 | Kemper Arena; Kansas City, Missouri |
National Invitation Tournament
| Mar 14, 1996* | | at Colorado State; NIT First Round | W 91–83 | 17–14 | Moby Arena; Fort Collins, Colorado |
| Mar 19, 1996* | | Washington State; NIT Second Round | W 82–73 | 18–14 | Bob Devaney Sports Center; Lincoln, Nebraska |
| Mar 22, 1996* | | at Fresno State; NIT Quarterfinals | W 83–71 | 19–14 | Selland Arena; Fresno, California |
| Mar 26, 1996* | | vs. Tulane; NIT Semifinals | W 90–78 | 20–14 | Madison Square Garden; New York, New York |
| Mar 28, 1996* | | vs. Saint Joseph's; NIT Championship | W 60–56 | 21–14 | Madison Square Garden; New York, New York |
*Non-conference game. ^{#}Rankings from AP poll. (#) Tournament seedings in parentheses. All times are in Central Time.
