= 1995–96 Illinois State Redbirds men's basketball team =

American college basketball season

1995–96 Illinois State Redbirds men's basketball

NIT, Quarterfinal
- Conference: Missouri Valley Conference
- Record: 22–12 (13–5 MVC)
- Head coach: Kevin Stallings (3rd season)
- Assistant coaches: King Rice; Tom Richardson; Jeff Wulbrun
- Home arena: Redbird Arena

1995–96 Missouri Valley Conference men's basketball standings
	Conf.				Overall
Team	W		L	PCT	W		L	PCT
Bradley	15	–	3	.833	22	–	8	.733
Illinois State	13	–	5	.722	22	–	12	.647
Tulsa †	12	–	6	.667	22	–	8	.733
Southwest Missouri State	11	–	7	.611	16	–	12	.571
Creighton	9	–	9	.500	14	–	15	.483
Evansville	9	–	9	.500	13	–	14	.481
Northern Iowa	8	–	10	.444	14	–	13	.519
Drake	8	–	10	.444	12	–	15	.444
Indiana State	6	–	12	.333	10	–	16	.385
Wichita State	4	–	14	.222	8	–	21	.276
Southern Illinois	4	–	14	.222	11	–	18	.379
† 1996 MVC tournament winner Rankings from AP Poll

The 1995–96 Illinois State Redbirds men's basketball team represented Illinois State University during the 1995–96 NCAA Division I men's basketball season. The Redbirds, led by third year head coach Kevin Stallings, played their home games at Redbird Arena and were a member of the Missouri Valley Conference.

The Redbirds finished the season 22–12, 13–5 in conference play to finish in second place. They were the number two seed for the Missouri Valley Conference tournament. They won their quarterfinal game versus the University of Northern Iowa and lost their semifinal game versus the University of Tulsa.

The Redbirds received an invitation to the 1996 National Invitation Tournament. They beat Mount St. Mary's University in the first round, the University of Wisconsin in the second round, and were defeated by Tulane University in the quarterfinal round.

== Roster ==
1995–96 Illinois State Redbirds men's basketball team
Players
Coaches

Pos.	#	Name	Height	Weight	Year	Hometown
G	25	Antonio Cooper	5 ft 9 in (1.75 m)	—	Sr	Phoenix, IL
G	3	Maurice Trotter	6 ft 4 in (1.93 m)	—	Sr	Lawrence, KS
F	13	Kenny Wright	6 ft 5 in (1.96 m)	—	Sr	Indianapolis, IN
F		John Brown	6 ft 4 in (1.93 m)	—	Jr
C	35	Rob Gibbons	6 ft 10 in (2.08 m)	—	RS So	Rockaway, NJ
G	33	Steve Hansell	6 ft 4 in (1.93 m)	—	So	Birmingham, England
F	44	Dan Muller	6 ft 6 in (1.98 m)	—	So	Lafayette, IN
G	15	Jamar Smiley	5 ft 11 in (1.8 m)	—	So	West Hempstead, NY
F	23	Kenneth Pierson	6 ft 8 in (2.03 m)	—	RS Fr	Conroe, TX
C	32	LeRoy Watkins	6 ft 7 in (2.01 m)	—	RS Fr	Chicago, IL
G	24	Kyle Cartmill	6 ft 1 in (1.85 m)	—	Fr	Quincy, IL
G	11	Rick Garrett	6 ft 1 in (1.85 m)	—	Fr	Centralia, IL
F	42	Rico Hill	6 ft 6 in (1.98 m)	—	Fr	Calumet City, IL

Head coach

- Kevin Stallings (Purdue)

Assistant coach(es)

- King Rice (North Carolina)
- Tom Richardson (Saint Xavier)
- Jeff Wulbrun (Cal State Fullerton)

Legend

- (C) Team captain
- (S) Suspended
- (I) Ineligible
- (W) Walk-on
- Injured
- Current redshirt

== Schedule ==
Date time, TV	Rank^{#}	Opponent^{#}	Result	Record	High points	High rebounds	High assists	Site (attendance) city, state
Exhibition Season
November 12, 1995*		Poland–Select 10.5; Basket Club of Poznan	W 78–64		17 – Cooper	14 – Muller	–	Redbird Arena; Normal, IL
November 20, 1995*		Converse All–Stars	W 104–75		17 – Trotter, Watkins, Hill	15 – Hill	6 – Trotter	Redbird Arena; Normal, IL
Regular Season
November 24, 1995*		vs. James Madison; San Juan Shootout [Quarterfinal]	L 85–86	0–1	–	–	–	Eugene Guerra Sports Complex (250); San Juan, PR
November 25, 1995*		vs. La Salle; San Juan Shootout [Consolation Semifinal]	W 72–65	1–1	–	–	–	Eugene Guerra Sports Complex (250); San Juan, PR
November 26, 1995*		at American (Puerto Rico); San Juan Shootout [Fifth Place]	W 79–77	2–1	–	–	–	Eugene Guerra Sports Complex (500); San Juan, PR
December 2, 1995*		Duquesne	L 65–77	2–2	–	–	–	Redbird Arena (6,588); Normal, IL
December 6, 1995*		at Ohio	W 66–65	3–2	–	–	–	Convocation Center (4,608); Athens, OH
December 9, 1995*		Fairleigh Dickinson	W 79–58	4–2	–	–	–	Redbird Arena (7,294); Normal, IL
December 18, 1995*		Santa Clara	L 78–80	4–3	–	–	–	Redbird Arena (7,883); Normal, IL
December 21, 1995*		at North Carolina–Wilmington	W 69–57	5–3	–	–	–	Raiford Graham Trask Coliseum (2,878); Wilmington, NC
December 23, 1995*; 12:00 pm		at Virginia Commonwealth	L 72–74	5–4	–	–	–	Richmond Coliseum (3,031); Richmond, VA
December 30, 1995*		East Carolina	W 64–52	6–4	–	–	–	Redbird Arena (7,086); Normal, IL
January 3, 1996		Indiana State	W 74–64	7–4 (1–0)	–	–	–	Redbird Arena (6,842); Normal, IL
January 7, 1996		at Southern Illinois	L 75–97	7–5 (1–1)	20 – Trotter	7 – Muller	4 – Smiley	SIU Arena (3,422); Carbondale, IL
January 11, 1996		Southwest Missouri State	W 86–79	8–5 (2–1)	–	–	–	Redbird Arena (7,422); Normal, IL
January 14, 1996; 8:05 pm, Prime Network/ SportsChannel		at Tulsa	W 74–71	9–5 (3–1)	–	–	–	Tulsa Convention Center (7,466); Tulsa, OK
January 16, 1996; 7:30 pm		at Wichita State	W 61–59	10–5 (4–1)	19 – Trotter	6 – Hill	5 – Smiley	Henry Levitt Arena (5,161); Wichita, KS
January 20, 1996; WMBD		Bradley	W 77–72	11–5 (5–1)	–	–	–	Redbird Arena (10,310); Normal, IL
January 22, 1996		at Southwest Missouri State	W 76–69	12–5 (6–1)	–	–	–	John Q. Hammons Student Center (7,037); Springfield, MO
January 25, 1996		Drake	L 68–72	12–6 (6–2)	–	–	–	Redbird Arena (6,862); Normal, IL
January 27, 1996; 8:05 pm		Wichita State	W 74–57	13–6 (7–2)	18 – Muller	5 – Gibbons, Watkins	7 – Smiley	Redbird Arena (9,305); Normal, IL
January 30, 1996		at Evansville	W 73–69	14–6 (8–2)	–	–	–	Roberts Municipal Stadium (9,469); Evansville, IN
February 2, 1996*; 10:59 pm, ESPN		at No. 5 Cincinnati	L 57–91	14–7	–	–	–	Myrl H. Shoemaker Center (13,176); Cincinnati, OH
February 5, 1996		at Creighton	W 74–72	15–7 (9–2)	13 – Trotter	8 – Hill	3 – Smiley	Omaha Civic Auditorium (4,136); Omaha, NE
February 8, 1996		Northern Iowa	W 97–80	16–7 (10–2)	–	–	–	Redbird Arena (9,174); Normal, IL
February 11, 1996; 8:00 pm, Prime Network/ SportsChannel		Southern Illinois	L 71–74	16–8 (10–3)	18 – Trotter	7 – Trotter, Watkins	4 – Smiley	Redbird Arena (8,100); Normal, IL
February 14, 1996		at Drake	W 74–52	17–8 (11–3)	–	–	–	The Knapp Center (3,014); Des Moines, IA
February 18, 1996; 8:00 pm, Prime Network/ SportsChannel		Evansville	W 70–69	18–8 (12–3)	–	–	–	Redbird Arena (7,912); Normal, IL
February 21, 1996; 7:05 pm		Tulsa	W 69–64	19–8 (13–3)	–	–	–	Redbird Arena (7,807); Normal, IL
February 24, 1996; 1:00 pm, ESPN		at Bradley	L 64–65	19–9 (13–4)	–	–	–	Carver Arena (10,926); Peoria, IL
February 26, 1996		at Indiana State	L 60-64	19–10 (13–5)	–	–	–	Hulman Center (7,207); Terre Haute, IN
Diet Pepsi Missouri Valley Conference {MVC} tournament
March 2, 1996; 6:00 pm	(2)	vs. (7) Northern Iowa; Quarterfinal	W 64–58	20–10	18 – Trotter	7 – Smiley, Hill	8 – Smiley	Kiel Center (8,976); St. Louis, MO
March 3, 1996; 4:30 pm, ESPN2	(2)	vs. (3) Tulsa; Semifinal	L 52–69	20–11	18 – Muller	9 – Hill	4 – Smiley	Kiel Center (12,681); St. Louis, MO
National Invitation {NIT} tournament
March 13, 1996		Mount St. Mary's; First Round	W 73–49	21–11	18 – Trotter	13 – Muller	8 – Smiley	Redbird Arena (5,869); Normal, IL
March 18, 1996		at Wisconsin; Second Round	W 77–62	22–11	19 – Trotter	11 – Hill	7 – Smiley	Wisconsin Field House (11,111); Madison, WI
March 20, 1996; 8:00 pm, ESPN		at Tulane; Quarterfinal	L 72–83	22–12	14 – Trotter, Hill	7 – Muller	6 – Smiley	Avron B. Fogelman Arena (3,600); New Orleans, LA
*Non-conference game. ^{#}Rankings from AP Poll. (#) Tournament seedings in parentheses. All times are in Central Standard Time.
