= 1996 WAC men's basketball tournament =

- Classification: Division I
- Season: 1995–96
- Teams: 10
- Site: The Pit; Albuquerque, NM
- Champions: New Mexico (2nd title)
- Winning coach: Dave Bliss (2nd title)
- MVP: Kenny Thomas (New Mexico)

1995–96 WAC men's basketball standings
	Conf.				Overall
Team	W		L	PCT	W		L	PCT
No. 12 Utah	15	–	3	.833	27	–	7	.794
No. 23 New Mexico †	14	–	4	.778	28	–	5	.848
Fresno State	13	–	5	.722	22	–	11	.667
Colorado State	11	–	7	.611	18	–	12	.600
BYU	9	–	9	.500	15	–	13	.536
Wyoming	8	–	10	.444	14	–	15	.483
San Diego State	8	–	10	.444	15	–	14	.517
Hawaii	7	–	11	.389	10	–	18	.357
UTEP	4	–	14	.222	13	–	15	.464
Air Force	1	–	17	.056	5	–	23	.179
† 1996 WAC tournament winner Rankings from AP Poll

The 1996 Western Athletic Conference men's basketball tournament was held March 6–9 at The Pit at the University of New Mexico in Albuquerque, New Mexico.

Hosts New Mexico upset top-seeded, defending champions Utah in the championship game, 64–60, to clinch their second WAC men's tournament championship.

The Lobos, in turn, received an automatic bid to the 1996 NCAA Division I Tournament. They were joined in the tournament by WAC regular season champions Utah, who received an at-large bid.

Another important note, the Hawaii team would get a second chance and move on to face Utah in the Quarterfinals because UTEP forfeited due to an ineligible player.

== Format ==
No changes were made to the tournament format from the previous year. The top six teams received byes into the quarterfinal round, leaving the lowest four-seeded teams to play in the first round. Teams were seeded based on regular season conference records.

== Bracket ==
First round Wednesday, March 6
9	UTEP	77
8	Hawaii	69
7	San Diego State	80
10	Air Force	69

Quarterfinals; Thursday, March 7
1	#10 Utah	76
8	Hawaii	63
5	BYU	84
4	Colorado State	100
3	Fresno State	91
6	Wyoming	82
7	San Diego State	75
2	New Mexico	94

Semifinals; Friday, March 8
1	#10 Utah	71
4	Colorado State	69
3	Fresno State	99
2	New Mexico	104

Championship; Saturday, March 9
1	#10 Utah	60
2	New Mexico	64
