= 1995–96 Kansas Jayhawks men's basketball team =

American college basketball season

1995–96 Kansas Jayhawks men's basketball
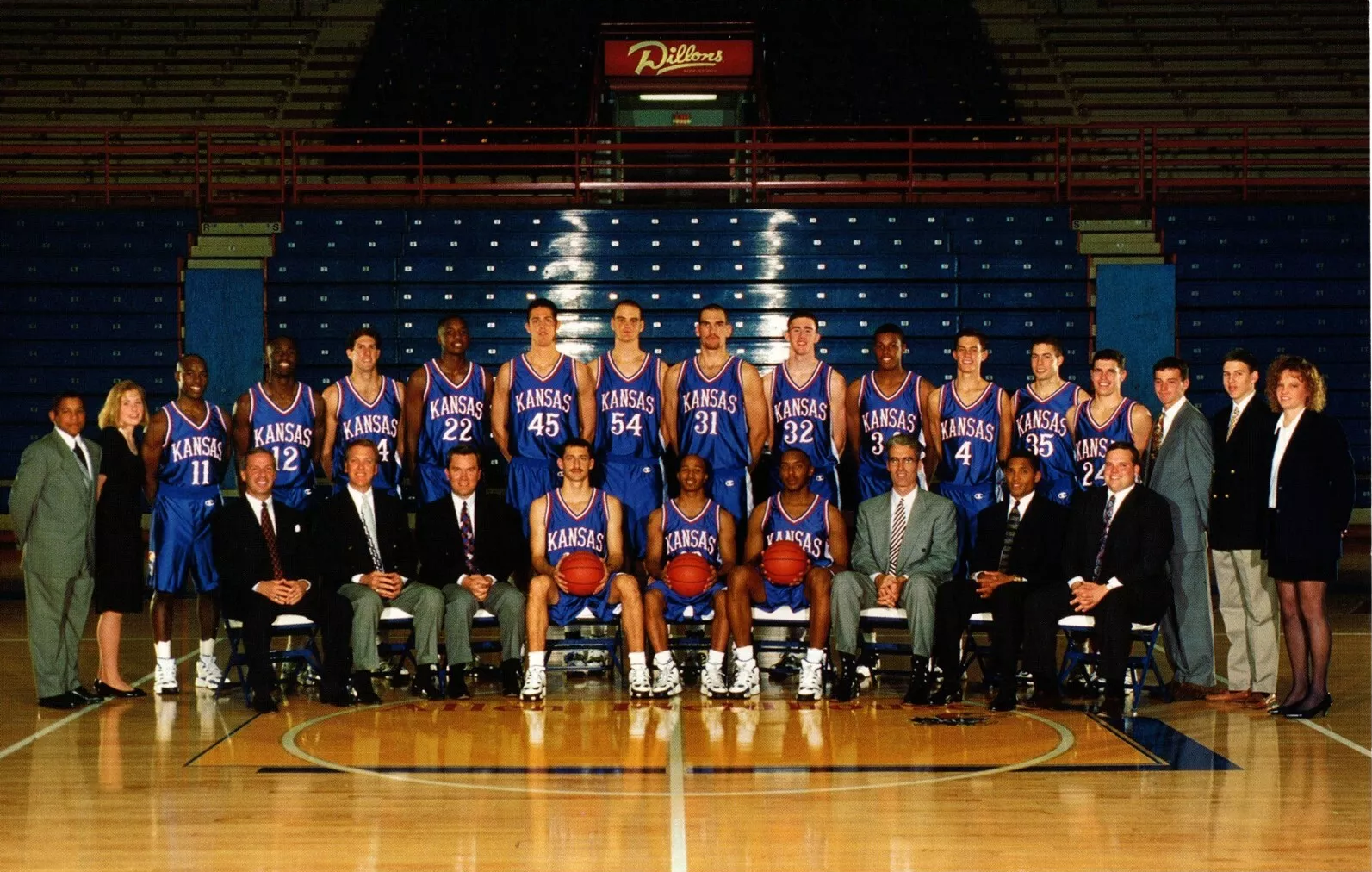

Big Eight regular season champions

NCAA men's Division I tournament, Elite Eight
- Conference: Big Eight Conference

Ranking
- Coaches: No. 5
- AP: No. 4
- Record: 29–5 (12–2 Big Eight)
- Head coach: Roy Williams (8th season)
- Assistant coaches: Matt Doherty (4th season); Neil Dougherty (1st season); Joe Holladay (2nd season)
- Captains: Sean Pearson; Calvin Rayford; T.J. Whatley
- Home arena: Allen Fieldhouse

1995–96 Big Eight Conference men's basketball standings
	Conf.				Overall
Team	W		L	PCT	W		L	PCT
No. 4 Kansas	12	–	2	.857	29	–	5	.853
No. 17 Iowa State †	9	–	5	.643	24	–	9	.727
Oklahoma (Note: Adjusted from 17–13 as Purdue forfeited 18 wins)	8	–	6	.571	18	–	12	.600
Kansas State	7	–	7	.500	17	–	12	.586
Oklahoma State	7	–	7	.500	17	–	10	.630
Missouri	6	–	8	.429	18	–	15	.545
Nebraska	4	–	10	.286	21	–	14	.600
Colorado	3	–	11	.214	9	–	18	.333
† 1996 Big Eight tournament winner Rankings from AP Poll

The 1995–96 Kansas Jayhawks men's basketball team represented the University of Kansas in the 1995–96 NCAA Division I men's basketball season, which was the Jayhawks' 98th basketball season. The head coach was Roy Williams, who served his 8th year at KU. The team played its home games in Allen Fieldhouse in Lawrence, Kansas. It was the Jayhawks final season in the Big Eight Conference, which dissolved at the end of the 1995–1996 school year.

== Roster ==
Name	#	Position	Height	Weight	Year	Home Town
Joel Branstrom	20	Forward	6-6	190	Senior(RS)	Half Moon Bay, California
Jerod Haase	35	Guard	6-3	185	Junior	South Lake Tahoe, California
Raef LaFrentz	45	Forward	6–11	220	Sophomore	Hampton, Iowa
C.B. McGrath	24	Guard	5-11	168	Sophomore	Topeka, Kansas
Sean Pearson	21	Forward	6–5	215	Senior	LaGrange, Illinois
Paul Pierce	34	Forward	6–6	220	Freshman	Inglewood, California
Scot Pollard	31	Center	6–10	250	Junior	San Diego, California
T.J. Pugh	32	Forward	6–9	215	Freshman	Omaha, Nebraska
Steve Ransom	44	Forward	6–5	210	Junior	Mission Viejo, California
Calvin Rayford	10	Guard	5-7	155	Senior	Milwaukee, Wisconsin
Ryan Robertson	4	Guard	6–5	170	Freshman	Saint Charles, Missouri
Billy Thomas	12	Forward/Guard	6–4	205	Sophomore	Shreveport, Louisiana
Jacque Vaughn	11	Guard	6–1	195	Junior	Pasadena, California
T.J. Whatley	14	Guard	6–4	180	Senior	Benton, Arkansas
B.J. Williams	22	Forward	6–8	205	Junior	Wichita, Kansas
Travis Williams	54	Center	7-0	265	Freshman(RS)	Rozel, Kansas

== Big Eight Conference standings ==
#	Team	Conference	Pct.	Overall	Pct.
1	Kansas	12-2	.857	29-5	.853
2	Iowa State	9-5	.643	24-9	.727
3	Oklahoma	8-6	.571	17-13	.567
4	Kansas State	7-7	.500	17-12	.586
5	Oklahoma State	7-7	.500	17-10	.630
6	Missouri	6-8	.429	18-15	.545
7	Nebraska	4-10	.289	21-14	.600
8	Colorado	3-11	.214	9-18	.333

== Schedule ==
Date time, TV	Rank^{#}	Opponent^{#}	Result	Record	Site city, state
11/25/1995*	No. 2	vs. No. 8 Utah; The Classic	W 79–68	1–0	Kemper Arena; Kansas City, MO
11/29/1995*	No. 2	vs. No. 15 Virginia; Great Eight	W 72–66	2–0	The Palace of Auburn Hills; Auburn Hills, MI
12/2/1995*	No. 2	No. 23 UCLA	W 85–70	3–0	Allen Fieldhouse; Lawrence, KS
12/7/1995*	No. 1	at Rice	W 83–63	4–0	Tudor Fieldhouse; Houston, TX
12/9/1995*	No. 1	at San Diego	W 101–71	5–0	San Diego Sports Arena; San Diego, CA
12/16/1995*	No. 1	vs. Indiana	W 91–83	6–0	Kemper Arena; Kansas City, MO
12/18/1995*	No. 1	Pittsburg State	W 103–48	7–0	Allen Fieldhouse; Lawrence, KS
12/22/1995*	No. 1	vs. Temple; Jimmy V Classic	L 66–74 ^{OT}	7–1	Meadowlands Arena; East Rutherford, NJ
1/2/1996*	No. 4	Cornell	W 100–46	8–1	Allen Fieldhouse; Lawrence, KS
1/4/1996*	No. 4	East Tennessee State	W 108–73	9–1	Allen Fieldhouse; Lawrence, KS
1/6/1996*	No. 4	SMU	W 83–61	10–1	Allen Fieldhouse; Lawrence, KS
1/8/1996	No. 3	at Oklahoma State	W 76–61	11–1	Gallagher-Iba Arena; Stillwater, OK
1/11/1996*	No. 3	at Florida	W 69–54	12–1	O'Connell Center; Gainesville, FL
1/15/1996*	No. 4	Saint Peter's	W 85–71	13–1	Allen Fieldhouse; Lawrence, KS
1/20/1996	No. 4	Colorado	W 80–78	14–1	Coors Events Center; Boulder, CO
1/22/1996	No. 3	Oklahoma	W 84–66	15–1	Allen Fieldhouse; Lawrence, KS
1/27/1996	No. 3	at Nebraska	W 88–73	16–1	Bob Devaney Sports Center; Lincoln, NE
1/31/1996	No. 3	Oklahoma State	W 84–66	17–1	Allen Fieldhouse; Lawrence, KS
2/4/1996	No. 3	Kansas State; Sunflower Showdown	W 72–62	18–1	Allen Fieldhouse; Lawrence, KS
2/7/1996	No. 3	No. 21 Iowa State	W 89–70	19–1	Allen Fieldhouse; Lawrence, KS
2/10/1996	No. 3	at Missouri; Border War	L 73–77	19–2	Hearnes Center; Columbia, MO
2/14/1996	No. 5	Colorado	W 85–70	20–2	Allen Fieldhouse; Lawrence, KS
2/17/1996	No. 5	at No. 22 Iowa State	W 61–50	21–2	Hilton Coliseum; Ames, IA
2/19/1996	No. 5	Nebraska	W 81–71	22–2	Allen Fieldhouse; Lawrence, KS
2/24/1996	No. 5	at Kansas State; Sunflower Showdown	W 77–66	23–2	Bramlage Coliseum; Manhattan, KS
2/26/1996	No. 3	Missouri; Border War	W 87–65	24–2	Allen Fieldhouse; Lawrence, KS
3/2/1996	No. 3	at Oklahoma	L 79–85	24–3	Lloyd Noble Center; Norman, OK
Big Eight Tournament
3/8/1996	(1) No. 5	vs. (8) Colorado; First round	W 88–55	25–3	Kemper Arena; Kansas City, MO
3/9/1996	(1) No. 5	vs. (4) Kansas State; Semifinals	W 61–55	26–3	Kemper Arena; Kansas City, MO
3/10/1996	(1) No. 5	vs. (2) No. 23 Iowa State; Championship Game	L 55–56	26–4	Kemper Arena; Kansas City, MO
NCAA tournament
3/15/1996*	(2 W) No. 4	vs. (15 W) South Carolina State; First round	W 92–54	27–4	Arizona State University Activity Center; Tempe, AZ
3/17/1996*	(2 W) No. 4	vs. (10 W) Santa Clara; Second Round	W 76–51	28–4	Arizona State University Activity Center; Tempe, AZ
3/22/1996*	(2 W) No. 4	vs. (3 W) No. 11 Arizona; Regional semifinals	W 83–80	29–4	McNichols Sports Arena; Denver, CO
3/24/1996*	(2 W) No. 4	vs. (4 W) No. 15 Syracuse; Regional Finals	L 57–60	29–5	McNichols Sports Arena; Denver, CO
*Non-conference game. ^{#}Rankings from AP Poll, NCAA tournament seeds shown in parentheses. (#) Tournament seedings in parentheses. All times are in Central Standard Time.

== Rankings ==
Poll	Pre	Wk 1	Wk 2	Wk 3	Wk 4	Wk 5	Wk 6	Wk 7	Wk 8	Wk 9	Wk 10	Wk 11	Wk 12	Wk 13	Wk 14	Wk 15	Wk 16	Wk 17
AP	2	2	2	1	1	1	4	4	3	4	3	3	3	5	5	3	5	4
Coaches																		

*There was no coaches poll in week 1.
