= Dave Bliss =

American basketball coach (born 1943)

Biographical details
- Born: September 20, 1943 (age 83); Binghamton, New York, U.S.

Playing career
- 1962–1965: Cornell
- Position: Guard

Coaching career (HC unless noted)
- 1966–1967: Cornell (freshmen)
- 1967–1969: Army (assistant)
- 1969–1971: Cornell (assistant)
- 1971–1975: Indiana (assistant)
- 1975–1980: Oklahoma
- 1980–1988: SMU
- 1988–1999: New Mexico
- 1999–2003: Baylor
- 2005–2006: Dakota Wizards
- 2010–2015: Allen Academy
- 2015–2017: Southwestern Christian
- 2017–2018: Calvary Chapel Christian School

Head coaching record
- Overall: 543–343 (college)
- Tournaments: 8–11 (NCAA Division I); 8–6 (NIT); 6–3 (NCCAA)

Accomplishments and honors

Championships
- Big Eight regular season (1979); Big Eight tournament (1979); SWC regular season (1988); SWC tournament (1988); 2 WAC tournament (1993, 1996); WAC regular season (1994)

Awards
- 2x Big Eight Coach of the Year (1977, 1979); 2× WAC Coach of the Year (1994, 1996)

David Gregory Bliss (born September 20, 1943) is an American basketball coach. He served as the head men's basketball coach at Oklahoma, Southern Methodist, New Mexico, and Baylor of the NCAA Division I, as well as Southwestern Christian of the NAIA.

Bliss resigned from Baylor in 2003 following internal and NCAA investigations into a number of circumstances surrounding the murder of Baylor player Patrick Dennehy by teammate Carlton Dotson. These included the alleged involvement of Bliss in making illicit tuition payments for players Dennehy and Corey Herring, and his attempt to frame Dennehy posthumously as a drug dealer in order to provide cover for himself; in 2005, the NCAA issued Bliss a 10-year "show-cause" notice.

== Education ==
Bliss was born and raised in Binghamton, New York, and graduated from Binghamton Central High School in 1961. He graduated from Cornell University in 1965 where he was elected to the Sphinx Head Society. He then earned an MBA from Cornell in 1967. He was an all-Ivy League guard at Cornell, was captain of the baseball team, and was named to the first team Eastern Intercollegiate Baseball League in 1965. Bliss was inducted to Cornell's athletic Hall of Fame in 1984.

== Coaching background ==
Bliss began his coaching career as an assistant coach at Army under Bob Knight from 1967 to 1969. After serving as an assistant at Cornell from 1969 to 1971, Bliss rejoined Knight at Indiana University from 1971 to 1975, where he met graduate assistant coach Doug Ash.

Bliss got his first head coaching position at the University of Oklahoma, where he coached from 1975 to 1980. Ash joined Bliss at Oklahoma as his top assistant, and remained with Bliss for the rest of his career. It was at Oklahoma where Bliss met his wife, Claudia.

From 1980 to 1988, Bliss was the head coach at Southern Methodist University. He led the Mustangs to three NCAA tournaments, in 1984, 1985 and 1988. His best season was the 1987–88 season, in which the Mustangs won their first outright Southwest Conference regular-season title in 21 years and won the Southwest Conference tournament.

One of Bliss's most successful players while at SMU was Jon Koncak, who was the fifth overall pick in the 1985 NBA draft by the Atlanta Hawks and gold medalist on the 1984 U.S. Olympic basketball team coached by Knight. An NCAA investigation during the mid-'80s reported that Bliss was involved in payments to his players, including Koncak, in violation of NCAA rules. But the NCAA chose not to pursue the investigation any further due to the football program having received the "death penalty". Koncak told the Fort Worth Star-Telegram that he received payments while at SMU, in violation of NCAA rules:

The focus of that story was obviously Dave Bliss, but other people got caught up in it, which is unfortunate," Koncak said. "But, yes, there had been some benefits while I was at SMU, and I did accept some of those benefits. What I did was against the rules.

The NCAA investigation memo from Bliss's time at SMU leaked during 2003, at the peak of the Baylor scandal. The memo reported that Koncak had illegally received the money during his junior and senior years from boosters as well as Bliss.

Bliss left SMU after the 1988 season to take over as head coach at the University of New Mexico, largely due to the violations surrounding the Mustangs football program. He stayed at New Mexico for 11 years and is the school's all-time winningest coach. Under him, the Lobos went to seven NCAA tournaments, and notched four NCAA tournament wins. His best season at the school was 1995–96, when the Lobos finished 28–5 — second best in school history.

Baylor University hired Bliss as head coach for Baylor Bears basketball on March 23, 1999.

In his four seasons at Baylor, Bliss's team only made the post-season once. During his second season (2000–2001), Baylor made the National Invitation Tournament, where they lost in the first round to Bliss's old team, New Mexico. Dennehy was a freshman on that New Mexico team that beat Baylor, and was named to the Mountain West All-Freshman team.

=== The Baylor scandal ===
After a memorial service for Dennehy in San Jose, California, Bliss asked to meet with school investigators. At that meeting, he was told that Dennehy's girlfriend had told them Bliss paid for the sections of Dennehy and Herring's tuition not covered by financial aid. Bliss confessed to making the payments, estimated at $7,000—a major violation of NCAA rules. Two members of Baylor's 2001–02 squad told the Dallas Morning News that Bliss and several members of his staff had been present at a pickup game involving star recruit Harvey Thomas during his official visit to Baylor—another major NCAA rules violation. It also emerged that Bliss and his staff knew about rampant marijuana and alcohol abuse among Baylor players, but did not follow procedures for reporting failed drug tests. Under the circumstances, Bliss was forced to resign on August 8, 2003.

After Bliss resigned, it emerged that he had told players to make up a story about Dennehy being a drug dealer in order to pay for his tuition. The story was intended to serve as a cover-up for Bliss paying Dennehy's tuition. The conversations were tape-recorded by one of Bliss's assistants, Abar Rouse. Bliss had threatened to fire Rouse if he didn't go along with the scheme, leading Rouse to record the conversations. Rouse later sued his attorney for releasing the tapes to investigators. Bliss later called his actions in this phase of the incident "despicable."

Internal and NCAA investigations during 2005 revealed further violations. Besides paying parts of Dennehy and Herring's tuition, Bliss admitted that he'd concealed under-the-table payments to Herring and lied to both the NCAA and Baylor investigators. He also admitted to telling assistant coaches to file false expense reports and lie to Baylor investigators.

In 2005, Bliss was given a 10-year show-cause order for what the NCAA called "despicable behavior", "unethical conduct", and "a blatant and sweeping disregard" of NCAA rules. Had he been hired by an NCAA member school in an athletic capacity before the penalty had expired in 2015, Bliss would have had to agree to abide by any restrictions the NCAA infractions committee imposed on him, and then report back to the NCAA in writing every six months for the duration of the order or until the end of his employment. Bliss's prospective employer would have had to show cause for why Bliss would not have to have restrictions imposed on his duties. The penalty is the most severe punishment the NCAA can hand a coach. Ash was hit with a five-year show-cause order. Another assistant, Rodney Belcher, was hit with a seven-year show-cause order for lying about recruiting violations committed in the course of bringing Dennehy to Baylor.

== Post-Baylor ==
Bliss served for two years as a volunteer assistant coach at a Denver-area high school before being hired as head coach of the Continental Basketball Association's Dakota Wizards. He only lasted one season as coach of the Dakota Wizards before resigning, citing family reasons. In 2008, he returned to Texas for several speaking arrangements, including a Baptist church sermon and the annual convention of the Texas High School Coaches Association.

In May 2010, Bliss became dean of students, athletic director and head men's basketball coach at Allen Academy, a college preparatory school in Bryan, Texas.

Almost immediately Bliss became embroiled in controversy. On November 28, 2010, it was reported by multiple news outlets in Bryan that Bliss received a two-year suspension from coaching basketball and a one-year suspension from school administration at Allen Academy by the Texas Association of Private and Parochial Schools (TAPPS), the largest athletic governing body of private schools in Texas. The suspension came less than a month after the start of his first season as head boys' basketball coach and less than three months after joining the school in an administrative role.

TAPPS Director Edd Burleson declined to comment on the specifics of the ruling from the nine-member board, although Allen Academy Head of School John Rouse, in a letter to parents, said that Bliss had forged Rouse's signature on an approval form for a potential student-athlete. Rouse told the parents that Bliss did not deserve the suspension and announced that the school would withdraw from TAPPS, allowing Bliss to continue to coach. Allen Academy eventually joined the Texas Christian Athletic League (TCAL) and won the boys' basketball state title in Bliss' first season.

In a memorandum, TAPPS cited the Allen Academy administration for a "lack of institutional control". The Baylor Athletic Department was cited for this same offense following the NCAA's 2003 investigation. The SMU Athletic Department received two separate citations for a lack of institutional control during Bliss' tenure as head coach of the Mustangs.

KBTX reported that Bliss had broken TAPPS rules by illegally recruiting potential players from other schools, including two senior transfers from Houston currently on the team. Both players enrolled as boarding students over the summer and were able to play on the varsity team without having to sit out the mandated one-year due to their boarding status. The news outlet also reported that the students received as much as 80% off the school's $10,000 annual tuition.

In 2015, Bliss was hired as the head coach at NAIA-member school Southwestern Christian University. Bliss resigned from Southwestern Christian on April 3, 2017, following the airing of the Showtime documentary Disgraced, which chronicled the cover-up at Baylor.

In 2017, a Las Vegas high school hired him as their head coach. Bliss resigned in 2018, after one season as head coach.

== Head coaching record ==
=== College ===
Record table
Season	Team	Overall	Conference	Standing	Postseason
Oklahoma Sooners (Big Eight Conference) (1975–1980)
1975–76	Oklahoma	9–17	6–8	T–4th	
1976–77	Oklahoma	18–10	9–5	T–3rd	
1977–78	Oklahoma	14–13	7–7	T–4th	
1978–79	Oklahoma	21–10	10–4	1st	NCAA Division I Sweet 16
1979–80	Oklahoma	15–12	6–8	6th	
Oklahoma:		77–62 (.554)	38–32 (.543)		
SMU Mustangs (Southwest Conference) (1980–1988)
1980–81	SMU	7–20	3–13	9th	
1981–82	SMU	6–21	1–15	9th	
1982–83	SMU	19–11	9–7	T–4th	
1983–84	SMU	25–8	12–4	3rd	NCAA Division I Second Round
1984–85	SMU	23–10	10–6	T–2nd	NCAA Division I Second Round
1985–86	SMU	18–11	10–6	4th	NIT First Round
1986–87	SMU	16–13	7–9	T–6th	
1987–88	SMU	28–7	12–4	1st	NCAA Division I Second Round
SMU:		142–101 (.584)	64–64 (.500)		
New Mexico Lobos (Western Athletic Conference) (1988–1999)
1988–89	New Mexico	22–11	11–5	T–2nd	NIT Quarterfinal
1989–90	New Mexico	20–14	9–7	5th	NIT Fourth Place
1990–91	New Mexico	20–10	10–6	3rd	NCAA Division I First Round
1991–92	New Mexico	20–13	11–5	3rd	NIT Quarterfinal
1992–93	New Mexico	24–7	13–5	3rd	NCAA Division I First Round
1993–94	New Mexico	23–8	14–4	1st	NCAA Division I First Round
1994–95	New Mexico	15–15	9–9	T–4th	
1995–96	New Mexico	28–5	14–4	2nd	NCAA Division I Second Round
1996–97	New Mexico	25–8	11–5	3rd (Mountain)	NCAA Division I Second Round
1997–98	New Mexico	24–8	11–3	2nd (Mountain)	NCAA Division I Second Round
1998–99	New Mexico	25–9	9–5	2nd (Pacific)	NCAA Division I Second Round
New Mexico:		246–108 (.695)	122–58 (.678)		
Baylor Bears (Big 12 Conference) (1999–2003)
1999–00	Baylor	14–15	4–12	T–8th	
2000–01	Baylor	19–12	6–10	8th	NIT First Round
2001–02	Baylor	14–16	4–12	T–10th	
2002–03	Baylor	14–14	5–11	T–9th	
Baylor:		61–57 (.517)	19–45 (.297)		
Southwestern Christian Eagles (Sooner Athletic Conference) (2015–2017)
2015–16	Southwestern Christian	19–15	10–8	T–4th	NCCAA Runner-up
2016–17	Southwestern Christian	21–13	11–7	T–3rd	NCCAA Regional Final
Southwestern Christian:		40–28 (.588)	21–15 (.583)		
Total:		566–356 (.614)			
National champion Postseason invitational champion Conference regular season champion Conference regular season and conference tournament champion Division regular season champion Division regular season and conference tournament champion Conference tournament champion
