= 1996 Missouri Valley Conference men's basketball tournament =

- Classification: Division I
- Season: 1995–96
- Teams: 8
- Site: Kiel Center; St. Louis, Missouri
- Champions: Tulsa (4th title)
- Winning coach: Steve Robinson (1st title)
- MVP: Shea Seals (Tulsa)

1995–96 Missouri Valley Conference men's basketball standings
	Conf.				Overall
Team	W		L	PCT	W		L	PCT
Bradley	15	–	3	.833	22	–	8	.733
Illinois State	13	–	5	.722	22	–	12	.647
Tulsa †	12	–	6	.667	22	–	8	.733
Southwest Missouri State	11	–	7	.611	16	–	12	.571
Creighton	9	–	9	.500	14	–	15	.483
Evansville	9	–	9	.500	13	–	14	.481
Northern Iowa	8	–	10	.444	14	–	13	.519
Drake	8	–	10	.444	12	–	15	.444
Indiana State	6	–	12	.333	10	–	16	.385
Wichita State	4	–	14	.222	8	–	21	.276
Southern Illinois	4	–	14	.222	11	–	18	.379
† 1996 MVC tournament winner Rankings from AP Poll

The 1996 Missouri Valley Conference men's basketball tournament was played after the conclusion of the 1995–1996 regular season at the Kiel Center in St. Louis, Missouri.

The Tulsa Golden Hurricane defeated the Bradley Braves in the championship game, 60–46, and as a result won their 4th MVC Tournament title and earned an automatic bid to the 1996 NCAA tournament. Shea Seals of Tulsa was named the tournament MVP.

== Bracket ==
Quarterfinals; March 2, 1996
1	Bradley	64
8	Drake	51
4	Southwest Missouri State	65
5	Creighton	58
2	Illinois State	64
7	Northern Iowa	58
3	Tulsa	65
6	Evansville	55

Semifinals; March 3, 1996
1	Bradley	64
4	Southwest Missouri State	62
2	Illinois State	52
3	Tulsa	69

Final; March 4, 1996
1	Bradley	46
3	Tulsa	60
