= 1995–96 Bradley Braves men's basketball team =

American college basketball season

1995–96 Bradley Braves men's basketball

MVC Regular season champions

NCAA Tournament
- Conference: Missouri Valley Conference
- Record: 22–8 (15–3 MVC)
- Head coach: Jim Molinari (4th season)
- Assistant coaches: Duane Broussard; Pat Donahue; Rob Johnson
- Home arena: Carver Arena

1995–96 Missouri Valley Conference men's basketball standings
	Conf.				Overall
Team	W		L	PCT	W		L	PCT
Bradley	15	–	3	.833	22	–	8	.733
Illinois State	13	–	5	.722	22	–	12	.647
Tulsa †	12	–	6	.667	22	–	8	.733
Southwest Missouri State	11	–	7	.611	16	–	12	.571
Creighton	9	–	9	.500	14	–	15	.483
Evansville	9	–	9	.500	13	–	14	.481
Northern Iowa	8	–	10	.444	14	–	13	.519
Drake	8	–	10	.444	12	–	15	.444
Indiana State	6	–	12	.333	10	–	16	.385
Wichita State	4	–	14	.222	8	–	21	.276
Southern Illinois	4	–	14	.222	11	–	18	.379
† 1996 MVC tournament winner Rankings from AP Poll

The 1995–96 Bradley Braves men's basketball team represented Bradley University as a member of the Missouri Valley Conference during the 1995–96 NCAA Division I men's basketball season. Led by head coach Jim Molinari, the Braves finished the season with a 22–8 record (15–3 MVC). They earned an at-large bid to the NCAA tournament as No. 8 seed in the East Region where they fell to Stanford in the opening round.

== Roster ==
1995–96 Bradley Braves men's basketball team
Players
Coaches

Pos.	#	Name	Height	Weight	Year	Previous school	Hometown
F/C	00	Ben Coupet	6 ft 11 in (2.11 m)	210 lb (95 kg)	Jr	Simeon	Chicago, Illinois
G	5	Aaron Zobrist	6 ft 1 in (1.85 m)	—	Jr	Metamora Township	Metamora, Illinois
G	10	Eric Roberson	6 ft 4 in (1.93 m)	—	Fr	Penn Hills	Pittsburgh, Pennsylvania
G	12	Billy Wright	5 ft 10 in (1.78 m)	175 lb (79 kg)	Sr	Richmond	Richmond, Indiana
G	21	Marcus Samuels	5 ft 11 in (1.8 m)	—	So	Wheeling	Wheeling, Illinois
G/F	24	Anthony Parker	6 ft 6 in (1.98 m)	210 lb (95 kg)	Jr	Central	Naperville, Illinois
G	25	Kerry Burrell	6 ft 3 in (1.91 m)	—	Jr	Simeon	Chicago, Illinois
F/C	30	Chad Kleine	6 ft 8 in (2.03 m)	225 lb (102 kg)	Sr	Mount Vernon	Fortville, Indiana
F	32	Gavin Schairer	6 ft 7 in (2.01 m)	—	Fr	Central	Burlington, Illinois
F	34	Dwayne Funches	6 ft 5 in (1.96 m)	230 lb (104 kg)	Sr	Orr	Chicago, Illinois
F	40	Mbaukwu Nwaogwugwu	6 ft 4 in (1.93 m)	190 lb (86 kg)	Sr	Agricultural Science	Chicago, Illinois
F	42	Deon Jackson	6 ft 6 in (1.98 m)	220 lb (100 kg)	Sr	Patterson	Dayton, Ohio
C	44	James Baptist	7 ft 1 in (2.16 m)	245 lb (111 kg)	Jr	Whitney Young	Chicago, Illinois
F/C	55	Adebayo Akinkunle	6 ft 8 in (2.03 m)	—	So	Morgan Park	Chicago, Illinois

Head coach

- Jim Molinari

Assistant coach(es)

- Duane Broussard
- Pat Donahue
- Rob Judson

Legend

- (C) Team captain
- (S) Suspended
- (I) Ineligible
- (W) Walk-on
- Injured
- Current redshirt

Roster

== Schedule ==
Date time, TV	Rank^{#}	Opponent^{#}	Result	Record	Site (attendance) city, state
Exhibition
Nov 16, 1995*		Republic of Georgia	W 92–42		Carver Arena; Peoria, Illinois
Nov 21, 1995*		AAU Pella Window	W 88–66		Carver Arena; Peoria, Illinois
Regular season
Nov 25, 1995*		at Kansas State	L 72–75 ^{OT}	0–1	Bramlage Coliseum; Manhattan, Kansas
Nov 29, 1995*		at No. 3 Villanova	L 63–70	0–2	The Pavilion; Philadelphia, Pennsylvania
Dec 2, 1995*		New Orleans	W 87–72	1–2	Carver Arena; Peoria, Illinois
Dec 5, 1995*		Saint Louis	W 78–68	2–2	Carver Arena; Peoria, Illinois
Dec 16, 1995*		Western Illinois	W 71–54	3–2	Carver Arena; Peoria, Illinois
Dec 23, 1995*		Chicago State	W 110–80	4–2	Carver Arena; Peoria, Illinois
Dec 29, 1995*		vs. Georgia Tech; Cable Car Classic	W 84–82	5–2	San Jose Arena; San Jose, California
Dec 30, 1995*		vs. Penn State; Cable Car Classic	L 72–75	5–3	San Jose Arena; San Jose, California
Jan 3, 1996		at Creighton	W 75–62	6–3 (1–0)	Omaha Civic Auditorium; Omaha, Nebraska
Jan 6, 1996		at Northern Iowa	W 60–51	7–3 (2–0)	UNI-Dome; Cedar Falls, Iowa
Jan 10, 1996		Creighton	W 68–54	8–3 (3–0)	Carver Arena; Peoria, Illinois
Jan 13, 1996		Southwest Missouri State	L 58–61	8–4 (3–1)	Carver Arena; Peoria, Illinois
Jan 15, 1996		Southern Illinois	W 73–57	9–4 (4–1)	Carver Arena; Peoria, Illinois
Jan 20, 1996; WMBD		at Illinois State	L 72–77	9–5 (4–2)	Redbird Arena (10,310); Normal, Illinois
Jan 23, 1996		at Evansville	W 71–60	10–5 (5–2)	Roberts Municipal Stadium; Evansville, Indiana
Jan 25, 1996		at Indiana State	W 68–58	11–5 (6–2)	Hulman Center; Terre Haute, Indiana
Jan 29, 1996		Wichita State	W 68–49	12–5 (7–2)	Carver Arena; Peoria, Illinois
Jan 31, 1996		Drake	W 77–60	13–5 (8–2)	Carver Arena; Peoria, Illinois
Feb 4, 1996		Tulsa	W 85–72 ^{OT}	14–5 (9–2)	Carver Arena; Peoria, Illinois
Feb 7, 1996		at Southwest Missouri State	W 68–57	15–5 (10–2)	Hammons Student Center; Springfield, Missouri
Feb 10, 1996		Northern Iowa	W 73–71	16–5 (11–2)	Carver Arena; Peoria, Illinois
Feb 15, 1996		at Wichita State	L 60–76	16–6 (11–3)	Levitt Arena; Wichita, Kansas
Feb 17, 1996		at Tulsa	W 74–73	17–6 (12–3)	Tulsa Convention Center; Tulsa, Oklahoma
Feb 21, 1996		Evansville	W 73–58	18–6 (13–3)	Carver Arena; Peoria, Illinois
Feb 24, 1996; ESPN		Illinois State	W 65–64	19–6 (14–3)	Carver Arena (10,926); Peoria, Illinois
Feb 26, 1996		at Southern Illinois	W 79–76	20–6 (15–3)	SIU Arena; Carbondale, Illinois
Missouri Valley Tournament
Mar 2, 1996*	(1)	vs. (8) Drake; Quarterfinals	W 64–51	21–6	Kiel Center; St. Louis, Missouri
Mar 3, 1996*	(1)	vs. (4) Southwest Missouri State; Semifinals	W 64–62	22–6	Kiel Center; St. Louis, Missouri
Mar 4, 1996*	(1)	vs. (3) Tulsa; Championship game	L 46–60	22–7	Kiel Center; St. Louis, Missouri
NCAA Tournament
Mar 14, 1996*; CBS	(8 E)	vs. (9 E) Stanford; First Round	L 58–66	22–8	Providence Civic Center; Providence, Rhode Island
*Non-conference game. ^{#}Rankings from AP Poll. (#) Tournament seedings in parentheses. E=East. All times are in Central Time.

== Awards and honors ==
- Anthony Parker – Missouri Valley Conference Player of the Year
