= 1995–96 Kansas State Wildcats men's basketball team =

American college basketball season

1995–96 Kansas State Wildcats men's basketball

NCAA tournament, First Round
- Conference: Big Eight Conference
- Record: 17–12 (7–7 Big Eight)
- Head coach: Tom Asbury (2nd season)
- Home arena: Bramlage Coliseum

1995–96 Big Eight Conference men's basketball standings
	Conf.				Overall
Team	W		L	PCT	W		L	PCT
No. 4 Kansas	12	–	2	.857	29	–	5	.853
No. 17 Iowa State †	9	–	5	.643	24	–	9	.727
Oklahoma (Note: Adjusted from 17–13 as Purdue forfeited 18 wins)	8	–	6	.571	18	–	12	.600
Kansas State	7	–	7	.500	17	–	12	.586
Oklahoma State	7	–	7	.500	17	–	10	.630
Missouri	6	–	8	.429	18	–	15	.545
Nebraska	4	–	10	.286	21	–	14	.600
Colorado	3	–	11	.214	9	–	18	.333
† 1996 Big Eight tournament winner Rankings from AP Poll

The 1995–96 Kansas State Wildcats men's basketball team represented Kansas State University as a member of the Big 8 Conference during the 1995–96 NCAA Division I men's basketball season. The head coach was Tom Asbury who was in his second season at the helm. The team played its home games at Bramlage Coliseum in Manhattan, Kansas. The Wildcats finished with a record of 17–12 (7–7 Big 8), and received an at-large bid to the NCAA tournament as No. 10 seed in the East region. Kansas State was beaten by No. 7 seed New Mexico in the opening round of the tournament.

== Roster ==
1995–96 Kansas State Wildcats men's basketball team
Players	Coaches
Pos. / # / Name / Height / Weight / Year / Hometown; G / 3 / Elliot Hatcher / 6 ft 0 in (1.83 m) / 175 lb (79 kg) / Sr / Indianapolis, Indiana	Head coach: Tom Asbury (Wyoming); Assistant coach(es) Legend: (C) Team captain; (S) Suspended; (I) Ineligible; (W) Walk-on; Injured; Current redshirt; Roster

== Schedule and results ==
Date time, TV	Rank^{#}	Opponent^{#}	Result	Record	Site city, state
Regular Season
Nov 25, 1995*		Bradley	W 75–72 ^{OT}	1–0	Bramlage Coliseum; Manhattan, Kansas
Feb 4, 1996		at No. 3 Kansas; Sunflower Showdown	L 62–72		Allen Fieldhouse; Lawrence, KS
Feb 24, 1996		No. 5 Kansas; Sunflower Showdown	L 66-77		Bramlage Coliseum; Manhattan, KS
Big 8 Tournament
Mar 8, 1996*		vs. Oklahoma State; Quarterfinals	W 58–55	17–10	Kemper Arena; Kansas City, Missouri
Mar 9, 1996*		vs. No. 5 Kansas; Semifinals	L 55–61	17–11	Kemper Arena; Kansas City, Missouri
NCAA Tournament
Mar 15, 1996*	(10 E)	vs. (7 E) No. 23 New Mexico; First round	L 48–69	17–12	Richmond Coliseum; Richmond, Virginia
*Non-conference game. ^{#}Rankings from AP Poll. (#) Tournament seedings in parentheses. E=East.
