= 1996 Southwest Conference men's basketball tournament =

- Classification: Division I
- Season: 1995–96
- Teams: 8
- Site: Reunion Arena; Dallas, Texas
- Champions: Texas Tech (5th title)
- Winning coach: James Dickey (2nd title)
- MVP: Reggie Freeman (Texas)

1995–96 Southwest Conference men's basketball standings
	Conf.				Overall
Team	W		L	PCT	W		L	PCT
No. 8 Texas Tech †	14	–	0	1.000	30	–	2	.938
Houston	11	–	3	.786	17	–	10	.630
Texas	10	–	4	.714	21	–	10	.677
TCU	6	–	8	.429	15	–	15	.500
Rice	5	–	9	.357	14	–	14	.500
Texas A&M	3	–	11	.214	11	–	16	.407
SMU	3	–	11	.214	8	–	20	.286
Baylor	4	–	10	.286	9	–	18	.333
† 1996 SWC tournament winner Rankings from AP Poll

The 1996 Southwest Conference men's basketball tournament was held in March 7–9, 1996, at Reunion Arena in Dallas, Texas.

Number 1 seed Texas Tech narrowly defeated 3 seed Texas, 75-73, to win their 5th championship and receive the conference's automatic bid to the 1996 NCAA tournament. This was the final season of the Southwest Conference tournament since the SWC would cease operations after the 1995-96 school year.

== Format and seeding ==
The tournament consisted of the top 8 teams playing in a single-elimination tournament.

Place	Seed	Team	Conference			Overall		
Place	Seed	Team	W	L	%	W	L	%
1	1	Texas Tech	14	0	1.000	30	2	.938
2	2	Houston	11	3	.786	17	10	.630
3	3	Texas	10	4	.714	21	10	.677
4	4	TCU	6	8	.429	15	15	.500
5	5	Rice	5	9	.357	14	14	.500
6	6	Baylor	4	10	.286	9	18	.333
7	7	SMU	3	11	.214	8	20	.286
7	8	Texas A&M	3	11	.214	11	16	.407

== Tournament ==
Quarterfinals; Thursday, March 7
1	#7 Texas Tech	85
8	Texas A&M	57
4	TCU	67
5	Rice	78
3	Texas	86
6	Baylor	65
2	Houston	57
7	SMU	62

Semifinals; Friday, March 8
1	#7 Texas Tech	68
5	Rice	53
3	Texas	89
7	SMU	67

Finals; Saturday, March 9
1	#7 Texas Tech	75
3	Texas	73
