= 1995–96 Texas Longhorns men's basketball team =

American college basketball season

1995–96 Texas Longhorns men's basketball

NCAA tournament, second round
- Conference: Southwest Conference
- Record: 21–10 (10–4 SWC)
- Head coach: Tom Penders (8th season)
- Home arena: Frank Erwin Center

1995–96 Southwest Conference men's basketball standings
	Conf.				Overall
Team	W		L	PCT	W		L	PCT
No. 8 Texas Tech †	14	–	0	1.000	30	–	2	.938
Houston	11	–	3	.786	17	–	10	.630
Texas	10	–	4	.714	21	–	10	.677
TCU	6	–	8	.429	15	–	15	.500
Rice	5	–	9	.357	14	–	14	.500
Texas A&M	3	–	11	.214	11	–	16	.407
SMU	3	–	11	.214	8	–	20	.286
Baylor	4	–	10	.286	9	–	18	.333
† 1996 SWC tournament winner Rankings from AP Poll

The 1995–96 Texas Longhorns men's basketball team represented The University of Texas at Austin in intercollegiate basketball competition during the 1995–96 season. The Longhorns were led by eighth-year head coach Tom Penders. The team finished the season with a 21–10 overall record and finished third in Southwest Conference regular season play with a 10–4 conference record. Texas advanced to the NCAA tournament, defeating No. 7 seed Michigan in the opening round before falling to No. 2 seed Wake Forest in the second round.

== Roster ==
1995–96 Texas Longhorns men's basketball team
Players
Coaches

Pos.	#	Name	Height	Weight	Year	Hometown
F	15	Kris Clack	6 ft 5 in (1.96 m)	220 lb (100 kg)	Fr	Austin, Texas
G	32	Reggie Freeman	6 ft 6 in (1.98 m)	215 lb (98 kg)	Jr	The Bronx, New York

Head coach

- Tom Penders (Connecticut)

Assistant coach(es)

Legend

- (C) Team captain
- (S) Suspended
- (I) Ineligible
- (W) Walk-on
- Injured
- Current redshirt

== Schedule and results ==
Date time, TV	Rank^{#}	Opponent^{#}	Result	Record	Site (attendance) city, state
Non-conference regular season
Nov 25, 1995*		North Texas	W 88–67	1–0	Frank Erwin Center; Austin, Texas
Nov 29, 1995*		No. 14 Utah	L 69–70	1–1	Frank Erwin Center; Austin, Texas
Dec 2, 1995*		at DePaul	W 88–84	2–1	Rosemont Horizon; Rosemont, Illinois
Dec 5, 1995*		UTSA	W 110–98	3–1	Frank Erwin Center; Austin, Texas
Dec 9, 1995*		at No. 23 Louisville	L 78–101	3–2	Freedom Hall; Louisville, Kentucky
Dec 16, 1995*		Oregon State	W 83–54	4–2	Frank Erwin Center; Austin, Texas
Dec 21, 1995*		Providence	W 92–83	5–2	Frank Erwin Center; Austin, Texas
Dec 27, 1995*		at Lamar	W 96–82	6–2	Montagne Center; Beaumont, Texas
Dec 30, 1995*		No. 11 North Carolina	W 74–72	7–2	Frank Erwin Center; Austin, Texas
Jan 3, 1996*		at Nebraska	L 69–85	7–3	Bob Devaney Sports Center; Lincoln, Nebraska
SWC Regular season
Jan 6, 1996		Rice	L 69–80	7–4 (0–1)	Frank Erwin Center; Austin, Texas
Jan 13, 1996		TCU	W 103–88	8–4 (1–1)	Frank Erwin Center; Austin, Texas
Jan 16, 1996		at Texas A&M	W 86–70	9–4 (2–1)	G. Rollie White Coliseum; College Station, Texas
Jan 20, 1996		SMU	W 81–63	10–4 (3–1)	Frank Erwin Center; Austin, Texas
Jan 24, 1996		Baylor	W 90–81	11–4 (4–1)	Frank Erwin Center; Austin, Texas
Jan 28, 1996		at No. 22 Texas Tech	L 78–79	11–5 (4–2)	Lubbock Municipal Coliseum; Lubbock, Texas
Feb 3, 1996		Houston	W 80–63	12–6 (5–2)	Frank Erwin Center; Austin, Texas
Feb 7, 1996		at Rice	W 79–64	13–6 (6–2)	Rice Gymnasium; Houston, Texas
Feb 11, 1996		at TCU	W 102–81	14–6 (7–2)	Daniel-Meyer Coliseum; Fort Worth, Texas
Feb 14, 1996		Texas A&M	W 69–50	15–6 (8–2)	Frank Erwin Center; Austin, Texas
Feb 17, 1996		at SMU	W 101–66	16–6 (9–2)	Moody Coliseum; Dallas, Texas
Feb 20, 1996		at Baylor	W 80–72	17–6 (10–2)	Ferrell Center; Waco, Texas
Feb 24, 1996		No. 9 Texas Tech	L 58–75	17–7 (10–3)	Frank Erwin Center; Austin, Texas
Feb 26, 1996*		at Rhode Island	W 81–77	18–7	Keaney Gymnasium; Kingston, Rhode Island
Mar 2, 1996		at Houston	L 76–86	18–8 (10–4)	Hofheinz Pavilion; Houston, Texas
Southwest Conference tournament
Mar 7, 1996*		vs. Baylor; Quarterfinals	W 86–65	19–8	Reunion Arena; Dallas, Texas
Mar 8, 1996*		vs. SMU; Semifinals	W 89–67	20–8	Reunion Arena; Dallas, Texas
Mar 9, 1996*		vs. No. 7 Texas Tech; Championship game	L 73–75	20–9	Reunion Arena; Dallas, Texas
1996 NCAA Tournament – Midwest No. 10 seed
Mar 15, 1996*	(10 MW)	vs. (7 MW) Michigan; Second Round	W 80–76	21–9	Bradley Center; Milwaukee, Wisconsin
Mar 17, 1996*	(10 MW)	vs. (2 MW) No. 9 Wake Forest; Second Round	L 62–65	21–10	Bradley Center; Milwaukee, Wisconsin
*Non-conference game. ^{#}Rankings from AP poll. (#) Tournament seedings in parentheses. MW=Midwest. All times are in Central Standard Time.
