= Dedric Willoughby =

American basketball player (1974–2023)

Personal information
- Born: May 27, 1974 New Orleans, Louisiana, U.S.
- Died: July 19, 2023 (aged 49) Atlanta, Georgia, U.S.
- Listed height: 6 ft 3 in (1.91 m)
- Listed weight: 180 lb (82 kg)

Career information
- High school: Archbishop Shaw (Marrero, Louisiana)
- College: New Orleans (1992–1994); Iowa State (1995–1997)
- NBA draft: 1997: undrafted
- Playing career: 1997–2001
- Position: Point guard
- Number: 9

Career history
- 1997–1998: Viola Reggio Calabria
- 1998–1999: Scaligera Basket Verona
- 1999–2000: Chicago Bulls
- 2000: Basket Livorno
- 2001: Sydney Kings

Career highlights
- First-team All-Big 12 (1997)
- Stats at NBA.com
- Stats at Basketball Reference

Dedric Demond Willoughby (May 27, 1974 – July 19, 2023) was an American professional basketball player. He played for the Chicago Bulls of the National Basketball Association (NBA).

== Playing career ==
Willoughby attended Archbishop Shaw High School in Marrero, Louisiana. He enrolled at the University of New Orleans and played college basketball for the New Orleans Privateers for two years. He transferred to Iowa State University to play for the Iowa State Cyclones for two years. His coach at both schools was Tim Floyd. During each of his two seasons at Iowa State, Willoughby was the runner-up for the Big 12 Conference Player of the Year Award. As a senior, he averaged 18.9 points per game and made 45% of his three-point field goal attempts.

After playing professionally in Italy, Willoughby made the roster of the Chicago Bulls for the 1999–2000 NBA season, and was reunited once again with coach Tim Floyd. He appeared in 25 games that season, registering one start, and averaged 7.6 points.

During the next season, Willoughby signed with the Sydney Kings of the Australian National Basketball League. However, he injured his knee in a practice, and was released shortly afterward, only having played in one game with the team.

== Later life ==
Willoughby later became a coach with the All-Iowa Attack youth basketball program in Ames, Iowa.

== Death ==
Willoughby died on July 19, 2023, at the age of 49. He suffered a heart attack during a pick-up game of basketball in Atlanta.

== Career statistics ==
Legend
GP	Games played	GS	Games started	MPG	Minutes per game
FG%	Field goal percentage	3P%	3-point field goal percentage	FT%	Free throw percentage
RPG	Rebounds per game	APG	Assists per game	SPG	Steals per game
BPG	Blocks per game	PPG	Points per game	**Bold**	Career high

=== NBA ===
==== Regular season ====
Year	Team	GP	GS	MPG	FG%	3P%	FT%	RPG	APG	SPG	BPG	PPG
1999–00	Chicago	25	1	20.3	.341	.296	.765	2.0	2.6	.9	.1	7.6
