= 1993–94 Duke Blue Devils men's basketball team =

American college basketball season

1993–94 Duke Blue Devils men's basketball

NCAA tournament, Runner-up ACC regular season champions

National Championship Game, L 72–76 vs. Arkansas
- Conference: Atlantic Coast Conference

Ranking
- Coaches: No. 2
- AP: No. 6
- Record: 28–6 (12–4 ACC)
- Head coach: Mike Krzyzewski (14th season)
- Assistant coaches: Mike Brey; Tommy Amaker; Pete Gaudet
- Home arena: Cameron Indoor Stadium

1993–94 ACC men's basketball standings
	Conf.				Overall
Team	W		L	PCT	W		L	PCT
No. 6 Duke	12	–	4	.750	28	–	6	.824
No. 1 North Carolina †	11	–	5	.688	28	–	7	.800
Wake Forest	9	–	7	.563	21	–	12	.636
Virginia	8	–	8	.500	18	–	13	.581
Maryland	8	–	8	.500	18	–	12	.600
Georgia Tech	7	–	9	.438	16	–	13	.552
Florida State	6	–	10	.375	13	–	14	.481
Clemson	6	–	10	.375	18	–	16	.529
NC State	5	–	11	.313	11	–	19	.367
† 1994 ACC tournament winner Rankings from AP poll

The 1993–94 Duke Blue Devils men's basketball team represented Duke University during the 1993–94 NCAA Division I men's basketball season. The head coach was Mike Krzyzewski. The team played its home games in the Cameron Indoor Stadium in Durham, North Carolina, and was a member of the Atlantic Coast Conference.

Having failed to win a third consecutive national championship the season before, the Blue Devils looked to improve on that. Duke finished the regular season #6 in the AP Poll and earned the #2 seed in the Southeast Region, which they won by defeating top-seeded Purdue to advance to the Final Four for the fifth time in six years. The Blue Devils returned to the National Championship Game for the fourth time in five years, but lost to Arkansas 76–72.

== Roster ==
1993–94 Duke Blue Devils men's basketball team
Players
Coaches

Pos.	#	Name	Height	Weight	Year	Previous school	Hometown
SG	3	Marty Clark	6 ft 6 in (1.98 m)	200 lb (91 kg)	Sr	St. Joseph	Westchester, Illinois
SG	4	Kenny Blakeney	6 ft 4 in (1.93 m)	190 lb (86 kg)	Sr	DeMatha	Washington, D.C.
G	5	Jeff Capel	6 ft 5 in (1.96 m)	195 lb (88 kg)	Fr	South View	Fayetteville, NC
G	20	Chris Collins	6 ft 3 in (1.91 m)	175 lb (79 kg)	So	Glenbrook North	Northbrook, IL
SF	21	Antonio Lang	6 ft 8 in (2.03 m)	215 lb (98 kg)	Sr	LeFlore	Mobile, AL
SF	33	Grant Hill (C)	6 ft 8 in (2.03 m)	225 lb (102 kg)	Sr	South Lakes	Reston, Virginia
PF	44	Cherokee Parks	6 ft 11 in (2.11 m)	235 lb (107 kg)	Jr	Marina	Huntington Beach, California
C	52	Erik Meek	6 ft 10 in (2.08 m)	240 lb (109 kg)	Jr	San Pasqual	Escondido, California
C	55	Greg Newton	6 ft 10 in (2.08 m)	245 lb (111 kg)	Fr	A. N. Myer Secondary School	Niagara Falls, Ontario

Head coach

- Mike Krzyzewski

Assistant coach(es)

- Pete Gaudet
- Mike Brey
- Tommy Amaker

Legend

- (C) Team captain
- (S) Suspended
- (I) Ineligible
- (W) Walk-on
- Injured
- Current redshirt

Roster
Last update: March 21, 2020

=== Depth chart ===
Pos.	Starting 5	Bench 1	Bench 2
C	Erik Meek	Greg Newton	Joey Beard
PF	Cherokee Parks	Christian Ast
SF	Grant Hill	Antonio Lang	Stan Brunson
SG	Kenny Blakeney	Marty Clark	Tony Moore
PG	Jeff Capel	Chris Collins

== Schedule ==
Date time, TV	Rank^{#}	Opponent^{#}	Result	Record	Site city, state
Regular season
November 27, 1993*	No. 4	Northeastern	W 86–72	1–0	Cameron Indoor Stadium; Durham, N.C.
December 1, 1993*	No. 6	The Citadel	W 78–63	2–0	Cameron Indoor Stadium; Durham, N.C.
December 4, 1993*	No. 6	Xavier	W 82–60	3–0	Cameron Indoor Stadium; Durham, N.C.
December 6, 1993*	No. 4	South Carolina State	W 97–61	4–0	Cameron Indoor Stadium; Durham, N.C.
December 11, 1993*	No. 4	at No. 3 Michigan	W 73–63	5–0	Crisler Arena; Ann Arbor, MI
December 22, 1993*	No. 3	at Iowa	W 79–76	6–0	Carver–Hawkeye Arena; Iowa City, IA
December 30, 1993*	No. 3	Western Carolina	W 87–67	7–0	Cameron Indoor Stadium; Durham, N.C.
January 5, 1994	No. 3	at Clemson	W 71–65	8–0	Littlejohn Coliseum; Clemson, SC
January 8, 1994	No. 3	No. 12 Georgia Tech	W 88–71	9–0	Cameron Indoor Stadium; Durham, N.C.
January 10, 1994*	No. 2	Brown	W 89–71	10–0	Cameron Indoor Stadium; Durham, N.C.
January 13, 1994	No. 2	Wake Forest	L 68–69	10–1	Cameron Indoor Stadium; Durham, N.C.
January 15, 1994	No. 2	at Virginia	W 66–58	11–1	University Hall; Charlottesville, VA
January 20, 1994	No. 5	at NC State	W 92–65	12–1	Reynolds Coliseum; Raleigh, NC
January 22, 1994	No. 5	Florida State	W 106–79	13–1	Cameron Indoor Stadium; Durham, N.C.
January 26, 1994*	No. 2	Notre Dame	W 74–72	14–1	Cameron Indoor Stadium; Durham, N.C.
January 29, 1994	No. 2	No. 18 Maryland; Rivalry	W 75–62	15–1	Cameron Indoor Stadium; Durham, N.C.
February 3, 1994	No. 1	at No. 2 North Carolina; Rivalry	L 78–89	15–2	Dean Smith Center; Chapel Hill, NC
February 5, 1994	No. 1	Clemson	W 78–74	16–2	Cameron Indoor Stadium; Durham, N.C.
February 8, 1994	No. 2	at Georgia Tech	W 66–63	17–2	Alexander Memorial Coliseum; Atlanta, GA
February 13, 1994	No. 2	at Wake Forest	L 69–78	17–3	LJVM Coliseum; Winston-Salem, NC
February 16, 1994	No. 6	Virginia	W 84–54	18–3	Cameron Indoor Stadium; Durham, N.C.
February 20, 1994	No. 6	NC State	W 85–58	19–3	Cameron Indoor Stadium; Durham, N.C.
February 23, 1994	No. 2	at Florida State	W 84–72	20–3	Donald L. Tucker Civic Center; Tallahassee, FL
February 27, 1994*	No. 2	No. 8 Temple	W 59–47	21–3	Cameron Indoor Stadium; Durham, N.C.
March 2, 1994	No. 2	at Maryland; Rivalry	W 73–69	22–3	Cole Fieldhouse; College Park, MD
March 5, 1994	No. 2	No. 5 North Carolina; Rivalry	L 77–87	22–4	Cameron Indoor Stadium; Durham, N.C.
ACC tournament
March 11, 1994	(1) No. 5	vs. (8) Clemson; Quarterfinals	W 77–64	23–4	Charlotte Coliseum; Charlotte, N.C.
March 12, 1994	(1) No. 5	vs. (4) Virginia; Semifinals	L 61–66	23–5	Charlotte Coliseum; Charlotte, N.C.
NCAA tournament
March 18, 1994*	(2 SE) No. 6	vs. (15 SE) Texas Southern; First Round	W 82–70	24–5	Thunderdome; St. Petersburg, Fla.
March 20, 1994*	(2 SE) No. 6	vs. (7 SE) Michigan State; Second Round	W 85–74	25–5	Thunderdome; St. Petersburg, Fla.
March 24, 1994*	(2 SE) No. 6	vs. (6 SE) No. 21 Marquette; Sweet Sixteen	W 59–49	26–5	Thompson-Boling Arena; Knoxville, Tenn.
March 26, 1994*	(2 SE) No. 6	vs. (1 SE) No. 3 Purdue; Elite Eight	W 69–60	27–5	Thompson-Boling Arena; Knoxville, Tenn.
April 2, 1994*; CBS	(2 SE) No. 6	vs. (3 E) No. 14 Florida; Final Four	W 70–65	28–5	Charlotte Coliseum; Charlotte, N.C.
April 4, 1994*; CBS	(2 SE) No. 6	vs. (1 MW) No. 2 Arkansas; National Championship	L 72–76	28–6	Charlotte Coliseum; Charlotte, N.C.
*Non-conference game. ^{#}Rankings from AP Poll. (#) Tournament seedings in parentheses. SE=Southeast region. Source: Duke media guide

== Awards and honors ==
- Grant Hill, ACC Player of the Year

== Team players drafted into the NBA ==
Round	Pick	Player	NBA club
1	3	Grant Hill	Detroit Pistons
2	29	Antonio Lang	Phoenix Suns
