= Liberty Flames basketball statistical leaders =

The Liberty Flames basketball statistical leaders are individual statistical leaders of the Liberty Flames basketball program, which represents Liberty University in men's basketball as a member of the NCAA Division I Conference USA. Leaders are listed in various categories, including points, three-pointers, rebounds, assists, steals, and blocks. Within those areas, the lists identify single-game, single-season, and career leaders.

Liberty, originally known as Lynchburg Baptist College, began competing in intercollegiate basketball in 1972 as a member of the National Christian College Athletic Association (NCCAA). In 1975, the same year in which the school changed its name to Liberty Baptist College, it joined the National Association of Intercollegiate Athletics (NAIA). LBC joined the NCAA in 1980 as a Division II member while retaining its NAIA membership; it dropped its NAIA membership in 1983 and adopted its current name in 1985. Liberty moved to Division I in the 1988–89 season. This history is significant because the official recording of statistics began at different times in different organizations, as well as different NCAA divisions. The NAIA record books do not indicate when the organization began officially recording statistics on a national basis, but its current records (as of 2020–21) for single-game and single-season assists were both set in 1972–73, and the career record for blocks dates to 1975. The NCAA has recorded scoring statistics throughout the "modern era" of basketball, which it defines as starting with the 1937–38 season, the first after the center jump after each made field goal was abolished. Individual rebounding was first recorded in 1950–51, as were individual assists. While rebounding has been recorded in every subsequent season, the NCAA stopped recording individual assists after the 1951–52 season. Assists were not reinstated as an official statistic in Division I until the 1983–84 season. Three-pointers were first officially recorded in all divisions in 1986–87, the first season in which the three-pointer was mandatory in NCAA men's play at a standardized distance from the basket. Blocks and steals were first recorded in D-I in 1988–89, during Liberty's first season at that level. That season was also the first in which assists were recorded in Division II; blocks and steals were not recorded at that level until 1992–93.

Liberty's record books include players in all named statistics, regardless of whether they were officially recorded by any of the governing bodies in which the school was a member.

Leaders are current as of the end of the 2022–23 season.

== Scoring ==
Career
Rank	Player	Points	Seasons
1	Darius McGhee	2,685	2018–19 2019–20 2020–21 2021–22 2022–23
2	Karl Hess	2,373	1976–77 1977–78 1978–79 1979–80
3	Larry Blair	2,211	2003–04 2004–05 2005–06 2006–07
4	Bailey Alston	2,115	1987–88 1988–89 1989–90
5	Mark Chafin	1,951	1974–75 1975–76 1976–77 1977–78
6	Steve Isaacs	1,777	1979–80 1980–81 1981–82 1982–83
7	Anthony Smith	1,754	2005–06 2006–07 2007–08 2008–09
8	Peter Aluma	1,715	1993–94 1994–95 1995–96 1996–97
9	Ed Vickers	1,658	1977–78 1978–79 1979–80
10	Willard DeShazor	1,545	1973–74 1974–75 1975–76 1976–77

Season
Rank	Player	Points	Season
1	Karl Hess	972	1979–80
2	Darius McGhee	821	2022–23
3	Darius McGhee	812	2021–22
4	Karl Hess	757	1978–79
5	Bailey Alston	756	1987–88
6	Bailey Alston	714	1989–90
7	Ed Vickers	708	1979–80

Single game
Rank	Player	Points	Season	Opponent
1	Darius McGhee	48	2021–22	Florida Gulf Coast
2	Darius McGhee	47	2021–22	Kennesaw State
3	Bailey Alston	46	1987–88	Ferrum
4	Ed Vickers	45	1978–79	St. Paul's
5	Karl Hess	43	1978–79	Valley Forge
	Darius McGhee	43	2022–23	Kennesaw State
7	Bailey Alston	42	1987–88	Mt. St. Mary's
	Bailey Alston	42	1987–88	Indiana- Southeast
9	Matt Hildebrand	41	1993–94	Charleston Southern
	Darius McGhee	41	2021–22	Stanford

== Three-pointers ==
Career
Rank	Player	3FG	Seasons
1	Darius McGhee	528	2018–19 2019–20 2020–21 2021–22 2022–23
2	Kaden Metheny	288	2023–24 2024–25 2025–26
3	Kyle Rode	269	2019–20 2020–21 2021–22 2022–23 2023–24
4	Ryan Kemrite	258	2010–11 2011–12 2012–13 2013–14
5	Larry Blair	227	2003–04 2004–05 2005–06 2006–07
6	Larry Jackson	224	1995–96 1996–97 1996–97 1997–98
7	Anthony Smith	220	2005–06 2006–07 2007–08 2008–09

Season
Rank	Player	3FG	Season
1	Darius McGhee	162	2022–23
2	Darius McGhee	142	2021–22
3	Brett Decker Jr.	114	2025–26
4	Davon Marshall	107	2012–13
5	Seth Curry	102	2008–09
	Kaden Metheny	102	2024–25
7	Kyle Ohman	100	2008–09
	Kyle Rode	100	2023–24

Single game
Rank	Player	3FGM	3FGA	Season	Opponent
1	Darius McGhee	9	13	2022–23	Grambling
2	Darius McGhee	9	14	2022–23	Bellarmine
3	Brett Decker Jr.	8	10	2025–26	Kennesaw Christian
4	Darius McGhee	8	11	2020–21	Bellarmine
5	Brett Decker Jr.	8	13	2025–26	Louisiana Tech
6	Darius McGhee	8	14	2021–22	Florida Gulf Coast
	Darius McGhee	8	14	2022–23	Kennesaw State
8	Darius McGhee	8	15	2022–23	Bellarmine
	Larry Jackson	8	??	1996–97	Cal Poly

== Rebounds ==
Career
Rank	Player	Rebounds	Seasons
1	Steve Isaacs	1,130	1979–80 1980–81 1981–82 1982–83
2	Ed Vickers	1,012	1977–78 1978–79 1979–80
3	George Sweet	1,006	1972–73 1973–74 1974–75 1975–76
4	Scottie James	891	2017–18 2018–19 2019–20
5	Willard DeShazor	870	1973–74 1974–75 1975–76 1976–77

Season
Rank	Player	Rebounds	Season
1	Ed Vickers	416	1979–80
2	Ed Vickers	401	1978–79
3	Steve Isaacs	360	1979–80
4	John Brown	344	2010–11
5	Scottie James	330	2017–18
	Cliff Webber	330	1984–85

Single game
Rank	Player	Rebounds	Season	Opponent
1	Ed Vickers	23	1978–79	Presbyterian
	Ed Vickers	23	1978–79	Bowie State
	Willard DeShazor	23	1973–74	Shenandoah
4	Willard DeShazor	22	1973–74	Eastern Mennonite
5	Eric Cunningham	20	1987–88	Mt. St. Mary's
	Steve Isaacs	20	1981–82	Bluefield State

== Assists ==
Career
Rank	Player	Assists	Seasons
1	Jesse Sanders	727	2008–09 2009–10 2010–11 2011–12
2	Karl Hess	648	1976–77 1977–78 1978–79 1979–80
3	Matt Hildebrand	583	1990–91 1991–92 1992–93 1993–94
4	Zach Cleveland	569	2022–23 2023–24 2024–25 2025–26
5	Kenny Gunn	535	1981–82 1982–83 1983–84 1984–85
6	Colin Porter	520	2022–23 2023–24 2024–25 2025–26
7	Ed Gomes	476	1973–74 1974–75 1975–76

Season
Rank	Player	Assists	Season
1	Ed Gomes	256	1975–76
2	Jesse Sanders	255	2011–12
3	Zach Cleveland	225	2025–26
4	TeeJay Bannister	224	2007–08
5	Karl Hess	214	1978–79
6	Karl Hess	213	1979–80

Single game
Rank	Player	Assists	Season	Opponent
1	Kenny Gunn	20	1983–84	Roberts Wesleyan
2	Ed Gomes	19	1975–76	Grace
3	Jesse Sanders	16	2011–12	Montreat
	Jim Pearce	16	1987–88	Assumption
5	TeeJay Bannister	15	2007–08	Coastal Carolina
	Matt Hildebrand	15	1992–93	Winthrop

== Steals ==
Career
Rank	Player	Steals	Seasons
1	Ed Gomes	300	1973–74 1974–75 1975–76
2	Kenny Gunn	269	1981–82 1982–83 1983–84 1984–85
3	Mark Chafin	225	1974–75 1975–76 1976–77 1977–78
4	Chris Caldwell	224	1998–99 1999–00 2000–01 2001–02
5	Larry Blair	221	2003–04 2004–05 2005–06 2006–07

Season
Rank	Player	Steals	Season
1	Ed Gomes	137	1975–76
2	Mike Goad	113	1974–75
3	Carl Williams	107	1999–00
	Ed Vickers	107	1979–80
5	Kenny Gunn	101	1982–83

Single game
Rank	Player	Steals	Season	Opponent
1	Mike Goad	12	1973–74	Baptist Bible
2	Mike Goad	10	1973–74	Shenandoah
3	Kenny Gunn	8	1982–83	Campbell
	Mickey Baker	8	1980–81	New England
	Ed Vickers	8	1979–80	Clearwater Chr.

== Blocks ==
Career
Rank	Player	Blocks	Seasons
1	Peter Aluma	366	1993–94 1994–95 1995–96 1996–97
2	Zach Cleveland	127	2022–23 2023–24 2024–25 2025–26
3	Antwan Burrus	124	2009–10 2010–11 2011–12 2013–14
4	Julius Nwosu	112	1990–91 1991–92 1992–93
5	Willard Deshazor	107	1973–74 1974–75 1975–76 1976–77
6	Andrew Smith	102	2011–12 2012–13 2013–14 2014–15

Season
Rank	Player	Blocks	Season
1	Peter Aluma	113	1995–96
2	Peter Aluma	97	1996–97
	Peter Aluma	97	1994–95
4	Peter Aluma	59	1993–94
5	Julius Nwosu	52	1990–91

Single game
Rank	Player	Blocks	Season	Opponent
1	Peter Aluma	8	1995–96	Hampton
	Peter Aluma	8	1995–96	Howard
	Mark Thomas	8	1977–78	Ohio Northern
4	Peter Aluma	7	1996–97	Winthrop
	Peter Aluma	7	1995–96	Radford
	Peter Aluma	7	1994–95	UT-Chattanooga
