= 1993–94 Wake Forest Demon Deacons men's basketball team =

American college basketball season

1993–94 Wake Forest Demon Deacons men's basketball

NCAA tournament, Second round
- Conference: Atlantic Coast Conference
- Record: 21–12 (9–7 ACC)
- Head coach: Dave Odom (5th season)
- Assistant coaches: Ricky Stokes; Jerry Wainwright
- Captain: Randolph Childress
- Home arena: LJVM Coliseum

1993–94 ACC men's basketball standings
	Conf.				Overall
Team	W		L	PCT	W		L	PCT
No. 6 Duke	12	–	4	.750	28	–	6	.824
No. 1 North Carolina †	11	–	5	.688	28	–	7	.800
Wake Forest	9	–	7	.563	21	–	12	.636
Virginia	8	–	8	.500	18	–	13	.581
Maryland	8	–	8	.500	18	–	12	.600
Georgia Tech	7	–	9	.438	16	–	13	.552
Florida State	6	–	10	.375	13	–	14	.481
Clemson	6	–	10	.375	18	–	16	.529
NC State	5	–	11	.313	11	–	19	.367
† 1994 ACC tournament winner Rankings from AP poll

The 1993–94 Wake Forest Demon Deacons men's basketball team represented Wake Forest University as members of the Atlantic Coast Conference during the 1993–94 men's college basketball season. The team was led by 5th year head coach Dave Odom, and played their home games at LJVM Coliseum.

Wake Forest completed the ACC regular season with a third place finish at 9–7. They defeated Georgia Tech in the quarterfinals of the ACC tournament, before losing to North Carolina in the semifinal round. For the second straight season, the Demon Deacons received an at-large bid to the NCAA tournament as No. 5 seed in the Southeast region. The team beat the College of Charleston in the opening round before losing to No. 4 seed Kansas in the round of 32 to finish with a 21–12 overall record.

Head coach Dave Odom was named ACC Coach of the Year for the second time.

== Previous season ==
The Demon Deacons finished tied for third in the ACC regular season with an 10–6 conference record. They lost to Virginia in the quarterfinal round of the ACC tournament, but received an at-large bid to the NCAA tournament as No. 5 seed in the Southeast region. Making their third consecutive appearance in the NCAA tournament, Wake Forest beat Chattanooga and Iowa to advance to the Sweet Sixteen for the first time since 1984. The Demon Deacons were eliminated by No. 1 seed Kentucky in the regional semifinals round to finish with a 21–9 record (10–6 ACC).

Junior Rodney Rogers was ACC Player of the Year, a consensus second-team All-American, and was selected by the Denver Nuggets with the 9th overall pick in the 1993 NBA draft.

== Roster ==
1993–94 Wake Forest Demon Deacons men's basketball team
Players
Coaches

Pos.	#	Name	Height	Weight	Year	Previous school	Hometown
G	3	Barry Canty	6 ft 5 in (1.96 m)	170 lb (77 kg)	So	Independence	Charlotte, NC
G	5	Stacey Castle	6 ft 1 in (1.85 m)	170 lb (77 kg)	So	Oak Hill Academy (VA)	Far Rockaway, NY
G	10	Rusty LaRue	6 ft 2 in (1.88 m)	185 lb (84 kg)	So	Northwest Guilford	Oak Ridge, NC
G	13	Charlie Harrison	6 ft 1 in (1.85 m)	165 lb (75 kg)	Sr	Archbishop Carroll	Washington, DC
G	20	Marc Scott	6 ft 2 in (1.88 m)	185 lb (84 kg)	Fr	—	Chapel Hill, NC
F/C	21	Tim Duncan	6 ft 11 in (2.11 m)	240 lb (109 kg)	Fr	St. Dunstan's Episcopal	Saint Croix, U.S. Virgin Islands
G	22	Randolph Childress (C)	6 ft 2 in (1.88 m)	175 lb (79 kg)	Jr	Flint Hill School	Clinton, MD
G	25	Marc Blucas	6 ft 3 in (1.91 m)	—	Sr	Girard	Girard, PA
G	31	Matt Simpson	6 ft 3 in (1.91 m)	205 lb (93 kg)	Fr	Franklin Road Academy	Nashville, TN
F	34	Travis Banks	6 ft 6 in (1.98 m)	215 lb (98 kg)	Jr	Clinton HS	Clinton, NC
F	40	Trelonnie Owens	6 ft 8 in (2.03 m)	245 lb (111 kg)	Sr	Bladenboro	Bladenboro, NC
F	42	Bobby Fitzgibbons	6 ft 8 in (2.03 m)	205 lb (93 kg)	So	Nichols	Buffalo, NY
F	44	Ricky Peral	6 ft 10 in (2.08 m)	230 lb (104 kg)	Fr	—	Valladolid, Spain
C	51	Stan King	7 ft 0 in (2.13 m)	252 lb (114 kg)	Sr	August Martin	Jamaica, NY
C	—	Marc Schoone	7 ft 0 in (2.13 m)	235 lb (107 kg)	Fr	—	Amsterdam, The Netherlands

Head coach

- Dave Odom

Assistant coach(es)

- Ricky Stokes

Legend

- (C) Team captain
- (S) Suspended
- (I) Ineligible
- (W) Walk-on
- Injured
- Current redshirt

Roster
Last update: March 24, 2020

== Schedule and results ==
Date time, TV	Rank^{#}	Opponent^{#}	Result	Record	Site city, state
Regular Season
Nov 25, 1993*		at Alaska Anchorage; Great Alaska Shootout	L 68–70	0–1	Sullivan Arena; Anchorage, Alaska
Nov 26, 1993*		vs. Hawaii; Great Alaska Shootout	W 78–49	1–1	Sullivan Arena; Anchorage, Alaska
Nov 27, 1993*		vs. Green Bay; Great Alaska Shootout	W 61–58 ^{OT}	2–1	Sullivan Arena; Anchorage, Alaska
Dec 1, 1993*		Winthrop	W 75–59	3–1	LJVM Coliseum; Winston-Salem, North Carolina
Dec 4, 1993*		Richmond	W 71–65	4–1	LJVM Memorial Coliseum; Winston-Salem, North Carolina
Dec 6, 1993*		Davidson	W 77–68	5–1	LJVM Coliseum; Winston-Salem, North Carolina
Dec 8, 1993*		at No. 23 Vanderbilt	L 83–91 ^{2OT}	5–2	Memorial Gymnasium; Nashville, Tennessee
Dec 19, 1993*		Appalachian State	W 83–78	6–2	LJVM Coliseum; Winston-Salem, North Carolina
Dec 22, 1993*		Marshall	W 82–60	7–2	LJVM Coliseum; Winston-Salem, North Carolina
Dec 30, 1993*		California	L 72–73	7–3	LJVM Coliseum; Winston-Salem, North Carolina
Jan 3, 1994*		Canisius	W 75–51	8–3	LJVM Coliseum; Winston-Salem, North Carolina
Jan 5, 1994*		VMI	W 72–44	9–3	LJVM Coliseum; Winston-Salem, North Carolina
Jan 8, 1994*		at Florida State	W 90–66	10–3 (1–0)	Donald L. Tucker Center; Tallahassee, Florida
Jan 13, 1994*		at No. 2 Duke	W 69–68	11–3 (2–0)	Cameron Indoor Stadium; Durham, North Carolina
Jan 15, 1994*		Maryland	L 58–61	11–4 (2–1)	LJVM Coliseum; Winston-Salem, North Carolina
Jan 19, 1994*		No. 17 Georgia Tech	W 67–63	12–4 (3–1)	LJVM Coliseum; Winston-Salem, North Carolina
Jan 22, 1994*		at Clemson	L 68–75	12–5 (3–2)	Littlejohn Coliseum; Clemson, South Carolina
Jan 26, 1994		Virginia	L 59–61	12–6 (3–3)	LJVM Coliseum; Winston-Salem, North Carolina
Jan 30, 1994		at No. 4 North Carolina; Rivalry	L 61–85	12–7 (3–4)	Dean Smith Center; Chapel Hill, North Carolina
Feb 2, 1994*		NC State	W 72–60	13–7 (4–4)	LJVM Coliseum; Winston-Salem, North Carolina
Feb 5, 1994*		vs. Rhode Island	W 72–59	14–7	
Feb 10, 1994		Florida State	W 77–69	15–7 (5–4)	LJVM Coliseum; Winston-Salem, North Carolina
Feb 13, 1994		No. 2 Duke	W 78–69	16–7 (6–4)	LJVM Coliseum; Winston-Salem, North Carolina
Feb 16, 1994		at Maryland	L 58–81	16–8 (6–5)	Cole Fieldhouse; College Park, Maryland
Feb 19, 1994		at No. 25 Georgia Tech	L 69–71	16–9 (6–6)	Alexander Memorial Coliseum; Atlanta, Georgia
Feb 22, 1994		Clemson	W 80–69	17–9 (7–6)	LJVM Coliseum; Winston-Salem, North Carolina
Feb 26, 1994		at Virginia	W 63–45	18–9 (8–6)	University Hall; Charlottesville, Virginia
Mar 2, 1994		No. 5 North Carolina; Rivalry	W 68–61	19–9 (9–6)	LJVM Coliseum; Winston-Salem, North Carolina
Mar 5, 1994		at NC State	L 63–71	19–10 (9–7)	Reynolds Coliseum; Raleigh, North Carolina
ACC Tournament
Mar 11, 1994*	(3)	vs. (6) Georgia Tech; ACC Tournament Quarterfinal	W 74–49	20–10	Bojangles Coliseum; Charlotte, North Carolina
Mar 12, 1994*	(3)	vs. (2) No. 4 North Carolina; ACC Tournament Semifinal	L 84–86 ^{OT}	20–11	Bojangles Coliseum; Charlotte, North Carolina
NCAA Tournament
Mar 17, 1994*	(5 SE)	vs. (12 SE) College of Charleston; First round	W 68–58	21–11	Rupp Arena; Lexington, Kentucky
Mar 19, 1994*	(5 SE)	vs. (4 SE) No. 13 Kansas; Second round	L 58–69	21–12	Rupp Arena; Lexington, Kentucky
*Non-conference game. ^{#}Rankings from AP Poll. (#) Tournament seedings in parentheses. SE=Southeast. All times are in Eastern.

== Awards and honors ==
- Dave Odom – ACC Coach of the Year
