= 1993–94 UMass Minutemen basketball team =

American college basketball season

1993–94 UMass Minutemen basketball
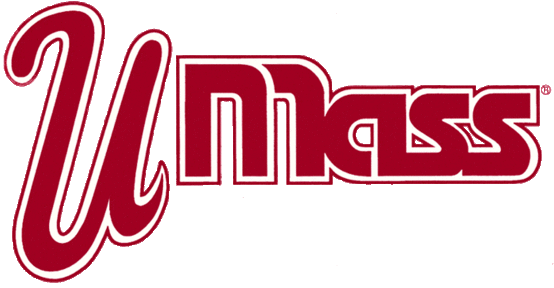

Atlantic 10 Regular Season Champions Atlantic 10 tournament champions

NCAA tournament, Round of 32
- Conference: Atlantic 10 Conference

Ranking
- Coaches: No. 15
- AP: No. 8
- Record: 28-7 (14-2 A-10)
- Head coach: John Calipari (6th season)
- Assistant coaches: Bruiser Flint; Bill Bayno; John Robic
- Home arena: William D. Mullins Memorial Center

1993–94 Atlantic 10 men's basketball standings
	Conf.				Overall
Team	W		L	PCT	W		L	PCT
No. 8 UMass †	14	–	2	.875	28	–	7	.800
No. 12 Temple	12	–	4	.750	23	–	8	.742
George Washington	8	–	8	.500	18	–	12	.600
West Virginia	8	–	8	.500	17	–	12	.586
Duquesne	8	–	8	.500	17	–	13	.567
Rhode Island	7	–	9	.438	11	–	16	.407
Rutgers	6	–	10	.375	11	–	16	.407
Saint Joseph's	5	–	11	.313	14	–	14	.500
St. Bonaventure	4	–	12	.250	10	–	17	.370
† 1994 Atlantic 10 Tournament winner Rankings from AP Poll

The 1993–94 UMass Minutemen basketball team represented the University of Massachusetts Amherst during the 1993–94 NCAA Division I men's basketball season. The Minutemen, led by sixth year head coach John Calipari, played their home games at William D. Mullins Memorial Center and were members of the Atlantic 10 Conference. They finished the season 28–7, 14–2 in A-10 play to finish in first place.

== Roster ==
1991–92 UMass Minutemen men's basketball team
Players
Coaches

Pos.	#	Name	Height	Weight	Year	Hometown
G/F	3	Dana Dingle	6 ft 6 in (1.98 m)	210 lb (95 kg)	So	Bronx, New York
G/F	4	Donta Bright	6 ft 6 in (1.98 m)	205 lb (93 kg)	So	Baltimore, Maryland
G	5	Jason Germain	6 ft 1 in (1.85 m)	160 lb (73 kg)	Jr	South Hadley, Massachusetts
G	10	Mike Williams	6 ft 2 in (1.88 m)	180 lb (82 kg)	Jr	Hartford, Connecticut
G	11	Craig Berry	6 ft 1 in (1.85 m)	195 lb (88 kg)	Sr	Cambridge, Massachusetts
G	12	Edgar Padilla	6 ft 1 in (1.85 m)	165 lb (75 kg)	Fr	Toa Alta, Puerto Rico
G	14	Derek Kellogg	6 ft 3 in (1.91 m)	185 lb (84 kg)	Jr	Springfield, Massachusetts
F	15	Lou Roe	6 ft 7 in (2.01 m)	215 lb (98 kg)	Jr	Atlantic City, New Jersey
F/C	21	Marcus Camby	6 ft 11 in (2.11 m)	215 lb (98 kg)	Fr	Hartford, Connecticut
G	24	Carmelo Travieso	6 ft 2 in (1.88 m)	165 lb (75 kg)	Fr	Boston, Massachusetts
C	33	Jeff Meyer	7 ft 2 in (2.18 m)	255 lb (116 kg)	Jr	Wausau, Wisconsin
F/C	40	Tedd Cottrell	6 ft 9 in (2.06 m)	190 lb (86 kg)	So	Annapolis, Maryland
F	44	Rigoberto Nuñez	6 ft 7 in (2.01 m)	190 lb (86 kg)	So	Lawrence, Massachusetts

Head coach

- John Calipari (Clarion)

Assistant coach(es)

- Bruiser Flint (Saint Joseph's)
- Bill Bayno (Sacred Heart)
- John Robic (Denison)

Legend

- (C) Team captain
- (S) Suspended
- (I) Ineligible
- (W) Walk-on
- Injured
- Current redshirt

== Schedule ==
Date time, TV	Rank^{#}	Opponent^{#}	Result	Record	Site city, state
Regular season
11/18/1993*	No. 22	Cleveland State; Preseason NIT	W 68-60	1–0	William D. Mullins Memorial Center; Amherst, Massachusetts
11/20/1993*	No. 22	Towson State; Preseason NIT	W 82-55	2–0	Mullins Center; Amherst, Massachusetts
11/24/1993*	No. 18	vs. No. 1 North Carolina; Preseason NIT	W 91-86 ^{OT}	3–0	Madison Square Garden; New York, New York
11/26/1993*	No. 18	vs. No. 6 Kansas; Preseason NIT	L 75–86	3–1	Madison Square Garden; New York, New York
11/28/1993*	No. 18	at Oklahoma	W 84-83	4–1	Lloyd Noble Center; Norman, Oklahoma
12/04/1993	No. 9	at St. Bonaventure	W 86-66	5–1 (1–0)	Reilly Center; Olean, New York
12/09/1993*	No. 8	Central Connecticut	W 90-63	6–1	Mullins Center; Amherst, Massachusetts
12/11/1993*	No. 8	at Holy Cross	W 97-80	7–1	Worcester Centrum; Worcester, Massachusetts
12/28/1993*	No. 9	vs. Hartford; Abdow's Hall of Fame Holiday Classic	W 91-62	8–1	Springfield Civic Center; Springfield, Massachusetts
12/29/1993*	No. 9	vs. Maryland; Abdow's Hall of Fame Holiday Classic	W 94-80	9–1	Springfield Civic Center; Springfield, Massachusetts
01/04/1994	No. 8	at Rutgers	W 71-59	10–1 (2–0)	Louis Brown Athletic Center; Piscataway, New Jersey
01/08/1994	No. 8	at Duquesne	W 70-53	11–1 (3–0)	Palumbo Center; Pittsburgh, Pennsylvania
01/13/1994	No. 7	at No. 23 West Virginia	W 70-56	12–1 (4–0)	WVU Coliseum; Morgantown, West Virginia
01/15/1994	No. 7	St. Bonaventure	W 87-60	13–1 (5–0)	Mullins Center; Amherst, Massachusetts
1/18/1994*	No. 6	at DePaul	L 76-78	13–2	Rosemont Horizon; Rosemont, Illinois
01/20/1994	No. 6	Rutgers	W 76-54	14–2 (6–0)	Mullins Center; Amherst, MA
01/22/1994	No. 6	George Washington	W 56-55	15–2 (7–0)	Mullins Center; Amherst, Massachusetts
01/27/1994*	No. 8	at Cincinnati	L 74-76	15–3	Myrl H. Shoemaker Center; Cincinnati, Ohio
01/30/1994	No. 8	Rhode Island	W 76-47	16–3 (8–0)	Mullins Center; Amherst, Massachusetts
02/03/1994	No. 11	Florida State	W 62-58	17–3	Mullins Center; Amherst, Massachusetts
02/06/1994*	No. 11	vs. No. 3 Kentucky	L 64-67	17–4	Brendan Byrne Arena; East Rutherford, New Jersey
02/10/1994	No. 13	at Rhode Island	W 70-64	18–4 (9–0)	Providence Civic Center; Providence, Rhode Island
02/13/1994	No. 13	No. 8 Temple	W 56-55	19–4 (10–0)	Mullins Center; Amherst, Massachusetts
02/15/1994	No. 10	at Saint Joseph's	L 80-81	19–5 (10–1)	Alumni Memorial Fieldhouse; Philadelphia, Pennsylvania
02/18/1994*	No. 10	Manhattan	W 68-54	20–5	Mullins Center; Amherst, Massachusetts
02/20/1994	No. 10	West Virginia	W 74-67	21–5 (11–1)	Mullins Center; Amherst, Massachusetts
02/22/1994	No. 11	St. Joseph's	W 99-73	22–5 (12–1)	Mullins Center; Amherst, Massachusetts
2/24/1994	No. 11	at No. 8 Temple	W 51-50	23–5 (13–1)	McGonigle Hall; Philadelphia, Pennsylvania
02/27/1994	No. 11	at George Washington	L 66-77	23–6 (13–2)	Charles E. Smith Center; Washington, D.C.
03/02/1994	No. 11	Duquesne	W 92-78	24–6 (14–2)	Mullins Center; Amherst, Massachusetts
1994 Atlantic 10 men's basketball tournament
03/06/1994	No. 11	vs. St. Joseph's; Quarterfinal	W 74-58	25–6	The Palestra; Philadelphia, Pennsylvania
03/07/1994	No. 9	vs. Duquesne; Semifinals	W 69-52	26–6	The Palestra; Philadelphia, Pennsylvania
03/10/1994	No. 9	No. 12 Temple; Final	W 70-59	27–6	Mullins Center; Amherst, Massachusetts
1994 NCAA Division I men's basketball tournament
03/17/1995*	(2 MW) No. 8	vs. (15 MW) Southwest Texas State; Midwest Region First Round	W 78-60	28–6	Kansas Coliseum; Wichita, Kansas
03/19/1994*	(2 MW) No. 8	vs. (10 MW) Maryland; Midwest Region Second Round	L 87-95	28–7	Kansas Coliseum; Wichita, Kansas
*Non-conference game. ^{#}Rankings from AP Poll. (#) Tournament seedings in parentheses. MW=Midwest. All times are in Eastern Time.
