= 1993–94 Liberty Flames basketball team =

American college basketball season

1993–94 Liberty Flames men's basketball
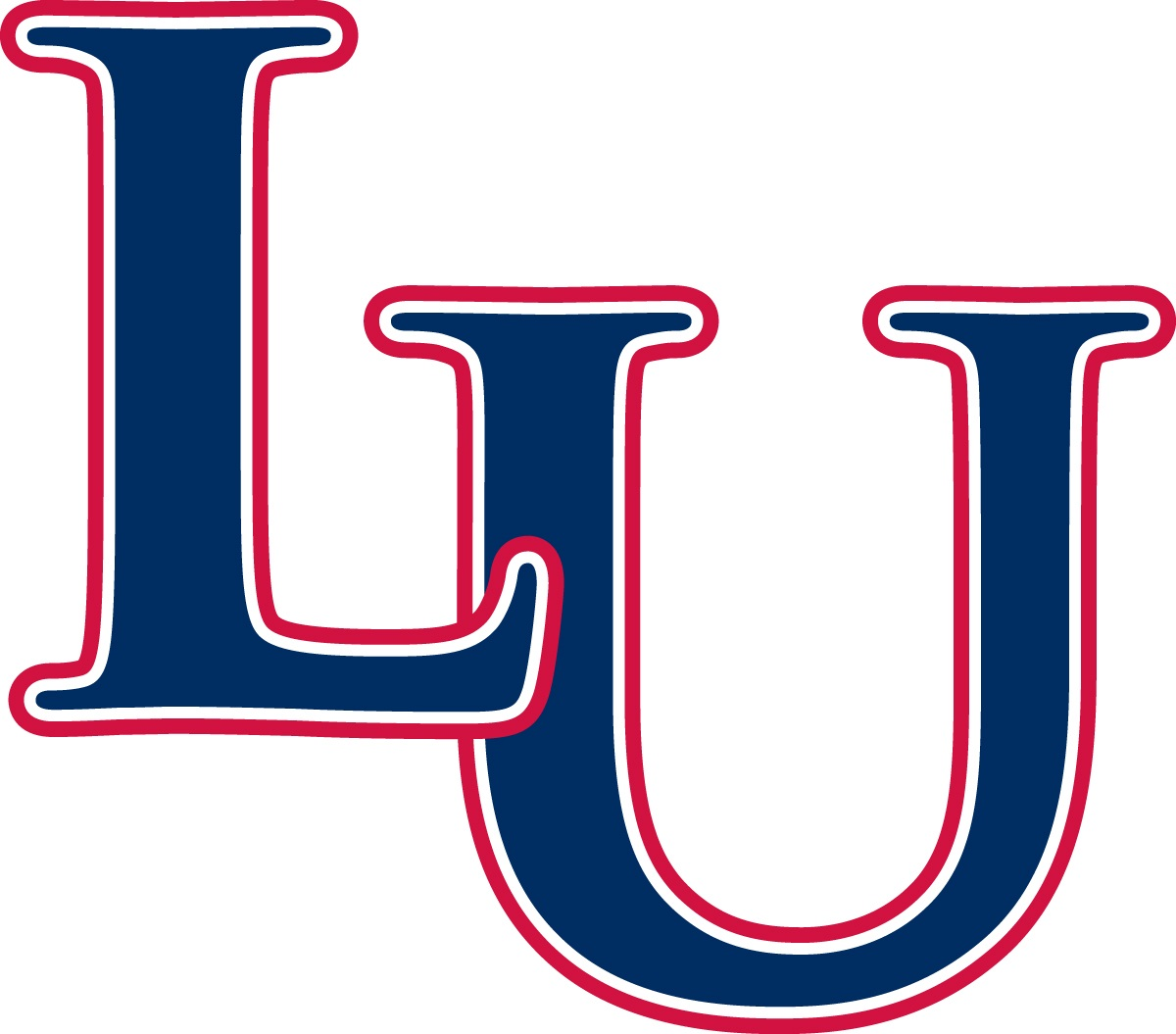

Big South tournament champions

NCAA tournament, First round
- Conference: Big South Conference
- Record: 18–12 (12–6 Big South)
- Head coach: Jeff Meyer (13th season)
- Home arena: Vines Center

1993–94 Big South Conference men's basketball standings
	Conf.				Overall
Team	W		L	PCT	W		L	PCT
Towson State	15	–	3	.833	21	–	9	.700
Radford	13	–	5	.722	20	–	8	.714
Campbell	13	–	5	.722	20	–	9	.690
Liberty †	12	–	6	.667	18	–	12	.600
UNC Greensboro	11	–	7	.611	15	–	12	.556
Coastal Carolina	10	–	8	.556	15	–	11	.577
Charleston Southern	7	–	11	.389	9	–	18	.333
UMBC	5	–	13	.278	6	–	21	.222
Winthrop	3	–	15	.167	4	–	23	.148
UNC Asheville	3	–	15	.167	3	–	24	.111
† 1994 Big South tournament winner Rankings from AP Poll

The 1993–94 Liberty Flames basketball team represented Liberty University during the 1993–94 NCAA Division I men's basketball season. The Flames, led by 13th-year head coach Jeff Meyer, played their home games at the Vines Center and were members of the North Division of the Big South Conference. The team finished second in the regular season standings, and won the Big South tournament to earn an automatic bid to the NCAA Tournament. Playing as the No. 16 seed in the East region, Liberty lost in the first round to North Carolina, 71–51. The team finished the season with an 18–12 record (12–6 in the Big South; later adjusted to 14–4).

== Roster ==
1993–94 Liberty Flames men's basketball team
Players
Coaches

Pos.	#	Name	Height	Weight	Year	Hometown
C	0	Peter Aluma	6 ft 10 in (2.08 m)	225 lb (102 kg)	Fr	Lagos, Nigeria
F	3	Jeremy Luther	6 ft 6 in (1.98 m)	180 lb (82 kg)	So	Fort Washington, Maryland
G	4	Eric Pothoven	6 ft 2 in (1.88 m)	175 lb (79 kg)	So	Pella, Iowa
F	5	Darryl Williams	6 ft 5 in (1.96 m)	210 lb (95 kg)	Sr	Richmond, Virginia
G	10	Chris Toomer	6 ft 1 in (1.85 m)	175 lb (79 kg)	Sr	Anchorage, Alaska
G	20	Matthew Hildebrand	6 ft 2 in (1.88 m)	165 lb (75 kg)	Sr	Sturgis, Michigan
G	21	Brett Anthony	6 ft 2 in (1.88 m)	180 lb (82 kg)	Sr	Winter Park, Florida
F	24	Eric Sorenson	6 ft 6 in (1.98 m)	200 lb (91 kg)	Fr	Staten Island, New York
G/F	32	Kevin Benton	6 ft 6 in (1.98 m)	175 lb (79 kg)	Jr	Philadelphia, Pennsylvania
F	33	Darrius Hunter	6 ft 8 in (2.03 m)	220 lb (100 kg)	Sr	Portsmouth, Virginia
F	40	Darren Hall	6 ft 7 in (2.01 m)	225 lb (102 kg)	Fr	Davidsonville, Maryland
C	42	Jason Dixon	6 ft 9 in (2.06 m)	225 lb (102 kg)	Jr	Aurora, Colorado
G	44	Mark Reed	6 ft 3 in (1.91 m)	185 lb (84 kg)	Fr	Bangor, Maine
F	45	Jody Chapman	6 ft 7 in (2.01 m)	205 lb (93 kg)	Sr	Charlotte, North Carolina

Head coach

- Jeff Meyer

Assistant coach(es)

Legend

- (C) Team captain
- (S) Suspended
- (I) Ineligible
- (W) Walk-on
- Injured
- Current redshirt

Roster

== Schedule ==
Date time, TV	Rank^{#}	Opponent^{#}	Result	Record	Site (attendance) city, state
Regular season
Dec 4, 1993*		VCU	L 68–93	0–1	Vines Center; Lynchburg, Virginia
Dec 6, 1993*		Central Connecticut State	W 82–69	1–1	Vines Center; Lynchburg, Virginia
Dec 10, 1993*		Montreat Anderson	W 70–57	2–1	Vines Center; Lynchburg, Virginia
Dec 18, 1993*		Averett	W 96–56	3–1	Vines Center; Lynchburg, Virginia
Dec 21, 1993*		at Western Michigan	L 63–72	3–2	Lawson Arena; Kalamazoo, Michigan
Dec 30, 1993*		at Virginia	L 49–62	3–3	University Hall; Charlottesville, Virginia
Jan 4, 1994*		at James Madison	L 64–78	3–4	JMU Convocation Center; Harrisonburg, Virginia
Jan 8, 1994		UMBC	W 89–79	4–4 (1–0)	Vines Center; Lynchburg, Virginia
Jan 10, 1994		Towson State	L 61–66	4–5 (1–1)	Vines Center; Lynchburg, Virginia
Jan 13, 1994		at UNC Asheville	W 79–71	5–5 (2–1)	Justice Center; Asheville, North Carolina
Jan 16, 1994		at Radford	L 68–82	5–6 (2–2)	Dedmon Center; Radford, Virginia
Jan 18, 1994*		at Virginia Tech	L 65–81	5–7	Cassell Coliseum; Blacksburg, Virginia
Jan 20, 1994		Winthrop	W 85–61	6–7 (3–2)	Vines Center; Lynchburg, Virginia
Jan 22, 1994		at Charleston Southern	W 71–67	7–7 (4–2)	Buccaneer Field House; Charleston, South Carolina
Jan 24, 1994		at Coastal Carolina	L 75–86	7–8 (4–3)	Kimbel Arena; Conway, South Carolina
Jan 27, 1994		at Campbell	L 60–63	7–9 (4–4)	Carter Gymnasium; Buies Creek, North Carolina
Jan 31, 1994		UNC Greensboro	W 74–64	8–9 (5–4)	Vines Center; Lynchburg, Virginia
Feb 3, 1994		Campbell	W 60–55	9–9 (6–4)	Vines Center; Lynchburg, Virginia
Feb 5, 1994		UMBC	W 75–64	10–9 (7–4)	Retriever Activities Center; Catonsville, Maryland
Feb 7, 1994		at Towson State	L 78–79 ^{OT}	10–10 (7–5)	Towson Center; Baltimore, Maryland
Feb 10, 1994		UNC Asheville	W 56–51	11–10 (8–5)	Vines Center; Lynchburg, Virginia
Feb 12, 1994		at UNC Greensboro	W 65–63	12–10 (9–5)	Bodford Arena; Greensboro, North Carolina
Feb 16, 1994		at Winthrop	W 81–72	13–10 (10–5)	Winthrop Coliseum; Rock Hill, South Carolina
Feb 19, 1994		Charleston Southern	W 90–81	14–10 (11–5)	Vines Center; Lynchburg, Virginia
Feb 21, 1994		Coastal Carolina	L 81–84	14–11 (11–6)	Vines Center; Lynchburg, Virginia
Feb 26, 1994		Radford	W 75–73	15–11 (12–6)	Vines Center; Lynchburg, Virginia
Big South tournament
Mar 4, 1994*	(4)	at (5) Charleston Southern; Quarterfinals	W 82–71	16–11	North Charleston Coliseum; North Charleston, South Carolina
Mar 5, 1994*	(4)	vs. (1) Towson State; Semifinals	W 63–58	17–11	North Charleston Coliseum; North Charleston, South Carolina
Mar 6, 1994*	(4)	vs. (2) Campbell; Championship game	W 76–62	18–11	North Charleston Coliseum; North Charleston, South Carolina
NCAA tournament
Mar 18, 1994*	(16 E)	vs. (1 E) No. 1 North Carolina; First round	L 51–71	18–12	USAir Arena; Landover, Maryland
*Non-conference game. ^{#}Rankings from AP Poll. (#) Tournament seedings in parentheses. All times are in Eastern Time. (#) during NCAA Tournament is seed with Region E=East.
