= 1993–94 UAB Blazers men's basketball team =

American college basketball season

1993–94 UAB Blazers men's basketball

NCAA tournament, 1st round
- Conference: Great Midwest Conference
- Record: 22–8 (8–4 GMWC)
- Head coach: Gene Bartow (16th season)
- Assistant coach: Murry Bartow
- Home arena: UAB Arena

1993–94 Great Midwest Conference men's basketball standings
	Conf.				Overall
Team	W		L	PCT	W		L	PCT
No. 21 Marquette	10	–	2	.833	24	–	9	.727
No. 24 Saint Louis	8	–	4	.667	23	–	6	.793
UAB	8	–	4	.667	22	–	8	.733
No. 25 Cincinnati †	7	–	5	.583	22	–	10	.688
DePaul	4	–	8	.333	16	–	12	.571
Memphis State	4	–	8	.333	13	–	16	.448
Dayton	1	–	11	.083	6	–	21	.222
† 1994 GMC tournament winner Rankings from AP Poll

The 1993–94 UAB Blazers men's basketball team represented the University of Alabama at Birmingham as a member of the Great Midwest Conference during the 1993–94 NCAA Division I men's basketball season. This was head coach Gene Bartow's 16th season at UAB, and the Blazers played their home games at UAB Arena. They finished the season 22–8, 8–4 in GMWC play and lost in the semifinals of the 1994 GMWC tournament. They received an at-large bid to the NCAA tournament as No. 7 seed in the East region. The Blazers were defeated by No. 10 seed George Washington, 51–46.

== Roster ==
1993–94 UAB Blazers men's basketball team
Players
Coaches

Pos.	#	Name	Height	Weight	Year	Previous school	Hometown
G	3	Carter Long	6 ft 4 in (1.93 m)	190 lb (86 kg)	Sr	Winfield	Winfield, Alabama
G	10	Chad Jones	6 ft 4 in (1.93 m)	165 lb (75 kg)	Fr	Vestavia Hills	Birmingham, Alabama
G	12	Corey Jackson	6 ft 2 in (1.88 m)	195 lb (88 kg)	Jr	Auburn	Auburn, Alabama
G/F	23	Robert Shannon	6 ft 8 in (2.03 m)	190 lb (86 kg)	Sr	Jackson	Jackson, Georgia
G	24	George Wilkerson	6 ft 3 in (1.91 m)	195 lb (88 kg)	Sr	P.D. Jackson-Olin	Birmingham, Alabama
G	25	Frank Haywood	6 ft 5 in (1.96 m)	195 lb (88 kg)	Sr	A. H. Parker	Birmingham, Alabama
F	31	Reginald Allen	6 ft 6 in (1.98 m)	205 lb (93 kg)	Sr	Benjamin Russell	Alexander City, Alabama
F	42	Travis Harper	6 ft 8 in (2.03 m)	240 lb (109 kg)	So	George Washington Carver	Columbus, Georgia
F	44	Carlos Browning	6 ft 10 in (2.08 m)	205 lb (93 kg)	So	Selma	Selma, Alabama
C	52	Clarence Thrash	6 ft 8 in (2.03 m)	250 lb (113 kg)	Sr	Westlake	Atlanta, Georgia
F	55	Jeremy Bearden	6 ft 8 in (2.03 m)	230 lb (104 kg)	Fr	Glendale	Brookside, Alabama

Head coach

- Gene Bartow

Assistant coach(es)

- Murry Bartow

Legend

- (C) Team captain
- (S) Suspended
- (I) Ineligible
- (W) Walk-on
- Injured
- Current redshirt

Roster
Last update: July 2, 2021

== Schedule and results ==
Date time, TV	Rank^{#}	Opponent^{#}	Result	Record	Site (attendance) city, state
Regular season
Nov 27, 1993*		Texas–Arlington	W 68–61	1–0	UAB Arena (5,722); Birmingham, Alabama
Nov 30, 1993*		Alabama State	W 87–72	2–0	UAB Arena (6,723); Birmingham, Alabama
Dec 4, 1993*		at No. 7 Temple	L 52–55	2–1	McGonigle Hall (3,864); Philadelphia, Pennsylvania
Dec 7, 1993*		at Mississippi State	W 66–63 ^{OT}	3–1	Humphrey Coliseum (4,608); Starkville, Mississippi
Dec 10, 1993*		vs. Tennessee State; United Airlines Tip-Off Tournament	W 70–52	4–1	Neal S. Blaisdell Center (1,000); Honolulu, Hawaii
Dec 11, 1993*		at Hawaii; United Airlines Tip-Off Tournament	W 79–59	5–1	Neal S. Blaisdell Center (2,981); Honolulu, Hawaii
Dec 16, 1993*		at Auburn	W 69–65	6–1	Beard–Eaves–Memorial Coliseum (6,000); Auburn, Alabama
Dec 18, 1993*		Mississippi Valley State	W 76–57	7–1	UAB Arena (5,947); Birmingham, Alabama
Dec 21, 1993*		South Alabama	W 80–64	8–1	UAB Arena (5,632); Birmingham, Alabama
Dec 31, 1993*		South Florida	W 78–41	9–1	UAB Arena (5,112); Birmingham, Alabama
Jan 3, 1994*		No. 25 Western Kentucky	W 62–51	10–1	UAB Arena (6,232); Birmingham, Alabama
Jan 9, 1994		at No. 17 Cincinnati	W 67–65	11–1 (1–0)	Myrl H. Shoemaker Center (13,176); Cincinnati, Ohio
Jan 12, 1994*	No. 22	Sacramento State	W 88–46	12–1	UAB Arena (5,447); Birmingham, Alabama
Jan 16, 1994	No. 22	Memphis State	W 85–57	13–1 (2–0)	UAB Arena (8,367); Birmingham, Alabama
Jan 19, 1994	No. 18	Marquette	L 58–60	13–2 (2–1)	UAB Arena (8,340); Birmingham, Alabama
Jan 22, 1994*	No. 18	at Rhode Island	W 71–63	14–2	UAB Arena (6,984); Birmingham, Alabama
Jan 26, 1994	No. 20	DePaul	W 62–59	15–2 (3–1)	UAB Arena (8,550); Birmingham, Alabama
Jan 30, 1994	No. 20	at Dayton	W 60–52	16–2 (4–1)	University of Dayton Arena (10,046); Dayton, Ohio
Feb 2, 1994	No. 17	at Marquette	L 54–58	16–3 (4–2)	Bradley Center (13,238); Milwaukee, Wisconsin
Feb 5, 1994	No. 17	No. 25 Cincinnati	W 83–67	17–3 (5–2)	UAB Arena (8,907); Birmingham, Alabama
Feb 9, 1994	No. 19	at DePaul	W 78–73	18–3 (6–2)	Rosemont Horizon (7,507); Rosemont, Illinois
Feb 12, 1994	No. 19	at Memphis State	L 53–58	18–4 (6–3)	The Pyramid (10,041); Memphis, Tennessee
Feb 16, 1994*	No. 21	at Tulane	L 60–66	18–5	Avron B. Fogelman Arena (3,249); New Orleans, Louisiana
Feb 19, 1994	No. 21	at No. 18 Saint Louis	L 72–73 ^{OT}	18–6 (6–4)	St. Louis Arena (18,033); St. Louis, Missouri
Feb 24, 1994*		Southern	W 83–61	19–6	UAB Arena (5,321); Birmingham, Alabama
Feb 26, 1994*		Cal State Northridge	W 80–43	20–6	UAB Arena (3,963); Birmingham, Alabama
Mar 3, 1994	No. 24	Dayton	W 84–53	21–6 (7–4)	UAB Arena (5,348); Birmingham, Alabama
Mar 5, 1994	No. 24	No. 16 Saint Louis	W 85–70	22–6 (8–4)	UAB Arena (8,017); Birmingham, Alabama
GMWC tournament
Mar 10, 1994*	(3) No. 22	vs. (6) Memphis State; Semifinals	L 86–91	22–7	Myrl H. Shoemaker Center (5,000); Cincinnati, Ohio
NCAA tournament
Mar 17, 1994*	(7 E)	vs. (10 E) George Washington; First round	L 46–51	22–8	Nassau Coliseum (16,204); Uniondale, New York
*Non-conference game. ^{#}Rankings from AP poll. (#) Tournament seedings in parentheses. E=East. All times are in Central Time.
