= 1994 Great Midwest Conference men's basketball tournament =

- Classification: Division I
- Season: 1993–94
- Teams: 7
- Site: Shoemaker Stadium; Cincinnati, Ohio
- Champions: Cincinnati (3rd title)
- Winning coach: Bob Huggins (3rd title)

1993–94 Great Midwest Conference men's basketball standings
| | Conf. | | | | Overall |
| Team | W | | L | PCT | W | | L | PCT |
|---|---|---|---|---|---|---|---|---|
| No. 21 Marquette | 10 | – | 2 | .833 | 24 | – | 9 | .727 |
| No. 24 Saint Louis | 8 | – | 4 | .667 | 23 | – | 6 | .793 |
| UAB | 8 | – | 4 | .667 | 22 | – | 8 | .733 |
| No. 25 Cincinnati † | 7 | – | 5 | .583 | 22 | – | 10 | .688 |
| DePaul | 4 | – | 8 | .333 | 16 | – | 12 | .571 |
| Memphis State | 4 | – | 8 | .333 | 13 | – | 16 | .448 |
| Dayton | 1 | – | 11 | .083 | 6 | – | 21 | .222 |
† 1994 GMC tournament winner Rankings from AP Poll

The 1994 Great Midwest Conference men's basketball tournament was held March 10–12, 1994. Although its winner did not receive an automatic bid to the 1994 NCAA tournament, the tournament champion, Cincinnati, received an at-large bid.

== Bracket and results ==
Quarterfinals; Thursday, March 10
4 | Cincinnati | 95
5 | DePaul | 86
2 | #21 Saint Louis | 80
7 | Dayton | 46
3 | #22 UAB | 86
6 | Memphis State | 91

Semifinals; Friday, March 11
1 | #19 Marquette | 63
4 | Cincinnati | 72
2 | #21 Saint Louis | 62
6 | Memphis State | 73

Final; Saturday, March 12
4 | Cincinnati | 68
6 | Memphis State | 47
