= 1993–94 Saint Louis Billikens men's basketball team =

American college basketball season

1993–94 Saint Louis Billikens men's basketball
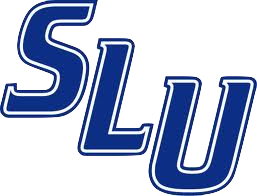

NCAA tournament, first round
- Conference: Great Midwest Conference

Ranking
- AP: No. 24
- Record: 23–6 (8–4 GMC)
- Head coach: Charlie Spoonhour (2nd season)
- Assistant coaches: Greg Lackey; Kelvin Lee; Randy Stange
- Home arena: St. Louis Arena

1993–94 Great Midwest Conference men's basketball standings
	Conf.				Overall
Team	W		L	PCT	W		L	PCT
No. 21 Marquette	10	–	2	.833	24	–	9	.727
No. 24 Saint Louis	8	–	4	.667	23	–	6	.793
UAB	8	–	4	.667	22	–	8	.733
No. 25 Cincinnati †	7	–	5	.583	22	–	10	.688
DePaul	4	–	8	.333	16	–	12	.571
Memphis State	4	–	8	.333	13	–	16	.448
Dayton	1	–	11	.083	6	–	21	.222
† 1994 GMC tournament winner Rankings from AP Poll

The 1993–94 Saint Louis Billikens men's basketball team represented Saint Louis University in the 1993–94 NCAA Division I men's basketball season. The Billikens were led by head coach Charlie Spoonhour who was in his second season at Saint Louis. The team played their home games at St. Louis Arena and were a member of the Great Midwest Conference. The Billikens finished the season 23–6, 8–4 in GMC play to finish 2nd. They lost in the semifinal round of the GMC tournament, but received an at-large bid to the NCAA tournament as No. 7 seed in the Midwest region. The Billikens were defeated by No. 10 seed Maryland in the second round.

== Roster ==
1993–94 Saint Louis Billikens men's basketball team
Players
Coaches

Pos.	#	Name	Height	Weight	Year	Previous school	Hometown
G	10	Carl Turner	5 ft 11 in (1.8 m)	165 lb (75 kg)	Jr	DuVal	Suitland, Maryland
G	12	Carlos McCauley	5 ft 11 in (1.8 m)	165 lb (75 kg)	So	Charleston	Charleston, Missouri
G	13	Erwin Claggett	6 ft 1 in (1.85 m)	185 lb (84 kg)	Jr	Venice	Venice, Illinois
G	20	H Waldman	6 ft 3 in (1.91 m)	195 lb (88 kg)	Jr	Clark	Las Vegas, Nevada
G	22	Derek Falb	5 ft 10 in (1.78 m)	175 lb (79 kg)	So	Chaminade	St. Louis, Missouri
F	23	Corey Grays	6 ft 5 in (1.96 m)	205 lb (93 kg)	Jr	Central	San Angelo, Texas
F	30	David Robinson	6 ft 6 in (1.98 m)	210 lb (95 kg)	Jr	Rock Island	Rock Island, Illinois
G	32	Scott Highmark	6 ft 4 in (1.93 m)	180 lb (82 kg)	Jr	Parkway	St. Louis, Missouri
F	33	Eric Jones	6 ft 5 in (1.96 m)	210 lb (95 kg)	Jr	Hillsboro	Hillsboro, Kansas
F	34	Donnie Dobbs	6 ft 3 in (1.91 m)	220 lb (100 kg)	Sr	Macomber	Toledo, Ohio
F/C	40	Evan Pedersen	6 ft 8 in (2.03 m)	220 lb (100 kg)	Sr	Parkway	St. Louis, Missouri
F	42	Jeff Harris	6 ft 5 in (1.96 m)	225 lb (102 kg)	Fr	Parkview	Little Rock, Arkansas
F	44	Eric Bickel	6 ft 10 in (2.08 m)	225 lb (102 kg)	Jr	Ritenour	St. Louis, Missouri
F	45	Donnie Campbell	6 ft 6 in (1.98 m)	215 lb (98 kg)	RS Jr	Tucumcari	Tucumcari, New Mexico

Head coach

- Charlie Spoonhour

Assistant coach(es)

- Greg Lackey
- Kelvin Lee
- Randy Stange

Legend

- (C) Team captain
- (S) Suspended
- (I) Ineligible
- (W) Walk-on
- Injured
- Current redshirt

Roster

== Schedule and results ==
Date time, TV	Rank^{#}	Opponent^{#}	Result	Record	Site (attendance) city, state
Regular season
Nov 27, 1993*		Mercer	W 86–52	1–0	St. Louis Arena (7,978); St. Louis, Missouri
Dec 1, 1993*		at SMU	W 90–85 ^{OT}	2–0	Moody Coliseum (2,235); Dallas, Texas
Dec 4, 1993*		Cornell	W 84–47	3–0	St. Louis Arena (6,979); St. Louis, Missouri
Dec 6, 1993*		at Creighton	W 78–71	4–0	Omaha Civic Auditorium (2,294); Omaha, Nebraska
Dec 8, 1993*		Chicago State	W 97–69	5–0	St. Louis Arena (6,589); St. Louis, Missouri
Dec 15, 1993*		Augustana (IL)	W 97–64	6–0	St. Louis Arena (6,187); St. Louis, Missouri
Dec 18, 1993*		at Murray State	W 92–89	7–0	Racer Arena (2,015); Murray, Kentucky
Dec 20, 1993*		Samford	W 70–68	8–0	St. Louis Arena (7,811); St. Louis, Missouri
Dec 30, 1993*		Southern Illinois	W 100–87	9–0	St. Louis Arena (17,117); St. Louis, Missouri
Jan 2, 1994*		Detroit	W 91–77	10–0	St. Louis Arena (7,482); St. Louis, Missouri
Jan 5, 1994*		SW Missouri State	W 81–48	11–0	St. Louis Arena (13,854); St. Louis, Missouri
Jan 8, 1994*		vs. Arizona State	W 77–75	12–0	McKale Center (2,423); Tucson, Arizona
Jan 11, 1994		Memphis State	W 86–59	13–0 (1–0)	St. Louis Arena (18,073); St. Louis, Missouri
Jan 15, 1994		at DePaul	W 80–71	14–0 (2–0)	Rosemont Horizon (9,120); Rosemont, Illinois
Jan 22, 1994	No. 23	at Marquette	L 52–62	14–1 (2–1)	Bradley Center (16,354); Milwaukee, Wisconsin
Jan 26, 1994	No. 23	No. 22 Marquette	W 76–66	15–1 (3–1)	St. Louis Arena (18,158); St. Louis, Missouri
Jan 29, 1994*	No. 23	at UMKC	W 83–71	16–1	Municipal Auditorium (6,348); Kansas City, Missouri
Feb 2, 1994	No. 18	Dayton	W 94–75	17–1 (4–1)	St. Louis Arena (14,791); St. Louis, Missouri
Feb 6, 1994	No. 18	DePaul	W 91–81	18–1 (5–1)	St. Louis Arena (17,209); St. Louis, Missouri
Feb 9, 1994*	No. 17	Iowa State	W 90–75	19–1	St. Louis Arena (16,453); St. Louis, Missouri
Feb 13, 1994	No. 17	at Dayton	L 77–82 ^{OT}	19–2 (5–2)	UD Arena (10,432); Dayton, Ohio
Feb 16, 1994	No. 18	at No. 23 Cincinnati	L 73–78	19–3 (5–3)	Myrl H. Shoemaker Center (13,176); Cincinnati, Ohio
Feb 19, 1994	No. 18	No. 21 UAB	W 73–72 ^{OT}	20–3 (6–3)	St. Louis Arena (18,033); St. Louis, Missouri
Feb 23, 1994	No. 19	Cincinnati	W 70–67	21–3 (7–3)	St. Louis Arena (18,411); St. Louis, Missouri
Feb 26, 1994	No. 19	at Memphis State	W 71–66	22–3 (8–3)	Pyramid Arena (10,645); Memphis, Tennessee
Mar 4, 1994	No. 16	at No. 24 UAB	L 70–85	22–4 (8–4)	UAB Arena (18,017); Birmingham, Alabama
GMWC tournament
Mar 10, 1994*	(2) No. 21	vs. (7) Dayton; Quarterfinals	W 80–46	23–4	Fifth Third Arena; Cincinnati, Ohio
Mar 11, 1994*	(2) No. 21	vs. (6) Memphis State; Semifinals	L 62–73	23–5	Fifth Third Arena; Cincinnati, Ohio
NCAA tournament
Mar 16, 1994*	(7 MW) No. 24	vs. (10 MW) Maryland; First Round	L 66–74	23–6	Kansas Coliseum; Wichita, Kansas
*Non-conference game. ^{#}Rankings from AP Poll. (#) Tournament seedings in parentheses. All times are in Central Time. (#) during NCAA Tournament is seed with Region MW=Midwest.
