= Erik Meek =

American retired professional basketball player

Personal information
- Born: January 17, 1973 (age 53) San Diego, California, U.S.
- Listed height: 6 ft 10.75 in (2.10 m)
- Listed weight: 245 lb (111 kg)

Career information
- High school: San Pasqual (Escondido, California)
- College: Duke (1991–1995)
- NBA draft: 1995: 2nd round, 41st overall pick
- Drafted by: Houston Rockets
- Playing career: 1995–2002
- Position: Power forward / center

Career history
- 1995–1996: Galatasaray
- 1996–1997: Iraklis
- 1997–1998: Apollon Patras
- 1998–1999: Maroussi
- 1999–2000: Peristeri
- 2000–2001: Real Madrid
- 2001–2002: Iraklis

Career highlights
- Greek League All-Star (1998); NCAA champion (1992); Second-team Parade All-American (1991)
- Stats at Basketball Reference

Erik Joal Meek (born January 17, 1973) is an American former professional basketball player who played for four seasons at Duke University.

== College career ==
Meek played college basketball for Duke from 1991 to 1995. He was part of the team that won the 1992 NCAA Tournament. During his junior season he achieved his career high in scoring with 21 points against Boston University. Meek was named captain of the Blue Devils for the 1994–95 season. During that season he appeared in 31 games averaging 10.3 points, 8.3 rebounds and 1.3 blocks per game on 28.7 minutes per game. He finished his career in Duke averaging 5.1 points, 4.3 rebounds and 0.6 blocks per game.

== Professional career ==
Meek was drafted 41st overall by the Houston Rockets, in the 1995 NBA draft. He did not play in the NBA, but he spent several years playing professionally in Europe.

== Personal life ==
Meek is the cousin of former Tampa Bay Rays closer Heath Bell.
