= 1993–94 Virginia Cavaliers men's basketball team =

American college basketball season

1993–94 Virginia Cavaliers men's basketball

NCAA tournament, Round of 32
- Conference: Atlantic Coast Conference
- Record: 18–13 (8–8 ACC)
- Head coach: Jeff Jones (4th season)
- Assistant coaches: Brian Ellerbe (4th season); Tom Perrin (7th season); Dennis Wolff (4th season)
- Home arena: University Hall

1993–94 ACC men's basketball standings
	Conf.				Overall
Team	W		L	PCT	W		L	PCT
No. 6 Duke	12	–	4	.750	28	–	6	.824
No. 1 North Carolina †	11	–	5	.688	28	–	7	.800
Wake Forest	9	–	7	.563	21	–	12	.636
Virginia	8	–	8	.500	18	–	13	.581
Maryland	8	–	8	.500	18	–	12	.600
Georgia Tech	7	–	9	.438	16	–	13	.552
Florida State	6	–	10	.375	13	–	14	.481
Clemson	6	–	10	.375	18	–	16	.529
NC State	5	–	11	.313	11	–	19	.367
† 1994 ACC tournament winner Rankings from AP poll

The 1993–94 Virginia Cavaliers men's basketball team represented University of Virginia as a member of the Atlantic Coast Conference during the 1994–95 NCAA Division I men's basketball season. The team was led by fourth-year head coach Jeff Jones. The Cavaliers earned an at-large bid to the NCAA tournament as No. 7 seed in the West region. They defeated No. 10 seed New Mexico in the opening round before falling to the No. 2 seed Arizona in the second round. The Cavaliers finished with a record of 18–13 (8–8 ACC).

== Roster ==
1993–94 Virginia Cavaliers men's basketball team
Players
Coaches

Pos.	#	Name	Height	Weight	Year	Hometown
PF	4	Junior Burrough	6 ft 8 in (2.03 m)	242 lb (110 kg)	Jr	Charlotte, North Carolina
G/F	5	Cornel Parker	6 ft 7 in (2.01 m)	189 lb (86 kg)	Sr	Norfolk, Virginia
PG	12	Cory Alexander	6 ft 1 in (1.85 m)	183 lb (83 kg)	So	Waynesboro, Virginia
G/F	13	Jamal Robinson	6 ft 7 in (2.01 m)	182 lb (83 kg)	Fr	Queens, New York
G	15	Chris Havilcek	6 ft 5 in (1.96 m)	201 lb (91 kg)	RS Sr	Weston, Massachusetts
G	21	Harold Deane	6 ft 1 in (1.85 m)	177 lb (80 kg)	Fr	Ettrick, Virginia
G/F	22	Jason Williford	6 ft 6 in (1.98 m)	212 lb (96 kg)	Jr	Richmond, Virginia
F/C	24	Yuri Barnes	6 ft 8 in (2.03 m)	231 lb (105 kg)	Jr	Richmond, Virginia
F/C	30	Chris Alexander	6 ft 9 in (2.06 m)	227 lb (103 kg)	RS So	Long Branch, New Jersey
G	31	Bobby Graves	6 ft 4 in (1.93 m)	187 lb (85 kg)	RS Jr	Herndon, Virginia
G	32	Mike Powell	6 ft 1 in (1.85 m)	171 lb (78 kg)	So	Forestville, Maryland
G/F	44	Maurice Watkins	6 ft 5 in (1.96 m)	199 lb (90 kg)	Fr	Petersburg, Virginia
F/C	52	Shawn Wilson	6 ft 11 in (2.11 m)	241 lb (109 kg)	RS Sr	Franklin, Tennessee
C		Mark Bogosh	7 ft 1 in (2.16 m)	234 lb (106 kg)	Jr	Hunt Valley, Maryland

Head coach

- Jeff Jones

Assistant coach(es)

- Brian Ellerbe
- Tom Perrin
- Dennis Wolff

Legend

- (C) Team captain
- (S) Suspended
- (I) Ineligible
- (W) Walk-on
- Injured
- Current redshirt

Roster

== Schedule and results ==
Date time, TV	Rank^{#}	Opponent^{#}	Result	Record	Site (attendance) city, state
Regular season
Nov 29, 1993*; WTNH	No. 12	Connecticut	L 36–77	0–1	University Hall (8,457); Charlottesville, Virginia
Dec 1, 1993*	No. 12	William & Mary	W 84–71	1–1	University Hall; Charlottesville, Virginia
Dec 4, 1993*	No. 12	Rice	W 59–51	2–1	University Hall; Charlottesville, Virginia
Dec 9, 1993*	No. 22	Coppin State	W 63–61	3–1	University Hall; Charlottesville, Virginia
Dec 11, 1993*	No. 22	at Old Dominion	L 69–76	3–2	Norfolk Scope; Norfolk, Virginia
Dec 22, 1993*		at Stanford	L 72–84	3–3	Maples Pavilion; Stanford, California
Dec 28, 1993*		No. 16 Minnesota	W 62–57	4–3	University Hall; Charlottesville, Virginia
Dec 30, 1993*		Liberty	W 62–49	5–3	University Hall; Charlottesville, Virginia
Jan 3, 1994*		at UNLV	W 59–39	6–3	Thomas & Mack Center; Paradise, Nevada
Jan 6, 1994		Florida State	W 84–64	7–3 (1–0)	University Hall; Charlottesville, Virginia
Jan 9, 1994		NC State	W 79–58	8–3 (2–0)	University Hall; Charlottesville, Virginia
Jan 12, 1994		at Clemson	W 64–57	9–3 (3–0)	Littlejohn Coliseum; Clemson, South Carolina
Jan 15, 1994		No. 2 Duke	L 58–66	9–4 (3–1)	University Hall; Charlottesville, Virginia
Jan 19, 1994		No. 4 North Carolina	W 81–77	10–4 (4–1)	University Hall; Charlottesville, Virginia
Jan 23, 1994		at No. 17 Georgia Tech	L 70–74	10–5 (4–2)	Alexander Memorial Coliseum; Atlanta, Georgia
Jan 26, 1994		at Wake Forest	W 61–59	11–5 (5–2)	Lawrence Joel Coliseum; Winston-Salem, North Carolina
Feb 2, 1994		No. 21 Maryland	W 73–66	12–5 (6–2)	University Hall; Charlottesville, Virginia
Feb 6, 1994		at Florida State	L 64–100	12–6 (6–3)	Donald L. Tucker Center; Tallahassee, Florida
Feb 9, 1994		at NC State	L 54–67	12–7 (6–4)	Reynolds Coliseum; Raleigh, North Carolina
Feb 12, 1994		Clemson	W 52–44	13–7 (7–4)	University Hall; Charlottesville, Virginia
Feb 16, 1994		at No. 6 Duke	L 54–84	13–8 (7–5)	Cameron Indoor Stadium; Durham, North Carolina
Feb 19, 1994		at No. 2 North Carolina	L 56–69	13–9 (7–6)	Dean Smith Center; Chapel Hill, North Carolina
Feb 22, 1994		No. 23 Georgia Tech	W 73–72 ^{OT}	14–9 (8–6)	University Hall; Charlottesville, Virginia
Feb 26, 1994		Wake Forest	L 45–63	14–10 (8–7)	University Hall; Charlottesville, Virginia
Mar 2, 1994*		vs. Virginia Tech	W 70-61	15-10	Roanoke Civic Center; Roanoke, Virginia
Mar 5, 1994		at Maryland	L 67–70	15–11 (8–8)	Cole Fieldhouse; College Park, Maryland
ACC Tournament
Mar 11, 1994*	(4)	vs. (5) Maryland; Quarterfinals	W 69–63	16–11	Charlotte Coliseum; Charlotte, North Carolina
Mar 12, 1994*	(4)	vs. (1) No. 5 Duke; Semifinals	W 66–61	17–11	Charlotte Coliseum; Charlotte, North Carolina
Mar 13, 1994*	(4)	vs. (2) No. 4 North Carolina; Championship game	L 66–73	17–12	Charlotte Coliseum; Charlotte, North Carolina
NCAA tournament
Mar 18, 1994*	(7 W)	vs. (10 W) New Mexico; First Round	W 57–54	18–12	ARCO Arena; Sacramento, California
Mar 20, 1994*	(7 W)	vs. (2 W) No. 9 Arizona; Second Round	L 58–71	18–13	ARCO Arena; Sacramento, California
*Non-conference game. ^{#}Rankings from AP poll. (#) Tournament seedings in parentheses. W=West. All times are in Eastern time.
