= 1994 ACC men's basketball tournament =

- Classification: Division I
- Season: 1993–94
- Teams: 9
- Site: Charlotte, North Carolina; Charlotte Coliseum
- Champions: North Carolina (13th title)
- Winning coach: Dean Smith (12th title)
- MVP: Jerry Stackhouse (North Carolina)

1993–94 ACC men's basketball standings
	Conf.				Overall
Team	W		L	PCT	W		L	PCT
No. 6 Duke	12	–	4	.750	28	–	6	.824
No. 1 North Carolina †	11	–	5	.688	28	–	7	.800
Wake Forest	9	–	7	.563	21	–	12	.636
Virginia	8	–	8	.500	18	–	13	.581
Maryland	8	–	8	.500	18	–	12	.600
Georgia Tech	7	–	9	.438	16	–	13	.552
Florida State	6	–	10	.375	13	–	14	.481
Clemson	6	–	10	.375	18	–	16	.529
NC State	5	–	11	.313	11	–	19	.367
† 1994 ACC tournament winner Rankings from AP poll

The 1994 Atlantic Coast Conference men's basketball tournament took place in Charlotte, North Carolina, at the second Charlotte Coliseum. North Carolina won the tournament, defeating Virginia, 73–66, in the championship game. Jerry Stackhouse of North Carolina was named tournament MVP.

== Bracket ==
First round March 10
8	Clemson	76
9	NC State	63

Quarterfinals; March 11
1	#5 Duke	77
8	Clemson	64
4	Virginia	69
5	Maryland	63
2	#4 North Carolina	83
7	Florida State	69
3	Wake Forest	74
6	Georgia Tech	49

Semifinals; March 12
1	#5 Duke	61
4	Virginia	66
2	#4 North Carolina	86
3	Wake Forest	84

Championship Game; March 13
4	Virginia	66
2	#4 North Carolina	73

AP rankings at time of tournament
