= 1993–94 Cincinnati Bearcats men's basketball team =

American college basketball season

1993–94 Cincinnati Bearcats men's basketball

Great Midwest Tournament champions

NCAA tournament
- Conference: Great Midwest Conference

Ranking
- AP: No. 25
- Record: 22–10 (7–5 Great Midwest)
- Head coach: Bob Huggins (5th season)
- Assistant coaches: Larry Harrison; Steve Moeller; John Loyer
- Home arena: Myrl Shoemaker Center

1993–94 Great Midwest Conference men's basketball standings
	Conf.				Overall
Team	W		L	PCT	W		L	PCT
No. 21 Marquette	10	–	2	.833	24	–	9	.727
No. 24 Saint Louis	8	–	4	.667	23	–	6	.793
UAB	8	–	4	.667	22	–	8	.733
No. 25 Cincinnati †	7	–	5	.583	22	–	10	.688
DePaul	4	–	8	.333	16	–	12	.571
Memphis State	4	–	8	.333	13	–	16	.448
Dayton	1	–	11	.083	6	–	21	.222
† 1994 GMC tournament winner Rankings from AP Poll

The 1993–94 Cincinnati Bearcats men's basketball team represented the University of Cincinnati in NCAA Division I competition in the 1993–94 season. The Bearcats, coached by Bob Huggins, finished 4th in the Great Midwest Conference, and were selected for an at-large bid to the 1994 NCAA tournament. The team finished with an overall record of 22–10 (7–5 GMWC).

== Roster ==
1993–94 Cincinnati Bearcats men's basketball team
Players
Coaches

Pos.	#	Name	Height	Weight	Year	Hometown
G	3	Damon Flint	6 ft 5 in (1.96 m)	—	Fr	Cincinnati
F	4	Dontonio Wingfield	6 ft 8 in (2.03 m)	250 lb (113 kg)	Fr	Albany, Georgia
G	20	David Evans	6 ft 2 in (1.88 m)	170 lb (77 kg)	Jr	Joliet, Illinois
G	23	LaZelle Durden	6 ft 2 in (1.88 m)	175 lb (79 kg)	Jr	Rossford, Ohio
F	21	Keith Gregor	6 ft 5 in (1.96 m)	205 lb (93 kg)	So	Cincinnati, Ohio
F	32	Mike Harris	6 ft 6 in (1.98 m)	218 lb (99 kg)	So	Brooklyn, New York
G	33	Darnell Burton	6 ft 2 in (1.88 m)	—	Fr	Lexington, Kentucky
F	43	Curtis Bostic	6 ft 5 in (1.96 m)	215 lb (98 kg)	Sr	Brockton, Massachusetts
F	54	Darrick Ford	6 ft 7 in (2.01 m)	235 lb (107 kg)	Jr	Lanham, Maryland

Head coach

- Bob Huggins (West Virginia)

Assistant coach(es)

- Larry Harrison (Pittsburgh)
- Steve Moeller (Otterbein)
- John Loyer (Akron)
- Chuck Machock (Cincinnati)

Legend

- (C) Team captain
- (S) Suspended
- (I) Ineligible
- (W) Walk-on
- Injured
- Current redshirt

== Schedule ==
Date time, TV	Rank^{#}	Opponent^{#}	Result	Record	Site city, state
Regular season
Nov 17, 1993*	No. 19	Butler; Preseason NIT	W 90–72	1–0	Myrl H. Shoemaker Center; Cincinnati, Ohio
Nov 18, 1993*	No. 19	at No. 1 North Carolina; Preseason NIT	L 63–90	1–1	Dean Smith Center; Chapel Hill, North Carolina
Nov 29, 1993*	No. 23	Wyoming	W 73–49	2–1	Myrl H. Shoemaker Center; Cincinnati, Ohio
Dec 1, 1993*	No. 23	Tennessee State	W 79–70	3–1	Myrl H. Shoemaker Center; Cincinnati, Ohio
Dec 3, 1993*	No. 23	Washington	W 88–72	4–1	Myrl H. Shoemaker Center; Cincinnati, Ohio
Dec 10, 1993*	No. 20	Cleveland State	W 92–70	5–1	Myrl H. Shoemaker Center; Cincinnati, Ohio
Dec 11, 1993*	No. 20	Rutgers	W 75–61	6–1	Myrl H. Shoemaker Center; Cincinnati, Ohio
Dec 16, 1993*	No. 17	at No. 4 Temple	L 72–88	6–2	McGonigle Hall; Philadelphia, Pennsylvania
Dec 18, 1993*	No. 17	Youngstown State	W 95–55	7–2	Myrl H. Shoemaker Center; Cincinnati, Ohio
Dec 22, 1993*	No. 20	Miami (OH)	W 78–75	8–2	Myrl H. Shoemaker Center; Cincinnati, Ohio
Dec 28, 1993*	No. 18	Robert Morris	W 84–59	9–2	Myrl H. Shoemaker Center; Cincinnati, Ohio
Dec 31, 1993*	No. 18	at Austin Peay	W 85–75	10–2	Dunn Center; Clarksville, Tennessee
Jan 5, 1994*	No. 17	Chicago State	W 103–49	11–2	Myrl H. Shoemaker Center; Cincinnati, Ohio
Jan 9, 1994	No. 17	UAB	L 65–67	11–3 (0–1)	Myrl H. Shoemaker Center (13,176); Cincinnati, Ohio
Jan 15, 1994	No. 21	at Dayton	W 79–63	12–3 (1–1)	UD Arena; Dayton, Ohio
Jan 19, 1994*	No. 19	at No. 22 Xavier	L 76–82 ^{2OT}	12–4	Cincinnati Gardens; Cincinnati, Ohio
Jan 15, 1994	No. 19	at Memphis State	L 55–62	12–5 (1–2)	Pyramid Arena; Memphis, Tennessee
Jan 27, 1994*		No. 8 UMass	W 76–74	13–5	Myrl H. Shoemaker Center; Cincinnati, Ohio
Jan 29, 1994		DePaul	W 66–43	14–5 (2–2)	Myrl H. Shoemaker Center; Cincinnati, Ohio
Feb 3, 1994	No. 25	Memphis State	W 69–64	15–5 (3–2)	Myrl H. Shoemaker Center; Cincinnati, Ohio
Feb 5, 1994	No. 25	at No. 17 UAB	L 67–83	15–6 (3–3)	UAB Arena (8,907); Birmingham, Alabama
Feb 10, 1994		No. 22 Marquette	L 60–61	15–7 (3–4)	Myrl H. Shoemaker Center; Cincinnati, Ohio
Feb 13, 1994		at No. 22 Marquette	W 89–82 ^{2OT}	16–7 (4–4)	Bradley Center; Milwaukee, Wisconsin
Feb 16, 1994	No. 23	No. 18 Saint Louis	W 78–73	17–7 (5–4)	Myrl H. Shoemaker Center (13,176); Cincinnati, Ohio
Feb 20, 1994*	No. 19	vs. No. 23 California; 7-Up Shootout	L 67–70	17–8	Orlando Arena; Orlando, Florida
Feb 23, 1994		at No. 19 Saint Louis	L 67–70	17–9 (5–5)	St. Louis Arena (18,411); St. Louis, Missouri
Feb 26, 1994		Dayton	W 93–54	18–9 (6–5)	Myrl H. Shoemaker Center; Cincinnati, Ohio
Mar 2, 1994		at DePaul	W 81–65	19–9 (7–5)	Rosemont Horizon; Rosemont, Illinois
Great Midwest Tournament
Mar 10, 1994*	(4)	(5) DePaul; Quarterfinals	W 95–86	20–9	Myrl H. Shoemaker Center; Cincinnati, Ohio
Mar 11, 1994*	(4)	(1) No. 19 Marquette; Semifinals	W 72–63	21–9	Myrl H. Shoemaker Center; Cincinnati, Ohio
Mar 12, 1994*	(4)	(6) Memphis State; Championship game	W 68–47	22–9	Myrl H. Shoemaker Center; Cincinnati, Ohio
NCAA Tournament
Mar 17, 1994*	(8 W)	vs. (9 W) Wisconsin; First round	L 72–80	22–10	Dee Events Center (12,126); Ogden, Utah
*Non-conference game. ^{#}Rankings from AP poll. (#) Tournament seedings in parentheses. W=West.
