= 1994 Atlantic 10 men's basketball tournament =

- Classification: Division I
- Season: 1993–94
- Teams: 9
- Site: The Palestra (First 3 rounds); Philadelphia and Mullins Center (Championship); Amherst, Massachusetts
- Champions: UMass (3rd title)
- Winning coach: John Calipari (3rd title)
- MVP: Mike Williams (UMass)

1993–94 Atlantic 10 men's basketball standings
	Conf.				Overall
Team	W		L	PCT	W		L	PCT
No. 8 UMass †	14	–	2	.875	28	–	7	.800
No. 12 Temple	12	–	4	.750	23	–	8	.742
George Washington	8	–	8	.500	18	–	12	.600
West Virginia	8	–	8	.500	17	–	12	.586
Duquesne	8	–	8	.500	17	–	13	.567
Rhode Island	7	–	9	.438	11	–	16	.407
Rutgers	6	–	10	.375	11	–	16	.407
Saint Joseph's	5	–	11	.313	14	–	14	.500
St. Bonaventure	4	–	12	.250	10	–	17	.370
† 1994 Atlantic 10 Tournament winner Rankings from AP Poll

The 1994 Atlantic 10 men's basketball tournament was played from March 5 to March 7, 1994, and March 11, 1994. The first three rounds were played at the Palestra in Philadelphia, Pennsylvania, while the final was played at the Mullins Center in Amherst, Massachusetts. The winner was named champion of the Atlantic 10 Conference and received an automatic bid to the 1994 NCAA Men's Division I Basketball Tournament. The University of Massachusetts became the first team in Atlantic 10 history to win the tournament for a third year in a row. George Washington and Temple also received bids to the NCAA Tournament. Mike Williams of Massachusetts was named the tournament's Most Outstanding Player. Future NBA players Derrick Alston (Duquesne), Eddie Jones (Temple), Aaron McKie (Temple), and Lou Roe (Massachusetts) joined Williams on the All-Championship Team.

== Bracket ==
First round Saturday, March 5 Palestra, Philadelphia, PA
8	Saint Joseph's	94
9	St. Bonaventure	83

Quarterfinals; Sunday, March 6 Palestra
1	#9 UMass	74
8	Saint Joseph's	58
4	West Virginia	68
5	Duquesne	70
2	#12 Temple	58
7	Rutgers	44
3	George Washington	70
6	Rhode Island	61

Semifinals; Monday, March 7 Palestra
1	#9 UMass	69
5	Duquesne	52
2	#12 Temple	54
3	George Washington	34

Final; Thursday, March 10; Mullins Center, Amherst, MA
1	#9 UMass	70
2	#12 Temple	59
