= 1993–94 Marquette Warriors men's basketball team =

American college basketball season

1993–94 Marquette Warriors men's basketball

Great Midwest Conference Champions

NCAA tournament, Semifinal, L 49–59 vs. Duke
- Conference: Great Midwest Conference

Ranking
- Coaches: No. 17
- AP: No. 21
- Record: 24–9 (10-2 GMWC)
- Head coach: Kevin O'Neill (5th season)
- Home arena: Bradley Center

1993–94 Great Midwest Conference men's basketball standings
	Conf.				Overall
Team	W		L	PCT	W		L	PCT
No. 21 Marquette	10	–	2	.833	24	–	9	.727
No. 24 Saint Louis	8	–	4	.667	23	–	6	.793
UAB	8	–	4	.667	22	–	8	.733
No. 25 Cincinnati †	7	–	5	.583	22	–	10	.688
DePaul	4	–	8	.333	16	–	12	.571
Memphis State	4	–	8	.333	13	–	16	.448
Dayton	1	–	11	.083	6	–	21	.222
† 1994 GMC tournament winner Rankings from AP Poll

The 1993–94 Marquette Warriors men's basketball team represented the Marquette University in the 1993–94 season. The Warriors, coached by Kevin O’Neill, were then a member of Great Midwest Conference.

The Warriors were invited to participate in the 1994 NCAA tournament, where Marquette advanced to the Sweet Sixteen for the first time since 1977.

The 1993-94 season was the last in which Marquette went by the nickname "Warriors." Toward the end of the end of the 1993–94 academic year, the school decided to change the nickname for their sports teams to "Golden Eagles" effective the following school year.

== Roster ==
1993–94 Marquette Warriors men's basketball team
Players
Coaches

Pos.	#	Name	Height	Weight	Year	Hometown
F	40	Faisal Abraham	6 ft 7 in (2.01 m)	225 lb (102 kg)	Fr	St. Croix, Virgin Islands
F	5	Chris Crawford	6 ft 9 in (2.06 m)	215 lb (98 kg)	Fr	Kalamazoo, Michigan
G	13	Roney Eford	6 ft 6 in (1.98 m)	205 lb (93 kg)	So	Queens, New York
F	35	Damon Key	6 ft 8 in (2.03 m)	245 lb (111 kg)	Sr	Milwaukee, Wisconsin
G	12	Robb Logterman	6 ft 3 in (1.91 m)	170 lb (77 kg)	Sr	Janesville, Wisconsin
C	00	Amal McCaskill	6 ft 11 in (2.11 m)	220 lb (100 kg)	RS So	Maywood, Illinois
C	34	Jim McIlvaine	7 ft 1 in (2.16 m)	240 lb (109 kg)	Sr	Racine, Wisconsin
G	10	Tony Miller	6 ft 0 in (1.83 m)	189 lb (86 kg)	Jr	Cleveland, Ohio
G	3	Anthony Pieper	6 ft 3 in (1.91 m)	185 lb (84 kg)	Fr	Wausaukee, Wisconsin

Head coach

- Kevin O'Neill

Assistant coach(es)

Legend

- (C) Team captain
- (S) Suspended
- (I) Ineligible
- (W) Walk-on
- Injured
- Current redshirt

== Schedule ==
Date time, TV	Rank^{#}	Opponent^{#}	Result	Record	Site city, state
November 26*		vs. American-Puerto Rico	W 86–72	1–0	San Juan, PR
November 27*		vs. East Tennessee State	W 87–72	2–0	San Juan, PR
November 28*		vs. Washington State	L 46–56	2–1	San Juan, PR
December 3*		Texas Southern	W 85–67	3–1	Bradley Center; Milwaukee, WI
December 4*; 9:00 p.m.		UW-Green Bay; First Bank Classic	L 45–46	3–2	Bradley Center (13,840); Milwaukee, WI
December 7*		No. 16 Illinois	W 74–65	4–2	Bradley Center (14,195); Milwaukee, WI
December 12*		Ohio State	W 86–66	5–2	Bradley Center; Milwaukee, WI
December 21*		Louisiana Tech	W 84–48	6–2	Bradley Center; Milwaukee, WI
December 28*		at Northern Illinois	W 73–58	7–2	Chick Evans Field House; DeKalb, Illinois
January 2*	No. 24	at No. 17 Wisconsin	L 52–71	7–3	Wisconsin Field House (11,500); Madison, Wisconsin
January 5		Memphis State	W 79–67	8–3 (1–0)	Bradley Center; Milwaukee, WI
January 8*	No. 25	at No. 9 Arizona	L 80–94	8–4 (1–0)	McKale Center; Tucson, Arizona
January 12		at DePaul	W 71–52	9–4 (2–0)	Rosemont Horizon; Rosemont, Illinois
January 19		at No. 18 UAB	W 60–58	10–4 (3–0)	Bartow Arena (8,340); Birmingham, Alabama
January 22		No. 23 Saint Louis	W 62–52	11–4 (4–0)	Bradley Center (16,354); Milwaukee, WI
January 26	No. 22	at No. 23 Saint Louis	L 66–76	11–5 (4–1)	St. Louis Arena (18,158); St. Louis, Missouri
January 29		at Memphis State	W 51–46	12–5 (5–1)	The Pyramid; Memphis, Tennessee
January 31*		South Florida	W 78–54	13–5 (5–1)	Bradley Center; Milwaukee, WI
February 2		No. 17 UAB	W 58–54	14–5 (6–1)	Bradley Center (13,238); Milwaukee, WI
February 5*		West Virginia	W 75–50	15–5 (6–1)	Bradley Center; Milwaukee, WI
February 10	No. 22	at Cincinnati	W 61–60	16–5 (7–1)	Fifth Third Arena; Cincinnati, Ohio
February 13	No. 22	Cincinnati	L 82–89 ^{2OT}	16–6 (7–2)	Bradley Center; Milwaukee, WI
February 15*		at Virginia Tech	W 55–48	17–6 (7–2)	Cassell Coliseum; Blacksburg, Virginia
February 17*		Notre Dame	L 58–68	17–7 (7–2)	Bradley Center; Milwaukee, WI
February 20		Dayton	W 84–62	18–7 (8–2)	Bradley Center; Milwaukee, WI
February 23		at Dayton	W 63–58	19–7 (9–2)	University of Dayton Arena; Dayton, Ohio
February 27		DePaul	W 70–62	20–7 (10–2)	Bradley Center; Milwaukee, WI
February 28*		San Francisco	W 86–65	21–7 (10–2)	Bradley Center; Milwaukee, WI
March 4*		UW Milwaukee	W 73–51	22–7 (10–2)	Bradley Center; Milwaukee, WI
March 11	(1) No. 19	vs. (4) Cincinnati; Great Midwest Conference tournament	L 63–72	22–8 (10–3)	The Pyramid; Memphis, Tennessee
March 18*	(6 SE) No. 21	vs. (11 SE) SW Louisiana; NCAA tournament • First Round	W 81–59	23–8 (10–3)	Tropicana Field; St. Petersburg, Florida
March 20*	(6 SE) No. 21	vs. (3 SE) No. 7 Kentucky; NCAA tournament • Second Round	W 75–63	24–8 (10–3)	Tropicana Field; St. Petersburg, Florida
March 24*	(6 SE) No. 21	vs. (2 SE) No. 6 Duke; NCAA tournament • Sweet Sixteen	L 49–59	24–9 (10–3)	Thompson-Boling Arena; Knoxville, Tennessee
*Non-conference game. ^{#}Rankings from AP poll. (#) Tournament seedings in parentheses. SE=Southeast. All times are in Central Time.

== Team players drafted into the NBA ==
Round	Pick	Player	NBA club
2	32	Jim McIlvaine	Washington Bullets
