= 1993–94 George Washington Colonials men's basketball team =

American college basketball season

1993–94 George Washington Colonials men's basketball

NCAA tournament, Round of 32
- Conference: Atlantic 10 Conference
- Record: 18–12 (8–8 A-10)
- Head coach: Mike Jarvis (4th season)
- Home arena: Charles E. Smith Athletic Center

1993–94 Atlantic 10 men's basketball standings
	Conf.				Overall
Team	W		L	PCT	W		L	PCT
No. 8 UMass †	14	–	2	.875	28	–	7	.800
No. 12 Temple	12	–	4	.750	23	–	8	.742
George Washington	8	–	8	.500	18	–	12	.600
West Virginia	8	–	8	.500	17	–	12	.586
Duquesne	8	–	8	.500	17	–	13	.567
Rhode Island	7	–	9	.438	11	–	16	.407
Rutgers	6	–	10	.375	11	–	16	.407
Saint Joseph's	5	–	11	.313	14	–	14	.500
St. Bonaventure	4	–	12	.250	10	–	17	.370
† 1994 Atlantic 10 Tournament winner Rankings from AP Poll

The 1993–94 George Washington Colonials men's basketball team represent George Washington University as a member of the Atlantic 10 Conference during the 1993–94 NCAA Division I men's basketball season. The team was coached by Mike Jarvis and played their home games at the Charles E. Smith Athletic Center. The Colonials finished in a three-way tie for third place in the regular season conference standings. After being knocked out in the semifinal round of the A-10 tournament, GW received an at-large bid to the 1994 NCAA tournament as No. 10 seed in the East region. The Colonials defeated No. 7 seed UAB before falling to No. 2 seed UConn, 75–63, to finish with a record of 18–12 (8–8 A-10).

== Roster ==
1993–94 George Washington Colonials men's basketball team
Players	Coaches
Pos. / # / Name / Height / Weight / Year / Hometown; C / 33 / Yinka Dare / 7 ft 1.5 in (2.17 m) / 260 lb (118 kg) / So / Kano, Nigeria	Head coach: Mike Jarvis (Northeastern); Assistant coach(es) Legend: (C) Team captain; (S) Suspended; (I) Ineligible; (W) Walk-on; Injured; Current redshirt; Roster

== Schedule and results ==
Date time, TV	Rank^{#}	Opponent^{#}	Result	Record	Site city, state
Regular season
Nov 29, 1993*	No. 23	at American	W 85–50	1–0	Bender Arena; Washington, D.C.
Dec 3, 1993*	No. 23	vs. No. 4 North Carolina	L 62–87	1–1	Bojangles' Coliseum; Charlotte, North Carolina
Dec 4, 1993*	No. 23	vs. South Carolina	W 77–71	2–1	Bojangles' Coliseum; Charlotte, North Carolina
Dec 10, 1993*	No. 24	Long Island University	W 76–60	3–1	Charles E. Smith Center; Washington, D.C.
Dec 11, 1993*	No. 24	Jackson State	W 94–74	4–1	Charles E. Smith Center; Washington, D.C.
Dec 18, 1993*	No. 23	Pepperdine	W 66–59	5–1	Charles E. Smith Center; Washington, D.C.
Dec 27, 1993*	No. 23	vs. Coastal Carolina	W 87–68	6–1	Lakefront Arena; New Orleans, Louisiana
Dec 28, 1993*	No. 21	at New Orleans	L 60–63	6–2	Lakefront Arena; New Orleans, Louisiana
Jan 3, 1994	No. 23	at St. Bonaventure	L 67–71	6–3 (0–1)	Reilly Center; St. Bonaventure, New York
Jan 6, 1994	No. 23	Rutgers	W 89–69	7–3 (1–1)	Charles E. Smith Center; Washington, D.C.
Jan 8, 1994	No. 23	at No. 7 Temple	L 64–80	7–4 (1–2)	McGonigle Hall; Philadelphia, Pennsylvania
Jan 12, 1994		Duquesne	W 87–72	8–4 (2–2)	Charles E. Smith Center; Washington, D.C.
Atlantic 10 Tournament
Mar 6, 1994*		vs. Rhode Island; Quarterfinals	W 70–61	17–10	Palestra; Philadelphia, Pennsylvania
Mar 7, 1994*		at No. 12 Temple; Semifinals	L 34–54	17–11	Palestra; Philadelphia, Pennsylvania
NCAA Tournament
Mar 17, 1994*	(10 E)	vs. (7 E) UAB; First Round	W 51–46	18–11	Nassau Coliseum; Uniondale, New York
Mar 19, 1994*	(10 E)	vs. (2 E) No. 4 Connecticut; Second Round	L 63–75	18–12	Nassau Coliseum (16,204); Uniondale, New York
*Non-conference game. ^{#}Rankings from AP poll. (#) Tournament seedings in parentheses. E=East.
