= 1994 Big South Conference men's basketball tournament =

- Classification: Division I
- Season: 1993–94
- Teams: 8
- Site: North Charleston Coliseum; North Charleston, SC
- Champions: Liberty (1st title)
- Winning coach: Jeff Meyer (1st title)
- MVP: Peter Aluma (Liberty)

1993–94 Big South Conference men's basketball standings
	Conf.				Overall
Team	W		L	PCT	W		L	PCT
Towson State	15	–	3	.833	21	–	9	.700
Radford	13	–	5	.722	20	–	8	.714
Campbell	13	–	5	.722	20	–	9	.690
Liberty †	12	–	6	.667	18	–	12	.600
UNC Greensboro	11	–	7	.611	15	–	12	.556
Coastal Carolina	10	–	8	.556	15	–	11	.577
Charleston Southern	7	–	11	.389	9	–	18	.333
UMBC	5	–	13	.278	6	–	21	.222
Winthrop	3	–	15	.167	4	–	23	.148
UNC Asheville	3	–	15	.167	3	–	24	.111
† 1994 Big South tournament winner Rankings from AP Poll

The 1994 Big South Conference men's basketball tournament took place March 4–7, 1994, at the North Charleston Coliseum in North Charleston, South Carolina. For the first time in their school history, the Liberty Flames won the tournament, led by head coach Jeff Meyer.

== Format ==
All of the conference's nine teams were originally set to participate in the tournament, hosted at the North Charleston Coliseum. However, due to recruiting violations committed by Coastal Carolina the previous season, the Chanticleers were declared ineligible and all other members were allowed to participate. Teams were seeded by conference winning percentage. This was the last year for Campbell as a member of the conference, although they returned to the league in 2011–12.

== Bracket ==
Quarterfinals; March 4
1	Towson State	64
8	UNC Asheville	56
4	Liberty	82
5	Charleston Southern	71
3	Radford	81
6	UMBC	78
2	Campbell	79
7	Winthrop	71

Semifinals; March 5
1	Towson State	58
4	Liberty	63
3	Radford	61
2	Campbell	72

Finals; March 7
4	Liberty	76
2	Campbell	62

- Source

== All-Tournament Team ==
- Peter Aluma, Liberty
- Darryl Williams, Liberty
- Scott Neely, Campbell
- Joe Spinks, Campbell
- Tyrone Travis, Radford
