= 1993–94 Maryland Terrapins men's basketball team =

American college basketball season

1993–94 Maryland Terrapins men's basketball

NCAA tournament, Sweet Sixteen
- Conference: Atlantic Coast Conference

Ranking
- Coaches: No. 20
- Record: 18–12 (8–8 ACC)
- Head coach: Gary Williams (5th season)
- Home arena: Cole Field House

1993–94 ACC men's basketball standings
	Conf.				Overall
Team	W		L	PCT	W		L	PCT
No. 6 Duke	12	–	4	.750	28	–	6	.824
No. 1 North Carolina †	11	–	5	.688	28	–	7	.800
Wake Forest	9	–	7	.563	21	–	12	.636
Virginia	8	–	8	.500	18	–	13	.581
Maryland	8	–	8	.500	18	–	12	.600
Georgia Tech	7	–	9	.438	16	–	13	.552
Florida State	6	–	10	.375	13	–	14	.481
Clemson	6	–	10	.375	18	–	16	.529
NC State	5	–	11	.313	11	–	19	.367
† 1994 ACC tournament winner Rankings from AP poll

The 1993–94 Maryland Terrapins Men's Basketball Team represented the University of Maryland as a member of the Atlantic Coast Conference during the 1993–94 season. Led by head coach Gary Williams, the Terrapins made their first NCAA Tournament and Sweet Sixteen under Williams. The team finished with a record of 18–12 (8–8 ACC).

== Roster ==
1993–94 Maryland Terrapins men's basketball team
Players
Coaches

Pos.	#	Name	Height	Weight	Year	Hometown
G	3	Matt Raydo	5 ft 10 in (1.78 m)	160 lb (73 kg)	Fr	Fort Lauderdale, Florida
F	4	Exree Hipp	6 ft 8 in (2.03 m)	183 lb (83 kg)	So	Washington, D.C.
G	10	Duane Simpkins	6 ft 0 in (1.83 m)	173 lb (78 kg)	So	Fort Washington, Maryland
G	11	Matt Kovarik	6 ft 5 in (1.96 m)	179 lb (81 kg)	Fr	Greensboro, North Carolina
G	15	Johnny Rhodes	6 ft 5 in (1.96 m)	205 lb (93 kg)	So	Washington, D.C.
F	21	Mario Lucas	6 ft 8 in (2.03 m)	230 lb (104 kg)	So	Memphis, Tennessee
SF	22	Keith Booth	6 ft 6 in (1.98 m)	220 lb (100 kg)	Fr	Baltimore, Maryland
F	24	John Walsh	6 ft 8 in (2.03 m)	221 lb (100 kg)	Jr	West Islip, New York
G/F	30	Nick Bosnic	6 ft 7 in (2.01 m)	197 lb (89 kg)	Fr	Uniontown, Pennsylvania
G	31	Wayne Bristol	6 ft 1 in (1.85 m)	178 lb (81 kg)	Jr	Beltsville, Maryland
F/C	32	Joe Smith	6 ft 9 in (2.06 m)	220 lb (100 kg)	Fr	Norfolk, Virginia
F	55	Kurtis Shultz	6 ft 6 in (1.98 m)	235 lb (107 kg)	Jr	Randallstown, Maryland

Head coach

- Gary Williams (Maryland)

Assistant coach(es)

Legend

- (C) Team captain
- (S) Suspended
- (I) Ineligible
- (W) Walk-on
- Injured
- Current redshirt

Roster

== Schedule and results ==
Date time, TV	Rank^{#}	Opponent^{#}	Result	Record	Site city, state
Regular season
Nov 26, 1993*		vs. No. 15 Georgetown	W 84–83 ^{OT}	1–0	USAir Arena (13,761); Landover, Maryland
Nov 27, 1993*		Cornell	W 92–41	2–0	Cole Fieldhouse; College Park, Maryland
Nov 30, 1993*		Rider	W 93–79	3–0	Cole Fieldhouse; College Park, Maryland
Dec 2, 1993*		UMBC	W 89–80	4–0	Cole Fieldhouse; College Park, Maryland
Dec 4, 1993*		Morgan State	W 85–62	5–0	Cole Fieldhouse; College Park, Maryland
Dec 7, 1993*		vs. Oklahoma	L 85–88	5–1	Myriad Convention Center; Oklahoma City, Oklahoma
Dec 23, 1993*		vs. Towson State	W 109–71	6–1	Baltimore Arena; Baltimore, Maryland
Dec 28, 1993*		vs. Hofstra; Abdow's Hall of Fame Holiday Classic	W 93–67	7–1	Springfield Civic Center; Springfield, Massachusetts
Dec 29, 1993*		vs. No. 9 UMass; Abdow's Hall of Fame Holiday Classic	L 80–94	7–2	Springfield Civic Center; Springfield, Massachusetts
Jan 4, 1994		at No. 12 Georgia Tech	W 91–88	8–2 (1–0)	Alexander Memorial Coliseum; Atlanta, Georgia
Jan 8, 1994		No. 2 North Carolina	L 70–75	8–3 (1–1)	Cole Fieldhouse; College Park, Maryland
Jan 11, 1994		Florida State	W 80–74	9–3 (2–1)	Cole Fieldhouse; College Park, Maryland
Jan 15, 1994		at Wake Forest	W 61–58	10–3 (3–1)	Lawrence Joel Coliseum; Winston-Salem, North Carolina
Jan 22, 1994	No. 25	NC State	W 102–70	11–3 (4–1)	Cole Fieldhouse; College Park, Maryland
Jan 26, 1994	No. 18	Clemson	W 73–53	12–3 (5–1)	Cole Fieldhouse; College Park, Maryland
Jan 29, 1994	No. 18	at No. 2 Duke	L 62–75	12–4 (5–2)	Cameron Indoor Stadium; Durham, North Carolina
Feb 2, 1994	No. 21	at Virginia	L 66–73	12–5 (5–3)	University Hall; Charlottesville, Virginia
Feb 5, 1994		Georgia Tech	L 71–83	12–6 (5–4)	Cole Fieldhouse; College Park, Maryland
Feb 10, 1994		at No. 1 North Carolina	L 89–95	12–7 (5–5)	Dean Smith Center; Chapel Hill, North Carolina
Feb 12, 1994		at Florida State	W 69–66	13–7 (6–5)	Donald L. Tucker Center; Tallahassee, Florida
Feb 16, 1994		Wake Forest	W 81–58	14–7 (7–5)	Cole Fieldhouse; College Park, Maryland
Feb 19, 1994*		Loyola (MD)	W 94–71	15–7	Cole Fieldhouse; College Park, Maryland
Feb 23, 1994		at NC State	L 71–79	15–8 (7–6)	Reynolds Coliseum; Raleigh, North Carolina
Feb 26, 1994		at Clemson	L 67–73	15–9 (7–7)	Littlejohn Coliseum; Clemson, South Carolina
Mar 2, 1994		No. 2 Duke	L 69–73	15–10 (7–8)	Cole Fieldhouse; College Park, Maryland
Mar 5, 1994*		Virginia	W 70–68	16–10 (8–8)	Cole Fieldhouse; College Park, Maryland
ACC Tournament
Mar 11, 1994*		vs. Virginia; ACC Tournament Quarterfinals	L 63–69	16–11	Charlotte Coliseum; Charlotte, North Carolina
NCAA Tournament
Mar 17, 1994*	(10 MW)	vs. (7 MW) No. 24 Saint Louis; First round	W 74–66	17–11	Kansas Coliseum; Wichita, Kansas
Mar 19, 1994*	(10 MW)	vs. (2 MW) No. 8 UMass; Second Round	W 95–87	18–11	Kansas Coliseum; Wichita, Kansas
Mar 25, 1994*	(10 MW)	vs. (3 MW) No. 11 Michigan; Midwest Regional semifinal – Sweet Sixteen	L 71–78	18–12	Reunion Arena; Dallas, Texas
*Non-conference game. ^{#}Rankings from AP Poll. (#) Tournament seedings in parentheses. MW=Midwest.
