= 1993–94 North Carolina Tar Heels men's basketball team =

American college basketball season

1993–94 North Carolina Tar Heels men's basketball

AP Poll regular season champions ACC tournament champions

NCAA tournament, Round of 32
- Conference: Atlantic Coast Conference

Ranking
- Coaches: No. 9
- AP: No. 1
- Record: 28–7 (11–5 ACC)
- Head coach: Dean Smith (33rd season)
- Assistant coach: Bill Guthridge (27th season)
- Home arena: Dean Smith Center

1993–94 ACC men's basketball standings
	Conf.				Overall
Team	W		L	PCT	W		L	PCT
No. 6 Duke	12	–	4	.750	28	–	6	.824
No. 1 North Carolina †	11	–	5	.688	28	–	7	.800
Wake Forest	9	–	7	.563	21	–	12	.636
Virginia	8	–	8	.500	18	–	13	.581
Maryland	8	–	8	.500	18	–	12	.600
Georgia Tech	7	–	9	.438	16	–	13	.552
Florida State	6	–	10	.375	13	–	14	.481
Clemson	6	–	10	.375	18	–	16	.529
NC State	5	–	11	.313	11	–	19	.367
† 1994 ACC tournament winner Rankings from AP poll

The 1993–94 North Carolina Tar Heels men's basketball team represented the University of North Carolina at Chapel Hill.

Led by head coach Dean Smith, the Tar Heels reached the second round of the NCAA tournament. Marking the first time since 1980 that the Tar Heels failed to reach the Sweet Sixteen.

== Roster ==
1993–94 North Carolina Tar Heels men's basketball team
Players
Coaches

Pos.	#	Name	Height	Weight	Year	Hometown
C	00	Eric Montross	7 ft 0 in (2.13 m)	270 lb (122 kg)	Sr	Indianapolis, IN
F	3	Pat Sullivan (redshirt)	6 ft 8 in (2.03 m)	210 lb (95 kg)	Sr	Bogota, NJ
G	4	Larry Davis	6 ft 1 in (1.85 m)	184 lb (83 kg)	So	Denmark, SC
G	5	Jeff McInnis	6 ft 3 in (1.91 m)	190 lb (86 kg)	Fr	Charlotte, NC
G	14	Derrick Phelps	6 ft 4 in (1.93 m)	180 lb (82 kg)	Sr	Pleasantville, NY
G	21	Donald Williams	6 ft 3 in (1.91 m)	194 lb (88 kg)	Jr	Garner, NC
G	22	Pearce Landry	6 ft 5 in (1.96 m)	180 lb (82 kg)	Jr	Greensboro, NC
G	24	Dante Calabria	6 ft 4 in (1.93 m)	185 lb (84 kg)	So	Beaver Falls, PA
F	30	Rasheed Wallace	6 ft 10 in (2.08 m)	225 lb (102 kg)	Fr	Philadelphia, PA
F	31	Brian Reese	6 ft 6 in (1.98 m)	215 lb (98 kg)	Sr	The Bronx, NY
C	33	Kevin Salvadori	7 ft 0 in (2.13 m)	224 lb (102 kg)	Sr	Pittsburgh, PA
F	42	Jerry Stackhouse	6 ft 6 in (1.98 m)	215 lb (98 kg)	Fr	Kinston, NC
C	45	Serge Zwikker	7 ft 2 in (2.18 m)	273 lb (124 kg)	Fr	Potomac, MD

Head coach

- Dean Smith (Kansas)

Assistant coach(es)

- Bill Guthridge (Kansas State)

Legend

- (C) Team captain
- (S) Suspended
- (I) Ineligible
- (W) Walk-on
- Injured
- Current redshirt

Roster
Last update: March 24, 2020

== Schedule and results ==
Date time, TV	Rank^{#}	Opponent^{#}	Result	Record	Site city, state
Regular Season
Nov 17, 1993*	No. 1	Western Kentucky; Preseason NIT	W 101–87	1–0	Dean Smith Center; Chapel Hill, NC
Nov 18, 1993*	No. 1	No. 19 Cincinnati; Preseason NIT	W 90–63	2–0	Dean Smith Center; Chapel Hill, NC
Nov 24, 1993*	No. 1	vs. No. 18 Massachusetts; Preseason NIT	L 86–91 ^{OT}	2–1	Madison Square Garden; New York, New York
Nov 26, 1993*	No. 1	vs. No. 9 Minnesota; Preseason NIT	W 90–76	3–1	Madison Square Garden; New York, New York
Dec 1, 1993*	No. 4	Hawaii	W 92–77	4–1	Dean Smith Center; Chapel Hill, North Carolina
Dec 3, 1993*	No. 4	vs. No. 22 George Washington; Tournament of Champions	W 87–62	5–1	Bojangles Coliseum; Charlotte, North Carolina
Dec 4, 1993*	No. 4	vs. BYU; Tournament of Champions	W 97–65	6–1	Bojangles Coliseum; Charlotte, North Carolina
Dec 9, 1993*	No. 2	Colorado State	W 89–66	7–1	Dean Smith Center; Chapel Hill, North Carolina
Dec 18, 1993*	No. 2	Ohio State	W 81–68	8–1	Dean Smith Center; Chapel Hill, North Carolina
Dec 20, 1993*	No. 2	at Pittsburgh	W 106–93	9–1	Fitzgerald Field House; Pittsburgh, Pennsylvania
Jan 2, 1994*	No. 2	Marshall	W 116–62	10–1	Dean Smith Center; Chapel Hill, North Carolina
Jan 5, 1994	No. 2	NC State; Rivalry	W 88–58	11–1 (1–0)	Dean Smith Center; Chapel Hill, North Carolina
Jan 8, 1994	No. 2	at Maryland	W 75–70	12–1 (2–0)	Cole Fieldhouse; College Park, Maryland
Jan 12, 1994	No. 1	at No. 17 Georgia Tech	L 69–89	12–2 (2–1)	Alexander Memorial Coliseum; Atlanta, Georgia
Jan 15, 1994	No. 1	Clemson	W 106–62	13–2 (3–1)	Dean Smith Center; Chapel Hill, North Carolina
Jan 19, 1994	No. 4	at Virginia	L 77–81	13–3 (3–2)	University Hall; Charlottesville, Virginia
Jan 22, 1994*	No. 4	vs. LSU	W 88–65	14–3	Louisiana Superdome; New Orleans, Louisiana
Jan 24, 1994*	No. 4	Butler	W 104–64	15–3	Dean Smith Center; Chapel Hill, North Carolina
Jan 26, 1994	No. 4	at Florida State	W 90–77	16–3 (4–2)	Donald L. Tucker Center; Tallahassee, Florida
Jan 30, 1994	No. 4	Wake Forest; Rivalry	W 85–61	17–3 (5–2)	Dean Smith Center; Chapel Hill, North Carolina
Feb 3, 1994	No. 2	No. 1 Duke; Rivalry	W 89–78	18–3 (6–2)	Dean Smith Center; Chapel Hill, North Carolina
Feb 5, 1994	No. 2	at NC State; Rivalry	W 77–64	19–3 (7–2)	Reynolds Coliseum; Raleigh, North Carolina
Feb 10, 1994	No. 1	Maryland	W 95–89	20–3 (8–2)	Dean Smith Center; Chapel Hill, North Carolina
Feb 12, 1994	No. 1	Georgia Tech	L 89–96	20–4 (8–3)	Dean Smith Center; Chapel Hill, North Carolina
Feb 17, 1994	No. 2	at Clemson	L 69–77	20–5 (8–4)	Littlejohn Coliseum; Clemson, South Carolina
Feb 19, 1994	No. 2	Virginia	W 69–56	21–5 (9–4)	Dean Smith Center; Chapel Hill, North Carolina
Feb 23, 1994*	No. 4	at Notre Dame	W 80–71	22–5	Joyce Center; Notre Dame, Indiana
Feb 26, 1994	No. 4	Florida State	W 78–75	23–5 (9–5)	Dean Smith Center; Chapel Hill, North Carolina
Mar 2, 1994	No. 5	at Wake Forest; Rivalry	L 61–68 ^{OT}	23–6 (10–5)	Lawrence Joel Veterans Memorial Coliseum; Winston-Salem, North Carolina
Mar 5, 1994	No. 5	at No. 2 Duke; Rivalry	W 87–77	24–6 (11–5)	Cameron Indoor Stadium; Durham, NC
ACC Tournament
Mar 11, 1994*	(2) No. 4	vs. (7) Florida State; Quarterfinals	W 83–69	25–6	Bojangles Coliseum; Charlotte, NC
Mar 12, 1994*	(2) No. 4	vs. (3) Wake Forest; Semifinals	W 86–84 ^{OT}	26–6	Bojangles Coliseum; Charlotte, NC
Mar 13, 1994*	(2) No. 4	vs. (4) Virginia; Championship	W 73–66	27–6	Bojangles Coliseum; Charlotte, NC
NCAA Tournament
Mar 18, 1994*	(1 E) No. 1	vs. (16 E) Liberty; First round	W 71–51	28–6	USAir Arena; Landover, MD
Mar 20, 1994*	(1 E) No. 1	vs. (9 E) Boston College; Second round	L 72–75	28–7	USAir Arena; Landover, MD
*Non-conference game. ^{#}Rankings from AP. (#) Tournament seedings in parentheses. E=East. All times are in EST.
