= San Pasqual High School (Escondido, California) =

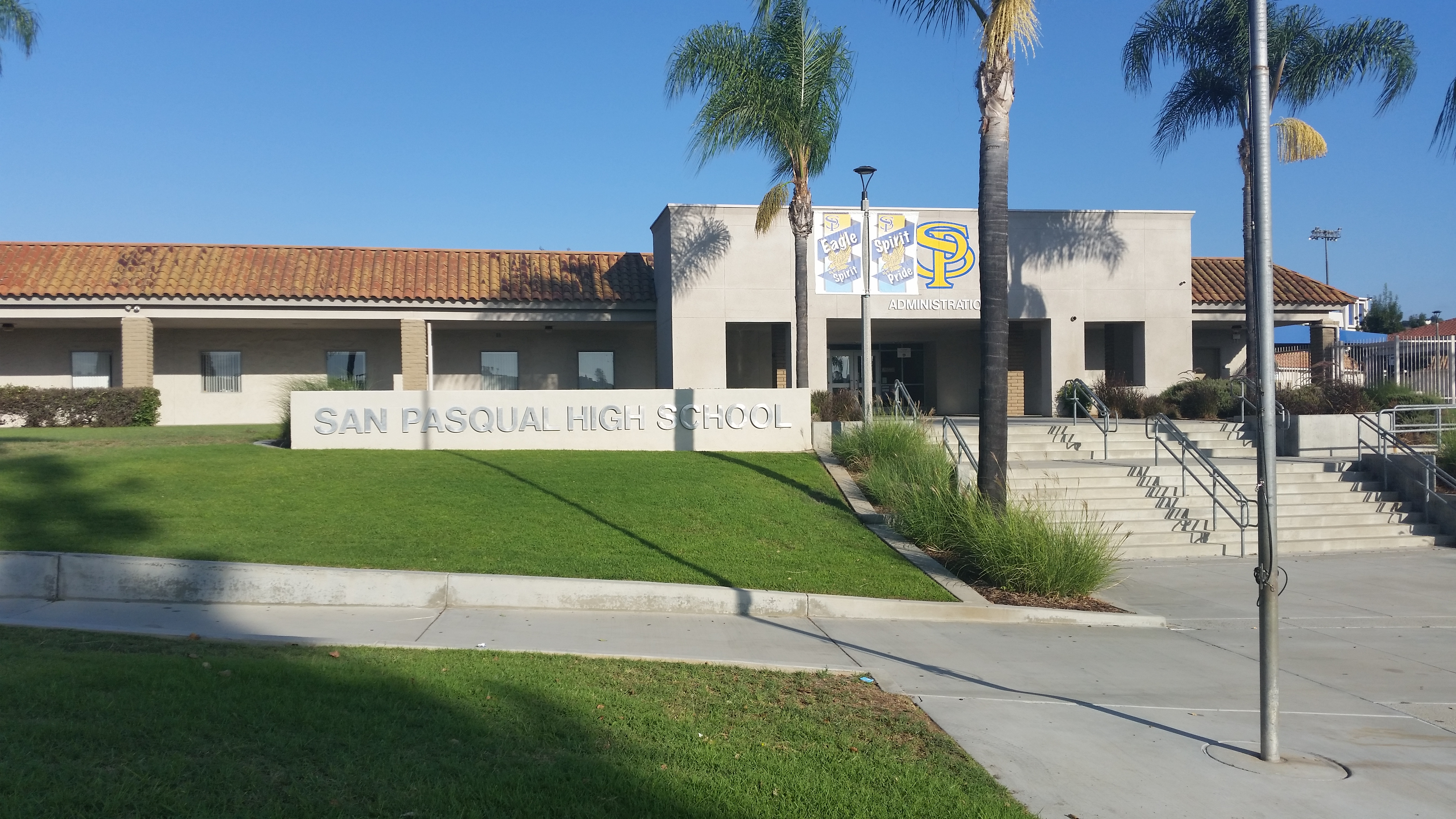
- Administration office and entrance

Location
- 3300 Bear Valley Parkway; Escondido, California 92025; United States
- Coordinates: 33°4′35″N 117°3′23.5″W

Information
- Type: Public
- Established: 1972
- School district: Escondido Union High School District
- Principal: Cory Gregory
- Staff: 90.73 (FTE)
- Grades: 9-12
- Enrollment: 1,853 (2023–2024)
- Student to teacher ratio: 20.42
- Colors: Blue and Gold
- Slogan: United... We are San Pasqual
- Athletics: 15 sports
- Mascot: Golden Eagle
- Website: http://sphsgoldeneagles.org/

San Pasqual High School is a public high school in Escondido, California. It is named after the nearby San Pasqual Valley. It is within the Escondido Union High School District.

== Athletics ==
=== Teams ===
The school supports numerous sports teams that are accredited by the CIF (SDS Division) such as:

- Football
- Basketball
- Baseball
- Wrestling
- Tennis
- Volleyball
- Soccer
- Cross Country
- Field Hockey
- Golf
- Swimming
- Diving
- Water Polo
- Track & Field

In 2010, the Eagles Boys' Varsity Soccer team had become California Interscholastic Federation Division 1 champions.

In 2012, the Eagles Boys' Varsity Soccer team had established a winning season in which they were nationally recognized as the 3rd ranked high school team in the United States and 1st ranked in California according to MaxPreps.com with a record of 20-2-1.

In 2018, the Eagles Girl's Varsity Wrestling Team became the San Diego Section CIF Champions, with 7 Section & 1 State Placers coached by Danny Harris.

In 2019, the Eagles Boys' Varsity basketball team had become CIF Division 5 champions, led by alum and coach Erik Meek.

In 2022, the Eagles Boys’ Varsity soccer team won the San Diego CIF Open Division championship and the Eagles Girls’ Varsity soccer team won the San Diego CIF Division 3 championship.

In 2023, the Eagles Boys’ Varsity soccer won the Division 2 STATE championship.

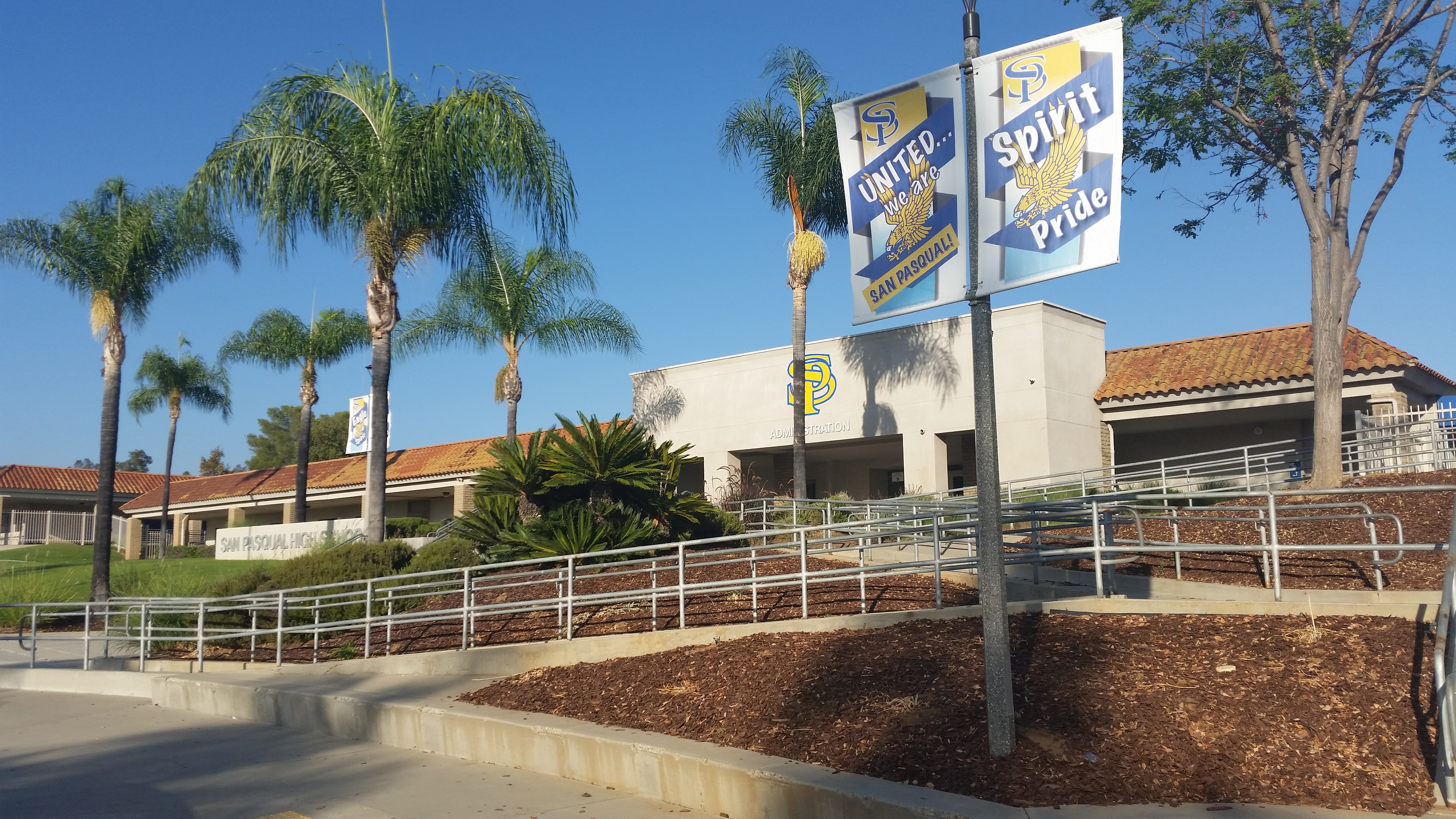
San Pasqual High School

== Notable alumni ==
=== Athletics ===
- Jovan Kirovski — Former soccer player, currently an assistant coach for Los Angeles Galaxy in Major League Soccer
- Erik Meek — Class of '91, Former National Basketball Association player
- Shannon MacMillan — Class of '93, Former professional soccer Player and Oregon Sports Hall of Fame inductee
- Nikki Serlenga — Former professional soccer Player
- Kelli Gannon - University of Michigan Field Hockey Hall of Fame

=== Arts and Media ===
- Andrea Zittel — Class of '83, sculptor and installation artist

=== Business ===
- Tom Anderson — Class of '88, creator of the social networking website Myspace

== Statistics and demographics ==
As of the 2011–2012 school year, the enrollment was approximately 2500 students.

As of 2011, European American students represent 43% of the population, Hispanic and Latino American students represent 47%, Asian American students represent 6%, African American students represent 3%, and American Indian students represent 1%.
