= 1993–94 Temple Owls men's basketball team =

American college basketball season

1993–94 Temple Owls men's basketball

NCAA tournament, second round
- Conference: Atlantic 10 Conference

Ranking
- Coaches: No. 18
- AP: No. 12
- Record: 23–8 (12–4 A–10)
- Head coach: John Chaney (12th season)
- Home arena: McGonigle Hall (Capacity: 4,500)

1993–94 Atlantic 10 men's basketball standings
| | Conf. | | | | Overall |
| Team | W | | L | PCT | W | | L | PCT |
|---|---|---|---|---|---|---|---|---|
| No. 8 UMass † | 14 | – | 2 | .875 | 28 | – | 7 | .800 |
| No. 12 Temple | 12 | – | 4 | .750 | 23 | – | 8 | .742 |
| George Washington | 8 | – | 8 | .500 | 18 | – | 12 | .600 |
| West Virginia | 8 | – | 8 | .500 | 17 | – | 12 | .586 |
| Duquesne | 8 | – | 8 | .500 | 17 | – | 13 | .567 |
| Rhode Island | 7 | – | 9 | .438 | 11 | – | 16 | .407 |
| Rutgers | 6 | – | 10 | .375 | 11 | – | 16 | .407 |
| Saint Joseph's | 5 | – | 11 | .313 | 14 | – | 14 | .500 |
| St. Bonaventure | 4 | – | 12 | .250 | 10 | – | 17 | .370 |
† 1994 Atlantic 10 Tournament winner Rankings from AP Poll

The 1993–94 Temple Owls men's basketball team represented Temple University as a member of the Atlantic 10 Conference during the 1993–94 NCAA Division I men's basketball season. The team was led by head coach, John Chaney and played their home games at McGonigle Hall. The Owls received an at-large bid to the NCAA tournament as No. 4 seed in the East region. Temple defeated No. 13 seed Drexel in the opening round before falling to No. 5 seed Indiana, 67–58. The team finished with a record of 23–8 (12–4 A-10).

== Roster ==
1993–94 Temple Owls men's basketball team
Players
Coaches

| Pos. | # | Name | Height | Weight | Year | Previous school | Hometown |
|---|---|---|---|---|---|---|---|
| PG | 4 | Rick Brunson | 6 ft 4 in (1.93 m) | 180 lb (82 kg) | Jr | Salem HS | Salem, MA |
| G/F | 21 | Eddie Jones | 6 ft 6 in (1.98 m) | 190 lb (86 kg) | Jr | Blanche Ely HS | Pompano Beach, FL |
| G/F | 23 | Aaron McKie | 6 ft 5 in (1.96 m) | 200 lb (91 kg) | Sr | Simon Gratz HS | Philadelphia, PA |
| C | 33 | William Cunningham | 6 ft 11 in (2.11 m) | 240 lb (109 kg) | So | McNair HS | Augusta, GA |

Head coach

- John Chaney

Assistant coach(es)

Legend

- (C) Team captain
- (S) Suspended
- (I) Ineligible
- (W) Walk-on
- Injured
- Current redshirt

Roster

== Schedule and results ==
| Date time, TV | Rank^{#} | Opponent^{#} | Result | Record | Site city, state |
Regular Season
| Dec 1, 1993* | No. 7 | at No. 3 Kansas | W 73–59 | 1–0 | Allen Fieldhouse; Lawrence, Kansas |
| Dec 4, 1993* | No. 7 | UAB | W 55–52 | 2–0 | McGonigle Hall; Philadelphia, Pennsylvania |
| Dec 11, 1993* | No. 5 | vs. Villanova | W 54–49 | 3–0 | The Spectrum; Philadelphia, Pennsylvania |
| Dec 16, 1993* | No. 4 | No. 17 Cincinnati | W 88–72 | 4–0 | McGonigle Hall; Philadelphia, Pennsylvania |
| Dec 27, 1993* | No. 4 | vs. No. 15 Georgia Tech | L 51–57 | 4–1 | Madison Square Garden; New York, New York |
| Dec 28, 1993* | No. 4 | vs. Fairleigh Dickinson | W 63–51 | 5–1 | Madison Square Garden; New York, New York |
| Jan 2, 1994 | No. 4 | Saint Joseph's | W 67–54 | 6–1 (1–0) | McGonigle Hall; Philadelphia, Pennsylvania |
| Jan 6, 1994 | No. 7 | West Virginia | L 47–49 | 6–2 (1–1) | McGonigle Hall; Philadelphia, Pennsylvania |
| Jan 8, 1994 | No. 7 | No. 23 George Washington | W 80–64 | 7–2 (2–1) | McGonigle Hall; Philadelphia, Pennsylvania |
| Jan 11, 1994* | No. 13 | Penn | W 76–65 | 8–2 | McGonigle Hall; Philadelphia, Pennsylvania |
| Jan 15, 1994 | No. 13 | at Rhode Island | W 69–49 | 9–2 (3–1) | Keaney Gymnasium; Kingston, Rhode Island |
| Jan 20, 1994* | No. 11 | at La Salle | W 68–55 | 10–2 | Convention Hall; Philadelphia, Pennsylvania |
| Jan 23, 1994 | No. 11 | at Rutgers | W 78–56 | 11–2 (4–1) | Louis Brown Athletic Center; Piscataway, New Jersey |
Atlantic 10 Tournament
NCAA Tournament
| Mar 18, 1994* | (4 E) No. 12 | vs. (13 E) Drexel; First Round | W 61–39 | 23–7 | USAir Arena (18,667); Landover, Maryland |
| Mar 20, 1994* | (4 E) No. 12 | vs. (5 E) No. 18 Indiana; Second Round | L 58–67 | 23–8 | USAir Arena; Landover, Maryland |
*Non-conference game. ^{#}Rankings from AP Poll. (#) Tournament seedings in parentheses. E=East. All times are in Eastern Standard Time.
