= Ricky Peral =

Spanish basketball player

Personal information
- Born: February 13, 1974 (age 52) Valladolid, Spain
- Listed height: 6 ft 9.9 in (2.08 m)

Career information
- College: Wake Forest (1994–1997)
- Playing career: 1991–2000
- Position: Power forward / small forward
- Number: 44, 10

Career history
- 1991–1992: Real Madrid Baloncesto
- 1992–1993: CB Guadalajara
- 1997–2000: P.A.O.K. BC

Career highlights
- Greek Cup winner (1999)
Medals
Representing Spain
Men's basketball
FIBA Europe Under-16 Championship
Bronze medal – third place	1991 Greece	National Team
FIBA Europe Under-20 Championship
Bronze medal – third place	1994 Slovenia	National Team
Silver medal – second place	1996 Turkey	National Team

Ricardo Peral Antunez (born February 13, 1974), known as Ricky Peral, is a retired Spanish professional basketball player.

== Early career ==
Peral started his career from Real Madrid Baloncesto youth teams. In 1991 he was promoted at the first team. He played in seven games, and he scored eight points.

== College career ==
In 1994 Peral starting played for Wake Forest Demon Deacons men's basketball. His teammate for three years was Tim Duncan. Peral averaged 6.7 points per game at his first season. His sophomore season was his best with 9.4 points per game. Peral finished his college career in 1996–97 with a 7.6 points per game average.

== Greece ==
In 1997, Peral signed a three year with P.A.O.K. BC. IHis best season was 1999–2000, when he had 5.9 points and 2.4 rebounds per game. In domestic competitions, he won the Greek Basketball Cup in 1999, and he played in two finals for the Greek Basketball League

== National team ==
He was member of Spain national under-16 basketball team, Spain national under-18 basketball team and Spain national under-20 basketball team, and he won three medals.
