= Peter Aluma =

Nigerian basketball player (1973–2020)

Personal information
- Born: 26 April 1973 Lagos, Nigeria
- Died: 2 February 2020 (aged 46) Sacramento, California, U.S.
- Listed height: 6 ft 10 in (2.08 m)
- Listed weight: 260 lb (118 kg)

Career information
- High school: Okoto Grammar School (Isolo, Nigeria)
- College: Liberty (1993–1997)
- NBA draft: 1997: undrafted
- Position: Center
- Number: 43

Career history
- 1999: Sacramento Kings

Career highlights
- 2× First-team All-Big South (1996, 1997); Second-team All-Big South (1995); Big South All-Freshman team (1994); 2× Big South tournament MVP (1994, 1997)
- Stats at NBA.com
- Stats at Basketball Reference

Peter Olufemi Okiemute Aluma (23 April 1973 – 2 February 2020) was a Nigerian professional basketball player from Lagos. After high school at Okota Grammar School in Isolo, Nigeria, the 2.08-metre (6 ft 10 in) center became a star at Liberty University in Virginia, U.S.

He led the Big South Conference in scoring in 1996 and was the conference's top shot blocker in 1996 with 3.9 bpg and 1997 with 3.0 bpg.

Aluma was a first-team Big South all-conference selection in 1996 and 1997. He earned second-team honors in 1995. He was named to the conference's all-rookie team in 1994. He was named the Big South tournament MVP in 1994 and 1997 and was a three-time all-tournament selection. He was named all-region selection by the National Association of Basketball Coaches (NABC) in 1997.

Aluma was also honored as an all-state team selection by both the Richmond Times-Dispatch and the Virginia Sports Information Directors (VaSID) in 1996 and 1997. In 1996, he was selected for the all-state first team by the Richmond Times-Dispatch.

In April 1997, Aluma was invited to participate in the Portsmouth Invitational Tournament. The P.I.T. invites 64 of the best senior college basketball players from across the nation to participate. It is a four-day, twelve-game tournament. Every NBA team sends scouts to this tournament. He was not invited to attend the NBA's pre-draft camps in Phoenix or Chicago. On 25 June 1997, he was not taken in the 1997 NBA Draft. Aluma did play briefly for the NBA's Sacramento Kings during the lockout-shortened 1998-1999 season. He was waived on 19 February 1999. During the 1999-2000 preseason, he was signed by the Phoenix Suns, but was waived on 16 October 1999. He was invited to join the New York Knicks 2000 summer league team. He was released on 21 July 2000.

In 1998, Alum played professionally in Venezuela for Toros de Aragua. He also played for Nigeria in the 1998 FIBA World Championship. Around February 25, 1999, he was waived by the Connecticut Pride of the Continental Basketball Association (CBA). In 1999, he played in Belarus for the Gomel Wildcats Sozh. In 2001, he played with the Harlem Globetrotters.

Aluma then coached high school basketball at Jefferson Forest High School in Forest, Virginia from 2002 to 2003.

== Personal life ==
Aluma had five children.

Aluma died on 2 February 2020 in Sacramento, California, at the age of 46.
