= List of Liberty Flames basketball head coaches =

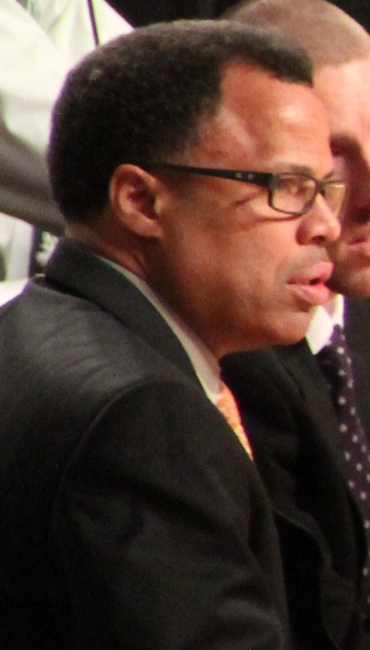
Ritchie McKay, the current head coach of the Liberty Flames.

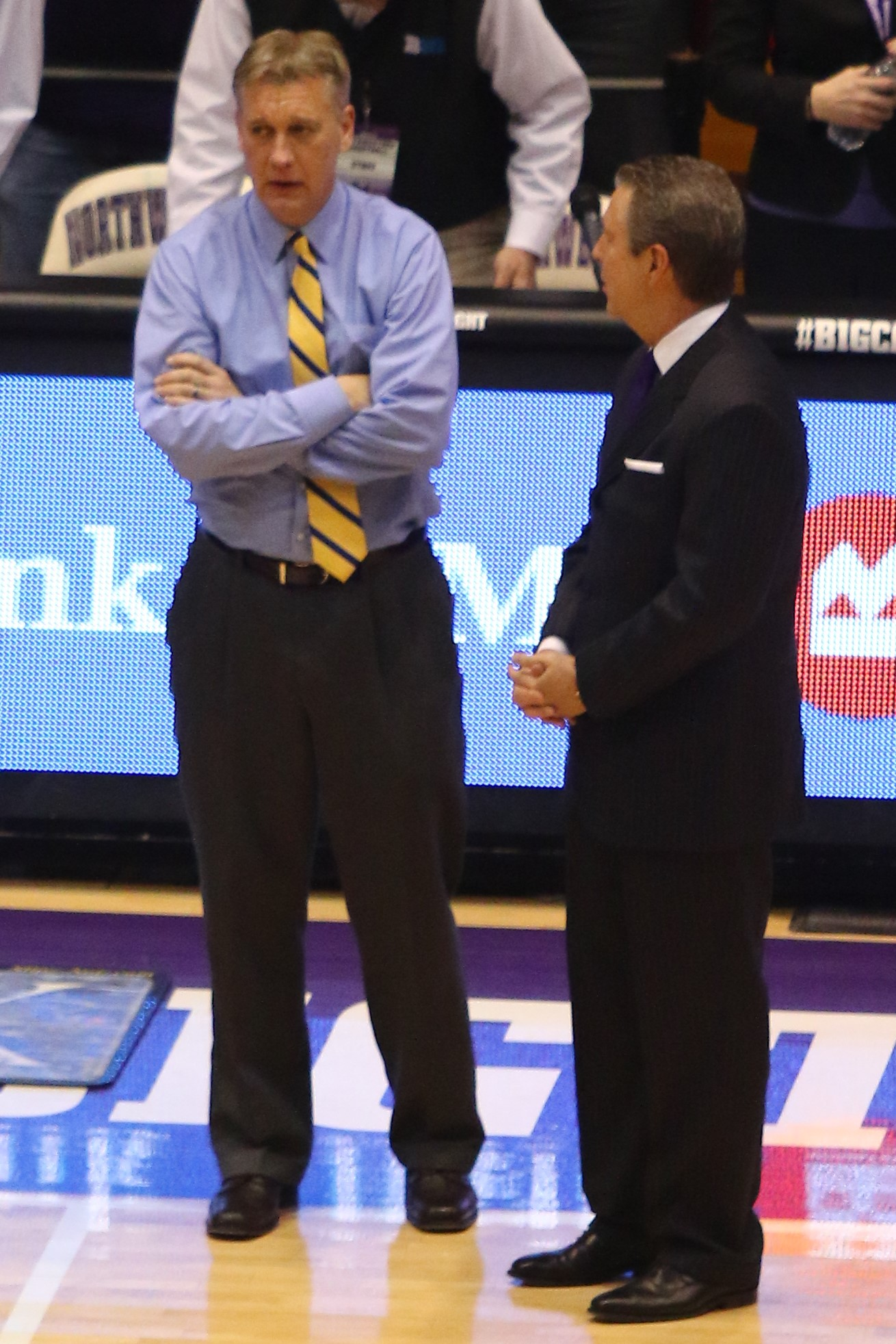
Jeff Meyer, the winningest head coach in Flames basketball history.

The following is a list of Liberty Flames basketball head coaches. There have been eight head coaches of the Flames in their 54-season history.

Liberty's current head coach is Ritchie McKay. He was hired for his second stint as the Flames' head coach in April 2015, replacing Dale Layer, who was fired after the 2014–15 season.

No.	Tenure	Coach	Years	Record	Pct.
1	1972–1977	Dan Manley	5	58–74	.439
2	1977–1978	Skeeter Swift	1	7–22	.241
3	1978–1981	Dale Gibson	3	48–46	.511
4	1981–1997 (Note: Meyer resigned to become assistant to the president at Liberty University. Randy Dunton served as interim head coach for the 1997–98 season.)	Jeff Meyer	16	259–206	.557
5	1997–1998*; 2002–2007 (Note: Dunton's first stint as head coach was as interim head coach for the 1997–98 season, taking over for Jeff Meyer. Four years later, Dunton returned to become the full-time head coach.)	Randy Dunton	6	77–102	.430
6	1998–2002	Mel Hankinson	4	36–77	.319
7	2007–2009; 2015–present	Ritchie McKay	13	298–142	.677
8	2009–2015	Dale Layer	6	82–113	.421
Totals		8 coaches	54 seasons	864–783	.525
Records updated through end of 2025–26 season * - Denotes interim head coach. Source
