= Liberty Flames and Lady Flames =

Athletics teams of Liberty University, in Lynchburg, Virginia, United States

Coordinates: 37.35242°N 79.18018°W

- University: Liberty University
- Nickname: Flames (men); Lady Flames (women)
- NCAA: Division I (FBS)
- Conference: CUSA (primary); Big East (field hockey); ASUN (women's lacrosse); SoCon (men's soccer)
- President: Dondi Costin
- Athletic director: Ian McCaw
- Location: Lynchburg, Virginia
- Varsity teams: 20 (9 men's, 11 women's)
- Football stadium: Williams Stadium
- Basketball arena: Liberty Arena
- Ice hockey arena: LaHaye Ice Center
- Baseball stadium: Liberty Baseball Stadium
- Softball stadium: Kamphuis Field at Liberty Softball Stadium
- Soccer stadium: Osborne Stadium
- Natatorium: Liberty University Natatorium
- Tennis venue: Liberty Tennis Complex
- Indoor track and field venue: Liberty Indoor Track Complex
- Other venues: LaHaye Ice Center
- Colors: Red, Navy Blue, White, and Powder Blue
- Mascot: Sparky Flames
- Marching band: The Spirit of the Mountain
- Fight song: Fan the Flames!
- Website: libertyflames.com

The Liberty Flames and Lady Flames are the athletics teams of Liberty University, in Lynchburg, Virginia, United States. They are a member of the NCAA Division I level in 20 sports. As of July 1, 2023, LU is a member of Conference USA (CUSA) for most sports, joining that league after five years as a member of the Atlantic Sun Conference (ASUN).

The field hockey team was a member of the Northern Pacific Field Hockey Conference before that league's demise after the 2014 season. After playing the 2015 season as an independent, the team joined the Big East Conference in 2016. Women's lacrosse remains in the ASUN, and women's swimming & diving joined the ASUN when it effectively absorbed the swimming & diving side of the Coastal Collegiate Sports Association after the 2022–23 season. Men's soccer competes in the Ohio Valley Conference. In football, Liberty had participated in the NCAA Division I Football Bowl Subdivision as an independent before joining CUSA.

Liberty University is the second youngest school in NCAA Division I, founded in 1971 (the youngest, Florida Gulf Coast University, was founded in 1991 with instruction starting in 1997). (Note: While three other Division I members were officially founded after Florida Gulf Coast, all inherited their athletic programs from predecessor institutions that were D-I members.: The University of Texas Rio Grande Valley (UTRGV) was founded in 2013 by a merger of two other institutions in the University of Texas System and began operation in 2015. UTRGV inherited its athletic program from one of the predecessor institutions, the University of Texas–Pan American, which traced its history to a junior college that opened in 1927.; Purdue University Fort Wayne (PFW) was one of the two new institutions founded in 2018 when the Indiana University and Purdue University systems dissolved Indiana University–Purdue University Fort Wayne (IPFW), which had been founded in 1964. The former IPFW athletic program was entirely transferred to PFW.; Indiana University Indianapolis was one of the two new institutions founded in 2024 when the IU and Purdue systems dissolved Indiana University–Purdue University Indianapolis (IUPUI), which had been founded in 1969. The former IUPUI athletic program transferred to IU Indianapolis, with a new athletic brand name of IU Indy.; A fourth Division I member, Florida International University, was founded before Liberty in 1965, but did not start classes until 1972, a year after Liberty started classes. Also, FIU did not admit freshmen or sophomores until 1981.) As a member of the Big South Conference, Liberty regularly competed for the Sasser Cup, which is the trophy for the university which has the best sports program among the member institutions. Liberty won the Sasser Cup 14 times, the most in Big South Conference history.

On February 16, 2017, the NCAA approved Liberty's football program move to the FBS for the 2018 season. Liberty has competed as an FBS independent since that time. On May 17, 2018, it was announced that the Flames would move from the Big South to the ASUN starting in 2018.

In November 2021, Liberty was announced as a new member of CUSA, which took effect for the 2023–24 school year.

== Conference affiliations ==
- Big South Conference (1991–2018)
- ASUN Conference (2018–2023)
- Conference USA (2023–present)

== Athletics ==
Men's sports	Division	Women's sports	Division
Baseball	NCAA D1 (CUSA)	Softball	NCAA D1 (CUSA)
Basketball	NCAA D1 (CUSA)	Basketball	NCAA D1 (CUSA)
Cross country	NCAA D1 (CUSA)	Cross country	NCAA D1 (CUSA)
Football	NCAA D1 (CUSA)	Lacrosse	NCAA D1 (ASUN affiliate member)
Golf	NCAA D1 (CUSA)	Field hockey	NCAA D1 (Big East affiliate member)
Soccer	NCAA D1 (SoCon affiliate member)	Soccer	NCAA D1 (CUSA)
Tennis	NCAA D1 (CUSA)	Tennis	NCAA D1 (CUSA)
Track and field^{1}	NCAA D1 (CUSA)	Track and field^{1}	NCAA D1 (CUSA)
Hockey (D1, D2, D3)	ACHA Club (Independent)	Hockey (D1, D2)	ACHA Club (Independent)
Volleyball	Club	Swimming & Diving	NCAA D1 (AAC affiliate member)
Beach Volleyball	Club	Beach Volleyball	NCAA D1 (CUSA)
Wrestling	Club	Wrestling	Club
Air Pistol	Club	Air Pistol	Club
Taekwando	Club	Taekwando	Club
Disc Golf	Club	Disc Golf	Club
Equestrian	Club	Equestrian	Club
Cycling	Club	Cycling	Club
Lacrosse	Club	Synchronized Skating	Club
Racquetball	Club	Racquetball	Club
Rock Climbing	Club	Rock Climbing	Club
Archery	Club	Archery	Club
Rowing	Club	Rowing	Club
Ski & Snowboarding	Club	Ski & Snowboarding	Club
Shotgun	Club	Shotgun	Club
Ultimate Frisbee	Club	Ultimate Frisbee	Club
Triathlon	Club	Triathlon	Club
		Figure Skating	Club
		Dance	Club
		Gymnastics	Club
^{1} – includes both indoor and outdoor

=== Baseball ===
Conference USA logo in Liberty's colors

The baseball program began in 1974 and has seen four alumni enter Major League Baseball, including Doug Brady, Sid Bream, Lee Guetterman, and Randy Tomlin. Liberty Baseball has appeared in three NAIA Baseball World Series, finishing fifth in 1980, 1981, and 1982. The Flames made their first appearance in the NCAA Division I Baseball Championship Tournament in 1993, after the university moved athletics to NCAA Division I in 1989. The program has since appeared in the tournament in 1998 and 2000. The program made it to the regional tournament finals in 2013 for the first time before falling to tournament host South Carolina.

=== Basketball ===
==== Men's basketball ====
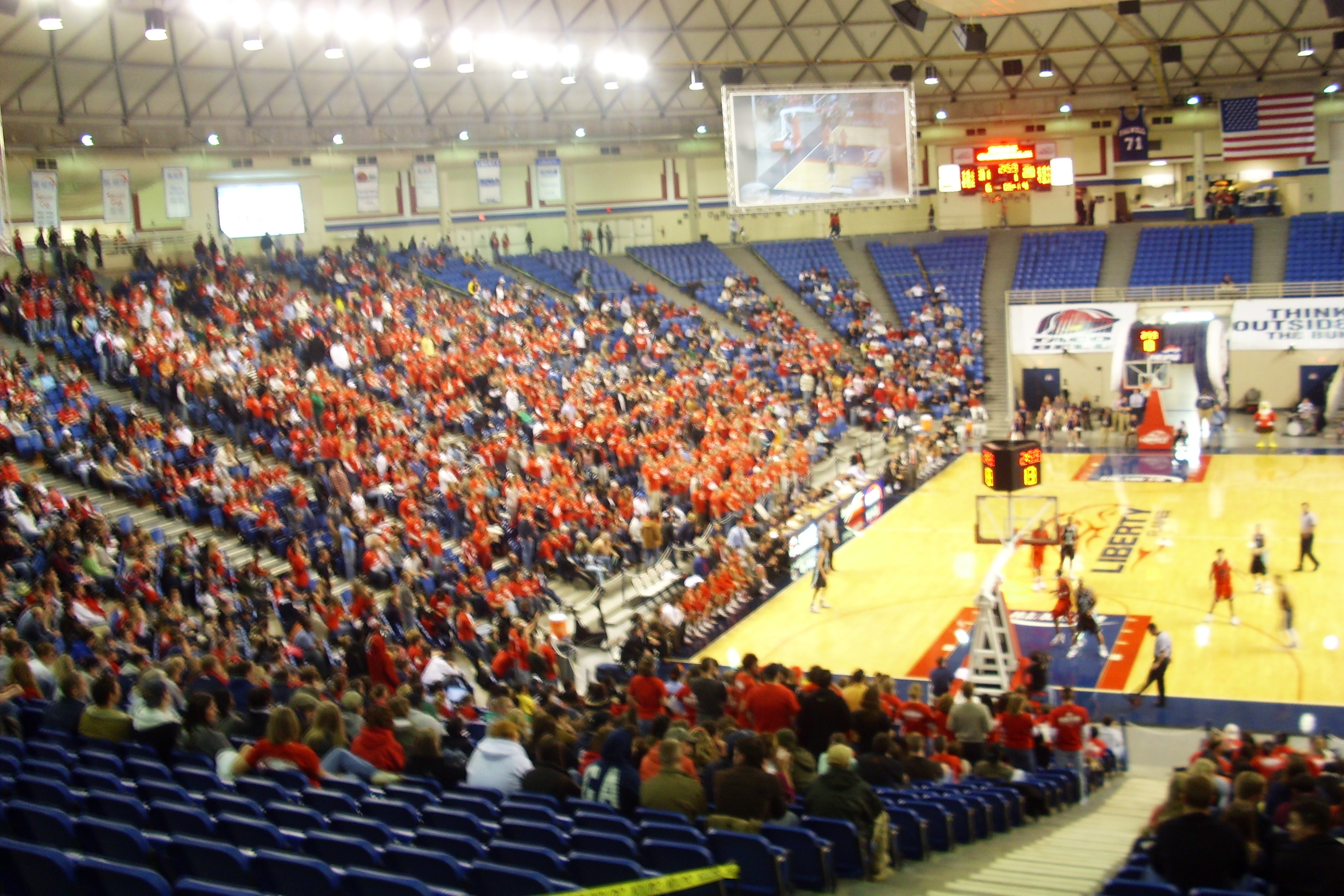
Liberty Flames men's basketball game at Vines Center in 2008

The Liberty Flames men's basketball program began in 1972 under head coach Dan Manley. The Flames finished 13-14 in the inaugural season. As of the 2009–10 season, the Flames have had 8 different head coaches of their men's team (Dan Manley (1972–77), Harley Swift (1977–78), Dale Gibson (1978–81), Jeff Meyer (1981–97), Randy Dunton (1997–98 and 2003–07), Mel Hankinson (1998–03), Ritchie McKay (2007–09 and 2015–present) and Dale Layer (2009–2015). As of the start of the 2019-2020 season, the Flames have an overall record of 691–723.

Liberty has reached the postseason eight times in its NCAA Division I history. The Flames fell to North Carolina (71–51) in the first round of the 1994 NCAA tournament after winning the Big South tournament. Liberty lost to St. Joseph's (82–63) in the 2004 NCAA tournament after defeating High Point (89–44) to claim its second Big South Conference tournament championship. Upon falling in the semi-finals of the Big South Conference tournament in the 2008–09 season, the Flames were invited to the inaugural CollegeInsider.com Postseason Tournament (CIT). Liberty defeated Rider in the first round before falling to James Madison in the quarterfinals. Their next postseason appearance was in 2013, when they won the Big South tournament and followed it with a loss to North Carolina A&T in the First Four of the NCAA Tournament. The 2016–17 season was the first of four consecutive seasons in which the Flames advanced to the postseason, with another CIT appearance. The Flames defeated Norfolk State and Samford before losing to UMBC (which would go on to score a historic upset of Virginia in the next season's NCAA tournament). They again made the CIT in 2018, defeating North Carolina A&T and Central Michigan before losing to UIC. In the Flames' first ASUN season of 2018–19, they won the ASUN Tournament and scored their first NCAA tournament win in an upset over Mississippi State. They lost in the second round to Virginia Tech. The Flames won the ASUN Tournament again in 2020, but the NCAA tournament was not held due to COVID-19.

==== Women's basketball ====
The University gained some media attention in the winter of 2005 when their women's basketball team, the Lady Flames led by Katie Feenstra, made the Sweet Sixteen of the 2005 NCAA Division I women's basketball tournament, being labeled a "Cinderella" team. After defeating fourth-seeded Penn State and fifth-seeded DePaul, the Flames' winning streak was halted by top-seeded LSU. Feenstra was later drafted by the San Antonio Silver Stars (now Las Vegas Aces) of the WNBA. The Lady Flames competed for the Big South's 2012 regular season and tournament championships. In the regular season, the Lady Flames went 16-2 in conference play to clinch the Big South's regular season title. In addition, the Lady Flames won the Big South Conference Tournament, beating High Point University 81-73.

=== Football ===
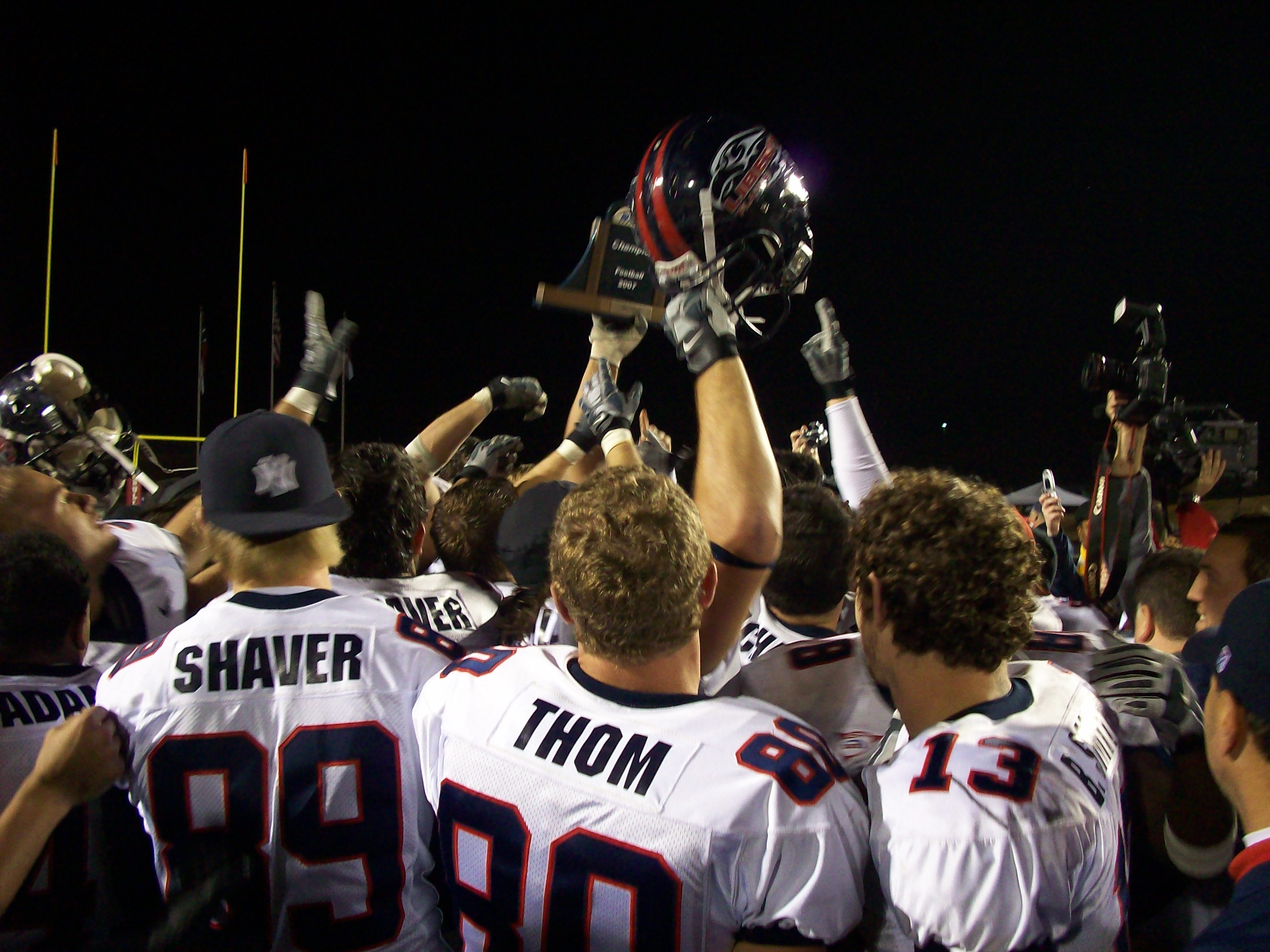
Liberty Flames football in 2007

Liberty's football program is headed by Jamey Chadwell. Liberty plays its home games at Williams Stadium.

==== 2007 Big South Conference champions ====
The Liberty Flames captured their first Big South Conference football championship with a 31-0 victory over Gardner–Webb University. The Flames capped off their second year under head coach Danny Rocco with an 8-3 record and a 4-0 Big South record to claim the title. The same week, The Liberty University men's soccer team beat Radford University, 2-1, to capture the Big South Conference soccer title and its first appearance in the national tournament. Also that same week, the Liberty Women's Volleyball team shutout Winthrop in the finals of the Big South Volleyball tournament. it was the first conference championship for the volleyball team since 2001. The Liberty Men's and Women's cross country teams also won the Big South Championship with Josh McDougal, Jordan McDougal and Jarvis Jelen sweeping the top 3 positions in the men's race for the third straight year.

==== 2008 Big South Conference champions ====
Topping its 2007 performance, Liberty ran its unbeaten Big South streak to 11-straight games, finishing back-to-back conference championship seasons with a 30-10 victory over Gardner–Webb. The Flames finished with a 10-2 record on the year and finished the conference slate unbeaten at 5-0. Liberty's victory allowed the Flames to become the first team in Big South history to win five conference games in a season and to join Gardner–Webb as the only two teams to post consecutive unbeaten seasons. Liberty finished ranked 15th in the FCS Coaches Poll and 14th in the Sports Network Poll.

==== 2024 Conference USA champions ====
Jamey Chadwell took over the Liberty football program ahead of the 2023 season and lead it to unprecedented heights. In their first year in CUSA, the Flames finished a perfect 12-0 regular season, including an 8-0 conference record that allowed them to host the 2023 Conference USA Championship Game. The Flames defeated New Mexico State 49-35 to claim the CUSA title in their first season in the league. As a result, the Flames received the Group of 5 berth in the New Year's Six bowl games, before falling to Oregon in the Fiesta Bowl and finishing the season with a 13-1 record and ranked 25th in the final AP poll. Quarterback Kaidon Salter was named CUSA Most Valuable Player while Linebacker Tyler Dupree won Defensive Player of the Year, Running back Quinton Cooley won Newcomer of the Year, and Coach Chadwell won Coach of the Year.

=== Track and field ===
==== Championships ====
Sam Chelanga holds the NCAA record for the 10,000 meters run with a time of 27:08.49 set at the Payton Jordan Cardinal Invitational at Palo Alto, California on May 1, 2010. Competing in cross country and the 5,000 and 10,000 meters, between 2009 and 2011, he won four NCAA Division I championship gold medals and three silvers. Josh McDougall won the cross country title in 2007, after finishing third the previous year.

In 2016, Head Coach Brant Tolsma notched his 100th conference championship over a 31-year coaching career with the Flames. Tolsma received Women's Coach of the Year honors, his 63rd Big South Coach of the Year Award. The Lady Flames cross country team won their first conference title since 2012. That year the Liberty's men's cross country squad finished runner-up behind Campbell University. The Flames were runner up three years in a row and have posted 14 consecutive top-two Big South finishes.

Clarence Powell is a decorated track and field athlete who competed for Liberty University from 2008 to 2011, specializing in the triple jump, long jump, and high jump. Over his collegiate career, Powell earned 16 All-Big South honors and won six Big South Conference individual titles.

In his senior year (2011), Powell won the Big South indoor triple jump title for the third time and placed second in the long jump. In 2010, he had his best season, qualifying for the NCAA Division I Outdoor Championships and breaking Liberty and Big South triple jump records with a 52-1.25 (15.88m) effort. That year, he was named Big South Men's Outstanding Field Performer both indoors and outdoors.

During his sophomore year (2009), despite injuries, Powell continued to excel, placing in multiple events at the Big South Championships and setting a new school indoor triple jump record. As a freshman in 2008, he was named Big South Men's Freshman of the Year and captured titles in the indoor and outdoor triple jump. Powell’s personal bests include 52-1.25 in the triple jump, 24-9.75 in the long jump, and 7-0.25 in the high jump.

Powell attended Cottondale High School, where he was a two-time Florida state champion in the triple jump. He graduated from Liberty with a major in graphic design.

== Club sports ==
=== Men's ice hockey ===
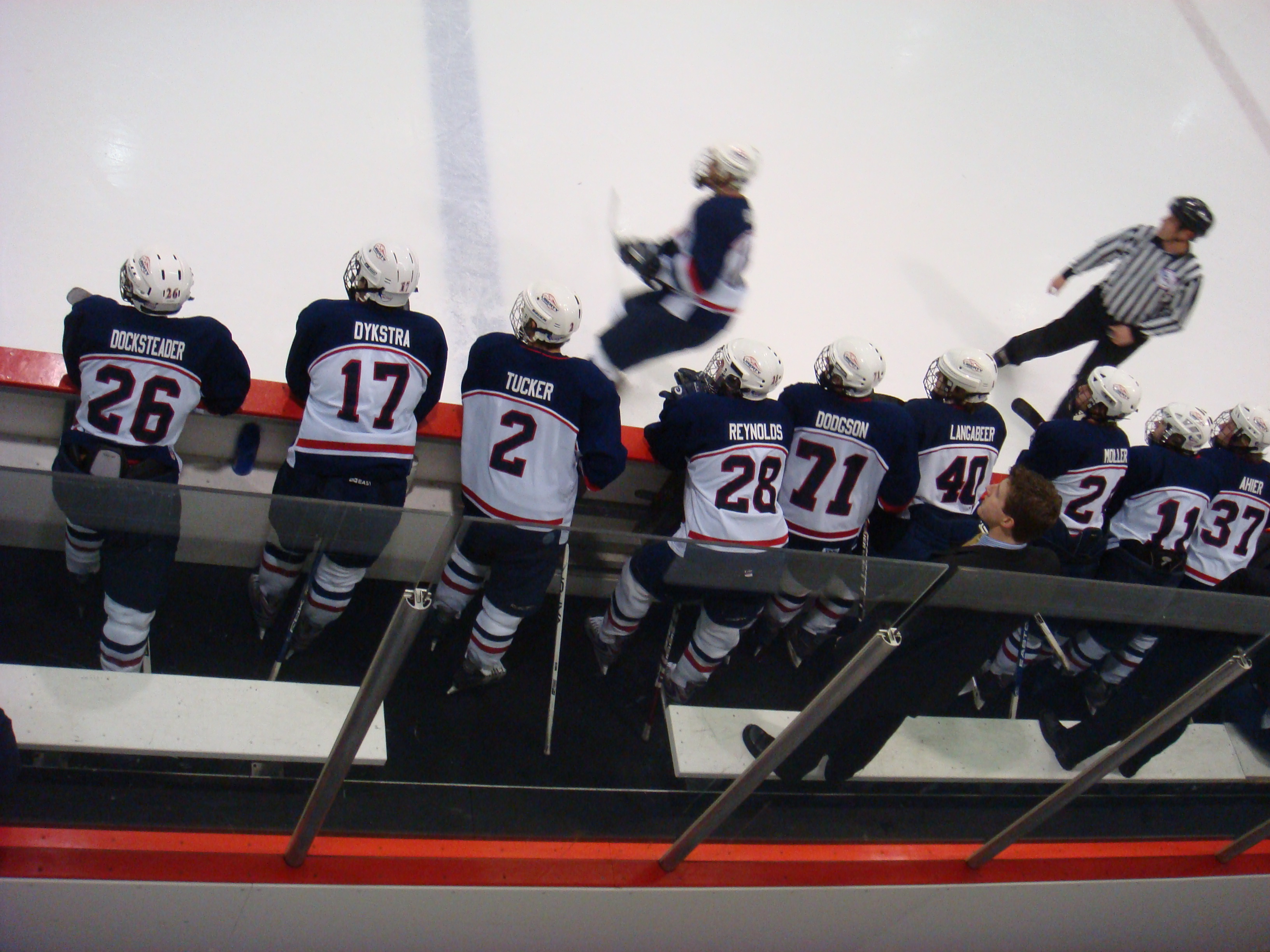
Liberty Hockey Team

The men's ice hockey team competes at the Division I level of the American Collegiate Hockey Association (ACHA). The team plays at the LaHaye Ice Center.

Men's ice hockey finished the 2009–2010 season ranked 10th in the ACHA DI. LU went 23–3–3 and won a bid to the 2010 ACHA Division I Championships in Chicago, Illinois, The team lost 7–3 in the first round to Arizona State. In addition to the ACHA DI team the University also fields JV teams playing at the ACHA DII and DIII levels.

Liberty won the University Hockey League Championship in the 2004–05 season.

=== Men's wrestling ===
In 2011, Liberty announced that it would no longer sponsor a varsity wrestling team, citing Title IX concerns. The team had competed as an independent NCAA Division I program from 2006–2011 since the Big South Conference does not host a wrestling championship. Liberty University previously had wrestling teams from 1974 to 1994. The reinstatement of the wrestling program was aided by the support of the Liberty University Wrestling Foundation. Since its reclassification in 2012, the wrestling team has participated in the National Collegiate Wrestling Association where it has won four national duals titles and four grand national titles.

== Facilities ==
=== Williams Stadium ===
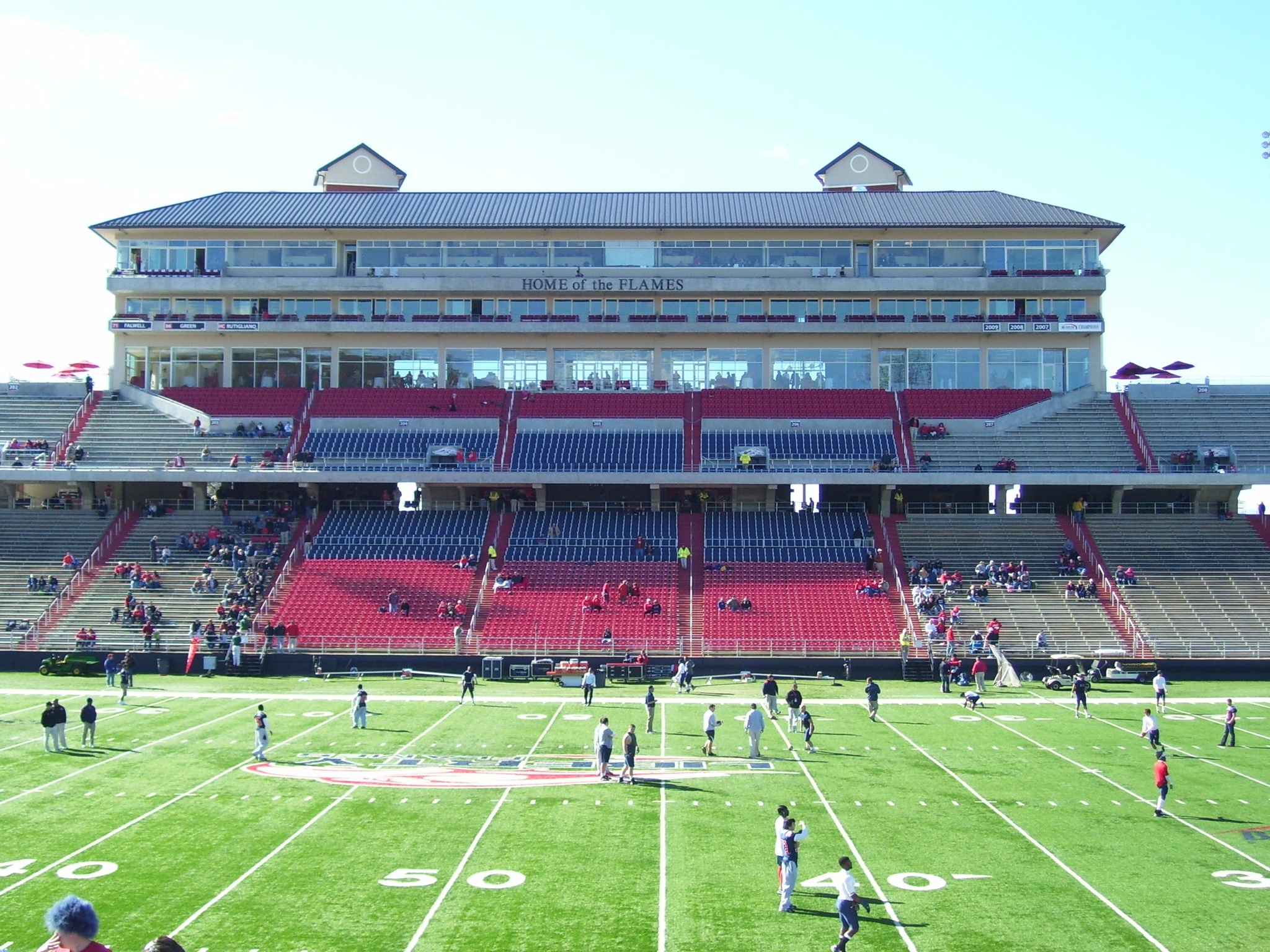
Williams Stadium

Williams Stadium is the football stadium located on the campus of Liberty University. The stadium was built in 1989 and plays host to the football team. The stadium originally seated 12,000 fans. The first phase of a planned renovation was completed October 2, 2010.

Williams Stadium now has a five-story press tower. In addition, 7,200 more seats were installed by adding a second deck to the home side of the stadium and lengthening both the east and west stands of the stadium. The seating capacity is currently 25,000.

=== Liberty Arena ===
Liberty Arena is a 4,000-seat multi-purpose arena completed in 2020 that is now the primary home of the Flames and Lady Flames basketball teams, as well as women's volleyball. Located next to the Vines Center, the former home of the aforementioned teams, and connected to that facility by a tunnel, it was officially opened on November 23, 2020, with the first event, a Lady Flames basketball game, held on December 1.

=== Vines Center ===
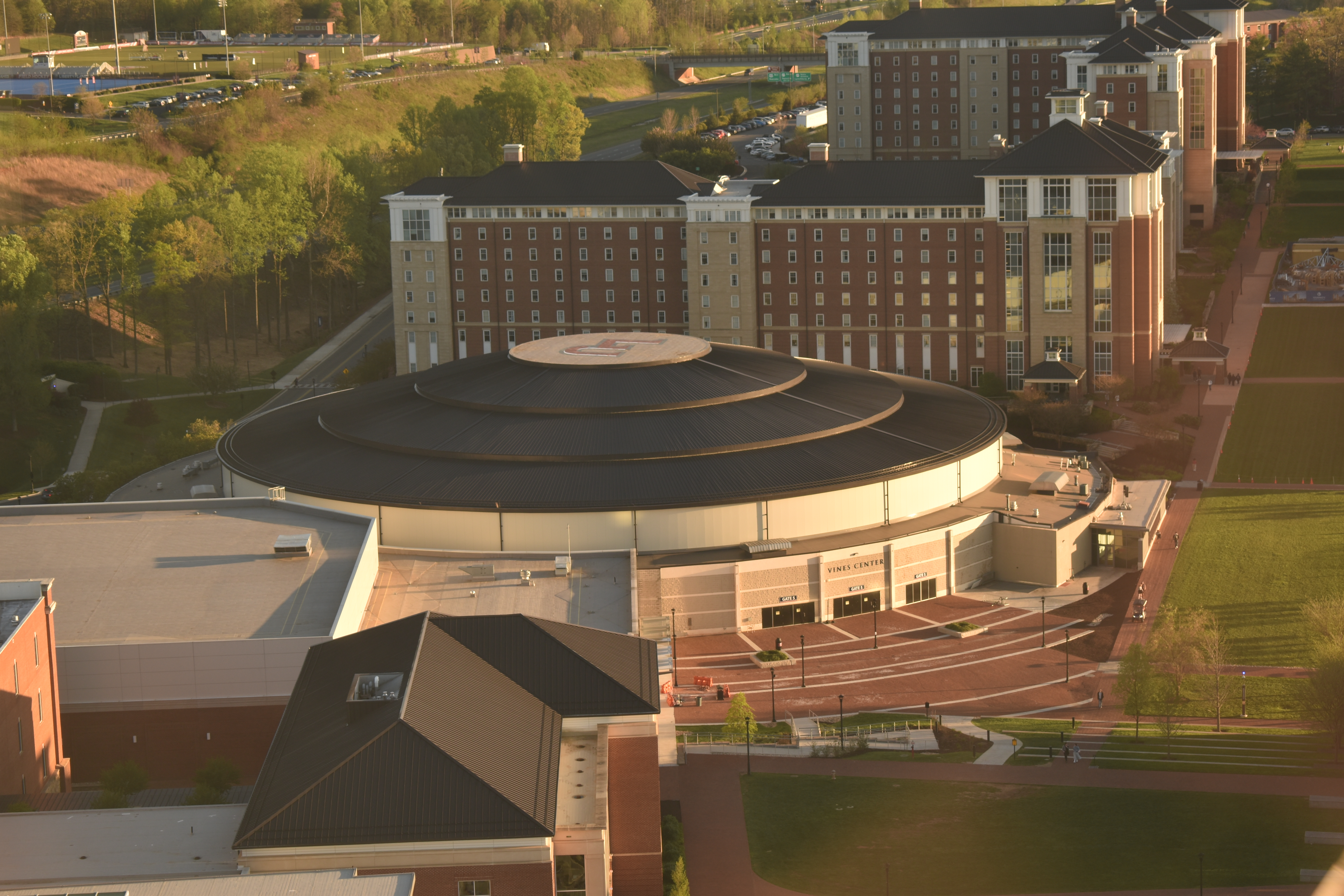
Vines Center

Vines Center is an 8,085-seat multi-purpose arena. It was built in 1990 and was home to the Flames and Lady Flames basketball teams, as well as women's volleyball, until the opening of Liberty Arena. The Vines Center was also home to men's wrestling until that program was downgraded from varsity to club status in 2011. It hosted the Big South Conference men's basketball tournament from 1995–98, and also all rounds of the tourney except for the first round in 2003 and 2004. In the fall of 2008 the Vines Center underwent a major renovation of all seating. New red-and-blue cushioned seats were installed and new blue plastic game seats were put in place. On August 28, 2009, university Chancellor Jerry Falwell, Jr. announced that the University planned to upgrade seating in the Vines center from 8,000 to 11,000 for athletic contests and 12,000 for convocations. A further addition to the facility was completed in 2013, featuring new practice courts, locker rooms, and coaches' office for the basketball teams. The Vines Center remains in use for university events, and will still be available for high-demand sporting events.

=== LaHaye Ice Center ===
LaHaye Ice Center was built in 2005 and opened in 2006. The Ice Center has a 3,000-seat capacity and is the home of the Flames and Lady Flames hockey teams.

=== Liberty Baseball Stadium ===
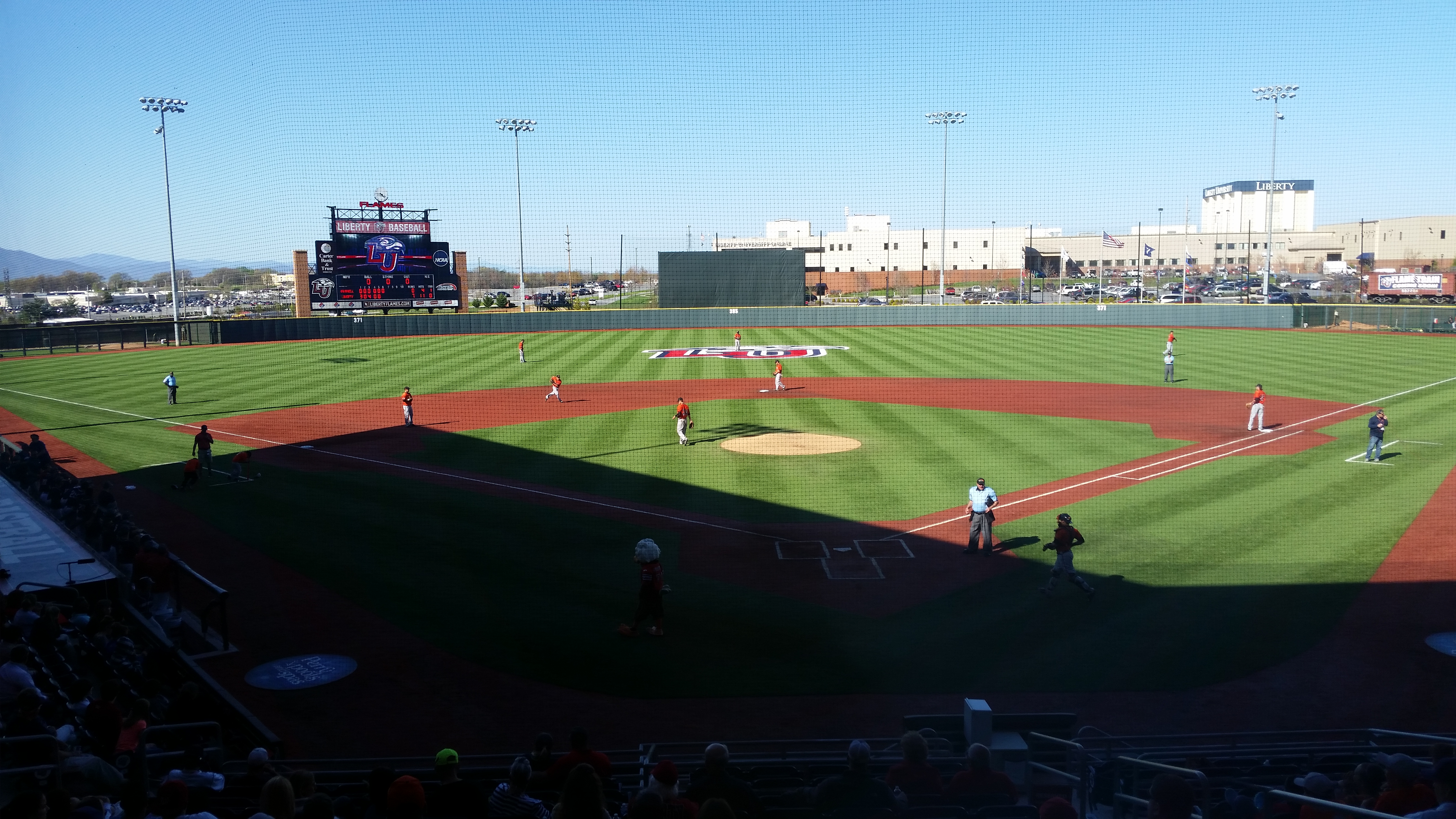
Liberty Baseball Stadium

Liberty Baseball Stadium is a 2,500-seat baseball stadium opened in 2013. It is the home field of the Liberty Flames baseball team.

=== Other ===
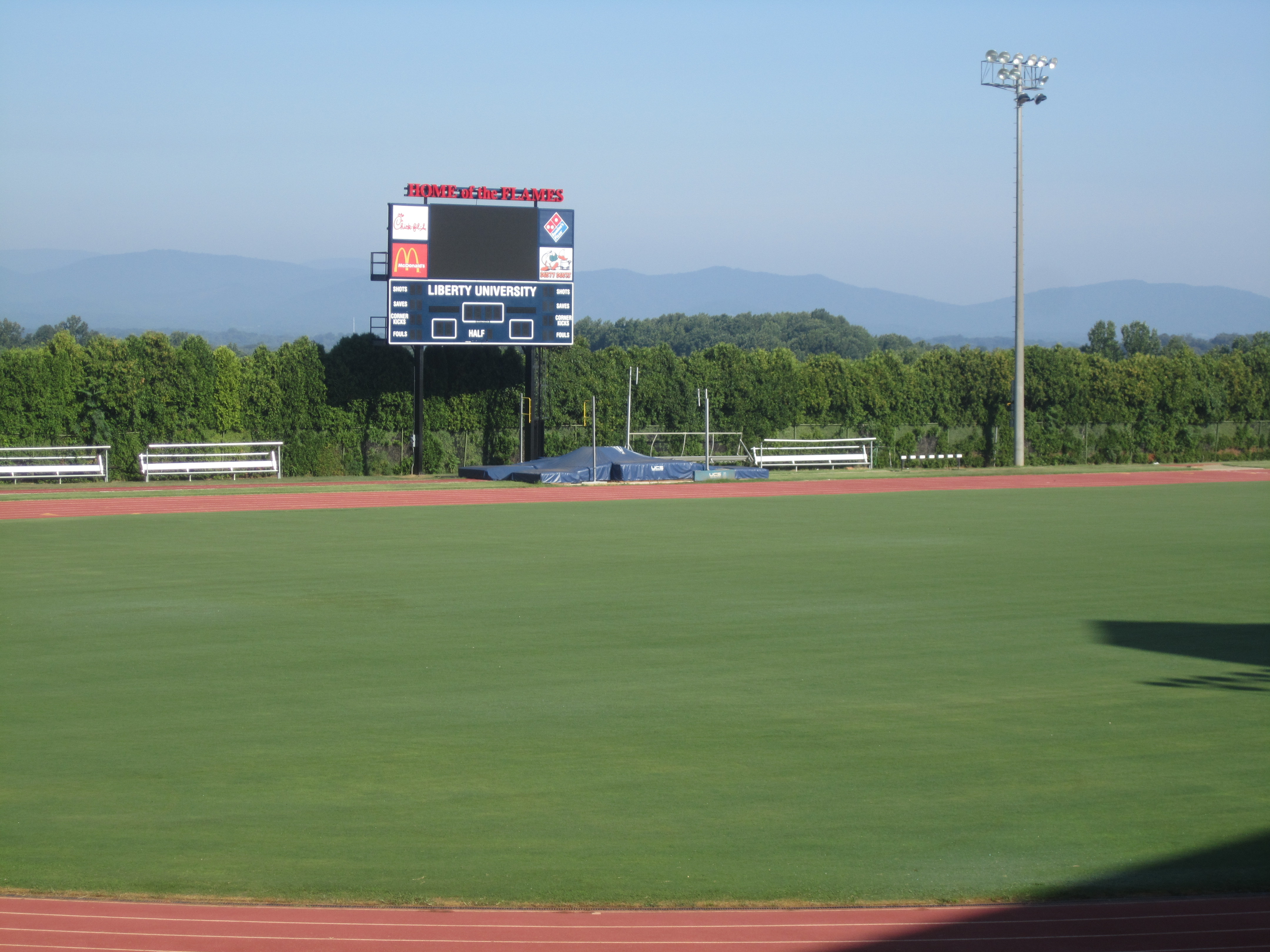
The Liberty University track field

- Osborne Stadium is a 1,000-seat natural grass stadium and home to the men's and women's soccer teams, as well as women's lacrosse – one of the newest athletic programs at Liberty. Osborne was built in 2009 and is the newest athletic facility on campus.
- Tolsma Indoor Track Center is located in Liberty's Campus North building. The indoor track was constructed in 2006 and has a 1,000-seat capacity. Amenities include a flat 200-meter oval track with four lanes around the curves, eight-lane straightaways, a pair of long jump/triple jump runways, a pole vault runway, a high jump apron, and a throwing circle.
- Liberty Softball Field is a 500-seat natural grass outdoor softball stadium built in 1993. It is home to the Flames softball team.
- Matthes-Hopkins Track Complex is an outdoor track complex built in 1989 for the track teams. The complex seats 500 and includes an eight-lane, 400-meter track, four long jump/triple jump pits, three pole vault runways, a high jump apron, two javelin runways, two shot put rings, and a hammer/discus throwing area. The facility has hosted six of the 15 Big South Men's and Women's Outdoor Track & Field Championships.
- LU Tennis Courts

== Mascot ==
The official mascot of Liberty University is Sparky Flames, appearing at sporting events, pep rallies, university ceremonies, alumni events, and community outreach programs in the Lynchburg area. The mascot is also featured in promotional campaigns for Liberty University and in social media.

Liberty University adopted the eagle as its mascot in the 1970s, shortly after the school's founding as Lynchburg Baptist College in 1971. The eagle was chosen for its association with strength, freedom, and biblical imagery, including Isaiah 40:31: "But they who wait for the Lord shall renew their strength; they shall mount up with wings like eagles; they shall run and not be weary; they shall walk and not faint."

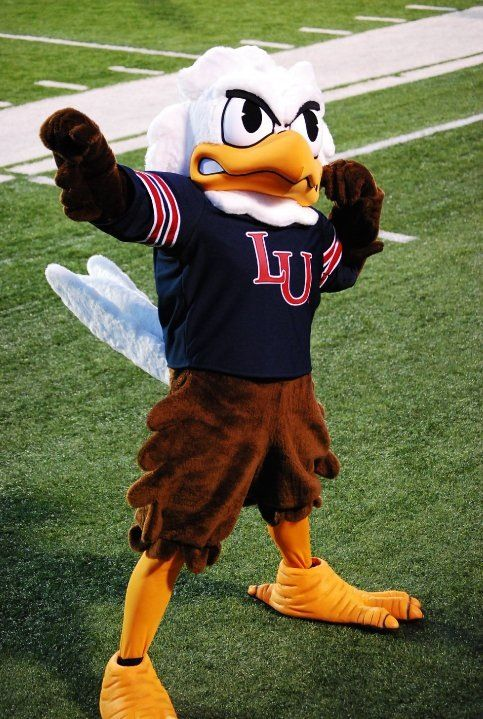
An old version of Sparky Flames

The mascot was introduced in the 1980s to provide a recognizable character that could engage fans and promote school spirit. Over the years, Sparky's costume has undergone several redesigns to modernize its look while retaining the eagle motif.
