= 2025–26 Liberty Flames basketball team =

American college basketball season

2025–26 Liberty Flames basketball

Conference USA regular season champions

NIT, Second Round
- Conference: Conference USA
- Record: 26–8 (17–3 CUSA)
- Head coach: Ritchie McKay (11th, 13th overall season)
- Associate head coach: Derek Johnston
- Assistant coaches: Stephen Burggraf; Kyle Rode
- Home arena: Liberty Arena

2025–26 Conference USA men's basketball standings
	Conf.				Overall
Team	W		L	PCT	W		L	PCT
Liberty	17	–	3	.850	26	–	8	.765
Sam Houston	13	–	7	.650	22	–	12	.647
Western Kentucky	11	–	9	.550	18	–	14	.563
Louisiana Tech	11	–	9	.550	20	–	14	.588
Middle Tennessee	11	–	9	.550	17	–	15	.531
Kennesaw State †	10	–	10	.500	21	–	14	.600
Jacksonville State	10	–	10	.500	15	–	17	.469
FIU	8	–	12	.400	15	–	17	.469
Missouri State	8	–	12	.400	16	–	18	.471
New Mexico State	8	–	12	.400	16	–	16	.500
UTEP	7	–	13	.350	11	–	20	.355
Delaware	6	–	14	.300	10	–	21	.323
† 2026 CUSA tournament winner

The 2025–26 Liberty Flames basketball team represented Liberty University in the 2025–26 NCAA Division I men's basketball season. The Flames were led by Ritchie McKay in the eleventh season of his current stint as head coach (13th overall). They played their home games at Liberty Arena in Lynchburg, Virginia as members of Conference USA.

== Previous season ==
The Flames finished the 2024–25 season 28–7, 16–5 in C-USA play to finish in first place. As the No. 1 seed in the C-USA tournament they defeated the 8th seed UTEP in the quarterfinals, the 4th seed Kennesaw State in the semifinals, and the 2nd seed Jacksonville State in the championship game to secure their first CUSA championship.

The Flames were a 12-seed in the 2025 NCAA Division I men's basketball tournament and faced 5th seed Oregon in Seattle as part of the East Regional. Oregon would eliminate Liberty by 29 points.

== Offseason ==
=== Departures ===
Name	Number	Pos.	Height	Weight	Year	Hometown	Reason for departure
Taelon Peter	2	G	6'4"	210	(redshirt) Senior	Russellville, Arkansas	Graduated drafted by the Indiana Pacers
Bryson Spell	5	F	6'9"	230	(redshirt) Junior	Virginia Beach, Virginia	Transferred to Elon
Owen Aquino	8	F	6'9"	220	Junior	Madrid, Spain	Transferred to High Point
Will Gibson	15	F	6'6	225	Freshman	Louisville, Kentucky	Transferred to Cedarville
Gaberial McKay	21	G	6'2"	180	(redshirt) Senior	Lynchburg, Virginia	Graduated
Curtis Blair III	24	G	6'6"	210	(redshirt) Freshman	Richmond, Virginia	Transferred to Cedarville
Jayvon Maughmer	32	G	6'6"	205	(redshirt) Senior	Chillicothe, Ohio	Graduated
Kai Yu	45	F	7'0"	235	(redshirt) Freshman	Zhuhai, China	Transferred to Bradley

=== Incoming transfers ===
Name	Number	Pos.	Height	Weight	Year	Hometown	Previous college
JJ Harper	9	G	6'5"	200	(redshirt) Senior	Orlando, Florida	West Liberty
Ryan Jones Jr.	21	F	6'8"	240	(redshirt) Freshman	Gainesville, Florida	Virginia Tech

=== 2025 recruiting class ===
College recruiting
Name	Hometown	School	Height	Weight	Commit date
Zander Carter; G	Greenup, Kentucky	Paul G. Blazer High School	6 ft 6 in (1.98 m)	N/A	Jun 19, 2023
Zander Carter; G	Recruit ratings: No ratings found				
TJ Drain; F	Windermere, Florida	Windermere High School	6 ft 7 in (2.01 m)	N/A	Aug 31, 2024
TJ Drain; F	Recruit ratings: No ratings found				
Brady Kester; F	Huntersville, North Carolina	Davidson Day School	6 ft 8 in (2.03 m)	N/A	N/A
Brady Kester; F	Recruit ratings: No ratings found				
Andrew Grimes; F	Clayton, North Carolina	Clayton High School	6 ft 8 in (2.03 m)	N/A	Sep 4, 2023
Andrew Grimes; F	Recruit ratings: No ratings found				
Torr Sorensen; F	Goode, Virginia	Western Reserve Academy	6 ft 7 in (2.01 m)	N/A	Oct 9, 2023
Torr Sorensen; F	Recruit ratings: No ratings found				
Overall recruit ranking:
Note: In many cases, Scout, Rivals, 247Sports, On3, and ESPN may conflict in their listings of height and weight.; In these cases, the average was taken. ESPN grades are on a 100-point scale.; Sources: "2025 Team Ranking". Rivals.

== Roster ==
2024–25 Liberty Flames men's basketball team
Players
Coaches

Pos.	#	Name	Height	Weight	Year	Previous school	Hometown
G	0	Colin Porter	5 ft 9 in (1.75 m)	170 lb (77 kg)	Sr	Paul G. Blazer HS	Ashland, Kentucky
G	1	Zander Carter	6 ft 6 in (1.98 m)	195 lb (88 kg)	Fr	Paul G. Blazer HS	Greenup, Kentucky
G	3	Kaden Metheny	5 ft 10 in (1.78 m)	170 lb (77 kg)	GS	Bowling Green	Morgantown, West Virginia
G	4	Brett Decker Jr.	6 ft 4 in (1.93 m)	190 lb (86 kg)	So	Central Hardin HS	Cecilia, Kentucky
F	7	Isaiah Ihnen (injured)	6 ft 9 in (2.06 m)	220 lb (100 kg)	RS Jr	Minnesota	Böblingen, Germany
G	9	JJ Harper	6 ft 5 in (1.96 m)	200 lb (91 kg)	RS Sr	West Liberty	Orlando, Florida
G	10	JC Shirer Jr. (W)	6 ft 3 in (1.91 m)	195 lb (88 kg)	RS So	Grace Preparatory Academy	Arlington, Texas
F	11	Zander Yates	6 ft 8 in (2.03 m)	225 lb (102 kg)	RS Jr	Creighton	Germantown, Tennessee
F	12	Josh Smith	6 ft 9 in (2.06 m)	225 lb (102 kg)	Sr	Stetson	Monrovia, Indiana
F	15	Drew Grimes	6 ft 9 in (2.06 m)	205 lb (93 kg)	Fr	Clayton High School	Goldsboro, North Carolina
F	20	Torr Sorensen	6 ft 7 in (2.01 m)	220 lb (100 kg)	Fr	Western Reserve Academy	Goode, Virginia
F	21	Ryan Jones Jr.	6 ft 8 in (2.03 m)	240 lb (109 kg)	RS Fr	Virginia Tech	Gainesville, Florida
F	23	TJ Drain	6 ft 8 in (2.03 m)	220 lb (100 kg)	Fr	Windermere High School	Windermere, Florida
F	24	Brady Kester (W)	6 ft 8 in (2.03 m)	220 lb (100 kg)	Fr	Davidson Day School	Huntersville, North Carolina
F	25	Zach Cleveland	6 ft 7 in (2.01 m)	220 lb (100 kg)	Jr	Normal Community HS	Bloomington, Illinois

Head coach

- Ritchie McKay (Seattle Pacific))

Assistant coach(es)

- Derek Johnston (Associate HC) (Alabama–Huntsville)
- Stephen Burggraf (Liberty)
- Kyle Rode (Liberty)

Legend

- (C) Team captain
- (S) Suspended
- (I) Ineligible
- (W) Walk-on
- Injured
- Current redshirt

Roster

== Schedule and results ==
Date time, TV	Rank^{#}	Opponent^{#}	Result	Record	High points	High rebounds	High assists	Site (attendance) city, state
Non-conference regular season
November 3, 2025*; 7:00 p.m., ESPN+		Kentucky Christian	W 98–57	1–0	29 – Decker Jr.	10 – Cleveland	6 – Porter	Liberty Arena (3,431); Lynchburg, Virginia
November 7, 2025*; 6:00 p.m., YouTube		Charleston; Field of 68 Media Network Tip-Off Event	W 90–75	2–0	23 – Porter	10 – Cleveland	8 – Cleveland	Liberty Arena (3,998); Lynchburg, Virginia
November 9, 2025*; 6:00 p.m., YouTube		Florida Atlantic; Field of 68 Media Network Tip-Off Event	W 88–68	3–0	28 – Metheny	10 – Cleveland	10 – Cleveland	Liberty Arena (3,722); Lynchburg, Virginia
November 17, 2025*; 7:00 p.m., ESPN+		Carolina	W 98–46	4–0	15 – Tied	10 – Cleveland	9 – Cleveland	Liberty Arena (3,513); Lynchburg, Virginia
November 24, 2025*; 1:30 p.m., ESPNU		vs. Vermont; Terry's Chocolate ESPN Events Invitational	W 79–73	5–0	23 – Decker Jr.	6 – Cleveland	7 – Cleveland	State Farm Field House (1,315); Kissimmee, Florida
November 25, 2025*; 12:00 p.m., ESPN2		vs. Towson; Terry's Chocolate ESPN Events Invitational	L 69–72	5–1	16 – Metheny	8 – Cleveland	7 – Cleveland	State Farm Field House (957); Kissimmee, Florida
November 26, 2025*; 2:30 p.m., ESPNU		vs. Bradley; Terry's Chocolate ESPN Events Invitational	L 64–74	5–2	21 – Decker Jr.	11 – Cleveland	8 – Cleveland	State Farm Field House (547); Kissimmee, Florida
December 6, 2025*; 2:00 p.m., ESPN+		Coppin State	W 92–50	6–2	20 – Decker Jr.	7 – Tied	13 – Cleveland	Liberty Arena (2,878); Lynchburg, Virginia
December 10, 2025*; 7:00 p.m., ACC Network		at NC State	L 45–85	6–3	12 – Tied	7 – Cleveland	5 – Cleveland	Lenovo Center (14,515); Raleigh, North Carolina
December 16, 2025*; 6:00 p.m., ESPN+		Midway	W 95–57	7–3	14 – Tied	5 – Tied	5 – Tied	Liberty Arena (2,250); Lynchburg, Virginia
December 20, 2025*; 12:30 p.m., USA Network		at Dayton	W 64–61	8–3	16 – Metheny	16 – Cleveland	7 – Cleveland	UD Arena (13,407); Dayton, Ohio
Conference USA regular season
December 28, 2025; 2:00 p.m., ESPN+		at FIU	W 97–94 ^{OT}	9–3 (1–0)	27 – Decker Jr.	9 – Smith	8 – Porter	Ocean Bank Convocation Center (399); Westchester, Florida
January 2, 2026; 7:00 p.m., ESPNU		Kennesaw State	W 81–73	10–3 (2–0)	20 – Cleveland	7 – Cleveland	4 – Metheny	Liberty Arena (3,415); Lynchburg, Virginia
January 4, 2026; 2:00 p.m., ESPN+		Jacksonville State	W 78–69	11–3 (3–0)	22 – Metheny	10 – Cleveland	7 – Cleveland	Liberty Arena (3,087); Lynchburg, Virginia
January 8, 2026; 7:00 p.m., CBS Sports Network		at Louisiana Tech	W 72–56	12–3 (4–0)	15 – Decker Jr.	8 – Smith	2 – Tied	Thomas Assembly Center (2,373); Ruston, Louisiana
January 10, 2026; 3:30 p.m., ESPN+		at Sam Houston	W 82–74	13–3 (5–0)	23 – Cleveland	7 – Cleveland	10 – Cleveland	Bernard Johnson Coliseum (1,170); Huntsville, Texas
January 15, 2026; 6:00 p.m., CBS Sports Network		New Mexico State	W 73–71	14–3 (6–0)	17 – Tied	6 – Cleveland	7 – Cleveland	Liberty Arena (2,580); Lynchburg, Virginia
January 17, 2026; 3:00 p.m., ESPN+		UTEP	W 80–69	15–3 (7–0)	20 – Tied	6 – Cleveland	4 – Cleveland	Liberty Arena (3,082); Lynchburg, Virginia
January 21, 2026; 7:30 p.m., ESPN+		at Western Kentucky	W 76–69	16–3 (8–0)	19 – Metheny	5 – Tied	6 – Metheny	E. A. Diddle Arena (3,512); Bowling Green, Kentucky
January 24, 2026; 1:00 p.m., ESPN+		Delaware	W 67–51	17–3 (9–0)	25 – Decker Jr.	8 – Cleveland	7 – Porter	Liberty Arena (3,475); Lynchburg, Virginia
January 29, 2026; 7:00 p.m., CBS Sports Network		at Middle Tennessee	W 81–65	18–3 (10–0)	29 – Metheny	6 – Cleveland	9 – Cleveland	Murphy Center (3,922); Murfreesboro, Tennessee
February 4, 2026; 7:00 p.m., ESPN+		at Delaware	W 75–69	19–3 (11–0)	23 – Porter	7 – Metheny	9 – Cleveland	Bob Carpenter Center (2,084); Newark, Delaware
February 7, 2026; 2:00 p.m., CBS Sports Network		Missouri State	W 79–76	20–3 (12–0)	20 – Decker Jr.	10 – Cleveland	11 – Cleveland	Liberty Arena (3,991); Lynchburg, Virginia
February 11, 2026; 9:00 p.m., ESPN+		at New Mexico State	W 77–75	21–3 (13–0)	19 – Harper	14 – Cleveland	5 – Porter	Pan American Center (5,236); Las Cruces, New Mexico
February 14, 2026; 2:00 p.m., ESPN2		at UTEP	W 73–64	22–3 (14–0)	18 – Harper	6 – Tied	7 – Metheny	Don Haskins Center (3,914); El Paso, Texas
February 19, 2026; 6:00 p.m., CBS Sports Network		FIU	W 90–89 ^{OT}	23–3 (15–0)	18 – Cleveland	7 – Smith	8 – Cleveland	Liberty Arena (3,553); Lynchburg, Virginia
February 21, 2026; 7:00 p.m., ESPN+		Western Kentucky	L 73–94	23–4 (15–1)	20 – Porter	4 – Cleveland	5 – Cleveland	Liberty Arena (3,922); Lynchburg, Virginia
February 26, 2026; 7:00 p.m., ESPN+		at Kennesaw State	L 65–74	23–5 (15–2)	15 – Decker Jr.	4 – Metheny	4 – Metheny	Convocation Center (2,046); Kennesaw, Georgia
February 28, 2026; 6:00 p.m., ESPNU		at Jacksonville State	W 81–78	24–5 (16–2)	24 – Metheny	7 – Cleveland	5 – Tied	Pete Mathews Coliseum (1,573); Jacksonville, Alabama
March 5, 2026; 7:00 p.m., ESPN+		Louisiana Tech	L 71–76	24–6 (16–3)	30 – Decker Jr.	6 – Metheny	8 – Cleveland	Liberty Arena (3,134); Lynchburg, Virginia
March 7, 2026; 2:00 p.m., ESPN+		Sam Houston	W 79–72	25–6 (17–3)	19 – Cleveland	9 – Cleveland	9 – Cleveland	Liberty Arena (3,523); Lynchburg, Virginia
Conference USA Tournament
March 11, 2026; 6:30 p.m., ESPN+	(1)	vs. (9) Missouri State; Quarterfinal	L 69-77	25–7	20 – Cleveland	14 – Cleveland	5 – Porter	Von Braun Center; Huntsville, Alabama
National Invitation Tournament
March 17, 2026; 6:00 p.m., ESPN2		at (3 AU) George Mason; First round	W 77–71	26–7	23 – Smith	9 – Smith	7 – Cleveland	EagleBank Arena (1,485); Fairfax, Virginia
March 21, 2026; 9:00 p.m., ESPN+		at (2 AU) Nevada; Second round	L 63–73	26–8	20 – Decker Jr.	7 – Cleveland	6 – Cleveland	Lawlor Events Center (4,616); Reno, Nevada
*Non-conference game. ^{#}Rankings from AP poll. (#) Tournament seedings in parentheses. AU=Auburn. All times are in Eastern.
