= Liberty Flames basketball =

Team that represents the men's basketball program at Liberty University

2026–27 Liberty Flames basketball team
- University: Liberty University
- Head coach: Ritchie McKay (12th, 14th overall season)
- Location: Lynchburg, Virginia
- Arena: Liberty Arena (capacity: 4,000)
- Conference: Conference USA
- Nickname: Flames
- Colors: Red, White, Navy Blue, and Light Blue
- Student section: LUnatics
- All-time record: 867–780 (.526)

NCAA Division I tournament round of 32
- 2019

NCAA Division I tournament appearances
- 1994, 2004, 2013, 2019, 2021, 2025

NIT appearances
- 2023, 2026
Other NIT results
Appearances	2023, 2026

Conference tournament champions
- Big South: 1994, 2004, 2013 ASUN: 2019, 2020, 2021 CUSA: 2025

Conference regular-season champions
- Big South: 2004 ASUN: 2019, 2020, 2021, 2022, 2023 CUSA: 2025, 2026

Conference division champions
- ASUN: 2022

Uniforms
Home	Away
Alternate	Alternate 2

The Liberty Flames men's basketball team is the men's basketball team that represents Liberty University. They play their home games at Liberty Arena and are members of the Conference USA, having moved there in July 2023 after 5 seasons in the ASUN. The Flames have appeared six times in the NCAA tournament, most recently in 2025.

== History ==
The Liberty men's basketball program began in 1972 under head coach Dan Manley. Liberty University is the second-youngest school in NCAA Division I, founded in 1971 (Florida Gulf Coast University was founded in 1991 with instruction starting in 1997). (Note: Two other Division I members were officially founded after Florida Gulf Coast, but both inherited their athletic programs from predecessor institutions that were Division I members.: The University of Texas Rio Grande Valley (UTRGV) was founded in 2013 by a merger of two other institutions in the University of Texas System and began operation in 2015. UTRGV inherited its athletic program from one of the predecessor institutions, the University of Texas–Pan American, which traced its history to a junior college that opened in 1927.; Purdue University Fort Wayne (PFW) was one of the two new institutions founded in 2018 when the Indiana University and Purdue University systems dissolved Indiana University – Purdue University Fort Wayne (IPFW), which had been founded in 1964. The former IPFW athletic program was entirely transferred to PFW.)

The Flames finished 13–14 in their inaugural season. As Liberty Baptist College, Liberty won the 1980 National Christian College Athletic Association (NCCAA) national championship against Point Loma College (68–65), surviving a double-overtime thriller 64–62 against The King's College (NY) Purple Knights in the Eastern Regional final, in front of a standing-room-only home crowd of 7,500 in Lynchburg.

Liberty has reached the post-season 12 times in its NCAA Division I history. The Flames fell to UNC (71–51) in the first round of the 1994 NCAA tournament after winning the Big South tournament. Liberty lost to St. Joseph's (82–63) in the 2004 NCAA tournament after crushing High Point (89–44) to claim its second Big South Conference Tournament Championship. Upon falling in the semi-finals of the Big South Conference tournament in the 2008–09 season, the Flames were invited to the inaugural CollegeInsider.com Tournament. Liberty defeated Rider in the first round before falling to James Madison in the quarterfinals.

As of the 2025–26 season, the Flames have had eight different head coaches of their Men's Basketball team (Dan Manley 1972–77, Harley Swift 1977–78, Dale Gibson 1978–81, Jeff Meyer 1981–97, Randy Dunton 1997–98 and 2003–2007, Mel Hankinson 1998–2003, Ritchie McKay 2007–09 and 2015–present, Dale Layer 2009–2015). As of the end of the 2025-26 season, the Flames have an overall record of 867–780 (52.6%).

== Coaches ==
=== Dan Manley (1972–1977) ===
In the 1972–73 season, Liberty University, known then as Lynchburg Baptist College (LBC), played its first game in the National Christian College Athletic Association (NCCAA) under head coach Dan Manley. The team practiced at the City Armory and Lynchburg Christian Academy, and games were held at the Jefferson Forest High School. LBC's first victory came against Southland College, winning 88–45. That season LBC finished with a record of 7–1. In the following season, 1973–74, LBC played its first varsity schedule, finishing its first official season with a record of 13–14.

Lynchburg Baptist College became Liberty Baptist College in 1975, changing its colors from green and gold to red, white and navy blue. That same year the Flames entered the National Association of Intercollegiate Athletics (NAIA), and Mike Goad became Liberty's first basketball All-American.

Dan Manley
5 Seasons
Record: 58–74

=== Harley Swift (1977–1978) ===
Harley "Skeeter" Swift was named Liberty's second men's basketball coach. Mark Chafin was the second Liberty player to be named NCCAA All-American.

Harley Swift
1 Season
Record: 7–22

=== Dale Gibson (1978–1981) ===
Dale Gibson became Liberty's third men's basketball coach in 1978. Mike Goad, an assistant for Gibson at the time, became the first player in Liberty's history to have his jersey (44) retired. On November 30, 1979, the Flames opened Liberty Gym against Mount Vernon Nazarene University with a 95–81 win. On December 8, 1979, the Flames traveled to Lexington, Virginia, to play VMI, their first NCAA Division I opponent, losing 106–58.

In 1980, Liberty joined the NCAA Division II level as an associate member. The Flames won the NCCAA National Championship and posted a 28–11 record. Karl Hess and Ed Vickers were named NCCAA All-Americans. Hess was also named a College Sports Information Directors of America (CoSIDA) Academic All-American.

Dale Gibson
3 Seasons
Record: 48–46

=== Jeff Meyer (1981–1997) ===
On March 25, 1981, Jeff Meyer was named Liberty's fourth men's basketball coach. Liberty Baptist became a full member of the NCAA Division II level and also became eligible for NAIA postseason competition. The Flames Sports Network began with Jerry Edwards handling the play-by-play. LBC moved into the new Liberty Gym. In 1982, Steve Isaacs became Liberty's first NAIA All-American. The next year Liberty is accepted as a member of the Eastern College Athletic Conference (ECAC). The Flames finished fifth in the NAIA National Championships with a 23–9 record. Steve Isaacs was named NAIA All-American for the second straight year. Liberty Baptist joined the Mason-Dixon Athletic Conference for the 1983–84 season.

In 1984, the Flames became eligible for NCAA Division II postseason competition. Ezra Hill became the first Liberty Baptist player drafted in the NBA. He was drafted in the 10th round by the Phoenix Suns. Liberty Baptist College became Liberty University in 1985. Cliff Webber was named a Division II All-American by Basketball Times. Webber was drafted in the fourth round by the Boston Celtics.

Liberty was accepted for NCAA Division I membership on September 1, 1988. Liberty defeated Brooklyn College (80–65) on November 26, 1988, for its first Division I victory. On Nov. 30, 1990, Liberty opened the Vines Convocation Center against VMI. VMI defeated the Flames, 69–61. On July 1, 1991, Liberty became an official member of the Big South Conference.

Liberty completed the 1991–92 season with a 16 1/2 game turnaround which tied the NCAA record for the best turnaround by a Division I school. The Flames finished with a 22–7 mark and concluded the regular season with a second-place finish in the Big South Conference. Liberty finished second in the country in field goal percentage (.520) and 11th in three-point field goal percentage (.421). Julius Nwosu was named first-team all-conference and Keith Ferguson was a second-team selection. Head coach Jeff Meyer earned Virginia Sports Information Directors Coach of the Year honors.

In 1993, the Flames posted their first win ever over in-state opponent Virginia Tech in Blacksburg, Virginia. Then, in 1994, Liberty claimed its first-ever Big South Conference tournament title, defeating Campbell, 76–62. The championship game was featured on ESPN with over 800 Liberty students making the trek to Charleston, South Carolina, for the game. Liberty qualified for the 1994 NCAA Tournament and faced defending national champion North Carolina. Liberty took the lead, 47–46, with under 10 minutes left; the Tar Heels ended with the win, 71–51, but the Flames proved to be a strong competitor in the biggest game in the history of the program.

Julius Nwosu was signed by the San Antonio Spurs in 1995, making him the first Flame basketball player to play on a National Basketball Association team. Matt Hildebrand became the second-ever Liberty player to have his jersey retired.

On March 1, 1997, Liberty played in the championship game of the Big South Conference Tournament for the second straight year and third time in the past four years. The Flames dropped a 64–54 decision to Charleston Southern. Peter Aluma finished his career as the school's and conference's leading shot blocker. He also was selected as the 1997 Big South tournament Most Valuable Player for the second time in his career and was named to the National Association of Basketball Coaches (NABC) all-district second-team.

Jeff Meyer
16 Seasons
Record: 259–206

=== Randy Dunton (1997–1998) ===
On Nov. 1, 1997, Jeff Meyer, head coach of the Flames basketball program for 16 years, stepped down to accept the position of assistant to the president of Liberty University. Randy Dunton was named interim head coach. Jan. 7, 1998, Liberty defeated UVA for the first time in the school's history, 69–64, in Charlottesville, Va. That also marked the first Atlantic Coast Conference opponent that the Flames had ever defeated.

Randy Dunton
6 Seasons
Record: 77–102

=== Mel Hankinson (1998–2002) ===
On April 8, 1998, Mel Hankinson was named the fifth head coach in the school's history, coming to Liberty after serving as the top assistant coach at West Virginia for the previous five years. Hankinson's first recruiting class was ranked between 20th and 43rd by four major recruiting publications, marking the best recruiting class by Liberty and in the Big South Conference.

Carl Williams finished the 1999–2000 season as the nation's leader in steals per game, averaging 3.8 takeaways per contest, becoming the first player in school history to lead the nation individually in a statistical category.

Mel Hankinson
4 Seasons
Record: 36–77

=== Randy Dunton (2003–2007) ===
On March 6, 2002, Randy Dunton was named the sixth head coach in the school's history. He returned to the Liberty campus after serving two years as the head coach at Marshalltown Community College and as an assistant coach at Binghamton University.

On March 6, 2004, Liberty claimed its second-ever Big South Championship with an 89–44 victory over High Point in the championship game in front of 8,515 fans in the Vines Center. The win marked the largest margin of victory in the history of the Big South Championship. Liberty made its second-ever appearance in an NCAA Tournament game as the 16th-seeded Flames squared off against top-seeded St. Joseph's at the HSBC Arena in Buffalo, NY. The Flames dropped an 82–63 decision to the eventual Elite Eight team.

Liberty traveled to play the Kentucky Wildcats on Nov. 25, 2005. There were 22,717 fans crammed into the famous Rupp Arena, serving as the largest crowd to ever see a Liberty game, as Kentucky defeated the Flames by a score of 81–51. Following the 2005–2006 season, Larry Blair earned VaSID all-state basketball first team honors, becoming just the second Flames player to earn first-team honors, joining Peter Aluma who was named to the first team in 1996 and 1997. Blair also joined Aluma as the only Flames to have earned VaSID honors twice.

Liberty honored all-time leading scorer Karl Hess by retiring his jersey prior to the Flames’ 64–56 victory over Conference USA foe East Carolina on Dec. 2, 2006.

One week later, Larry Blair scored 18 points against Longwood University to pass Peter Aluma (1,715 points), becoming Liberty's all-time leading Division I scorer. On Jan. 30, 2007, With 15 points against visiting UNC Asheville, Larry Blair became the third player in Liberty and Big South Conference history to reach the 2,000-point plateau. Feb. 21, 2007, Larry Blair scored 28 points in Liberty's 118–108 victory at VMI to pass Tony Dunkin of Coastal Carolina, becoming the Big South Conference's all-time leading scorer. Blair's second field goal of the evening, at the 11:19 mark in the first half, broke the record when the senior guard dunked home two points on a fast break.

After the 2006–2007 season, Larry Blair was named to the Big South all-conference first team for the third consecutive year, making him the fourth player in school history to earn all-conference honors four times. Blair earned second team honors as a freshman as well as being named Big South Freshman of the Year.

Randy Dunton
6 Seasons
Record: 77–102

=== Ritchie McKay (2007–2009, 1st stint) ===
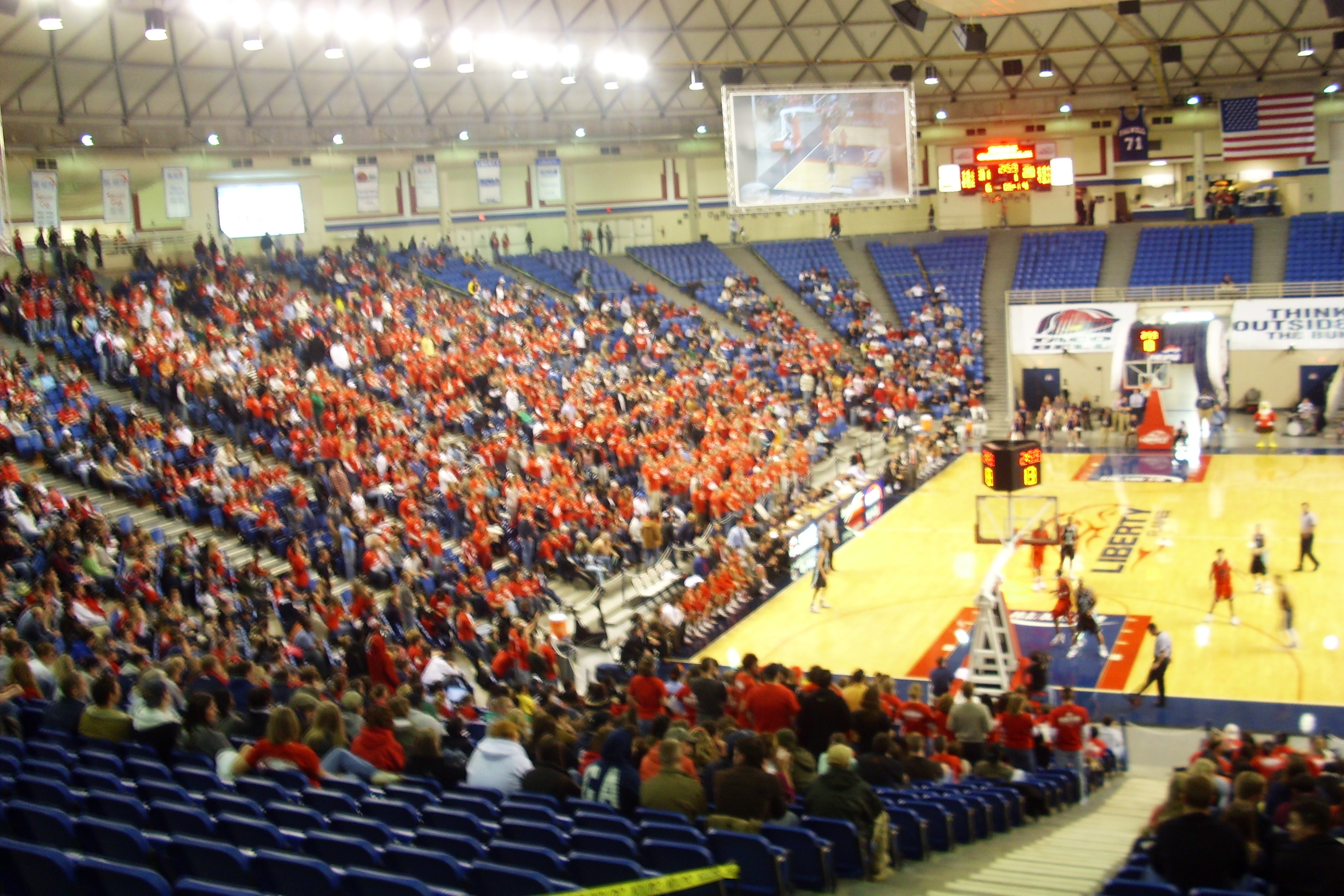
A Liberty game in 2008

On March 26, 2007, Ritchie McKay was named the seventh head coach in school history. After the 2007–2008 season, *Alex McLean (basketball coach) was named to the Big South All-Conference first team, marking the sixth-straight year Liberty has placed a player on the first team, tying the second-best streak in conference history. Jeremy Anderson was named to the all-freshman squad, while Kyle Ohman received all-academic honors.

Peter Aluma became the first Liberty men's basketball player enshrined in the Big South Conference's Hall of Fame on May 29, 2008. On April 1, 2009, McKay was hired by the University of Virginia to be the head assistant coach of men's basketball to his friend and mentor Tony Bennett.

Ritchie McKay
2 Seasons (2007–2009, 1st stint)
Record: 39–28

=== Dale Layer (2009–2015) ===
After the 2008–2009 season, Liberty University Director of Athletics Jeff Barber announced that Dale Layer has been named the program's eighth head men's basketball coach. Layer returns to Liberty Mountain after previously serving as an assistant coach for the Flames during the 2007–08 season. Layer led the 2012–13 team to a Big South championship and NCAA berth with a 15–20 record, 6–10 in the conference. Layer was fired after the 2014–2015 season after Liberty finished just 8–24 on the season.

Dale Layer
4 Seasons
Record: 47–53

=== Ritchie McKay (2015–present, 2nd stint) ===
On April 1, 2015, McKay was rehired as the Liberty basketball head coach after spending time at the University of Virginia as the head assistant coach of men's basketball to his friend and mentor Tony Bennett.

McKay's second stint has been highlighted by the Flames' 2018 move to the ASUN Conference, followed by conference tournament championships in their first three ASUN seasons (2019–2021), their first NCAA tournament win (2019), and the 2020 opening of the program's current primary home of Liberty Arena.

9 Seasons (2015–Present, 2nd stint)
Record: 205–99

Overall Record: 244–127 (11 seasons)

== Notable players ==
=== Matt Hildebrand #20 ===
One of the top players to ever wear a Liberty uniform, Matt Hildebrand excelled on and off on the court during his four-year career. He helped lead the Flames to their first-ever Big South Conference championship and NCAA Tournament appearance in 1994.

Because of his achievements over his four-year career at Liberty, Hildebrand was brought back on December 3, 1994, to have his jersey retired in front of the home fans in the Vines Center. Hildebrand, an all-conference performer, started every game during his career at Liberty and holds numerous school and conference records. The 1994 Big South Conference Male Athlete of the Year, he was ranked fourth in the nation in free throw percentage during his sophomore and senior years.

He scored over 1,500 points, 385 rebounds and dished out 583 assists, while shooting 45 percent from the floor. He also hit a school-record 207 three-pointers. Hildebrand still holds the Big South Conference record for free throw percentage (.904). Hildebrand was also the recipient of the 1993–94 Rock Royer/Mack Rivera award which goes to the most accomplished Liberty student athlete of the year.

=== Julius Nwosu #00 ===
Julius Nwosu was the first big man to excel at Liberty, since the school became an NCAA Division I member in 1988. He was the first Flame to play in the NBA with the San Antonio Spurs in 1995. Nwosu also helped lead the Flames into their first year as a member of the Big South Conference and to their first 20-win season (23–7, 1992) in nine years and first at the NCAA Division I level.

In front of the home fans at the Vines Center, Nwosu had his jersey retired. He earned all-Big South Conference honors as a junior and senior and ranked among the conference's scoring, rebounding and blocked shot leaders both seasons. Nwosu also finished second in the conference in field goal percentage as a senior (.615). He led the conference in blocked shots (1.8) as a junior and was selected as the conference's player of the week on three occasions during his career.

He led the squad in scoring (18.1), rebounding (8.5), block shots (1.6) and field goal percentage (.615) as a senior. Nwosu also led the team in scoring (13.7) and block shots (1.8) as a junior.

=== Peter Aluma #00 ===
Peter Aluma was one of the top centers in Liberty and Big South Conference history. He was an excellent scorer and prolific shot blocker during his career with the Flames, helping them to three conference championship games and one Big South Championship title in 1994.

Aluma had his jersey retired on November 15, 1997, in front of a home crowd. Aluma finished his Big South Conference career as the top shot blocker (366), third in games played (119), second in free throws made (451) and third in scoring (1,715). He also holds the number two, three and four positions on the single-season blocked shot list. Aluma finished 13th in blocked shots and 18th in blocked shot average among career national leaders.

He was selected to the Big South Conference's all-rookie team as a freshman and then was an all-conference performer for three years. He was selected to the all-tournament team three times, being selected most outstanding player twice. Aluma was a two-time selection to the VaSID all-state team and the Richmond Times Dispatch.

Aluma, a three-year starter during his career at Liberty holds several school records. He set the record for blocked shots in a game, season and career and finished second in free throws made and fifth in school's history for scoring. He owns the single-season record for blocks (113) and holds the number two through four marks also. He still holds the Big South Conference career blocks record (366).

Aluma finished first on the school's NCAA Division I scoring list, free throws made list, second in offensive and defensive rebounds, second in minutes played and third in steals. He scored double digits 87 times, scored 20 or more points 36 times and had 13 double-doubles to his credit.

=== Karl Hess #11 ===
The most prolific scorer in Liberty basketball history, Karl Hess, did so without the luxury of a three-point line, racking up a program-best 2,373 points. He was the team captain of Liberty's 1980 NCCAA National Championship team as a senior, earning All-Tournament and MVP honors.

Liberty retired his jersey on Dec. 2, 2006. Hess finds himself atop many school record lists, including first in field goals (951) and second in field goals attempted (1,798). Hess ranks first in free throws (471), free throw percentage (89.9%), assists (648), and is tied for second in games played (120).

Hess, a four-year starter, has a list of personal achievements that include winning Liberty's Rock Royer-Mac Rivera Award (1980), NCCAA First Team All-American (1980) and CoSIDA Academic First Team All-American (1980) college division.

A 5–11 guard from Shickshinney, Pa., Hess currently is a psychologist and resides in Lynchburg with his wife, April, and their two sons, Nate and Zack. Hess also travels extensively as a major college basketball referee, primarily officiating SEC, ACC and BIG EAST games.

Hess served as the crew chief for the 2007 NCAA Men's National Championship game between Florida and Ohio State. The honor entailed tossing the jump ball between 2007 NBA first round draft picks, Joakim Noah (Florida) and Greg Oden (Ohio State).

=== Larry Blair #22 ===
Larry Blair played 4 seasons with Liberty 2003–2007. During his career, Blair received Big South Conference all-conference honors all 4 season. In 2003, he was the Big South rookie of the year and was on the all-freshman team. Blair was on the all-tournament team in 2004 when he led the Flames to their second ever Big South tournament championship and NCAA tournament appearance.

Blair holds Liberty's NCAA Division I record for most points in a career (2,211), which was the most in Big South Conference, but was passed the next year by VMI's Reggie Williams (2,556). He is one of only three players who have scored more than 2,000 points for the Flames. Blair currently plays in Finland for team Joensuun Kataja.

=== Anthony Smith #5 ===
Anthony Smith a four-year starter with liberty from 2004–2008. Smith, was a fall 2008 collegeInsider.com Mid-Major All-American honorable mention where he averaged 17.6 points and pulled down a career best 6.5 rebounds a game. Smith concluded his prominent Liberty career ranked No. 9 all-time in the Big South Conference in scoring, while finishing No. 6 in the Liberty annals. Smith's 1754 career points rank second only to Larry Blair (2,211) in Liberty's Division I era. Smith, was the 2008–09 Big South Player of the year and secured first-team honors on the Big South all-conference and NABC all-district teams. As a junior, Smith was the only player in the nation during the 2008 season to attempt at least 200 three-point field goals and succeed on at least 40 percent of his three-point field goal attempts (41.0), while also hitting over 50 percent of his field goal attempts (51.5). Only four other layers in the nation accomplish the same feat while attempting at least 100 three-point field goals, including Mario Charmers (Kansas), Lee Cummard (BYU), Malik Hairston (Oregon) and James Harden (Arizona State). Smith played on the 2009 summer league team of the Indiana Pacers. He has played professionally in Spain and Germany. He is currently playing in France (Poitiers).

=== Seth Curry #30 ===
Seth Curry is a native of Charlotte, North Carolina. He is the son of former Virginia Tech and NBA star Dell Curry. His older brother, Stephen Curry, is a point guard for the Golden State Warriors.

Curry set many freshman records at Liberty, including freshman scoring (707), fifth in Big South history for one season, crushing Larry Blair's previous record (427). Curry also led all freshmen in the nation in scoring. Curry was named the Big South Conference Freshman of the year. Curry also holds the Big South record for minutes played in one season (1,277), seven more than fellow Flame, Anthony Smith (1,270).

Curry was named 2008–09 Big South Freshman of the Year, Basketball Times All-Freshmen Team, Collegeinsider.com Mid-Major All-American, Collegehoops.net Mid-Major All-American, Collegehoops.net All-Freshmen Team, Collegehoops.net Mid-Major All-Freshmen Team, Collegehoops.net Freshman of the Year, NABC All-District 2nd Team, 2-time Dick Vitale's "Diaper Dandy of the Week," Richmond Times-Dispatch All-State, VaSID 1st-Team All-State, VaSID Rookie of the Year,

After the 2008–2009 season, Curry decided to transfer to Duke University.

=== Jesse Sanders #25 ===
The Sugar Land, Texas native played all but 5 games in his 4-year career with the Liberty Flames. Jesse Sanders became the first player in Division I history to record a triple-double in each of his four collegiate seasons. During his senior season, Sanders average 8 assists per game which was the third best average in the country. In addition, his 2.9 assist to turnover ratio placed him 9th in the country.

Sanders was named the Big South Conference Player of the Year during his Junior campaign as well as received First Team All-Big South honors, Associated Press All-America honorable mention and earned Mid-Major All-America honorable mention from Collegehoops.net. He was named to the Big South All-Freshman Team after the 08–09 season.

- Andrew Smith (born 1992), American-Latvian basketball player in the Israeli Basketball Premier League

=== Darius McGhee #2 ===
As a freshman at Liberty, McGhee averaged 7.8 points per game. He averaged 9.5 points and four rebounds per game as a sophomore. On February 27, 2021, McGhee scored a season-high 34 points in a 94–78 win over Bellarmine, matching the program record of eight three-pointers, to claim the ASUN regular season title. He was named ASUN Player of the Year and was a unanimous First Team All-ASUN selection. On March 7, McGhee posted 21 points and eight rebounds in a 79–75 victory over North Alabama at the ASUN tournament final. He was named tournament MVP. As a junior, McGhee averaged 15.5 points, 2.1 assists and 4.4 rebounds per game. On January 15, 2022, he scored a school-record 48 points, including 37 in the second half, in a 78–75 win against Florida Gulf Coast. On February 26, McGhee scored 47 points in a 100–93 overtime win against Kennesaw State. At the close of the 2021–22 season, McGhee was again named ASUN Player of the Year. His 142 three pointers in 2021 is 12th most ever in a single season for Division I basketball.

on November 26, 2022, McGhee passed the 2,000-point milestone for his career. Then, on February 4, 2023, he became the Flames' all-time leading scorer, surpassing Karl Hess, who had played for the Flames from 1976 to 1980 when Liberty was an NAIA member. On February 22, he became the ASUN's all-time scoring leader, surpassing Willie Jackson, who played for Centenary from 1980 to 1984 when the ASUN was known as the Trans America Athletic Conference. In the same game, he also became the fourth Division I men's player to score 500 three-pointers in his career. On February 27, 2023, McGhee was named the ASUN Player of the Year for the third consecutive season, joining Centenary's Jackson as the only players in league history to earn the award that many times. He was also named to a third consecutive all-conference first team selection. He ended the season with 162 three-pointers, tying Stephen Curry's NCAA single-season record set in 2008.

After going undrafted in the 2023 NBA draft, McGhee joined the Indiana Pacers for the 2023 NBA Summer League and on October 17, 2023, he signed with them. However, he was waived the next day. On October 28, 2023, he joined the Indiana Mad Ants of the NBA G League

On June 10, 2024, McGhee signed with Telekom Baskets Bonn of the German Basketball Bundesliga (BBL). Over the BBL season, McGhee led Bonn in scoring (15.5 PPG) and assists (4.2 APG), though his team missed the playoffs.

On June 14, 2025, he signed with JL Bourg of the LNB Pro A.

=== Taelon Peter #2 ===
In one season with the Flames, Taelon Peter averaged 13.7 points and four rebounds, being selected third-team All-Conference USA and the Conference USA Sixth Man of the Year. He led the conference in free throw percentage and also was the national leader with a true shooting percentage of .724, "a statistic that combines field goal and free throw shooting proficiency". Peter was selected by the Indiana Pacers in the second round (54th overall) of the 2025 NBA draft.

== Postseason ==
=== NCAA tournament appearances ===
The Flames have appeared in the NCAA tournament six times. Their combined record is 1–6.

Year	Seed	Round	Opponent	Result
1994	16	First Round	(1) North Carolina	L 51–71
2004	16	First Round	(1) St. Joseph's	L 63–82
2013	16	First Four	(16) North Carolina A&T	L 72–73
2019	12	First Round; Second Round	(5) Mississippi State (4) Virginia Tech	W 80–76; L 58–67
2021	13	First Round	(4) Oklahoma State	L 60–69
2025	12	First Round	(5) Oregon	L 52–81

=== NIT appearances ===
The Flames have appeared in the National Invitation Tournament two times. Their combined record is 2–2.

Year	Seed	Round	Opponent	Result
2023	3	First Round; Second Round	Villanova (2) Wisconsin	W 62–57; L 71-75
2026	N/A	First Round; Second Round	(3) George Mason (2) Nevada	W 77-71; L 63-73

=== CIT appearances ===
The Flames have appeared in the CollegeInsider.com Postseason Tournament (CIT) three times. Their combined record is 5–3.

Year	Round	Opponent	Result
2009	First Round; Quarterfinals	Rider; James Madison	W 69–58; L 65–88
2017	First Round; Second Round; Quarterfinals	Norfolk State; Samford; UMBC	W 73–64; W 66–58; L 68–80
2018	First Round; Quarterfinals; Semifinals	North Carolina A&T; Central Michigan; UIC	W 65–52; W 84–71; L 51–67

=== NAIA appearances ===
The Flames appeared in the NAIA tournament one time. Their record is 2–1.

Year	Round	Opponent	Result
1983	First Round; Second Round; Quarterfinals	Catawba; Wisconsin–Stevens Point; Chaminade	W 77–67; W 64–62; L 65–88

== List of Liberty Flames seasons ==
Season	Conference	Head Coach	Total Wins	Total Losses	Conference Wins	Conference Losses	Conference Standing	Conference Tournament	In-Season Tournament	Postseason
1972–73	NCCAA	Dan Manley	13	14	—	—	—	—	—	NCCAA District II Tournament
1973–74	NCCAA	Dan Manley	11	12	—	—	—	—	—	NCCAA District II Tournament
1974–75	NCCAA	Dan Manley	17	11	—	—	—	—	—	NCCAA District II Tournament
1975–76	NAIA	Dan Manley	12	15	—	—	—	—	—	NCCAA District II Tournament
1976–77	NAIA	Dan Manley	5	22	—	—	—	—	—	—
1977–78	NAIA	Harley 'Skeeter' Swift	7	22	—	—	—	—	—	NCCAA District II Tournament
1978–79	NAIA	Dale Gibson	15	16	—	—	—	—	—	NCCAA District II Tournament
1979–80	NAIA	Dale Gibson	28	11	—	—	—	—	—	NCCAA National Champions
1980–81	NCAA Division II independent	Dale Gibson	5	19	—	—	—	—	—	—
1981–82	NCAA Division II independent	Jeff Meyer	15	11	—	—	—	—	—	NAIA District 19 Tournament
1982–83	NCAA Division II independent	Jeff Meyer	23	9	—	—	—	—	—	NAIA National Tournament
1983–84	Mason-Dixon Conference	Jeff Meyer	19	10	—	—	—	—	—	—
1984–85	Mason-Dixon Conference	Jeff Meyer	19	10	—	—	—	—	—	—
1985–86	Mason-Dixon Conference	Jeff Meyer	18	13	—	—	—	—	—	—
1986–87	Mason-Dixon Conference	Jeff Meyer	18	11	—	—	—	—	—	—
1987–88	Mason-Dixon Conference	Jeff Meyer	13	15	—	—	—	—	—	—
1988–89	NCAA Division I independent	Jeff Meyer	10	17	—	—	—	—	—	—
1989–90	NCAA Division I independent	Jeff Meyer	11	17	—	—	—	—	—	—
1990–91	NCAA Division I independent	Jeff Meyer	5	23	—	—	—	—	—	—
1991–92	Big South	Jeff Meyer	22	7	10	4	Second	Semifinals	—	—
1992–93	Big South	Jeff Meyer	16	14	9	7	Fourth	Quarterfinals	—	—
1993–94	Big South	Jeff Meyer	18	12	12	6	Fourth	Champions	—	NCAA Tournament First Round
1994–95	Big South	Jeff Meyer	12	16	7	9	Fifth	Semifinals	—	—
1995–96	Big South	Jeff Meyer	17	12	11	6	Second	Finals	—	—
1996–97	Big South	Jeff Meyer	23	9	11	3	Tied-First	Finals	—	—
1997–98	Big South	Randy Dunton	11	17	5	7	Fourth	Semifinals	—	—
1998–99	Big South	Mel Hankinson	4	23	0	10	Sixth	Quarterfinals	—	—
1999–00	Big South	Mel Hankinson	14	14	4	10	Seventh	Quarterfinals	—	—
2000–01	Big South	Mel Hankinson	13	15	5	9	Sixth	Semifinals	—	—
2001–02	Big South	Mel Hankinson	5	25	2	12	Eighth	Quarterfinals	—	—
2002–03	Big South	Randy Dunton	14	15	8	6	Second	Semifinals	—	—
2003–04	Big South	Randy Dunton	18	15	12	4	Tied-First	Champions	—	NCAA Tournament First Round
2004–05	Big South	Randy Dunton	13	15	11	5	Second	Quarterfinals	—	—
2005–06	Big South	Randy Dunton	7	23	3	13	Seventh	Quarterfinals	—	—
2006–07	Big South	Randy Dunton	14	17	8	6	Third	Quarterfinals	—	—
2007–08	Big South	Ritchie McKay	16	16	7	7	Fourth	Semifinals	—	—
2008–09	Big South	Ritchie McKay	23	12	12	6	Third	Semifinals	—	CIT Quarterfinals
2009–10	Big South	Dale Layer	15	16	10	8	Sixth	Quarterfinals	—	—
2010–11	Big South	Dale Layer	19	13	13	5	Second	Quarterfinals	—	—
2011–12	Big South	Dale Layer	14	18	9	9	Fifth	Quarterfinals	—	—
2012–13	Big South	Dale Layer	15	21	6	10	Ninth	Champions	—	NCAA Tournament First Four
2013–14	Big South	Dale Layer	11	21	5	11	Tenth	First Round	—	—
2014–15	Big South	Dale Layer	8	24	2	16	Eleventh	First Round	—	—
2015–16	Big South	Ritchie McKay	13	19	10	8	Tied-Fifth	First Round	—	—
2016–17	Big South	Ritchie McKay	21	14	14	4	Third	Quarterfinals	Coach John McLendon Classic Champions	CIT Quarterfinals
2017–18	Big South	Ritchie McKay	25	15	9	9	Fifth	Runner-Up	Jim Phelan Classic Champions	CIT Semifinals
2018–19	ASUN	Ritchie McKay	28	6	14	2	First	Champions	—	NCAA Tournament Second Round
2019–20	ASUN	Ritchie McKay	30	4	13	3	First	Champions	The Islands of the Bahamas Showcase Champions, D.C. Holiday Hoops Classic Champions	NCAA Tournament (tournament canceled)
2020–21	ASUN	Ritchie McKay	23	6	11	2	First	Champions	—	NCAA Tournament First Round
2021–22	ASUN	Ritchie McKay	22	11	12	4	First (East)	Semifinals	—	—
2022–23	ASUN	Ritchie McKay	27	9	15	3	Second	Runner-Ups	—	NIT Tournament Second Round
2023–24	Conference USA	Ritchie McKay	18	14	7	9	Fourth	—	Myrtle Beach Invitational Champions	—
2024–25	Conference USA	Richie McKay	28	6	13	5	First	Champions	Paradise Jam Champions	NCAA Tournament First Round
2025–26	Conference USA	Richie McKay	26	8	17	3	First	Quarterfinals	ESPN Events Invitational Quarterfinals	NIT Tournament Second Round
Totals: 54 Seasons	4 Conferences	8 Head Coaches	Total Wins 867	Total Losses 780	Conf. Wins 317	Conf. Losses 241	Regular seasons Champions 8 times	Conf. Tournament Champions 7 times	In-Season Tournament Champions 6 times	National Champions 1 time
