= Dale Gibson =

American basketball coach

Current position
- Title: Former Head coach
- Team: Liberty

Coaching career (HC unless noted)
- 1971–1972: Lynchburg Christian Academy
- 1972–1978: Liberty (asst.)
- 1978–1981: Liberty

Administrative career (AD unless noted)
- 1972–1976: Lynchburg Christian Academy
- 1977–1980: Liberty

Head coaching record
- Overall: 48-46 (.511)

Accomplishments and honors

Championships
- 1980 NCCAA National Championship

Dale Gibson is a former men's basketball coach at Liberty University (then called Lynchburg Baptist College). After leaving coaching, he served as a professor at Liberty where he started the school's Sport Management program. Currently he teaches at Tusculum College.

Gibson graduated from Lord Botetourt High School in Daleville, Virginia in 1966. He played basketball and soccer at Appalachian Bible College and Bryan College. After graduating, he spent one season as the head basketball coach at the Lynchburg Christian Academy. He then served as the first assistant basketball coach at Liberty University beginning with the program's launch in 1972. He became a full time faculty member in 1976 and was named the school's athletic director in 1977. In 1978, he was named the school's third ever head men's basketball coach. In his second season, he led the Flames to a national championship in the National Christian College Athletic Association.

== Head coaching record ==
Record table
Season	Team	Overall	
Liberty Flames (NCCAA) (1978–1981)
1978–1979	Liberty	15-16	
1979–1980	Liberty	28-11	NCCAA National Champions
1980–1981	Liberty	5-19	
Liberty:		48-46	
Total:		48-46	
National champion Postseason invitational champion Conference regular season champion Conference regular season and conference tournament champion Division regular season champion Division regular season and conference tournament champion Conference tournament champion
