= Dale Layer =

American basketball coach (born 1958)

Current position
- Title: Special Assistant to the Head Coach
- Team: Texas A&M
- Conference: SEC

Biographical details
- Born: May 16, 1958 (age 68); Gainesville, Florida, U.S.

Playing career
- 1976–1980: Eckerd

Coaching career (HC unless noted)
- 1980–1982: Eckerd (assistant)
- 1982–1983: Eastern Kentucky (assistant)
- 1983–1988: Eckerd (assistant)
- 1989–1998: Queens (NC)
- 1998–2000: Colorado State (assistant)
- 2000–2007: Colorado State
- 2007–2008: Liberty (assistant)
- 2008–2009: Marquette (assistant)
- 2009–2015: Liberty
- 2016–2017: Greensboro Swarm (assistant)
- 2017–2018: Mercer (asst.)
- 2018–2019: Virginia Tech (special asst.)
- 2019–present: Texas A&M (special asst.)

Head coaching record
- Overall: 352–306
- Tournaments: 0–2 (NCAA Division I); 1–2 (NCAA Division II)

Accomplishments and honors

Championships
- Big South tournament (2013); Mountain West tournament (2003)

Awards
- Big South Coach of the Year (2011)

Dale Layer (born May 16, 1958) is an American basketball coach, currently a special assistant to the head coach at Texas A&M in College Station, Texas. Previously he served as an assistant coach for the Greensboro Swarm of the NBA Development League. He was previously the head coach of the Liberty Flames men's basketball team. He was fired by the university on March 5, 2015, after finishing the season with only a 2–16 conference record and an 8–24 overall record. It marks his second stint as a coach at Liberty; he spent the 2007–2008 campaign as an assistant to Ritchie McKay.

== Biography ==
=== Eckerd College ===
Layer started his coaching career in 1980 after graduating from his alma mater Eckerd College with a bachelors degree in psychology. He spent seven of the next eight years at Eckerd, and was an assistant at Eastern Kentucky University during the 1982–1983 season.

=== Queens University of Charlotte ===
He then made the jump to the head coaching ranks, accepting a job at Queens University of Charlotte. He amassed 167 wins against 87 losses in nine years as the head coach, and also served as the school's athletic director.

=== Colorado State University ===
In 1998, Layer accepted a job at Colorado State as an assistant after Ritchie McKay accepted the head coaching position. Layer helped lead the Rams to an NIT appearance in 1999, defeating Mississippi State and Colorado before losing to the eventual champion, California.

Layer was hired as head coach at CSU on April 11, 2000, after McKay left. Layer guided the team to its first NCAA Tournament bid in 13 years, in 2003. He was twice voted the region's coach of the year by the National Basketball Coaches Association. He was fired in 2007 although he had a year left on his contract. He finished with a 103–106 record (and 31–71 in conference play).

=== Liberty University ===
He rejoined McKay's staff shortly after McKay accepted the job at Liberty University. Layer stayed for a year before heading off to be an assistant to head coach Buzz Williams at Marquette.

After the 2008–2009 season, McKay left Liberty and accepted a job as associate head coach at the University of Virginia. Liberty contacted Layer about filling the head coaching vacancy, and Layer accepted. Layer led the 2012–13 team to a surprise Big South championship and an NCAA bid with a 15–20 record. He was fired in 2015, finishing with 82-113 record.

=== Greensboro Swarm ===
On September 26, 2016, Layer was appointed an assistant coach of the Greensboro Swarm, a new NBA Development League franchise. On June 13, 2017, Layer joined Mercer University as an assistant coach.

== Personal life ==
Layer is married to Brenda Peterson, they have three children.

== Head coaching record ==
Record table
Season	Team	Overall	Conference	Standing	Postseason
Queens Royals (Conference Carolinas) (1989–1998)
1989–90	Queens	11–17			
1990–91	Queens	20–8			
1991–92	Queens	14–13			
1992–93	Queens	20–8			
1993–94	Queens	14–12			
1994–95	Queens	17–10			
1995–96	Queens	25–6			NCAA Division II Sweet 16
1996–97	Queens	22–7			
1997–98	Queens	24–6			NCAA Division II First Round
Queens:		167–87			
Colorado State Rams (Mountain West Conference) (2000–2007)
2000–01	Colorado State	15–13	6–8	T–4th	
2001–02	Colorado State	12–18	3–11	T–7th	
2002–03	Colorado State	19–14	5–9	6th	NCAA Division I First Round
2003–04	Colorado State	13–15	4–10	T–7th	
2004–05	Colorado State	11–17	3–11	T–7th	
2005–06	Colorado State	16–15	4–10	8th	
2006–07	Colorado State	17–13	6–10	T–6th	
Colorado State:		103–106	35–69		
Liberty Flames (Big South Conference) (2009–2015)
2009–10	Liberty	15–16	10–8	6th	
2010–11	Liberty	19–13	13–5	2nd	
2011–12	Liberty	14–18	9–9	5th	
2012–13	Liberty	15–21	6–10	5th (North)	NCAA Division I First Four
2013–14	Liberty	11–21	5–11	5th (North)	
2014–15	Liberty	8–24	2–16	11th	
Liberty:		82–113	45–59		
Total:		352–306			
National champion Postseason invitational champion Conference regular season champion Conference regular season and conference tournament champion Division regular season champion Division regular season and conference tournament champion Conference tournament champion
