= Randy Dunton =

Biographical details
- Born: December 22, 1960 (age 65)

Playing career
- 1980-1984: Baptist Bible College

Coaching career (HC unless noted)
- 1984-1988: Anchorage Christian HS
- 1988-1989: West Anchorage HS
- 1989–1997: Liberty (asst.)
- 1997–1998: Liberty
- 1998–2000: Marshalltown CC
- 2000–2002: Binghamton (asst.)
- 2002–2007: Liberty

Head coaching record
- Overall: 111-128

Accomplishments and honors

Championships
- 1985 Alaska AAA State Champion; 1986 Alaska AAA State Champion; 2004 Big South Regular Season Co-Champions; 2004 Big South Tournament Champion

Awards
- 1985 Alaska HS Coach of Year; 1989 Alaska HS Coach of Year

Randy Dunton (born December 22, 1960) is a former head men's basketball coach at Liberty University. He had been the assistant under head coach Jeff Meyer, who was subsequently let go in 1997. Dunton was named the interim head coach for 1997–1998, a season that saw the Liberty Flames defeat in-state rival Virginia. However, he was not offered a contract at the end of the season, and Mel Hankinson became the head coach.

Dunton later coached at Binghamton University as an assistant. He was finally offered the head coaching position at Liberty University after the school suffered through four disappointing seasons under Hankinson. Dunton brought in some junior college players and helped lead the team to a second-place finish in his first year back, and then Liberty won the Big South Conference championship and an NCAA Tournament berth in 2004.

However, his team slipped in subsequent years and did not have a winning record from 2004–05 to 2006–07. Dunton's contract was not renewed at the end of the 2006–07 season.

Dunton coached a U17 girls' basketball team in Brookville, Virginia, a team which included his daughter. In January 2012, Randy became the women's basketball head at Virginia University of Lynchburg.

== Head coaching record ==
Record table
Season	Team	Overall			
Liberty Flames (Big South Conference) (1997–1998)
1997–1998	Liberty	11–17	5–7	4th	
Marshalltown Tigers (NJCAA Division I) (1998–2000)
1998–1999	Marshalltown	13–17			
1999–2000	Marshalltown	21–9			
Marshalltown:		34–26			
Liberty Flames (Big South Conference) (2002–2007)
2002–2003	Liberty	14–15	8–6	2nd	
2003–2004	Liberty	18–15	12–4	T-1st	NCAA 1st Round
2004–2005	Liberty	13–15	11–5	2nd	
2005–2006	Liberty	7–23	3–13	8th	
2006–2007	Liberty	14–17	8–6	3rd	
Liberty:		77–102			
Total:		111–128			
National champion Postseason invitational champion Conference regular season champion Conference regular season and conference tournament champion Division regular season champion Division regular season and conference tournament champion Conference tournament champion
