= Skeeter Swift =

American basketball player (1946–2017)

Personal information
- Born: June 19, 1946 Alexandria, Virginia, U.S.
- Died: April 20, 2017 (aged 70) Kingsport, Tennessee, U.S.
- Listed height: 6 ft 3 in (1.91 m)
- Listed weight: 204 lb (93 kg)

Career information
- High school: George Washington (Alexandria, Virginia)
- College: East Tennessee State (1966–1969)
- NBA draft: 1969: 3rd round, 31st overall pick
- Drafted by: Milwaukee Bucks
- Playing career: 1969–1974
- Position: Shooting guard
- Number: 24, 23, 21

Career history

Playing
- 1969–1970: New Orleans Buccaneers
- 1969–1970: Memphis Pros
- 1970–1972: Pittsburgh Condors
- 1972–1974: Dallas Chaparrals / San Antonio Spurs

Coaching
- 1977–1978: Liberty

Career highlights
- 3× All-OVC (1967–1969); 1967-68 OVC Player of the Year; No. 54 retired by East Tennessee State Buccaneers; Inducted in the Tennessee Sports Hall of Fame
- Stats at Basketball Reference

Harley Edward "Skeeter" Swift Jr. (June 19, 1946 – April 20, 2017) was an American professional basketball player.

A 6'3" guard from East Tennessee State University, Swift was selected in the third round (31st pick overall) of the 1969 NBA draft by the Milwaukee Bucks, but he instead played five seasons in the American Basketball Association as a member of the New Orleans Buccaneers, Memphis Pros, Pittsburgh Condors, Dallas Chaparrals, and San Antonio Spurs. He averaged 11.6 points per game in his professional career.

Swift died on April 20, 2017, at the age of 70.

== Career statistics ==
Legend
GP	Games played	GS	Games started	MPG	Minutes per game
FG%	Field goal percentage	3P%	3-point field goal percentage	FT%	Free throw percentage
RPG	Rebounds per game	APG	Assists per game	SPG	Steals per game
BPG	Blocks per game	PPG	Points per game	**Bold**	Career high

=== ABA ===
==== Regular season ====
Year	Team	GP	MPG	FG%	3P%	FT%	RPG	APG	SPG	BPG	PPG
1969–70	New Orleans	66	16.5	.394	.304	.827	1.5	1.2			9.2
1970–71	Memphis	28	18.1	.409	.200	.795	2.0	1.6			12.1
1970–71	Pittsburgh	52	**31.3**	.471	.306	**.861**	**3.4**	**4.3**			**13.7**
1971–72	Pittsburgh	**79**	29.6	.468	.330	.845	2.5	3.9			13.4
1972–73	Dallas	42	26.7	**.473**	.388	.859	2.0	3.6			11.9
1973–74	Memphis	16	9.6	.343	.083	.800	1.0	.9	.2	.0	3.9
Career		283	24.2	.445	.298	.841	2.2	2.9	.2	.0	11.6
