= Jeff Meyer (basketball) =

American basketball player-coach (born 1954)

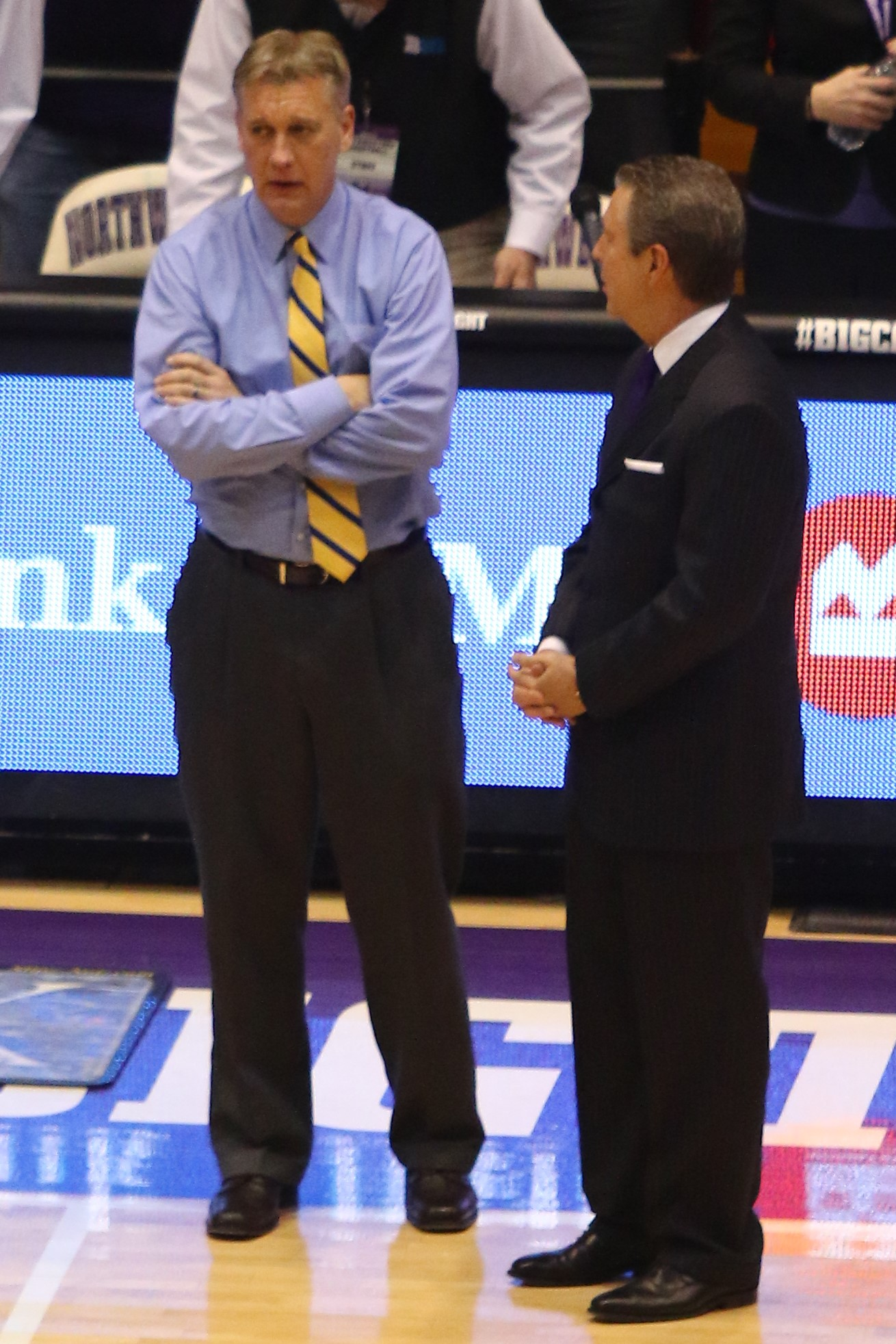
- Meyer (left) in 2015

Biographical details
- Born: June 21, 1954 (age 72); Lafayette, Indiana, U.S.
- Education: Taylor ('76)

Coaching career (HC unless noted)
- 1978–1980: Purdue (asst.)
- 1980–1981: South Florida (asst.)
- 1981–1997: Liberty
- 1998–2001: Winthrop (asst.)
- 2001–2004: Butler (asst.)
- 2004–2006: Missouri (asst.)
- 2006–2008: Indiana (asst.)
- 2008–2017: Michigan (asst.)
- 2017–2020: Butler (asst.)

Head coaching record
- Overall: 259–206 (.557)

Accomplishments and honors

Championships
- Big South tournament champion (1994); Big South regular season co-champions (1997); 2× Big Ten regular season champion (2007, 2014)

Jeffrey Dennis Meyer (born June 21, 1954) is a former American college basketball coach, most recently an assistant at Butler University. He was brought on in June 2017 as assistant coach by new head coach and former Michigan assistant LaVall Jordan. He previously served as a men's basketball assistant coach at Michigan under John Beilein and Indiana University during the Kelvin Sampson tenure.

He graduated in 1976 from Taylor University and played basketball with the Trojans while he was there.

Previously, he served as head coach at Liberty University where he remained the winningest coach in school history until Ritchie McKay broke his record on January 25, 2025. He was named head coach of the then Liberty Baptist College on March 25, 1981. He stepped down as head coach to become assistant to the president of Liberty on November 1, 1997.

On November 3, 2020, Meyer announced his retirement from coaching.

== Head coaching record ==
Record table
Season	Team	Overall	Conference	Standing	Postseason
Liberty Flames (NAIA) (1981–1983)
1981–82	Liberty	15–11			
1982–83	Liberty	23–9			5th at NAIA Nationals
Liberty Flames (Mason-Dixon Conference) (1983–1988)
1983–84	Liberty	19–10	5–5		
1984–85	Liberty	19–10	6–4		
1985–86	Liberty	18–13	6–4		
1986–87	Liberty	18–11	3–5		
1987–88	Liberty	13–15	4–4		
Liberty Flames (Division I Independent) (1988–1991)
1988–89	Liberty	10–17			
1989–90	Liberty	11–17			
1990–91	Liberty	5–23			
Liberty Flames (Big South Conference) (1991–2007)
1991–92	Liberty	22–7	10–4	2nd	
1992–93	Liberty	16–14	9–7	4th	
1993–94	Liberty	18–12	12–6	4th	NCAA First Round
1994–95	Liberty	12–16	7–9	5th	
1995–96	Liberty	17–12	9–5	T-2nd	
1996–97	Liberty	23–9	11–3	T-1st	
Liberty:		259–206 (.557)	82–56 (.594)		
Total:		259–206 (.557)			
National champion Postseason invitational champion Conference regular season champion Conference regular season and conference tournament champion Division regular season champion Division regular season and conference tournament champion Conference tournament champion
