= Ritchie McKay =

American basketball coach (born 1965)

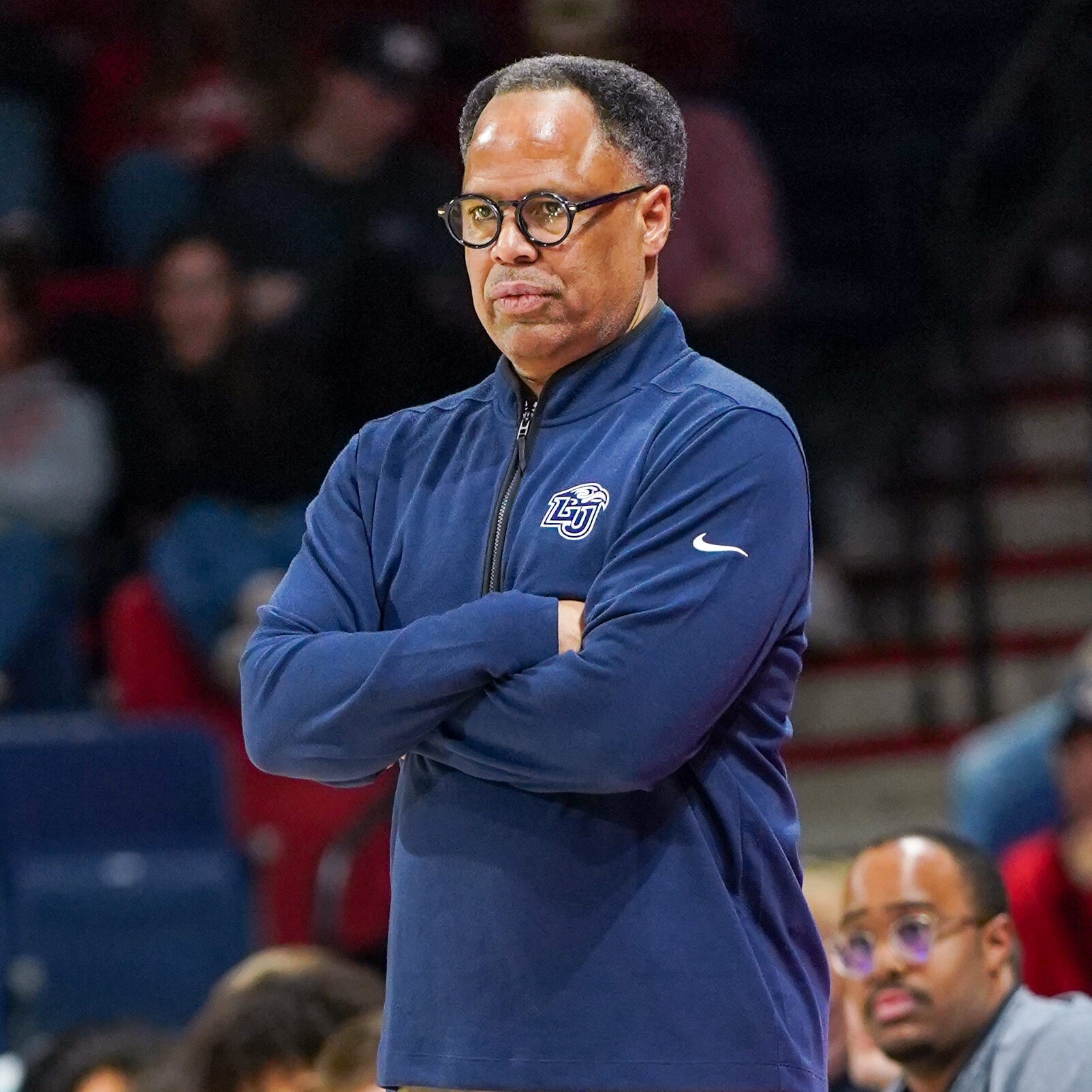
- McKay in 2024

Current position
- Title: Head coach
- Team: Liberty
- Conference: C-USA
- Record: 302–143 (.679)

Biographical details
- Born: April 22, 1965 (age 61); Indianapolis, Indiana, U.S.

Playing career
- 1983–1987: Seattle Pacific

Coaching career (HC unless noted)
- 1988–1989: Washington (asst.)
- 1989–1990: Queens (asst.)
- 1990–1991: Seattle Pacific (asst.)
- 1991–1993: Bradley (asst.)
- 1993–1995: Washington (asst.)
- 1996–1998: Portland State
- 1998–2000: Colorado State
- 2000–2002: Oregon State
- 2002–2007: New Mexico
- 2007–2009: Liberty
- 2009–2015: Virginia (assoc. HC)
- 2015–present: Liberty

Head coaching record
- Overall: 467–301 (.608)
- Tournaments: 1–4 (NCAA Division I); 4–3 (NIT); 5–3 (CIT)

Accomplishments and honors

Championships
- MWC tournament (2005); 3 ASUN tournament (2019–2021); 4 ASUN regular season (2019–2021, 2023); ASUN East Division (2022); 2 CUSA regular season (2025, 2026); CUSA tournament (2025)

Awards
- Jim Phelan Award (2019); Big South Coach of the Year (2016); 2× ASUN Coach of the Year (2020, 2021); C-USA co-Coach of the Year (2026)

Ritchie Lawrence McKay (born April 22, 1965) is an American basketball coach who is in his second stint as the head coach of the Liberty Flames of Liberty University. McKay for the previous six seasons had been the associate head coach to Tony Bennett for the Virginia Cavaliers at the University of Virginia. He had previously been the head coach of New Mexico, Oregon State, Colorado State, and Portland State.

On April 3, 2009, McKay was hand-selected by Bennett and lured from his head coaching position at Liberty to become associate head coach at Virginia. On April 1, 2015, he returned as head coach of the Liberty Flames. McKay holds the Liberty school record for single-season wins, with his team attaining a record of 30–4 (as of March 9, 2020) in the 2019–20 season after winning the ASUN Conference regular season and tournament championships.

== Life and sports ==
McKay got his first head coaching job with Portland State. After a poor first year, McKay led the team to a third-place conference finish in his second season. He used that success as a springboard to his next coaching job, this time at Colorado State. He stayed two seasons there before heading to Oregon State, and then another two at Oregon State before accepting the head coaching position at New Mexico. While there, he experienced mixed success. In 2005, his team won the Mountain West tournament and an automatic bid to the NCAA tournament. That successful season helped launch forward Danny Granger to an NBA career. Still, McKay couldn't turn New Mexico into a consistent program, and in February 2007, he was fired.

McKay then took a job at Liberty University, where he took the Flames to Big South Conference semifinals in back-to-back years. His second-year, with the help of Seth Curry, McKay led the LU to a Division I school-record 23 wins and a bid to the inaugural CollegeInsider.com Postseason Tournament. After the season ended, Curry transferred to Duke University, and McKay's longtime friend Tony Bennett was hired as head coach of the Virginia Cavaliers. Bennett then asked McKay to join his staff as his associate head coach, and McKay accepted. On April 1, 2015, McKay was selected to return to Liberty University as head coach.

En route to a school-record 28 wins, McKay's Flames defeated the storied UCLA Bruins on their home court in Los Angeles by 15 points, prompting the immediate firing of UCLA head coach Steve Alford in December 2018, before the Pac-12 Conference season even began. Ironically, it was Alford who had replaced McKay at New Mexico after his firing there nearly 12 years earlier. The following year, he was the 2019 recipient of the Jim Phelan Award.

=== Personal life ===
McKay graduated from Westwood High School, and played college basketball at Seattle Pacific University, where he set the single-season and career record for steals, and he was third in career assists. McKay has a wife, Julie, daughter, Ellie, and sons Luke and Gabriel.

== Head coaching record ==
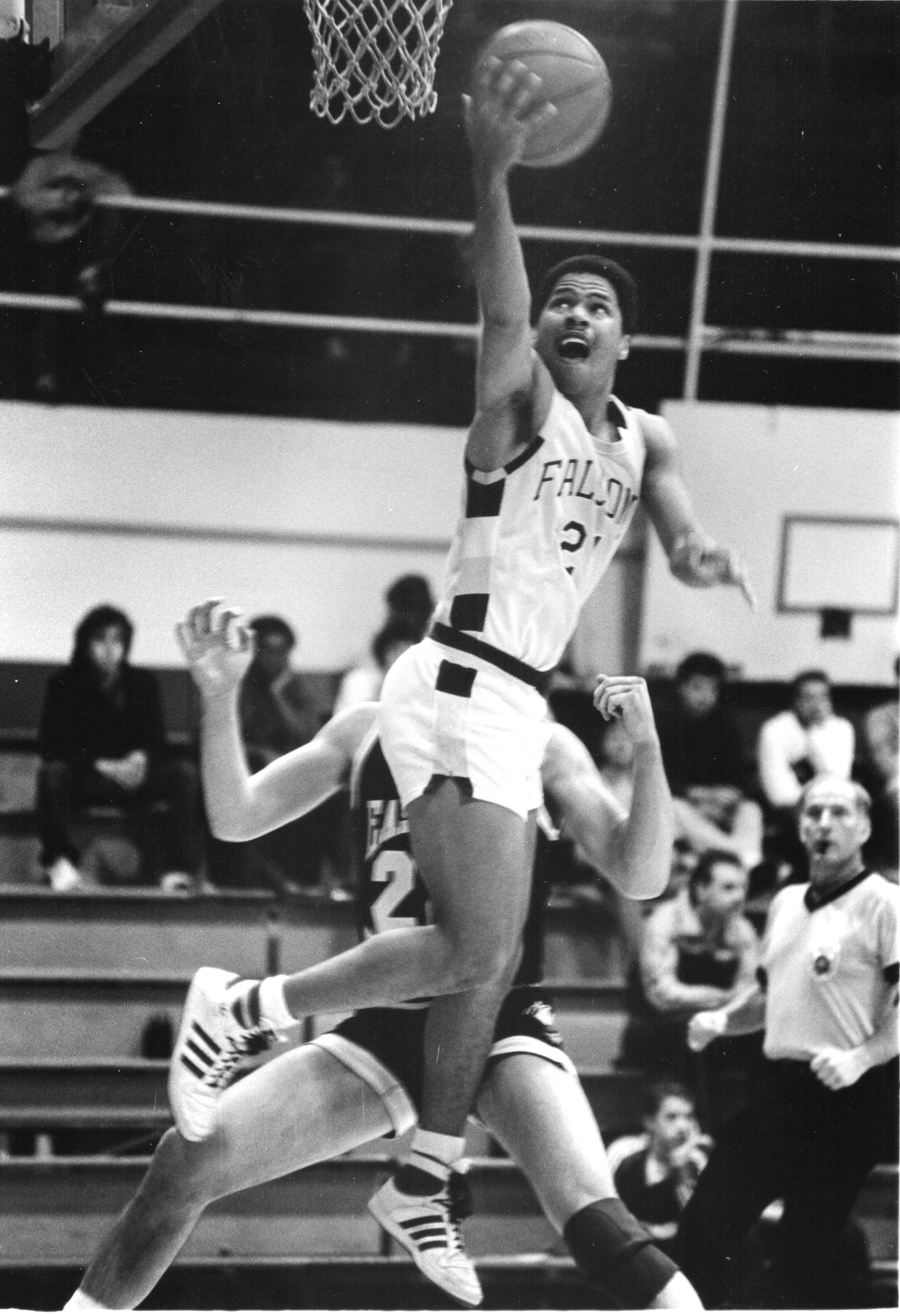
McKay at Seattle Pacific University

Record table
Season	Team	Overall	Conference	Standing	Postseason
Portland State Vikings (Big Sky Conference) (1996–1998)
1996–97	Portland State	9–17	6–10	7th	
1997–98	Portland State	15–12	10–6	T–3rd	
Portland State:		24–29 (.453)	16–16 (.500)		
Colorado State Rams (Western Athletic Conference) (1998–1999)
1998–99	Colorado State	19–11	7–7	T–4th (Mountain)	NIT Quarterfinals
Colorado State Rams (Mountain West Conference) (1999–2000)
1999–00	Colorado State	18–12	8–6	T–4th	
Colorado State:		37–23 (.617)	15–13 (.536)		
Oregon State Beavers (Pacific-10 Conference) (2000–2002)
2000–01	Oregon State	10–20	4–14	T–9th	
2001–02	Oregon State	12–17	4–14	9th	
Oregon State:		22–37 (.373)	8–28 (.222)		
New Mexico Lobos (Mountain West Conference) (2002–2007)
2002–03	New Mexico	10–18	4–10	7th	
2003–04	New Mexico	14–14	5–9	T–5th	
2004–05	New Mexico	26–7	10–4	2nd	NCAA Division I Round of 64
2005–06	New Mexico	17–13	8–8	5th	
2006–07	New Mexico	15–17	4–12	T–8th	
New Mexico:		82–69 (.543)	31–43 (.419)		
Liberty Flames (Big South Conference) (2007–2009)
2007–08	Liberty	16–16	7–7	4th	
2008–09	Liberty	23–12	12–6	3rd	CIT Quarterfinals
Liberty Flames (Big South Conference) (2015–2018)
2015–16	Liberty	13–19	10–8	T–5th	
2016–17	Liberty	21–14	14–4	3rd	CIT Quarterfinals
2017–18	Liberty	22–15	9–9	T–5th	CIT Semifinals
Liberty Flames (ASUN Conference) (2018–2023)
2018–19	Liberty	29–7	14–2	T–1st	NCAA Division I Round of 32
2019–20	Liberty	30–4	13–3	T–1st	NCAA Canceled*
2020–21	Liberty	23–6	11–2	1st	NCAA Division I Round of 64
2021–22	Liberty	22–11	12–4	1st (East)	
2022–23	Liberty	27–9	15–3	T–1st	NIT Second Round
Liberty Flames (Conference USA) (2023–present)
2023–24	Liberty	18–14	7–9	T–4th	
2024–25	Liberty	28–7	13–5	1st	NCAA Division I Round of 64
2025–26	Liberty	26–8	17–3	1st	NIT Second Round
2026–27	Liberty	4–1	0–0		
Liberty:		302–143 (.679)	154–65 (.703)		
Total:		467–301 (.608)			
National champion Postseason invitational champion Conference regular season champion Conference regular season and conference tournament champion Division regular season champion Division regular season and conference tournament champion Conference tournament champion

*The 2020 NCAA tournament was canceled due to concerns over the COVID-19 pandemic.
