= Mel Hankinson =

American basketball coach

Biographical details
- Born: January 10, 1943 (age 83)

Playing career
- 1961–1965: Indiana State (PA)
- Position: Guard

Coaching career (HC unless noted)
- 1970–1973: Slippery Rock
- 1973–1977: Roanoke
- 1977–1983: Delta State
- 1985–1987: Samford
- 1988–1993: The Master's
- 1993–1998: West Virginia (assistant)
- 1998–2002: Liberty

Head coaching record
- Overall: 361–353
- Tournaments: 3–2 (NAIA); 1–1 (NCAA Division II)

Accomplishments and honors

Championships
- Mason–Dixon (1974); PSAC Western Division (1972)

Mel Hankinson (born January 10, 1943) is an American former basketball coach and author. He served as the head men's basketball coach at Slippery Rock University of Pennsylvania (1970–1973), Roanoke College (1973–1977), Delta State University (1977–1983), Samford University (1985–1987), The Master's College—now known as The Master's University (1988–1993), and Liberty University (1998–2002). Hankinson has written a number of books and starred in videos on techniques for coaching basketball.

Hankinson spent over three decades coaching at the collegiate level. He came to his highest profile position as head coach on April 8, 1998, at Liberty University after three years as the top assistant at West Virginia University.

Hankinson began his collegiate career as a head coach at Slippery Rock University, where he spent three seasons highlighted by capturing the Pennsylvania State Athletic Conference (PSAC) Western Division title in 1972. For that season he was named NAIA District 18 Coach of the Year. Then the following year, Hankinson led the Rockets to the NAIA National Semifinals where the school recorded a fourth-place finish. He holds a master's degree from Indiana State University

== Playing career ==
Hankinson was a star player at Indiana State College—now known as Indiana University of Pennsylvania. The 59 points he scored on February 26, 1965, against Parsons still stands as a school and Pennsylvania State Athletic Conference record today.

== Books by Hankinson ==
- Progressions for Teaching Basketball—Mel Hankinson, Cleveland, MS (1979) ISBN 978-0-9606492-0-4
- Basketball Basketball Basketball Co-Authored by Margaret Wade—Delta State University, Cleveland, MS (1980) ISBN 978-9-99705-405-0
- Bench Coaching - Offensive Strategy—Championship Books, Ames, IA (1983) 60 pgs. ISBN 978-0-89279-062-3
- How to Teach Match-Up Zone—Educational Products Publishing Co. (1986) 68 pgs.
- Motivation—S.N. (1987) 24 pgs.
- Bench Coaching - Defensive Strategy—Championship Books, Ames, IA (1993) 131 pgs. ISBN 1-56404-053-4
- The Numbered Motion Offense—Championship Books, Ames, IA (1993) 110 pgs. ISBN 978-1-56404-052-7

== Head coaching record ==
Record table
Season	Team	Overall	Conference	Standing	Postseason
Slippery Rock (Pennsylvania State Athletic Conference) (1970–1973)
1970–71	Slippery Rock	10–15	2–6	5th (Western)	
1971–72	Slippery Rock	17–7	6–2	T–1st (Western)	
1972–73	Slippery Rock	23–7	6–4	T–2nd (Western)	NAIA Division Fourth Place
Slippery Rock:		50–29	14–12		
Roanoke Maroons (Mason–Dixon Conference) (1973–1977)
1973–74	Roanoke	24–6	10–0	1st	NCAA Division II Regional Third Place
1974–75	Roanoke	14–13			
1975–76	Roanoke	6–20			
1976–77	Roanoke	4–23			
Roanoke:		48–62			
Delta State Statesmen (Gulf South Conference) (1977–1983)
1977–78	Delta State	12–13	7–8	5th	
1978–79	Delta State	13–13	7–8	T–5th	
1979–80	Delta State	19–7	7–5	T–3rd	
1980–81	Delta State	15–13	4–8	T–5th	
1981–82	Delta State	18–9	8–4	3rd	
1982–83	Delta State	13–15	3–11	8th	
Delta State:		90–70	36–44		
Samford Bulldogs (Trans America Athletic Conference) (1984–1987)
1984–85	Samford	18–12	7–7	T–5th	
1985–86	Samford	16–13	8–6	2nd	
1986–87	Samford	4–22	1–17	10th	
Samford:		38–47	16–30		
The Master's Mustangs () (1988–1993)
1988–89	The Master's	20–13			
1989–90	The Master's	20–13			
1990–91	The Master's	20–14			
1991–92	The Master's	20–14			
1992–93	The Master's	19–14			
Masters:		99–68			
Liberty Flames (Big South Conference) (1998–2002)
1998–99	Liberty	4–23	0–10	6th	
1999–00	Liberty	14–14	4–10	7th	
2000–01	Liberty	13–15	5–9	6th	
2001–02	Liberty	5–25	2–12	8th	
Liberty:		36–77	11–41		
Total:		361–353			
National champion Postseason invitational champion Conference regular season champion Conference regular season and conference tournament champion Division regular season champion Division regular season and conference tournament champion Conference tournament champion
