= 1995–96 Big East Conference men's basketball season =

American college basketball season

1995–96 Big East Conference Men's Basketball Season
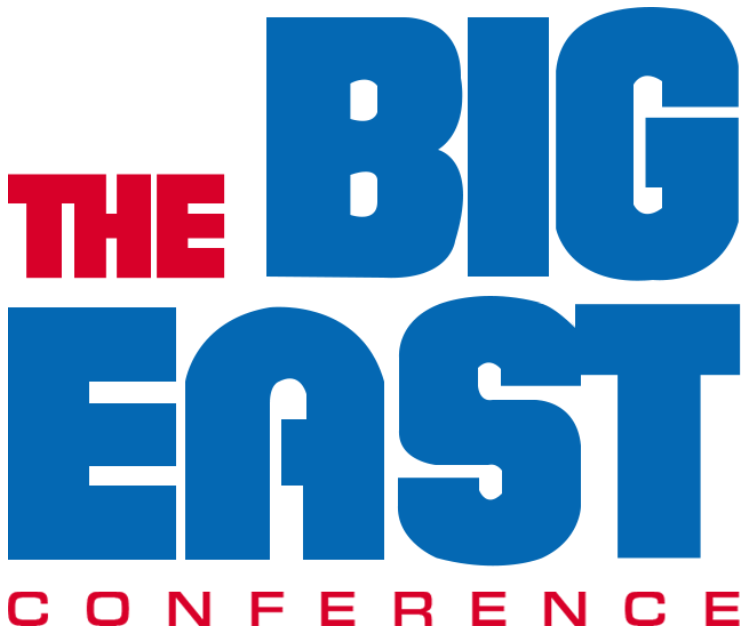
- League: NCAA Division I
- Sport: Basketball
- Duration: November 16, 1995 through March 9, 1996
- Teams: 13
- TV partner: ESPN

Regular Season
- Champion: Connecticut (Big East 6, 17–1); Georgetown (Big East 7, 13–5)
- Season MVP: Ray Allen – Connecticut

Tournament
- Champions: Connecticut
- Finals MVP: Victor Page – Georgetown

Basketball seasons
- 1994–95 1996–97

1995–96 Big East men's basketball standings
	Conf.				Overall
Team	W		L	PCT	W		L	PCT
Big East 6
No. 3 Connecticut†*	17	–	1	.944	30	–	2	.938
No. 10 Villanova	14	–	4	.778	26	–	7	.788
Boston College	10	–	8	.556	19	–	11	.633
West Virginia	7	–	11	.389	12	–	15	.444
St. John's	5	–	13	.278	11	–	16	.407
Notre Dame	4	–	14	.222	9	–	18	.333
Big East 7
No. 4 Georgetown	13	–	5	.722	29	–	8	.784
No. 15 Syracuse	12	–	6	.667	29	–	9	.763
Providence	9	–	9	.500	18	–	12	.600
Miami	8	–	10	.444	15	–	13	.536
Seton Hall	7	–	11	.389	12	–	16	.429
Rutgers	6	–	12	.333	9	–	18	.333
Pittsburgh	5	–	13	.278	10	–	17	.370
† 1996 Big East tournament winner As of April 1, 1996; *Connecticut's three NCAA Tournament games were vacated due to sanctions against the program; Connecticut′s disputed record was 32–3, 17–1. Rankings from AP Poll

The 1995–96 Big East Conference men's basketball season was the 17th in conference history, and involved its 13 full-time member schools.

Connecticut was the regular-season champion of the Big East 6 Division with a record of 17–1, and Georgetown won the regular-season Big East 7 Division championship with a record of 13–5. Connecticut won the Big East tournament championship.

== Season summary & highlights ==
- The Big East expanded to 13 teams, adding Notre Dame, Rutgers, and West Virginia as members. It was the conference's first expansion since the 1991–92 season.
- For the first time, the Big East used a divisional structure, with six of its teams playing in the Big East 6 Division and seven in the Big East 7 Division. The divisional structure lasted through the 1997–98 season.
- The Big East maintained an 18-game regular-season conference schedule, and its increased membership made it impossible for each team to play each other conference member twice in a home-and-home series during the regular season, as Big East teams had done since the 1980–81 season. Instead. each team played six conference opponents twice in a home-and-home series and the other six once each. The schedule was unbalanced, with teams playing anywhere from two to five home-and-home series against teams in their own division and anywhere from one to four home-and-home series against teams in the other division.
- Walk-on and future National Football League star quarterback Donovan McNabb appeared in five games for Syracuse.
- Connecticut finished as the regular-season champion of the Big East 6 Division with a record of 17–1. It was the fourth regular-season championship or co-championship for Connecticut.
- Georgetown finished as the regular-season champion of the Big East 7 Division with a record of 13–5. It was the sixth regular-season championship or co-championship for Georgetown.
- Connecticut won its second Big East tournament championship.
- In the NCAA Tournament, Syracuse advanced to the national championship game, losing to Kentucky and finishing as the national runner-up.
- Syracuse senior forward John Wallace was the top scorer in the 1996 NCAA Tournament.
- In May 1997, the NCAA vacated both of Connecticut's victories and its loss in the 1996 NCAA Tournament because two players, Kirk King and Ricky Moore, illegally accepted gifts during the 1995–96 season.

== Head coaches ==
School	Coach	Season	Notes
Boston College	Jim O'Brien	10th	Big East Co-Coach of the Year
Connecticut	Jim Calhoun	10th	Big East Co-Coach of the Year (3rd award)
Georgetown	John Thompson Jr.	24th	
Miami	Leonard Hamilton	6th	
Notre Dame	John MacLeod	5th	
Pittsburgh	Ralph Willard	2nd	
Providence	Pete Gillen	2nd	
Rutgers	Bob Wenzel	8th	
St. John's	Brian Mahoney	4th	Fired March 11, 1996
Seton Hall	George Blaney	2nd	
Syracuse	Jim Boeheim	20th	
Villanova	Steve Lappas	4th	
West Virginia	Gale Catlett	18th	

== Rankings ==
Connecticut, Georgetown, and Villanova were ranked in the Associated Press poll Top 25 all season, with Villanova reaching No. 2, Connecticut finishing as No. 3, and Georgetown finishing as No. 4. Syracuse was in the Top 25 for much of the season, and Boston College also spent time in the Top 25.

1995–96 Big East Conference Weekly Rankings Key: ██ Increase in ranking. ██ Decrease in ranking.
AP Poll	Pre	11/20	11/27	12/4	12/11	12/18	12/25	1/1	1/8	1/15	1/22	1/29	2/5	2/12	2/19	2/26	3/4	Final
Boston College								24		20	24	21	22	21	20			
Connecticut	6	6	9	9	8	8	7	7	6	5	4	4	4	3	3	4	3	3
Georgetown	5	5	6	6	7	6	6	6	5	8	6	9	8	14	11	8	6	4
Miami																		
Notre Dame																		
Pittsburgh																		
Providence																		
Rutgers																		
St. John's																		
Seton Hall																		
Syracuse					25	19	13	11	14	12	17	18	18	16	15	15	13	15
Villanova	3	3	3	2	2	7	8	8	7	7	7	6	6	4	4	6	9	10
West Virginia																		

== Regular-season statistical leaders ==
Scoring
Name	School	PPG
Allen Iverson	GU	25.0
Ray Allen	Conn	23.4
John Wallace	Syr	22.2
Zendon Hamilton	SJU	20.8
Kerry Kittles	Vill	20.4

Rebounding
Name	School	RPG
Zendon Hamilton	SJU	10.3
Danya Abrams	BC	9.6
Travis Knight	Conn	9.3
Jerome Williams	GU	8.8
John Wallace	Syr	8.7

Assists
Name	School	APG
Lazarus Sims	Syr	7.4
God Shammgod	Prov	6.5
Doron Sheffer	Conn	6.1
Doug Gottlieb	ND	5.7
Alvin Williams	Vill	5.4

Steals
Name	School	SPG
Allen Iverson	GU	3.4
Jerry McCullough	Vill	3.0
Adrian Griffin	SHU	2.5
Kerry Kittles	Vill	2.4
Dan Hurley	SHU	2.3

Blocks
Name	School	BPG
Jason Lawson	Vill	3.0
Eric Clark	RU	2.0
Travis Knight	Conn	2.0
Tim James	Mia	1.8
John Wallace	Syr	1.7

Field Goals
Name	School	FG%
Otis Hill	Syr	.571
Damian Owens	WVU	.513
John Wallace	Syr	.489
Chad Varga	Pitt	.489
Zendon Hamilton	SJU	.486

3-Pt Field Goals
Name	School	3FG%
Ray Allen	Conn	.466
Damon Santiago	RU	.438
Doron Sheffer	Conn	.406
Kerry Kittles	Vill	.404
(no other qualifiers)

Free Throws
Name	School	FT%
Geoff Billet	RU	.900
Austin Croshere	Prov	.852
Doron Sheffer	Conn	.849
Ryan Hoover	ND	.845
Ray Allen	Conn	.810

== Postseason ==
=== Big East tournament ===
==== Seeding ====
The division winner with the best record received the No. 1 seed in the Big East tournament, the division winner with the second-best record received the No. 2 seed, and the second-place finisher with the best record received the No. 3 seed. The rest of the schools were seeded fourth through thirteenth based on conference record and tiebreakers. Teams seeded fourth through thirteenth played a first-round game, and the other three teams received a bye into the second round.

The tournament's seeding was as follows: (1) Connecticut, (2) Georgetown, (3) Villanova, (4) Syracuse, (5) Boston College, (6) Providence, (7) Miami, (8) West Virginia, (9) Seton Hall, (10) Rutgers, (11) St. John's, (12) Pittsburgh, (13) Notre Dame.

==== Bracket ====
First round
8	West Virginia	78
9	Seton Hall	80
4	#13 Syracuse	76
13	Notre Dame	55
5	Boston College	70
12	Pittsburgh	66
6	Providence	80
11	St. John's	72
7	Miami	77
10	Rutgers	67

Second round
1	#3 Connecticut	79
9	Seton Hall	58
4	#13 Syracuse	69
5	Boston College	61
3	#9 Villanova	78
6	Providence	68
2	#6 Georgetown	92
7	Miami	62

Semifinals
1	#3 Connecticut	85
4	#13 Syracuse	67
3	#9 Villanova	76
2	#6 Georgetown	84

Championship Game
1	#3 Connecticut	75
2	#6 Georgetown	74

=== NCAA tournament ===
Five Big East teams received bids to the NCAA Tournament. Boston College and Villanova both lost in the second round, Connecticut in the regional semifinals, and Georgetown in the regional finals. Syracuse advanced to the national championship game, losing to Kentucky and finishing as the national runner-up. Syracuse senior forward John Wallace was the tournament's top scorer with 131 points.

In May 1997, the NCAA vacated both of Connecticut's victories in the tournament because two players, Kirk King and Ricky Moore, illegally accepted gifts during the 1995–96 season. At the same time, the NCAA vacated all of UMass's wins in the tournament, including the victory over Georgetown, because one of UMass's players, Marcus Camby, had accepted gifts from a sports agent during the 1995–96 season.

School	Region	Seed	Round 1	Round 2	Sweet 16	Elite 8	Final 4	Final
Syracuse	West	4	13 Montana State, W 88–55	12 Drexel, W 69–58	8 Georgia, W 83–81^{(OT)}	2 Kansas, W 60–57	SE5 Mississippi State, W 77–69	MW1 Kentucky, L 76–67
Georgetown	East	2	15 Mississippi Valley State, W 93–56	7 New Mexico, W 75–65	3 Texas Tech, W 98–90	2 ~~UMass~~, L 86–62		
~~Connecticut~~	Southeast	1	16 Colgate, ~~W~~ 68–59	9 Eastern Michigan, ~~W~~ 95–81	5 Mississippi State, L 60–55			
Villanova	Midwest	3	14 Portland, W 92–58	6 Louisville, L 68–64				
Boston College	Southeast	11	6 Indiana, W 64–51	3 Georgia Tech, L 103–89				

=== National Invitation Tournament ===
Providence received a bid to the National Invitation Tournament, which did not yet have seeding. The Friars lost in the second round.

School	Round 1	Round 2
Providence	Fairfield, W 91–79	Saint Joseph's, L 82–62

== Awards and honors ==
=== Big East Conference ===
Player of the Year:

- * Ray Allen, Connecticut, G Jr.

Defensive Player of the Year:

- Allen Iverson, Georgetown, G, So.

Rookie of the Year:

- Scoonie Penn, Boston College, G, Fr.

Co-Coaches of the Year:

- Jim Calhoun, Connecticut (10th season)
- Jim O'Brien, Boston College (10th season)

All-Big East First Team

- Danya Abrams, Boston College, F Jr., 6 ft 7 in (201 cm), 251 lb (114 kg), Westchester, N.Y.
- Ray Allen, Connecticut, G Jr., 6 ft 5 in (196 cm), 205 lb (93 kg), Merced, Calif.
- Allen Iverson, Georgetown, G., So., 6 ft 0 in (183 cm), 165 lb (75 kg), Hampton, Va.
- John Wallace, Syracuse, F Sr., 6 ft 8 in (203 cm), 225 lb (102 kg), Rochester, N.Y.
- Kerry Kittles, Villanova, G Sr., 6 ft 5 in (196 cm), 179 lb (81 kg), Dayton, Ohio

All-Big East Second Team:

- Doron Sheffer, Connecticut, G Jr., 6 ft 5 in (196 cm), 200 lb (91 kg), Ramat Efal, Israel
- Damon Santiago, Rutgers, G Sr., 6 ft 1 in (185 cm), 195 lb (88 kg), The Bronx, N.Y.
- Adrian Griffin, Seton Hall, F Sr., 6 ft 5 in (196 cm), 230 lb (104 kg), Wichita, Kan.
- Zendon Hamilton, St. John's, C, So., 6 ft 9 in (206 cm), 240 lb (109 kg), South Floral Park, N.Y.
- Jason Lawson, Villanova, C Jr., 6 ft 11 in (211 cm), 240 lb (109 kg), Philadelphia, Pa.

All-Big East Third Team:

- Jerome Williams, Georgetown, F Sr., 6 ft 9 in (206 cm), 206 lb (93 kg), Washington, D.C.
- Othella Harrington, Georgetown, C Sr., 6 ft 9 in (206 cm), 240 lb (109 kg), Jackson, Miss.
- Pat Garrity, Notre Dame, F, So., 6 ft 9 in (206 cm), 238 lb (108 kg), Las Vegas, Nev.
- Austin Croshere, Providence, C Jr., 6 ft 10 in (208 cm), 235 lb (107 kg), Los Angeles, Calif.
- Damian Owens, West Virginia, F, So., 6 ft 6 in (198 cm), 215 lb (98 kg), Washington, D.C.

Big East All-Rookie Team:

- Scoonie Penn, Boston College, G., Fr., 5 ft 11 in (180 cm), 180 lb (82 kg), Yonkers, N.Y.
- Victor Page, Georgetown, G, Fr., 6 ft 3 in (191 cm), 200 lb (91 kg), Washington, D.C.
- Tim James, Miami, F, Fr., 6 ft 7 in (201 cm), 212 lb (96 kg), Miami, Fla.
- God Shammgod, Providence, G, Fr., 6 ft 0 in (183 cm), 169 lb (77 kg), New York, N.Y.
- Geoff Billet, Rutgers, G, Fr., 6 ft 0 in (183 cm), New Jersey
- Gordon Malone, West Virginia, F, So., 6 ft 11 in (211 cm), 215 lb (98 kg), Brooklyn, N.Y.

=== All-Americans ===
The following players were selected to the 1996 Associated Press All-America teams.

Consensus All-America First Team:

- Ray Allen, Connecticut, Key Stats: 23.4 ppg, 6.5 rpg, 3.3 apg, 1.7 spg, 47.2 FG%, 46.6 3P%, 818 points
- Allen Iverson, Georgetown, Key Stats: 25.0 ppg, 3.8 rpg, 4.7 apg, 3.4 spg, 48.0 FG%, 36.6 3P%, 926 points
- Kerry Kittles, Villanova, Key Stats: 20.4 ppg, 7.1 rpg, 3.5 apg, 2.4 spg, 45.5 FG%, 40.4 3P%, 613 points

Consensus All-America Second Team:

- John Wallace, Syracuse, Key Stats: 22.2 ppg, 8.7 rpg, 2.4 apg, 1.2 spg, 48.9 FG%, 42.0 3P%, 845 points

First Team All-America:

- Ray Allen, Connecticut, Key Stats: 23.4 ppg, 6.5 rpg, 3.3 apg, 1.7 spg, 47.2 FG%, 46.6 3P%, 818 points
- Allen Iverson, Georgetown, Key Stats: 25.0 ppg, 3.8 rpg, 4.7 apg, 3.4 spg, 48.0 FG%, 36.6 3P%, 926 points
- Kerry Kittles, Villanova, Key Stats: 20.4 ppg, 7.1 rpg, 3.5 apg, 2.4 spg, 45.5 FG%, 40.4 3P%, 613 points

Second Team All-America:

- John Wallace, Syracuse, Key Stats: 22.2 ppg, 8.7 rpg, 2.4 apg, 1.2 spg, 48.9 FG%, 42.0 3P%, 845 points

== See also ==
- 1995–96 NCAA Division I men's basketball season
- 1995–96 Boston College Eagles men's basketball team
- 1995–96 Connecticut Huskies men's basketball team
- 1995–96 Georgetown Hoyas men's basketball team
- 1995–96 Notre Dame Fighting Irish men's basketball team
- 1995–96 Pittsburgh Panthers men's basketball team
- 1995–96 St. John's Red Storm men's basketball team
- 1995–96 Syracuse Orangemen basketball team
- 1995–96 Villanova Wildcats men's basketball team
