= 1996 NCAA Division I men's basketball championship game =

American college basketball final

1996 NCAA Tournament Championship Game
National championship game
Syracuse Orangemen	Kentucky Wildcats
Big East	SEC
(29–8)	(34–2)
67	76
Head coach: Jim Boeheim	Head coach: Rick Pitino
- AP: 15
- Coaches: 14
- AP: 2
- Coaches: 2
	1st half	2nd half	Total
Syracuse Orangemen	33	34	67
Kentucky Wildcats	42	34	76
- Date: April 1, 1996
- Venue: Continental Airlines Arena, East Rutherford, New Jersey
- MVP: Tony Delk, Kentucky
- Favorite: Kentucky by 14
- Referees: John Clougherty, Scott Thornley and David Libbey
- Attendance: 19,229

United States TV coverage
- Network: CBS
- Announcers: Jim Nantz (play-by-play); Billy Packer (color); Michele Tafoya and Andrea Joyce (sideline)

The 1996 NCAA Men's Division I Basketball Championship Game was the finals of the 1996 NCAA Men's Division I Basketball Tournament and it determined the national champion for the 1995-96 NCAA Division I men's basketball season The game was played on April 1, 1996, at Continental Airlines Arena in East Rutherford, New Jersey, and featured the Midwest Regional Champion, #1-seeded Kentucky versus the West Regional Champion, #4-seeded Syracuse.

This was the first time the national championship game was held in the Greater New York Area since 1950. This was also the last men's national championship game to be held in a basketball/hockey-specific facility. Every Men's National Championship Game since then has been held in a domed stadium (usually built for football) because of NCAA venue capacity requirements. Therefore, this was the last time the national championship game was held in the Greater New York Area, or anywhere else in the Northeastern United States.

Kentucky defeated Syracuse 76–67 to win their first national championship since 1978. Kentucky star Antoine Walker faced off against former high school teammate, Donovan McNabb, in the national championship against Syracuse University. McNabb would later gain fame as a quarterback with the Philadelphia Eagles.

== Participating teams ==
=== Syracuse Orangemen ===
- West
  - (4) Syracuse 88, (13) Montana State 55
  - (4) Syracuse 69, (12) Drexel 58
  - (4) Syracuse 83, (8) Georgia 81 (OT)
  - (4) Syracuse 60, (2) Kansas 57
- Final Four
  - (W4) Syracuse 77, (SE5) Mississippi State 69

=== Kentucky Wildcats ===
- Midwest
  - (1) Kentucky 110, (16) San Jose State 72
  - (1) Kentucky 84, (9) Virginia Tech 60
  - (1) Kentucky 101, (4) Utah 70
  - (1) Kentucky 83, (2) Wake Forest 63
- Final Four
  - (MW1) Kentucky 81, (E1) Massachusetts 74

== Starting lineups ==
Syracuse	Position	Kentucky
Jason Cipolla	G	† Tony Delk
Lazarus Sims	G	Anthony Epps
Todd Burgan	F	Derek Anderson
John Wallace	F	Antoine Walker
Otis Hill	C	Walter McCarty
† 1996 Consensus First Team All-American

== Game summary ==
External videos
- Full game broadcast by CBS on YouTube

CBS

April 1, 1996

Box score

#MW1 Kentucky Wildcats 76, #W4 Syracuse Orangemen 67
Pts: Tony Delk - 24; Rebs: Antoine Walker - 9 Asts: Anthony Epps - 7	Pts: John Wallace - 29; Rebs: John Wallace, Otis Hill - 10; Asts: Lazarus Sims - 7 Halftime Score: Kentucky, 42-33

Continental Airlines Arena - East Rutherford, New Jersey
Attendance: 19,229
