= John Wallace (basketball) =

American basketball player (born 1974)

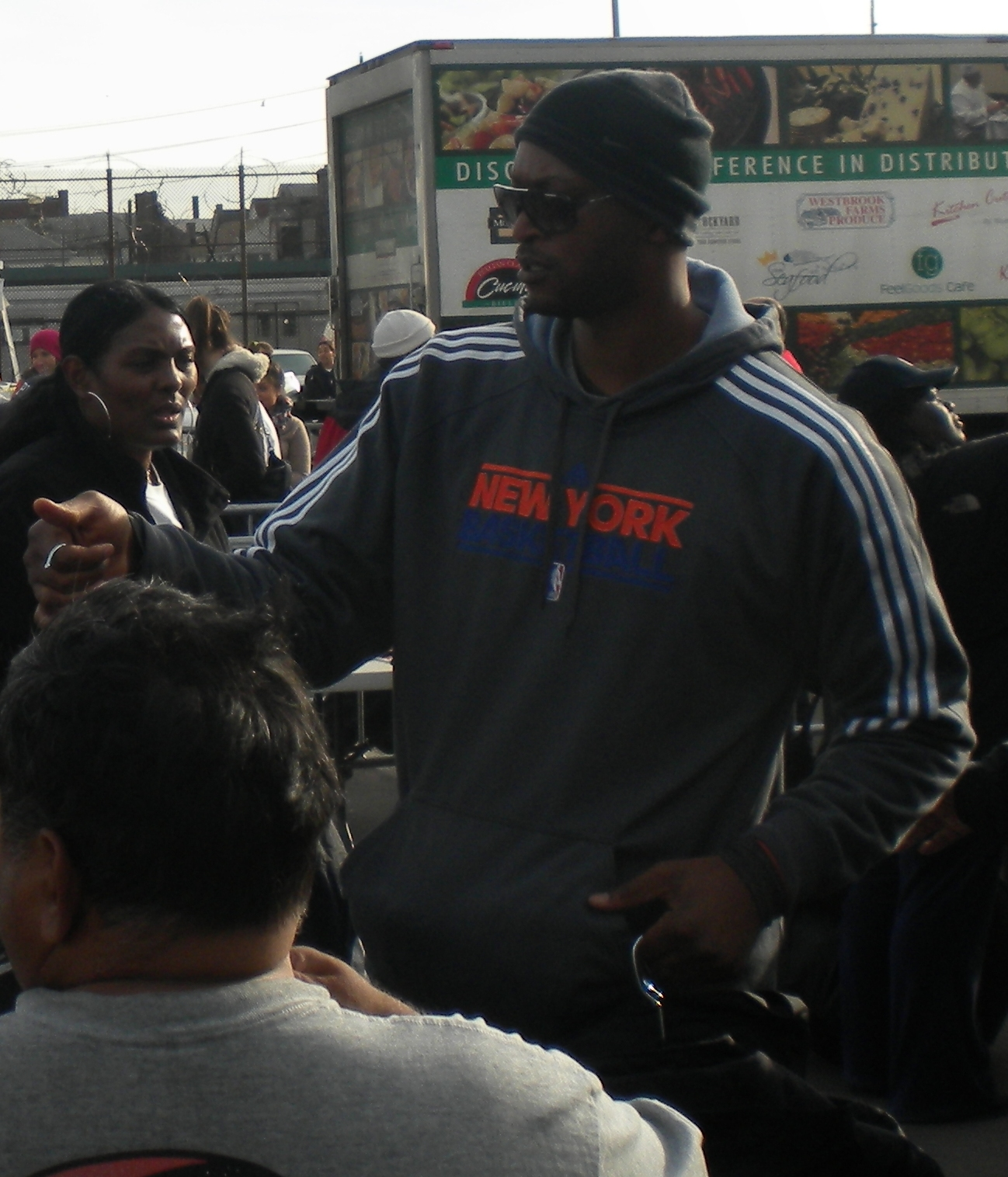

Personal information
- Born: February 9, 1974 (age 52) Rochester, New York, U.S.
- Listed height: 6 ft 9 in (2.06 m)
- Listed weight: 225 lb (102 kg)

Career information
- High school: Greece Athena (Rochester, New York)
- College: Syracuse (1992–1996)
- NBA draft: 1996: 1st round, 18th overall pick
- Drafted by: New York Knicks
- Playing career: 1996–2005
- Position: Small forward
- Number: 44, 22

Career history
- 1996–1997: New York Knicks
- 1997–1999: Toronto Raptors
- 1999–2000: New York Knicks
- 2000–2001: Detroit Pistons
- 2001–2002: Phoenix Suns
- 2002–2003: Panionios
- 2003–2004: Miami Heat
- 2005: Snaidero Udine

Career highlights
- Consensus second-team All-American (1996); 2× First-team All-Big East (1995, 1996); No. 44 retired by Syracuse Orange; Second-team Parade All-American (1992); McDonald's All-American (1992); Mr. New York Basketball (1992)

Career NBA statistics
- Points: 2,091 (7.6 ppg)
- Rebounds: 1,061 (2.8 rpg)
- Assists: 281 (0.7 apg)
- Stats at NBA.com
- Stats at Basketball Reference

John Gilbert Wallace (born February 9, 1974) is an American former professional basketball player and current broadcaster on MSG Network. He also hosts a live stream and podcast called "Power Forward w/ John Wallace" on SportsCastr. A 6' 8" forward, Wallace played seven seasons in the National Basketball Association (NBA), in addition to stints in Greece and Italy.

A 1992 graduate of Greece Athena High School in Rochester, New York, Wallace led Syracuse University to the NCAA championship game against the Kentucky Wildcats during his senior season in 1996. After his college graduation, Wallace was selected with the 18th pick in the 1996 NBA draft by the New York Knicks. He played seven seasons in the NBA with the Knicks, Toronto Raptors, Detroit Pistons, Phoenix Suns, and the Miami Heat.

Wallace is an executive board member of the Heavenly Productions Foundation, a 501c-3 charity based in Armonk, New York whose mission is to help children in need and in distress.

== Syracuse University career ==
Wallace began playing basketball as a freshman at Greece Athena High School in his hometown of Rochester, New York. As a high school junior, he began to draw attention from basketball programs and coaches in Central and Western New York, including from Syracuse University head coach Jim Boeheim. While Boeheim was recruiting Wallace, Syracuse's basketball program was being investigated by the NCAA. Two years of investigations culminated in the program losing one scholarship for both the 1993–94 and 1994–95 academic years, and a postseason ban for the 1992–93 season, As a high school senior, Wallace was named to the 1992 McDonald's All-American Team, alongside notable future NBA and college players Jason Kidd, Tony Delk, and Corliss Williamson.

=== Freshman year (1992–93) ===
In spite of the ongoing investigations, Wallace honored his letter of intent to attend Syracuse and arrived on campus in the fall of 1992. Wallace started all 29 games for the Orange as a freshman, averaging 11.1 points and 7.6 rebounds per game. The postseason ban prevented Syracuse from competing in the NCAA Tournament, but the team finished with a 20–9 record and advanced to the Big East Championship, losing to Seton Hall 103–70 in Madison Square Garden.

=== Sophomore year (1993–94) ===
Having been an "unsung hero" of the sanctioned '92–93 team, Wallace was a pivotal member of the '93–94 squad from the outset, a team that was ranked 20th entering the season. Wallace again started every game for the Orange and averaged 15.0 points and 9.0 rebounds per game.

Entering the 1994 Big East tournament, Syracuse was ranked 13th in the country and 2nd in the Big East, behind a Connecticut team led by freshman guard Ray Allen and first-team All-American forward Donyell Marshall. In spite of a 30-point performance from junior shooting guard Lawrence Moten, Syracuse was bounced from the tournament in the first round by Seton Hall, losing 81–80 in overtime. Syracuse headed to the NCAA Tournament as the 4th seed in the West region. The team advanced to the Sweet Sixteen where they would fall to the region's top seeded Missouri Tigers 98–88 in overtime. Wallace had a disappointing game, scoring only six points on 2–8 shooting from the field, a performance that served as offseason motivation heading into his junior year.

=== Junior year (1994–95) ===
Syracuse entered the '94–95 season as the 8th-ranked team in America, before suffering a shocking 110–104 Preseason NIT overtime loss to George Washington in their first game. The Orange subsequently rattled off 14 consecutive wins and ultimately finished the regular season with a record of 21–8. The 1995 Big East tournament would end with another first round overtime loss, this time to Providence by a score of 71–69. Syracuse headed to the NCAA Tournament as the 7th seed in the Midwest region. After narrowly defeating Southern Illinois 96–92 in the First Round, the Orange faced off against Corliss Williamson, Scotty Thurman and the defending NCAA Champion Arkansas Razorbacks in the Second Round. In the game, Wallace led all scorers with 29 points on 9–12 shooting from the field. Senior guard Lawrence Moten – who had passed Derrick Coleman as Syracuse's all-time leading scorer and passed Terry Dehere as the Big East's all-time leading scorer earlier that season – would score 21. But the Orange fell in overtime 96–94.

=== Senior year (1995–96) ===
Though Wallace was projected to be a top-15 selection in the 1995 NBA draft following his junior year, he opted to return to Syracuse as the team's bona fide leader. The Orange began the '95–96 season unranked, but by the end of the regular season they had amassed a 24–8 record and were ranked 15th. For the season, Wallace averaged 22.2 points and 8.7 rebounds per game, leading Syracuse to the Big East tournament semifinals to face UConn. The 3rd-ranked Huskies proved too much for the Orange, winning 85–67.

The 15th-ranked Orange headed to the 1996 NCAA Tournament as the 4th seed in the West region. After soundly beating Montana State and Drexel in the first two rounds, Syracuse faced Georgia in the Sweet Sixteen. The Orange forced overtime with the Bulldogs thanks to a 3/4-court baseball pass from Wallace to junior guard Jason Cipolla who made a baseline 15-footer as time expired in regulation. With 14.8 seconds remaining in overtime, Wallace scored on a lob from point guard Lazarus Sims to give the Orange an 80–78 lead. With 7.1 seconds remaining, Georgia made a 3-pointer to put the Bulldogs ahead 81–80. Rather than call a timeout to set up a final play, forward Todd Burgan inbounded to Wallace who dribbled to the top of the key and connected on a 3-point leaner over two Georgia defenders. The shot gave Wallace 30 points on the night, complemented by 15 rebounds, and sealed the 83–81 victory for the Orange, and a spot in the Elite 8.

Syracuse's Elite 8 opponent was a Kansas Jayhawks team led by freshman forward Paul Pierce. Syracuse would win the game by a score of 60–57 to advance to the school's first Final Four since 1987. In the semifinal against Mississippi State, a roster that included future NBA players Erick Dampier and Dontae' Jones, Wallace led all scorers with 21 in a 77–69 Syracuse win. In the Final, Syracuse faced off against a Rick Pitino-coached Kentucky team that was ranked either first or second throughout the season, and boasted a roster that would produce five NBA first-round picks. Wallace led all scorers with 29 points, and added 10 rebounds and a block, but the Orange would fall by a score of 76–67. Despite the loss, Wallace finished his career as the program's third leading scorer behind only Derrick Coleman and Lawrence Moten.

On February 29, 2020, Wallace had his number 44 retired into the rafters at the Carrier Dome, making him the last Syracuse basketball player to ever wear the "Magic 44."

== Career statistics ==
=== NBA ===
Legend
GP	Games played	GS	Games started	MPG	Minutes per game
FG%	Field goal percentage	3P%	3-point field goal percentage	FT%	Free throw percentage
RPG	Rebounds per game	APG	Assists per game	SPG	Steals per game
BPG	Blocks per game	PPG	Points per game	**Bold**	Career high
*	Led the league

==== Regular season ====
Year	Team	GP	GS	MPG	FG%	3P%	FT%	RPG	APG	SPG	BPG	PPG
1996–97	New York	68	6	11.6	**.517**	**.500**	.718	2.3	.5	.3	.4	4.8
1997–98	Toronto	**82***	**36**	**28.8**	.478	**.500**	.717	**4.5**	**1.3**	**.8**	**1.2**	**14.0**
1998–99	Toronto	48	3	16.9	.432	–	.700	3.6	1.0	.3	.9	8.6
1999–00	New York	60	0	13.3	.467	.000	.804	2.3	.4	.2	.2	6.5
2000–01	Detroit	40	0	13.2	.424	.133	.778	2.1	.6	.3	.4	5.9
2001–02	Phoenix	46	0	10.7	.435	.385	**.870**	1.8	.6	.2	.2	5.0
2003–04	Miami	37	0	9.9	.421	.385	.775	1.6	.4	.1	.2	4.3
Career		381	45	16.1	.462	.300	.740	2.8	.7	.4	.6	7.6

==== Playoffs ====
Year	Team	GP	GS	MPG	FG%	3P%	FT%	RPG	APG	SPG	BPG	PPG
1997	New York	**4**	1	**10.0**	**.267**	.000	1.000	**1.8**	**1.3**	.3	**.5**	**2.5**
2000	New York	1	0	4.0	.000	–	–	1.0	.0	**1.0**	.0	.0
Career		5	1	8.8	.235	.000	1.000	1.6	1.0	.4	.4	2.0

=== College ===
Season	College	GP	MPG	RPG	APG	PPG
1992–93	Syracuse	29	29.8	7.6	1.3	11.1
1993–94	Syracuse	30	32.6	9.0	1.7	15.0
1994–95	Syracuse	30	33.0	8.2	2.6	16.8
1995–96	Syracuse	38	36.3	8.7	2.4	22.2
**Career**	**4 Seasons**	**127**	**33.1**	**8.4**	**2.0**	**16.7**

== Broadcast career and philanthropy ==
After retiring from professional basketball following a season with Snaidero Udine in the Italian basketball league in 2005, Wallace went on to work in the New York Knicks' corporate office as a team ambassador. In 2014, Wallace made his first of many guest appearances as an analyst on MSG. Frequent guest appearances on programs such as "MSG 150" evolved into Wallace becoming a regular cast member on MSG's "People Talking Sports" in 2018.

On November 3, 2020, Wallace launched a live stream and podcast called "Power Forward w/ John Wallace." His first guest was his former Syracuse teammate, Lawrence Moten. According to its official description, "Power Forward w/ John Wallace" features far-ranging conversations "with former teammates, titans of industry, and fascinating guests from all walks of life." The live streams are broadcast on SportsCastr, a digital media platform.

Beyond working as a professional broadcaster, Wallace is an executive board member of the Heavenly Productions Foundation, a 501(c)-3 not for profit organization whose mission is to help children in need and in distress.

Wallace played the role of Lonnie in Spike Lee's 1998 film, He Got Game.

== See also ==
- List of NCAA Division I men's basketball players with 2000 points and 1000 rebounds
