= Lazarus Sims =

American basketball player and coach

Personal information
- Born: 28 March 1972 (age 54) Syracuse, New York
- Listed height: 6 ft 4 in (1.93 m)
- Listed weight: 205 lb (93 kg)

Career information
- High school: Henninger High School (Syracuse, New York)
- College: Syracuse (1992–1996)
- Playing career: 1996–2007
- Position: Point guard

Career history

Playing
- 1996–1997: Szczecin
- 1997: Atlanta Trojans
- 1997–1998: Wisconsin Blast
- 1998: Cocodrilos de Caracas
- 1998–1999: Atlanta Trojans
- 1999–2001: St. Louis Swarm
- 2001: Florida Sea Dragons
- 2001–2002: Rockford Lightning
- 2002: Florida Sea Dragons
- 2002–2003: Great Lakes Storm
- 2002–2003: Grand Rapids Hoops
- 2003: Dodge City Legend
- 2003–2005: Harlem Globetrotters
- 2005: Panteras de Miranda
- 2005–2006: Rochester RazorSharks
- 2006: Dodge City Legend
- 2006–2007: Rochester RazorSharks

Coaching
- 2007–2012: Syracuse (Player Development)
- 2012–2014: Binghamton (Assistant)
- 2020: Tampa Bay Titans
- 2021: Gulf Coast Lions

Career highlights
- No. 3 uniform retired by Rochester Razorsharks; ABA Champion 2006; IBL Champion 2001

Lazarus Sims (born March 28, 1972) is an American former professional basketball player. He also worked as the head coach of the Gulf Coast Lions of The Basketball League (TBL).

Sims played at Syracuse from 1992 to 1996. He averaged 7.4 assists per game in his final season at Syracuse. He ranks 8th on the school's all-time assist list with 432 assists. In August 2007, he returned to Syracuse after being appointed to head coach Jim Boeheim's staff as the player development coach.

== College career ==
Lazarus Sims played college basketball at Syracuse from 1992 to 1996. As a senior, he averaged 6.3 points, 3.7 rebounds, and 7.4 assists per game, leading the Big East in assists.

Sims started alongside John Wallace during Syracuse’s run to the 1996 NCAA Tournament championship game, where they finished national runners-up. He finished his Syracuse career with 385 points and 432 assists in 114 games.

Sims was also a teammate of future NFL quarterback Donovan McNabb, who played basketball at Syracuse.

== Stats ==
=== College ===
Season	College	GP	MPG	RPG	APG	PPG
1992-93	Syracuse	20	-	0.6	1.2	1.0
1993-94	Syracuse	26	-	1.1	1.9	1.3
1994-95	Syracuse	30	-	1.4	2.6	3.0
1995-96	Syracuse	38	-	3.7	7.4	6.3
Career	4 Seasons	114	-	1.9	3.8	3.4

== Post-playing career ==
In August 2007, Sims was named the player development coach for Syracuse's men's basketball team, returning to his college program that he graduated from in 1996 and effectively ending his eleven-year professional playing career. In June 2012, Sims accepted a job at Binghamton University to work on the staff of the school's first-year coach Tommy Dempsey, joining as an assistant to the head coach.

In an interview, Lawrence Moten said that Sims is quiet and likes music and computers.
