= 1995–96 Pittsburgh Panthers men's basketball team =

American college basketball season

1995–96 Pittsburgh Panthers men's basketball
- Conference: Big East Conference (1979–2013)
- Record: 10–17 (5–13 Big East)
- Head coach: Ralph Willard (2nd season)
- Assistant coaches: Bobby Jones (2nd season); Sean Miller (1st season); Sean Cleary (2nd season)
- Home arena: Fitzgerald Field House (Capacity: 4,122)

1995–96 Big East men's basketball standings
	Conf.				Overall
Team	W		L	PCT	W		L	PCT
Big East 6
No. 3 Connecticut†*	17	–	1	.944	30	–	2	.938
No. 10 Villanova	14	–	4	.778	26	–	7	.788
Boston College	10	–	8	.556	19	–	11	.633
West Virginia	7	–	11	.389	12	–	15	.444
St. John's	5	–	13	.278	11	–	16	.407
Notre Dame	4	–	14	.222	9	–	18	.333
Big East 7
No. 4 Georgetown	13	–	5	.722	29	–	8	.784
No. 15 Syracuse	12	–	6	.667	29	–	9	.763
Providence	9	–	9	.500	18	–	12	.600
Miami	8	–	10	.444	15	–	13	.536
Seton Hall	7	–	11	.389	12	–	16	.429
Rutgers	6	–	12	.333	9	–	18	.333
Pittsburgh	5	–	13	.278	10	–	17	.370
† 1996 Big East tournament winner As of April 1, 1996; *Connecticut's three NCAA Tournament games were vacated due to sanctions against the program; Connecticut′s disputed record was 32–3, 17–1. Rankings from AP Poll

The 1995–96 Pittsburgh Panthers men's basketball team represented the University of Pittsburgh in the 1995–96 NCAA Division I men's basketball season. Led by head coach Ralph Willard, the Panthers finished with a record of 10–17.
