= 1995–96 Miami Hurricanes men's basketball team =

American college basketball season

1995–96 Miami Hurricanes men's basketball
- Conference: Atlantic Coast Conference
- Record: 15-13 (8-10 Big East)
- Head coach: Leonard Hamilton
- Home arena: Miami Arena

1995–96 Big East men's basketball standings
	Conf.				Overall
Team	W		L	PCT	W		L	PCT
Big East 6
No. 3 Connecticut†*	17	–	1	.944	30	–	2	.938
No. 10 Villanova	14	–	4	.778	26	–	7	.788
Boston College	10	–	8	.556	19	–	11	.633
West Virginia	7	–	11	.389	12	–	15	.444
St. John's	5	–	13	.278	11	–	16	.407
Notre Dame	4	–	14	.222	9	–	18	.333
Big East 7
No. 4 Georgetown	13	–	5	.722	29	–	8	.784
No. 15 Syracuse	12	–	6	.667	29	–	9	.763
Providence	9	–	9	.500	18	–	12	.600
Miami	8	–	10	.444	15	–	13	.536
Seton Hall	7	–	11	.389	12	–	16	.429
Rutgers	6	–	12	.333	9	–	18	.333
Pittsburgh	5	–	13	.278	10	–	17	.370
† 1996 Big East tournament winner As of April 1, 1996; *Connecticut's three NCAA Tournament games were vacated due to sanctions against the program; Connecticut′s disputed record was 32–3, 17–1. Rankings from AP Poll

The 1995–96 Miami Hurricanes men's basketball team represented the University of Miami during the 1995–96 NCAA Division I men's basketball season. The Hurricanes, led by head coach Leonard Hamilton, played their home games at the Miami Arena and were members of the Big East Conference.

On December 27, 1995, Tennessee defeated Miami (FL) in the Orange Bowl Basketball Classic at Miami Arena.

Miami finished the season with a 15–13 record. The Hurricanes were eliminated from Big East tournament in the second round by Georgetown 92–62 on March 7, 1996.
