= 1995–96 St. John's Red Storm men's basketball team =

American college basketball season

1995–1996 St. John's Red Storm men's basketball
- Conference: Big East Conference (1979–2013)
- Record: 11–16 (5–13 Big East)
- Head coach: Brian Mahoney
- Assistant coaches: Al LoBalbo; Ron Rutledge
- Home arena: Alumni Hall; Madison Square Garden

1995–96 Big East men's basketball standings
| | Conf. | | | | Overall |
| Team | W | | L | PCT | W | | L | PCT |
|---|---|---|---|---|---|---|---|---|
Big East 6
| No. 3 Connecticut†* | 17 | – | 1 | .944 | 30 | – | 2 | .938 |
| No. 10 Villanova | 14 | – | 4 | .778 | 26 | – | 7 | .788 |
| Boston College | 10 | – | 8 | .556 | 19 | – | 11 | .633 |
| West Virginia | 7 | – | 11 | .389 | 12 | – | 15 | .444 |
| St. John's | 5 | – | 13 | .278 | 11 | – | 16 | .407 |
| Notre Dame | 4 | – | 14 | .222 | 9 | – | 18 | .333 |
Big East 7
| No. 4 Georgetown | 13 | – | 5 | .722 | 29 | – | 8 | .784 |
| No. 15 Syracuse | 12 | – | 6 | .667 | 29 | – | 9 | .763 |
| Providence | 9 | – | 9 | .500 | 18 | – | 12 | .600 |
| Miami | 8 | – | 10 | .444 | 15 | – | 13 | .536 |
| Seton Hall | 7 | – | 11 | .389 | 12 | – | 16 | .429 |
| Rutgers | 6 | – | 12 | .333 | 9 | – | 18 | .333 |
| Pittsburgh | 5 | – | 13 | .278 | 10 | – | 17 | .370 |
† 1996 Big East tournament winner As of April 1, 1996; *Connecticut's three NCAA Tournament games were vacated due to sanctions against the program; Connecticut′s disputed record was 32–3, 17–1. Rankings from AP Poll

The 1995–96 St. John's Red Storm men's basketball team represented St. John's University during the 1995–96 NCAA Division I men's basketball season. The team was coached by Brian Mahoney in his fourth year at the school. St. John's home games are played at Alumni Hall and Madison Square Garden and the team is a member of the Big East Conference.

== Off season ==
=== Departures ===
| Name | Number | Pos. | Height | Weight | Year | Hometown | Notes |
|---|---|---|---|---|---|---|---|
| Sergio Luyk | 3 | F | 6'7" | | RS Senior | | Graduated |
| James Scott | 32 | G | 6'6" | | Senior | | Graduated. Entered 1995 NBA draft |
| Roshown McLeod | 33 | F | 6'8" | | Sophomore | | Transferred. Duke |

=== Class of 1995 signees ===
College recruiting information
| Name | Hometown | School | Height | Weight | Commit date |
|---|---|---|---|---|---|
| Tyrone Grant; PF | Brooklyn, NY | Grady High School | 6 ft 7 in (2.01 m) | N/A | |
| Tyrone Grant; PF | Recruit ratings: No ratings found | | | | |
| Ed Brown; PF | Copiague, NY | Copiague High School | 6 ft 8 in (2.03 m) | N/A | |
| Ed Brown; PF | Recruit ratings: No ratings found | | | | |
| Mike Menniefield; PF | Greenville, SC | Spartanburg Methodist College | 6 ft 8 in (2.03 m) | N/A | |
| Mike Menniefield; PF | Recruit ratings: No ratings found | | | | |
Overall recruit ranking:
Note: In many cases, Scout, Rivals, 247Sports, On3, and ESPN may conflict in their listings of height and weight.; In these cases, the average was taken. ESPN grades are on a 100-point scale.; Sources: "1995 Team Ranking". Rivals.

== Roster ==
1995–96 St. John's Red Storm men's basketball team
Players
Coaches

| Pos. | # | Name | Height | Weight | Year | Previous school | Hometown |
|---|---|---|---|---|---|---|---|
| G | 4 | Tarik Turner | 6 ft 5 in (1.96 m) | — | So | Oak Hill | Charlottesville, VA |
| G | 5 | Maurice Brown | 5 ft 9 in (1.75 m) | — | Sr | William E. Grady | Brooklyn, NY |
| G | 13 | Felipe López | 6 ft 5 in (1.96 m) | — | So | Rice | Santo Domingo, D.R. |
| F | 14 | Ed Brown | 6 ft 8 in (2.03 m) | — | Fr | Copiague | Copiague, NY |
| F/C | 21 | Mike Menniefield | 6 ft 8 in (2.03 m) | — | Jr | Southside/Spartanburg Methodist | Greenville, SC |
| F | 22 | Thomas Bayne | 6 ft 10 in (2.08 m) | — | Sr | Brentwood | Brentwood, NY |
| G | 23 | Derek Brown | 6 ft 3 in (1.91 m) | — | RS Sr | H. Frank Carey | Franklin Square, NY |
| G | 24 | Rowan Barrett | 6 ft 5 in (1.96 m) | — | Sr | West Hill | Scarborough, Ontario |
| C | 31 | Zendon Hamilton | 6 ft 9 in (2.06 m) | — | So | Sewanhaka | Floral Park, NY |
| F | 32 | Tyrone Grant | 6 ft 7 in (2.01 m) | — | Fr | Grady | Brooklyn, NY |
| F | 34 | Charles Minlend (redshirt) | 6 ft 6 in (1.98 m) | — | Sr | St. Thomas More | Cameroon, Africa |
| G/F | 44 | Fred Lyson | 6 ft 7 in (2.01 m) | — | RS Jr | Oceanside | Oceanside, NY |

Head coach

- Brian Mahoney (Manhattan)

Assistant coach(es)

- Al LoBalbo
- Ron Rutledge

Legend

- (C) Team captain
- (S) Suspended
- (I) Ineligible
- (W) Walk-on
- Injured
- Current redshirt

== Schedule and results ==
| Date time, TV | Rank^{#} | Opponent^{#} | Result | Record | Site city, state |
Regular season
| 11/24/95* | | Niagara; Lapchick Tournament Opening Round | W 88-72 | 1-0 | Alumni Hall; Queens, NY |
| 11/25/95* | | California-Irvine; Lapchick Tournament Championship | L 77-83 | 1-1 | Alumni Hall; Queens, NY |
| 11/28/95* | | Manhattan | W 71-68 | 2-1 | Alumni Hall; Queens, NY |
| 12/02/95 | | at No. 3 Villanova | L 68-83 | 2–2 (0–1) | du Pont Pavilion; Villanova, PA |
| 12/05/95 | | at Syracuse | L 72-97 | 2-3 (0-2) | Carrier Dome; Syracuse, NY |
| 12/09/95* | | at San Francisco | W 80-78 | 3-3 | War Memorial Gymnasium; San Francisco, CA |
| 12/23/95* | | at Fordham | W 66-47 | 4-3 | Rose Hill Gymnasium; Bronx, NY |
| 12/27/95* | | Iona; ECAC Holiday Festival Semifinal | L 57-70 | 4-4 | Madison Square Garden; New York, NY |
| 12/28/95* | | Rider; ECAC Holiday Festival Consolation | W 79-69 | 5-4 | Madison Square Garden; New York, NY |
| 01/06/96 | | Providence | L 78-82 | 5-5 (0-3) | Alumni Hall; Queens, NY |
| 01/10/96 | | West Virginia | W 89-74 | 6-5 (1-3) | Alumni Hall; Queens, NY |
| 01/13/96* | | Louisville | W 86-64 | 7-5 | Madison Square Garden; New York, NY |
| 01/17/96 | | at No. 5 Connecticut | L 73-88 | 7-6 (1-4) | Hartford Civic Center; Hartford, CT |
| 01/20/96 | | at No. 24 Boston College | L 78-91 | 7-7 (1-5) | Silvio O. Conte Forum; Chestnut Hill, MA |
| 01/22/96 | | at Seton Hall | L 76-82 | 7-8 (1-6) | Continental Airlines Arena; East Rutherford, NJ |
| 01/27/96 | | No. 6 Georgetown | W 83-72 | 8-8 (2-6) | Madison Square Garden; New York, NY |
| 01/31/96 | | Notre Dame | L 83-86 | 8-9 (2-7) | Madison Square Garden; New York, NY |
| 02/03/96 | | No. 4 Connecticut | L 63-77 | 8-10 (2-8) | Madison Square Garden; Queens, NY |
| 02/07/96 | | No. 22 Boston College | L 73-89 | 8-11 (2-9) | Alumni Hall; Queens, NY |
| 02/11/96 | | at Notre Dame | W 74-66 | 9-11 (3-9) | Edmund P. Joyce Center; South Bend, IN |
| 02/15/96 | | Rutgers | L 70-82 | 9-12 (3-10) | Louis Brown Athletic Center; Piscataway, NJ |
| 02/17/96 | | Seton Hall | W 78-73 | 10-12 (4-10) | Madison Square Garden; New York, NY |
| 02/20/96 | | at Miami (F.L.) | L 91-96 ^{2OT} | 10-13 (4-11) | Miami Arena; Miami, FL |
| 02/24/96 | | at West Virginia | L 77-92 | 10-14 (4-12) | WVU Coliseum; Morgantown, WV |
| 02/26/96 | | No. 15 Syracuse | L 79-92 | 10-15 (4-13) | Madison Square Garden; New York, NY |
| 03/03/96 | | at Pittsburgh | W 74-68 | 11-15 (5-13) | Fitzgerald Field House; Pittsburgh, PA |
Big East tournament
| 03/06/96 | | vs. Providence; Big East tournament first round | L 72-80 | 11-16 (5-13) | Madison Square Garden; New York, NY |
*Non-conference game. ^{#}Rankings from AP Poll. (#) Tournament seedings in parentheses.
