= 1995–96 Syracuse Orangemen basketball team =

American college basketball season

1995–96 Syracuse Orangemen men's basketball

NCAA tournament, Runner-up

National Championship Game, L 67–76 vs. Kentucky
- Conference: Big East Conference

Ranking
- Coaches: No. 3
- AP: No. 15
- Record: 29–9 (12–6 Big East)
- Head coach: Jim Boeheim (20th season)
- Assistant coaches: Bernie Fine (20th season); Wayne Morgan (12th season); Mike Hopkins (1st season)
- Home arena: Carrier Dome

1995–96 Big East men's basketball standings
| | Conf. | | | | Overall |
| Team | W | | L | PCT | W | | L | PCT |
|---|---|---|---|---|---|---|---|---|
Big East 6
| No. 3 Connecticut†* | 17 | – | 1 | .944 | 30 | – | 2 | .938 |
| No. 10 Villanova | 14 | – | 4 | .778 | 26 | – | 7 | .788 |
| Boston College | 10 | – | 8 | .556 | 19 | – | 11 | .633 |
| West Virginia | 7 | – | 11 | .389 | 12 | – | 15 | .444 |
| St. John's | 5 | – | 13 | .278 | 11 | – | 16 | .407 |
| Notre Dame | 4 | – | 14 | .222 | 9 | – | 18 | .333 |
Big East 7
| No. 4 Georgetown | 13 | – | 5 | .722 | 29 | – | 8 | .784 |
| No. 15 Syracuse | 12 | – | 6 | .667 | 29 | – | 9 | .763 |
| Providence | 9 | – | 9 | .500 | 18 | – | 12 | .600 |
| Miami | 8 | – | 10 | .444 | 15 | – | 13 | .536 |
| Seton Hall | 7 | – | 11 | .389 | 12 | – | 16 | .429 |
| Rutgers | 6 | – | 12 | .333 | 9 | – | 18 | .333 |
| Pittsburgh | 5 | – | 13 | .278 | 10 | – | 17 | .370 |
† 1996 Big East tournament winner As of April 1, 1996; *Connecticut's three NCAA Tournament games were vacated due to sanctions against the program; Connecticut′s disputed record was 32–3, 17–1. Rankings from AP Poll

The 1995–96 Syracuse Orangemen basketball team represented Syracuse University as a member of the Big East Conference. The head coach was Jim Boeheim, serving for his 20th year. The team played its home games at the Carrier Dome in Syracuse, New York. The team finished with a 29–9 (12–6) record, while making it to the Championship Game of the NCAA tournament.

The team was led by seniors John Wallace and Lazarus Sims. Fellow senior J.B. Reafsnyder, juniors Jason Cipolla and Otis Hill, sophomore Todd Burgan and Marius Janulis played key roles. Walk-on and future NFL star Donovan McNabb also appeared in five games.

== Season recap ==
Syracuse was aided by the return of John Wallace, who had declared for the NBA draft, but chose to withdraw his early entry. Wallace would lead Syracuse in scoring for 30-of-38 games, leading Syracuse to an early 11–0 record.

With the Orangemen hitting a bump in mid-season losing five of eight Big East games, Boeheim chose to insert Jason Cipolla into the starting lineup in favor of Marius Janulis. The move worked as Syracuse would go 8–1 to finish the regular season with a record of 22–7. Syracuse would advance to the Big East tournament semifinals, where it was knocked off by Connecticut, 85–67.

Syracuse was named a No. 4 seed for the tournament, and played one of its most memorable games in the Sweet 16 against Georgia. Cipolla hit a jumper as time expired in regulation to send the game to overtime, and John Wallace sealed the victory with a 3-pointer with 2 seconds remaining to propel Syracuse to an 83–81 win. Wallace finished with 30 points and 15 rebounds in that game.

Syracuse would knock off the Paul Pierce, Raef LaFrentz and Jacque Vaughn-led Kansas in the Elite 8, and Erick Dampier and the Mississippi State Bulldogs in the national semifinal game. This set up a matchup between Jim Boeheim and former assistant Rick Pitino, who was now head coach of the Kentucky Wildcats in the National Championship game.

Syracuse, a heavy underdog, nearly overcame a 13-point second-half deficit, closing to within 2, but Kentucky held on for a 76–67 victory. Kentucky featured a deep team, including future NBA players Derek Anderson, Antoine Walker, Tony Delk and Ron Mercer.

== Roster ==
- John Wallace (22.2 points, 8.7 rebounds)
- Jason Cipolla (7.7 points, 2.0 rebounds)
- Lazarus Sims (6.3 points, 7.4 assists)
- Todd Burgan (12.1 points, 6.8 rebounds)
- Otis Hill (12.7 points, 5.5 rebounds)
- Marius Janulis (6.1 points, 2.1 rebounds)
- J. B. Reafsnyder (5.5 points, 3.4 rebounds)
- Donovan McNabb (2.3 points, 1.1 rebounds)

== Schedule and results ==
| Date time, TV | Rank^{#} | Opponent^{#} | Result | Record | Site city, state |
Regular Season
| Nov 25, 1995* | | Lafayette | W 87–63 | 1–0 | Carrier Dome; Syracuse, New York |
| Nov 28, 1995* | | Colgate | W 89–55 | 2–0 | Carrier Dome; Syracuse, New York |
| Dec 3, 1995 | | at Providence | W 82–78 | 3–0 (1–0) | Dunkin' Donuts Center; Providence, Rhode Island |
| Dec 5, 1995 | | St. John's | W 97–72 | 4–0 (2–0) | Carrier Dome; Syracuse, New York |
| Dec 8, 1995* | | Columbia | W 83–60 | 5–0 | Carrier Dome; Syracuse, New York |
| Dec 9, 1995* | | Washington State | W 77–75 | 6–0 | Carrier Dome; Syracuse, New York |
| Dec 13, 1995* | No. 25 | Bowling Green State | W 75–64 | 7–0 | Carrier Dome; Syracuse, New York |
| Dec 16, 1995* | No. 25 | College of Charleston | W 72–61 | 8–0 | Carrier Dome; Syracuse, New York |
| Dec 23, 1995* | No. 19 | at No. 3 Arizona | W 79–70 | 9–0 | McKale Center; Tucson, Arizona |
| Dec 27, 1995* | No. 13 | vs. No. 12 Illinois; Rainbow Classic | W 75–64 | 10–0 | Stan Sheriff Center; Honolulu, Hawaii |
| Dec 28, 1995* | No. 13 | vs. Rhode Island; Rainbow Classic | W 92–66 | 11–0 | Stan Sheriff Center; Honolulu, Hawaii |
| Dec 29, 1995* | No. 13 | vs. No. 1 UMass; Rainbow Classic | L 47–65 | 11–1 | Stan Sheriff Center; Honolulu, Hawaii |
| Jan 3, 1996 | No. 11 | at Miami (FL) | L 66–75 | 11–2 (2–1) | Miami Arena; Miami, Florida |
| Jan 10, 1996 | No. 14 | Providence | W 77–75 | 12–2 (3–1) | Carrier Dome; Syracuse, New York |
| Jan 14, 1996 | No. 14 | Rutgers | W 81–80 | 13–2 (4–1) | Carrier Dome; Syracuse, New York |
| Jan 16, 1996 | No. 12 | at West Virginia | L 78–90 | 13–3 (4–2) | WVU Coliseum; Morgantown, West Virginia |
| Jan 21, 1996 | No. 12 | at No. 5 Connecticut | L 70–79 | 13–4 (4–3) | Harry A. Gampel Pavilion; Storrs, Connecticut |
| Jan 24, 1996 | No. 17 | at No. 6 Georgetown; Rivalry | L 64–83 | 13–5 (4–4) | Capital Centre; Washington, D.C. |
| Jan 27, 1996 | No. 17 | No. 20 Boston College | W 88–73 | 14–5 (5–4) | Carrier Dome; Syracuse, New York |
| Jan 29, 1996* | No. 18 | No. 6 Villanova | L 69–72 ^{OT} | 14–6 (5–5) | Carrier Dome; Syracuse, New York |
| Feb 1, 1996* | No. 18 | Miami (FL) | W 72–51 | 15–6 (6–5) | Carrier Dome; Syracuse, New York |
| Feb 4, 1996* | No. 18 | Alabama | W 81–68 | 16–6 | Carrier Dome; Syracuse, New York |
| Feb 7, 1996 | No. 18 | at Pittsburgh | W 73–67 | 17–6 (7–5) | Fitzgerald Fieldhouse; Pittsburgh, Pennsylvania |
| Feb 10, 1996* | No. 18 | No. 8 Georgetown; Rivalry | W 85–64 | 18–6 (8–5) | Carrier Dome; Syracuse, New York |
| Feb 12, 1996 | No. 16 | at Rutgers | W 63–54 | 19–6 (9–5) | Louis Brown Athletic Center; Piscataway, New Jersey |
| Feb 20, 1996 | No. 15 | at Seton Hall | L 79–80 | 19–7 (9–6) | Continental Airlines Arena; East Rutherford, New Jersey |
| Feb 24, 1996 | No. 15 | Pittsburgh | W 77–60 | 20–7 (10–6) | Carrier Dome; Syracuse, New York |
| Feb 26, 1996 | No. 15 | at St. John's | W 92–79 | 21–7 (11–6) | Madison Square Garden; New York, New York |
| Mar 2, 1996 | No. 15 | Notre Dame | W 71–67 | 22–7 (12–6) | Carrier Dome; Syracuse, New York |
Big East tournament
| Mar 6, 1996* | No. 13 | vs. Notre Dame; First round | W 76–55 | 23–7 | Madison Square Garden; New York, New York |
| Mar 7, 1996* | No. 13 | vs. Boston College; Quarterfinals | W 69–61 | 24–7 | Madison Square Garden; New York, New York |
| Mar 8, 1996* | No. 13 | vs. No. 3 Connecticut; Semifinals | L 67–85 | 24–8 | Madison Square Garden; New York, New York |
NCAA tournament
| Mar 14, 1996* | (4 W) No. 15 | vs. (13 W) Montana State; First round | W 88–55 | 25–8 | The Pit; Albuquerque, New Mexico |
| Mar 16, 1996* | (4 W) No. 15 | vs. (12 W) Drexel; Second Round | W 69–58 | 26–8 | The Pit; Albuquerque, New Mexico |
| Mar 22, 1996* | (4 W) No. 15 | vs. (8 W) Georgia; West Regional semifinal – Sweet Sixteen | W 83–81 ^{OT} | 27–8 | McNichols Sports Arena; Denver, Colorado |
| Mar 24, 1996* | (4 W) No. 15 | vs. (2 W) No. 4 Kansas; West Regional Final – Elite Eight | W 60–57 | 28–8 | McNichols Sports Arena; Denver, Colorado |
| Mar 30, 1996* | (4 W) No. 15 | vs. (5 SE) No. 19 Mississippi State; National semifinal – Final Four | W 77–69 | 29–8 | Continental Airlines Arena; East Rutherford, New Jersey |
| Apr 1, 1996* | (4 W) No. 15 | vs. (1 MW) No. 2 Kentucky; National Championship Game | L 67–76 | 29–9 | Continental Airlines Arena; East Rutherford, New Jersey |
*Non-conference game. ^{#}Rankings from AP poll. (#) Tournament seedings in parentheses. W=West.

== Rankings ==
Ranking movements Legend: ██ Increase in ranking ██ Decrease in ranking — = Not ranked
| | Week | | | | | | | | | | | | | | | | | | |
| Poll | Pre | 1 | 2 | 3 | 4 | 5 | 6 | 7 | 8 | 9 | 10 | 11 | 12 | 13 | 14 | 15 | 16 | 17 | Final |
|---|---|---|---|---|---|---|---|---|---|---|---|---|---|---|---|---|---|---|---|
| AP | — | — | — | — | 25 | 19 | 13 | 11 | 14 | 12 | 17 | 18 | 18 | 16 | 15 | 15 | 13 | 15 | Not released |
| Coaches | — | — | — | — | — | 22 | 14 | 12 | 14 | 12 | 13 | 16 | 18 | 16 | 16 | 14 | 13 | 14 | 3 |
