= 1995 Maui Invitational =

College basketball tournament

1995 Maui Invitational Tournament
- Season: 1995–96
- Teams: 8
- Finals site: Lahaina Civic Center; Maui, Hawaii
- Champions: Villanova (1st title)
- Runner-up: North Carolina (2nd title game)
- Semifinalists: Santa Clara; Michigan State
- Winning coach: Steve Lappas (1st title)
- MVP: Kerry Kittles (Villanova)

The 1995 Maui Invitational Tournament was an early-season college basketball tournament that was played, for the 12th time, from November 20 to November 22, 1995. The tournament, which began in 1984, was part of the 1995-96 NCAA Division I men's basketball season. The tournament was played at the Lahaina Civic Center in Maui, Hawaii and was won by the Villanova Wildcats. It was the first title for both the program and for its head coach Steve Lappas.

== Bracket ==
5th place game November 22
Vanderbilt	75
4	UCLA	71
7th place game
Chaminade	66
Wisconsin	104

Consolation 2nd Round; November 21
Chaminade	71
Vanderbilt	96
4	UCLA	68
Wisconsin	57

First Round; November 20
Chaminade	66
Michigan State	69
Vanderbilt	63
20	North Carolina	71
4	UCLA	69
Santa Clara	78
3	Villanova	66
Wisconsin	58

Semifinals; November 21
Michigan State	70
20	North Carolina	92
Santa Clara	65
3	Villanova	77

Championship; November 22
20	North Carolina	75
3	Villanova	77
3rd place game
Michigan State	71
Santa Clara	77
