= 1995–96 Notre Dame Fighting Irish men's basketball team =

American college basketball season

1995–96 Notre Dame Fighting Irish men's basketball
- Conference: Big East Conference (1979–2013)
- Record: 9–18 (4–14 Big East)
- Head coach: John MacLeod (5th season)
- Home arena: Joyce Center

1995–96 Big East men's basketball standings
	Conf.				Overall
Team	W		L	PCT	W		L	PCT
Big East 6
No. 3 Connecticut†*	17	–	1	.944	30	–	2	.938
No. 10 Villanova	14	–	4	.778	26	–	7	.788
Boston College	10	–	8	.556	19	–	11	.633
West Virginia	7	–	11	.389	12	–	15	.444
St. John's	5	–	13	.278	11	–	16	.407
Notre Dame	4	–	14	.222	9	–	18	.333
Big East 7
No. 4 Georgetown	13	–	5	.722	29	–	8	.784
No. 15 Syracuse	12	–	6	.667	29	–	9	.763
Providence	9	–	9	.500	18	–	12	.600
Miami	8	–	10	.444	15	–	13	.536
Seton Hall	7	–	11	.389	12	–	16	.429
Rutgers	6	–	12	.333	9	–	18	.333
Pittsburgh	5	–	13	.278	10	–	17	.370
† 1996 Big East tournament winner As of April 1, 1996; *Connecticut's three NCAA Tournament games were vacated due to sanctions against the program; Connecticut′s disputed record was 32–3, 17–1. Rankings from AP Poll

The 1995–96 Notre Dame Fighting Irish men's basketball team represented the University of Notre Dame during the 1995–96 NCAA Division I men's basketball season.

== Schedule ==
Date time, TV	Rank^{#}	Opponent^{#}	Result	Record	Site city, state
November 25*		Akron	W 65–54	1–0	Joyce Center; Notre Dame, IN
November 28*		at Indiana	L 53–73	1–1	Assembly Hall; Bloomington, Indiana
December 2		at Rutgers	L 80–86	1–2 (0–1)	Louis Brown Athletic Center; Piscataway, NJ
December 6		Connecticut	L 65–85	1–3 (0–2)	Joyce Center; Notre Dame, IN
December 9*		at Loyola (MD)	W 70–62	2–3 (0–2)	Reitz Arena; Baltimore, Maryland
December 20*		UCLA	L 58–83	2–4 (0–2)	Joyce Center; Notre Dame, IN
December 23*		at Xavier	W 72–70	3–4 (0–2)	Cincinnati Gardens; Cincinnati, Ohio
December 28*		San Diego	W 90–63	4–4 (0–2)	Joyce Center; Notre Dame, IN
December 30*		Loyola Marymount	W 84–51	5–4 (0–2)	Joyce Center; Notre Dame, IN
January 2		at Villanova	L 57–76	5–5 (0–3)	The Pavilion; Delaware County, Pennsylvania
January 9		at Boston College	L 57–72	5–6 (0–4)	Conte Forum; Boston, Massachusetts
January 13		at Pittsburgh	L 65–75	5–7 (0–5)	Fitzgerald Field House; Pittsburgh, Pennsylvania
January 15		Georgetown	L 69–74	5–8 (0–6)	Joyce Center; Notre Dame, IN
January 20		Rutgers	W 79–67	6–8 (1–6)	Joyce Center; Notre Dame, IN
January 23		at Miami (FL)	L 64–72	6–9 (1–7)	Miami Arena; Miami, Florida
January 27		West Virginia	L 59–69	6–10 (1–8)	Joyce Center; Notre Dame, IN
January 31		at St. John's	W 86–83	7–10 (2–8)	Madison Square Garden; New York
February 3		Georgetown	L 53–70	7–11 (2–9)	Joyce Center; Notre Dame, IN
February 6*		vs. Manhattan	L 44–65	7–12 (2–9)	Madison Square Garden; New York
February 11		St. John's	L 66–74	7–13 (2–10)	Joyce Center; Notre Dame, IN
February 13		Pittsburgh	W 77–69	8–13 (3–10)	Joyce Center; Notre Dame, IN
February 17		at No. 3 Connecticut	L 65–85	8–14 (3–11)	Harry A. Gampel Pavilion; Storrs, Connecticut
February 21		Providence	L 72–73	8–15 (3–12)	Joyce Center; Notre Dame, IN
February 24		Seton Hall	W 72–60	9–15 (4–12)	Joyce Center; Notre Dame, IN
February 28		Miami (FL)	L 59–71	9–16 (4–13)	Joyce Center; Notre Dame, IN
March 2		at No. 15 Syracuse	L 67–71	9–17 (4–14)	Carrier Dome; Syracuse, NY
Big East tournament
March 6		vs. No. 13 Syracuse; First Round	L 55–76	9–18 (4–15)	Madison Square Garden; New York
*Non-conference game. ^{#}Rankings from AP Poll. (#) Tournament seedings in parentheses.
