= 1995–96 Connecticut Huskies men's basketball team =

American college basketball season

1995–96 Connecticut Huskies men's basketball

Big East 6 Division Regular Season Champions Big East tournament champions

NCAA men's Division I tournament, Sweet Sixteen
- Conference: Big East Conference

Ranking
- Coaches: No. 8
- AP: No. 3
- Record: 30–2 (2 wins, 1 loss vacated) (17–1 Big East)
- Head coach: Jim Calhoun (10th season)
- Assistant coaches: Howie Dickenman; Karl Hobbs; Tom Moore
- Home arena: Hartford Civic Center; Harry A. Gampel Pavilion

1995–96 Big East men's basketball standings
	Conf.				Overall
Team	W		L	PCT	W		L	PCT
Big East 6
No. 3 Connecticut†*	17	–	1	.944	30	–	2	.938
No. 10 Villanova	14	–	4	.778	26	–	7	.788
Boston College	10	–	8	.556	19	–	11	.633
West Virginia	7	–	11	.389	12	–	15	.444
St. John's	5	–	13	.278	11	–	16	.407
Notre Dame	4	–	14	.222	9	–	18	.333
Big East 7
No. 4 Georgetown	13	–	5	.722	29	–	8	.784
No. 15 Syracuse	12	–	6	.667	29	–	9	.763
Providence	9	–	9	.500	18	–	12	.600
Miami	8	–	10	.444	15	–	13	.536
Seton Hall	7	–	11	.389	12	–	16	.429
Rutgers	6	–	12	.333	9	–	18	.333
Pittsburgh	5	–	13	.278	10	–	17	.370
† 1996 Big East tournament winner As of April 1, 1996; *Connecticut's three NCAA Tournament games were vacated due to sanctions against the program; Connecticut′s disputed record was 32–3, 17–1. Rankings from AP Poll

The 1995–96 Connecticut Huskies men's basketball team represented the University of Connecticut in the 1995–96 NCAA Division I men's basketball season. The Huskies completed the season with a 30–2 overall record. The Huskies were members of the Big East Conference where they finished with a 17–1 record and were the regular-season champions and the 1996 Big East men's basketball tournament champions. UConn made it to the Sweet Sixteen of the 1996 NCAA Division I men's basketball tournament but lost to Mississippi State 60–55.

UConn later had two postseason wins vacated by the NCAA. The Huskies played their home games at Harry A. Gampel Pavilion in Storrs, Connecticut and the Hartford Civic Center in Hartford, Connecticut, and they were led by tenth-year head coach Jim Calhoun.

== Schedule ==
Date time, TV	Rank^{#}	Opponent^{#}	Result	Record	Site (attendance) city, state
Regular Season
11/22/1995*; ESPN2	No. 6	vs. TCU; Great Alaska Shootout	W 102–76	1–0	Sullivan Arena (7,863); Anchorage, AK
11/24/1995*	No. 6	vs. No. 10 Iowa; Great Alaska Shootout	L 95–101 ^{OT}	1–1	Sullivan Arena (7,863); Anchorage, AK
11/25/1995*	No. 6	vs. Indiana; Great Alaska Shootout	W 86–52	2–1	Sullivan Arena (7,863); Anchorage, AK
11/29/1995*; WTNH	No. 9	Northeastern	W 86–59	3–1	Hartford Civic Center (15,522); Hartford, Connecticut
12/3/1995; WTNH	No. 9	Boston College	W 63–62	4–1 (1–0)	Hartford Civic Center (16,294); Hartford, Connecticut
12/6/1995; WTNH	No. 9	at Notre Dame	W 85–65	5–1 (2–0)	Edmund P. Joyce Center (11,089); Notre Dame, Indiana
12/8/1995*; WTNH	No. 9	Yale	W 93–66	6–1	Hartford Civic Center (15,112); Hartford, Connecticut
12/12/1995*; ESPN	No. 8	at Florida State	W 79–61	7–1	Donald L. Tucker Civic Center (8,873); Tallahassee, Florida
12/23/1995*; WTNH	No. 8	Fairfield	W 86–52	8–1	Harry A. Gampel Pavilion (8,241); Storrs, Connecticut
12/27/1995*; WTNH	No. 7	at College of Charleston	W 77–60	9–1	John Kresse Arena (6,721); Charleston, South Carolina
12/30/1995*; WTNH	No. 7	Hartford	W 102–63	10–1	Hartford Civic Center (16,294); Hartford, Connecticut
1/3/1996; WTNH	No. 7	at West Virginia	W 89–79	11–1 (3–0)	WVU Coliseum (8,013); Morgantown, West Virginia
1/6/1996; WTNH	No. 7	Miami	W 73–52	12–1 (4–0)	Hartford Civic Center (16,294); Hartford, Connecticut
1/9/1996; ESPN	No. 6	No. 7 Villanova	W 81–73	13–1 (5–0)	Harry A. Gampel Pavilion (8,241); Storrs, Connecticut
1/13/1996; WTNH	No. 6	at Providence	W 83–74	14–1 (6–0)	Providence Civic Center (13,106); Providence, Rhode Island
1/17/1996; ESPN	No. 5	St. John's	W 88–73	15–1 (7–0)	Hartford Civic Center (16,294); Hartford, Connecticut
1/21/1996; CBS	No. 5	No. 12 Syracuse; Rivalry	W 79–70	16–1 (8–0)	Hartford Civic Center (16,294); Hartford, Connecticut
1/23/1996*; WTNH	No. 4	Central Connecticut	W 116–46	17–1	Hartford Civic Center (15,828); Hartford, Connecticut
1/25/1996; ESPN	No. 4	at Pittsburgh	W 69–63	18–1 (9–0)	Civic Arena (6,798); Pittsburgh
1/28/1996*; CBS	No. 4	Virginia	W 76–46	19–1	Hartford Civic Center (16,294); Hartford, Connecticut
1/31/1996; WTNH	No. 4	at Rutgers	W 77–59	20–1 (10–0)	Louis Brown Athletic Center (8,091); Piscataway, New Jersey
2/3/1996; WTNH	No. 4	at St. John's	W 77–63	21–1 (11–0)	Madison Square Garden (19,544); New York City
2/6/1996; ESPN	No. 4	Providence	W 99–77	22–1 (12–0)	Harry A. Gampel Pavilion (8,241); Storrs, Connecticut
2/14/1996; WTNH	No. 3	West Virginia	W 87–69	23–1 (13–0)	Harry A. Gampel Pavilion (8,241); Storrs, Connecticut
2/17/1996; NBC	No. 3	Notre Dame	W 85–65	24–1 (14–0)	Harry A. Gampel Pavilion (8,241); Storrs, Connecticut
2/19/1996; ESPN	No. 3	at No. 11 Georgetown; Rivalry	L 65–77	24–2 (14–1)	Capital Centre (19,035); Landover, Maryland
2/25/1996; CBS	No. 3	at Villanova	W 70–59	25–2 (15–1)	The Pavilion (18,524); Villanova, Pennsylvania
2/28/1996; WTNH	No. 4	Rutgers	W 78–66	26–2 (16–1)	Harry A. Gampel Pavilion (8,241); Storrs, Connecticut
3/2/1996; WTNH	No. 4	at Seton Hall	W 87–58	27–2 (17–1)	Brendan Byrne Arena (20,029); East Rutherford, New Jersey
Big East tournament
3/7/1996; ESPN	No. 3	vs. Seton Hall; Quarterfinals	W 79–58	28–2	Madison Square Garden (19,544); New York
3/8/1996; ESPN	No. 3	vs. No. 15 Syracuse; Semifinals/Rivalry	W 85–66	29–2	Madison Square Garden (19,544); New York
3/9/1996; ESPN	No. 3	vs. No. 4 Georgetown; Championship/Rivalry	W 75–74	30–2	Madison Square Garden (19,544); New York
NCAA tournament
3/14/1996*; CBS	No. 3 (1)	vs. No. (16) Colgate; First Round	W 68–59	Vacated	RCA Dome (31,373); Indianapolis
3/16/1996*; CBS	No. 3 (1)	vs. No. (9) Eastern Michigan; Second Round	W 95–81	Vacated	RCA Dome (32,293); Indianapolis
3/22/1996*; CBS	No. 3 (1)	vs. No. 19 (5) Mississippi State; Sweet Sixteen	L 55–60	Vacated	Rupp Arena (28,890); Lexington, Kentucky
*Non-conference game. ^{#}Rankings from AP Poll. (#) Tournament seedings in parentheses. All times are in Eastern Time.

Schedule Source:
