= 1995–96 Boston College Eagles men's basketball team =

American college basketball season

1995–96 Boston College Eagles men's basketball

NCAA tournament, Second round
- Conference: Big East Conference
- Big East 6
- Record: 19–11 (10–8 Big East)
- Head coach: Jim O'Brien (10th season)
- Home arena: Silvio O. Conte Forum

1995–96 Big East men's basketball standings
	Conf.				Overall
Team	W		L	PCT	W		L	PCT
Big East 6
No. 3 Connecticut†*	17	–	1	.944	30	–	2	.938
No. 10 Villanova	14	–	4	.778	26	–	7	.788
Boston College	10	–	8	.556	19	–	11	.633
West Virginia	7	–	11	.389	12	–	15	.444
St. John's	5	–	13	.278	11	–	16	.407
Notre Dame	4	–	14	.222	9	–	18	.333
Big East 7
No. 4 Georgetown	13	–	5	.722	29	–	8	.784
No. 15 Syracuse	12	–	6	.667	29	–	9	.763
Providence	9	–	9	.500	18	–	12	.600
Miami	8	–	10	.444	15	–	13	.536
Seton Hall	7	–	11	.389	12	–	16	.429
Rutgers	6	–	12	.333	9	–	18	.333
Pittsburgh	5	–	13	.278	10	–	17	.370
† 1996 Big East tournament winner As of April 1, 1996; *Connecticut's three NCAA Tournament games were vacated due to sanctions against the program; Connecticut′s disputed record was 32–3, 17–1. Rankings from AP Poll

The 1995–96 Boston College Eagles men's basketball team represented Boston College as members of the Big East Conference during the 1995–96 NCAA Division I men's basketball season. The team was led by 10th-year head coach Jim O'Brien and played their home games at the Silvio O. Conte Forum in Boston, Massachusetts.

After finishing third in the Big East 6 Division regular season standings, the Eagles split a pair of games in the Big East tournament to receive an at-large bid to the NCAA tournament as No. 11 seed in the Southeast region. After defeating the No. 6 seed Indiana in the opening round, the Eagles were eliminated by Georgia Tech, 103–89, in the round of 32.

== Roster ==
1995–96 Boston College Eagles men's basketball team
Players
Coaches

Pos.	#	Name	Height	Weight	Year	Hometown
G	11	Scoonie Penn	5 ft 11 in (1.8 m)	180 lb (82 kg)	Fr	Salem, Massachusetts
C	14	Mickey Curley	6 ft 9 in (2.06 m)	—	So	Duxbury, Massachusetts
G	20	Duane Woodward	6 ft 3 in (1.91 m)	200 lb (91 kg)	So	New York, New York
F	24	Danya Abrams	6 ft 7 in (2.01 m)	240 lb (109 kg)	Jr	Westchester, New York

Head coach

- Jim O'Brien (Boston College)

Assistant coach(es)

Legend

- (C) Team captain
- (S) Suspended
- (I) Ineligible
- (W) Walk-on
- Injured
- Current redshirt

Roster

== Schedule and results ==
Date time, TV	Rank^{#}	Opponent^{#}	Result	Record	Site (attendance) city, state
Regular season
Big East tournament
Mar 6, 1996*		vs. Pittsburgh	W 70–66	18–9	Madison Square Garden; New York, New York
Mar 7, 1996*		vs. No. 13 Syracuse	L 61–69	18–10	Madison Square Garden; New York, New York
NCAA Tournament
Mar 15, 1996*	(11 SE)	vs. (6 SE) Indiana; First Round	W 64–51	19–10	Orlando Arena; Orlando, Florida
Mar 17, 1996*	(11 SE)	vs. (3 SE) No. 13 Georgia Tech; Second Round	L 89–103	19–11	Orlando Arena; Orlando, Florida
*Non-conference game. ^{#}Rankings from AP poll. (#) Tournament seedings in parentheses.
