= 1996 Big East men's basketball tournament =

- Classification: Division I
- Season: 1995–96
- Teams: 13
- Site: Madison Square Garden; New York City
- Champions: Connecticut (2nd title)
- Winning coach: Jim Calhoun (2nd title)
- MVP: Victor Page (Georgetown)

1995–96 Big East men's basketball standings
	Conf.				Overall
Team	W		L	PCT	W		L	PCT
Big East 6
No. 3 Connecticut†*	17	–	1	.944	30	–	2	.938
No. 10 Villanova	14	–	4	.778	26	–	7	.788
Boston College	10	–	8	.556	19	–	11	.633
West Virginia	7	–	11	.389	12	–	15	.444
St. John's	5	–	13	.278	11	–	16	.407
Notre Dame	4	–	14	.222	9	–	18	.333
Big East 7
No. 4 Georgetown	13	–	5	.722	29	–	8	.784
No. 15 Syracuse	12	–	6	.667	29	–	9	.763
Providence	9	–	9	.500	18	–	12	.600
Miami	8	–	10	.444	15	–	13	.536
Seton Hall	7	–	11	.389	12	–	16	.429
Rutgers	6	–	12	.333	9	–	18	.333
Pittsburgh	5	–	13	.278	10	–	17	.370
† 1996 Big East tournament winner As of April 1, 1996; *Connecticut's three NCAA Tournament games were vacated due to sanctions against the program; Connecticut′s disputed record was 32–3, 17–1. Rankings from AP Poll

The 1996 Big East men's basketball tournament took place at Madison Square Garden in New York City. Its winner received the Big East Conference's automatic bid to the 1996 NCAA tournament. It is a single-elimination tournament with four rounds and the three highest seeds received byes in the first round. Connecticut, the Big East regular season winner, received the number one seed in the tournament.

In one of the greatest finals in tournament history, Connecticut defeated Georgetown, 75–74 to claim its second Big East tournament championship.

== Bracket ==
First round
8	West Virginia	78
9	Seton Hall	80
4	#13 Syracuse	76
13	Notre Dame	55
5	Boston College	70
12	Pittsburgh	66
6	Providence	80
11	St. John's	72
7	Miami	77
10	Rutgers	67

Second round
1	#3 Connecticut	79
9	Seton Hall	58
4	#13 Syracuse	69
5	Boston College	61
3	#9 Villanova	78
6	Providence	68
2	#6 Georgetown	92
7	Miami	62

Semifinals
1	#3 Connecticut	85
4	#13 Syracuse	67
3	#9 Villanova	76
2	#6 Georgetown	84

Championship Game
1	#3 Connecticut	75
2	#6 Georgetown	74

== Awards ==
Dave Gavitt Trophy (Most Outstanding Player): Victor Page, Georgetown

All-Tournament Team

- Ray Allen (Connecticut)
- Allen Iverson (Georgetown)
- Kerry Kittles (Villanova)
- Travis Knight (Connecticut)
- Victor Page (Georgetown)
- John Wallace (Syracuse)
