= 1995–96 Villanova Wildcats men's basketball team =

American college basketball season

1995–96 Villanova Wildcats men's basketball

Maui Invitational tournament champion

NCAA tournament, Round of 32
- Conference: Big East Conference

Ranking
- Coaches: No. 17
- AP: No. 10
- Record: 26–7 (14–4 Big East)
- Head coach: Steve Lappas (4th season)
- Home arena: The Pavilion (Capacity: 6,500)

1995–96 Big East men's basketball standings
	Conf.				Overall
Team	W		L	PCT	W		L	PCT
Big East 6
No. 3 Connecticut†*	17	–	1	.944	30	–	2	.938
No. 10 Villanova	14	–	4	.778	26	–	7	.788
Boston College	10	–	8	.556	19	–	11	.633
West Virginia	7	–	11	.389	12	–	15	.444
St. John's	5	–	13	.278	11	–	16	.407
Notre Dame	4	–	14	.222	9	–	18	.333
Big East 7
No. 4 Georgetown	13	–	5	.722	29	–	8	.784
No. 15 Syracuse	12	–	6	.667	29	–	9	.763
Providence	9	–	9	.500	18	–	12	.600
Miami	8	–	10	.444	15	–	13	.536
Seton Hall	7	–	11	.389	12	–	16	.429
Rutgers	6	–	12	.333	9	–	18	.333
Pittsburgh	5	–	13	.278	10	–	17	.370
† 1996 Big East tournament winner As of April 1, 1996; *Connecticut's three NCAA Tournament games were vacated due to sanctions against the program; Connecticut′s disputed record was 32–3, 17–1. Rankings from AP Poll

The 1995–96 Villanova Wildcats men's basketball team represented Villanova University in the 1995–96 season. Led by consensus First team All-American Senior Kerry Kittles, who became and remains Villanova's all-time leading scorer, the highly ranked Wildcats made their second appearance in the NCAA Tournament since the departure of Rollie Massimino. With an overall record 24-5 and conference record of 14–4, the Wildcats placed second in the Big East Conference, and after reaching the semifinals of the Big East tournament, the team was invited to the NCAA tournament as a 3 seed. In the NCAA tournament, the Wildcats would gain their first tournament win under Fourth Year head coach Steve Lappas, over 14 seed Portland. In the round of 32, the Wildcats would prove to be competitive, but fall to 6 seed Louisville by four points.

== Roster ==
1995–96 Villanova Wildcats men's basketball team
Players
Coaches

Pos.	#	Name	Height	Weight	Year	Hometown
G	13	John Celestand	6 ft 4 in (1.93 m)	175 lb (79 kg)	Fr	Piscataway, New Jersey
G	20	Alvin Williams	6 ft 5 in (1.96 m)	180 lb (82 kg)	Jr	Philadelphia, Pennsylvania
G	30	Kerry Kittles	6 ft 5 in (1.96 m)	175 lb (79 kg)	Sr	New Orleans, Louisiana
C	42	Jason Lawson	6 ft 11 in (2.11 m)	240 lb (109 kg)	Jr	Philadelphia, Pennsylvania

Head coach

- Steve Lappas

Assistant coach(es)

Legend

- (C) Team captain
- (S) Suspended
- (I) Ineligible
- (W) Walk-on
- Injured
- Current redshirt

== Schedule and results ==
Date time, TV	Rank^{#}	Opponent^{#}	Result	Record	Site city, state
Regular Season
Nov 20, 1995*	No. 3	vs. Wisconsin; Maui Invitational Tournament	W 66–58	1–0	Lahaina Civic Center; Lahaina, Hawaii
Nov 21, 1995*	No. 3	vs. Santa Clara; Maui Invitational Tournament	W 77–65	2–0	Lahaina Civic Center; Lahaina, Hawaii
Nov 22, 1995*	No. 3	vs. No. 20 North Carolina; Maui Invitational Tournament	W 77–75	3–0	Lahaina Civic Center; Lahaina, Hawaii
Nov 29, 1995*	No. 3	Bradley	W 70–63	4–0	The Pavilion; Philadelphia, Pennsylvania
Dec 2, 1995	No. 3	St. John's	W 83–68	5–0 (1–0)	The Pavilion; Philadelphia, Pennsylvania
Dec 5, 1995*	No. 2	at Miami (FL)	W 70–68	6–0	Miami Arena; Miami, Florida
Dec 9, 1995*	No. 2	vs. Purdue; Wooden Classic	W 67–50	7–0	Honda Center; Anaheim, California
Big East Tournament
Mar 7, 1996*	No. 9	vs. Providence; Quarterfinals	W 78–68	25–5	Madison Square Garden; New York, New York
Mar 8, 1996*	No. 9	vs. No. 6 Georgetown; Semifinals	L 76–84	25–6	Madison Square Garden; New York, New York
NCAA Tournament
Mar 15, 1996*	(3 MW) No. 10	vs. (14 MW) Portland; First round	W 92–58	26–6	Bradley Center; Milwaukee, Wisconsin
Mar 17, 1996*	(3 MW) No. 10	vs. (6 MW) No. 24 Louisville; Second round	L 64–68	26–7	Bradley Center; Milwaukee, Wisconsin
*Non-conference game. ^{#}Rankings from AP Poll. (#) Tournament seedings in parentheses. MW=Midwest.

=== Tournament results ===
Big East tournament
First Round vs. (7) Providence @ Madison Square Garden, New York, NY - W, 78-68
Semifinals vs. (3) Georgetown @ Madison Square Garden, New York, NY - L, 76-84
NCAA Tournament
First Round vs. (14) Portland @ Bradley Center, Milwaukee, WI - W, 92-58
Round of 32 vs. (6) Louisville @ Bradley Center, Milwaukee, WI - L, 68-64

== Team players in the 1996 NBA draft ==
Round	Pick	Player	NBA club
1	8	Kerry Kittles	New Jersey Nets
