= 1995–96 Georgetown Hoyas men's basketball team =

American college basketball season

1995–96 Georgetown Hoyas men's basketball

Big East 7 Division regular season champions

NCAA tournament, Elite Eight
- Conference: Big East Conference
- Big East 7 Division

Ranking
- Coaches: No. 7
- AP: No. 4
- Record: 29–8 (13–5 Big East)
- Head coach: John Thompson (24th season)
- Assistant coaches: Craig Esherick (14th season); Mike Riley (14th season); Mel Reid (6th season)
- Captains: Othella Harrington; Jerome Williams
- Home arena: USAir Arena

1995–96 Big East men's basketball standings
	Conf.				Overall
Team	W		L	PCT	W		L	PCT
Big East 6
No. 3 Connecticut†*	17	–	1	.944	30	–	2	.938
No. 10 Villanova	14	–	4	.778	26	–	7	.788
Boston College	10	–	8	.556	19	–	11	.633
West Virginia	7	–	11	.389	12	–	15	.444
St. John's	5	–	13	.278	11	–	16	.407
Notre Dame	4	–	14	.222	9	–	18	.333
Big East 7
No. 4 Georgetown	13	–	5	.722	29	–	8	.784
No. 15 Syracuse	12	–	6	.667	29	–	9	.763
Providence	9	–	9	.500	18	–	12	.600
Miami	8	–	10	.444	15	–	13	.536
Seton Hall	7	–	11	.389	12	–	16	.429
Rutgers	6	–	12	.333	9	–	18	.333
Pittsburgh	5	–	13	.278	10	–	17	.370
† 1996 Big East tournament winner As of April 1, 1996; *Connecticut's three NCAA Tournament games were vacated due to sanctions against the program; Connecticut′s disputed record was 32–3, 17–1. Rankings from AP Poll

The 1995–96 Georgetown Hoyas men's basketball team represented Georgetown University in the 1995–96 NCAA Division I college basketball season. John Thompson, coached them in his 24th season as head coach. They played their home games at USAir Arena in Landover, Maryland. They were members of the Big East 7 Division of the Big East Conference, were the regular-season champions of the Big East 7 Division, and finished the season with a record of 29–8, 13–5 in Big East play. Their record earned them a bye in the first round of the 1996 Big East men's basketball tournament, and they advanced to the tournament final before losing to Connecticut. They were awarded a No. 2 seed in the East Regional of the 1996 NCAA Division I men's basketball tournament – Georgetown's 17th NCAA Tournament appearance in 18 years – and advanced to the East Regional Final before losing to No. 1 seed Massachusetts. They were ranked No. 4 in the season's final Associated Press Poll and No. 7 in the postseason Coaches' Poll.

== Season recap ==
This was the Big East's first season in which it organized its teams into divisions; the two divisions were the Big East 6 and Big East 7 divisions. Georgetown would play as a member of the Big East 7 Division for three seasons before the conference scrapped its divisional structure after the end of the 1997-98 season. For its first year in the Big East 7 Division, Georgetown fielded a powerhouse team that included four future National Basketball Association (NBA) stars and began the season ranked fifth in the country.

Sophomore guard Allen Iverson led the team with a dominant season. The previous year, he had averaged 20.4 points per game despite shooting only 39 percent from the field, 23 percent from three-point range, and 19 percent in three-point shots during Big East play; this year he shot 48 percent from the field and 36.6 percent in three-pointers, with impressive results. In the second game of the year against Temple in the Preseason NIT, he shot 50 percent from the field, scored 24 points, and had a career-high 10 rebounds. In the tournament's third game four days later, he scored 23 points against 25th-ranked Georgia Tech, and two days after that he completed the tournament with a career-high 40-point game against 19th-ranked Arizona. In an early Big East game against Rutgers, he scored 21 points despite playing only 20 minutes. In the last 25 games of the season, Iverson led the team in scoring 21 times, including another 40-point game against Seton Hall, 39 against St. John's, 34 against Providence, and 30 against 23rd-ranked Memphis.

Senior center and team co-captain Othella Harrington had had a standout freshman year, but his production had declined over the previous two seasons as Georgetown began to emphasize uptempo guard play rather than feeding the ball to the "big man" at center, and his junior year had been his least successful. He recovered this season, with a shooting percentage from the field (55%) and free-throw line and an offensive rebound total (100) which all were more like those of his freshman year. He scored 25 points and had 12 rebounds against Duquesne, scored 23 at USAir Arena against 17th-ranked Syracuse – a team against which he averaged 17 points per game and three times scored 20 or more points during his four-year career – and had a 27-point, 10-rebound game against Memphis.

Freshman point guard Victor Page joined the Hoyas this season. One of the nation's top prospects, he played in all 37 games and started 33. In the first three games of the season, he scored a combined 71 points, including 25 in the Georgia Tech game. He averaged 12.5 points per game for the season. Senior forward and team co-captain Jerome Williams had another good year, averaging 10 points and 8.8 rebounds a game, shooting 58.8% from the field, and finishing second to Iverson in steals. He completed his two-year varsity career averaging 54.4 percent from the field. Sophomore center Jahidi White saw only limited action, but began to show his potential, including a 19-point, 11-rebound effort in only 17 minutes of play against Morgan State in December 1995.

Two days after beating Memphis, the Hoyas faced third-ranked Connecticut at USAir Arena. The Huskies came into the game with a chance to break the record for consecutive wins in Big East games set by the 1984-85 Hoyas. Before a national television audience and a sold-out arena, the Georgetown defense held Connecticut junior shooting guard Ray Allen to two points in the first half and forced the Huskies to commit 20 turnovers. Hoya sophomore forward Boubacar Aw scored 11 points and grabbed five rebounds, while Iverson scored 26 points, highlighted by a soaring dunk early in the second half that electrified the crowd, and had eight steals and six assists as the Hoyas upset Connecticut 77–65. Connecticut became the highest-ranked team that Georgetown had defeated since the 1987-88 Hoyas defeated second-ranked Pittsburgh in January 1988.

The Hoyas closed out the regular season with a 106–68 win at USAir Arena over sixth-ranked Villanova, the sixth-largest margin of victory in Georgetown history and the school's largest margin of victory ever against a Top Ten opponent. Iverson played only 27 minutes but scored 37 points, grabbed eight rebounds, and had three steals.

Georgetown finished the regular season as the first-ever Big East 7 Division champion, earning the Hoyas a No.2 seed in the 1996 Big East men's basketball tournament and a bye in its first round. The Hoyas beat Miami in the quarterfinals. In the semifinals, they faced ninth-ranked Villanova. The Wildcats got Iverson into foul trouble and held Harrington, Williams, and Aw to a combined 1-for-8 (12.5%) shooting from the field. Page responded by putting the Hoyas into a slowdown offense, focusing on quick scoring attempts as the shot clock ran down, grabbing nine rebounds, and shooting 12-for-19 (63.2%) from the field to score a career-high 34 points. Georgetown won 84–76 to advance to the tournament final the next evening.

The final was another meeting with third-ranked Connecticut. Georgetown was ahead 74–63 with 4:46 left in the game when the Hoyas again began to play a delay game, trying to get the ball inside to Iverson for scoring opportunities just before the shot clock expired. Iverson, however, shot only 4-for-15 (26.7%) from the field for the evening, and Georgetown did not score again for the rest of the game. Connecticut closed the gap. With the Hoyas leading 74-73 and thirteen seconds remaining, Ray Allen barely beat the shot clock with an off-balance shot that scored to give the Huskies a 75–74 lead. Georgetown failed in two attempts to score in the final seconds, and Connecticut took its third Big East tournament championship. It was the fourth time the Hoyas had lost in the tournament's final game since 1991. Page, however, became only the second player to receive tournament Most Valuable Player honors without playing for the championship team.

The loss prevented Georgetown from receiving a No. 1 seed in the 1996 NCAA tournament, but the Hoyas were seeded No. 2 in the tournament's East Region. The Hoyas defeated Mississippi Valley State in the first round and New Mexico in the second round, and Harrington scored 23 points as Georgetown beat eighth-ranked Texas Tech in the East Region semifinal. The Hoyas thus advanced to an NCAA regional final (the "Elite Eight") for the first time since 1989 to face the region's No. 1 seed, top-ranked Massachusetts. Although Harrington scored 13 points, Iverson shot only 6-for-21 (28.6%) from the field against the Minutemen, and Massachusetts won 86–62 to knock Georgetown out of the tournament.

Despite his poor tournament performances against Connecticut and Massachusetts, Iverson finished the year having scored 926 points, breaking the previous single-season record by 124 points, and also setting single-season records for field goals (312), field goal attempts (650), three-point shots (87), three-point attempts (238), steals (124), minutes played (1,214), and scoring average (25.0 points per game), and he ranked seventh in the United States in average points scored per game for the season. Citing a need to earn money for his family with which to pay one of his sister's medical bills, Iverson opted after the season to forgo his remaining two years of college eligibility and leave school to enter the NBA draft, the first Georgetown player to do so since John Thompson became head coach in 1972. The move was controversial, as Georgetown fans had come to expect the team's great players to fulfill a full four-year commitment to play for the school. His departure presaged a decline in Georgetown's basketball fortunes over the next decade.

The team finished the year ranked fourth in the Associated Press Poll and seventh in the Coaches' Poll.

== Roster ==
Junior reserve guard Brendan Gaughan later became a successful NASCAR driver.

#	Name	Height	Weight (lbs.)	Position	Class	Hometown	Previous Team(s)
3	Allen Iverson	6'0"	165	G	So.	Hampton, VA, U.S.	Bethel HS
4	Joseph Touomou	6'2"	195	G	Fr.	Yaounde, Cameroon	Williamston HS (Williamston, NC)
10	Eric Myles	5'10"	185	G	So.	Napoleonville, LA, U.S.	Assumption HS
11	Daymond Jackson	6'4"	195	G	Fr.	Alexandria, VA, U.S.	T. C. Williams HS
12	Dean Berry	5'10"	168	G	Fr.	Brooklyn, NY, U.S.	Episcopal HS
13	Brendan Gaughan	5'9"	185	G	Jr.	Las Vegas, NV, U.S.	Bishop Gorman HS
14	Cheikh Ya-Ya Dia	6'9"	225	F	Jr.	Dakar, Senegal	St. John's Prep-Prospect Hall (Maryland)
22	Boubacar Aw	6'7"	228	F	So.	Thiès, Senegal	East Columbus HS (Lake Waccamaw, NC)
25	Jerry Nichols	6'4"	210	G	So.	Jackson, MS, U.S.	Lanier HS
32	Godwin Owinje	6'8"	205	F	Jr.	Benin City, Nigeria	Bismarck State Junior College (North Dakota)
34	James Reed	6'0"	190	G	Jr.	Trenton, NJ, U.S.	Princeton Day School
42	Jerome Williams	6'9"	205	F	Sr.	Germantown, Maryland, U.S.	Colonel Zadok A. Magruder HS Montgomery County Community College (Maryland)
44	Victor Page	6'3"	205	G	Fr.	Washington, DC, U.S.	McKinley Technology HS (Washington, DC); Winchendon Prep (Winchendon, MA)
50	Othella Harrington	6'9"	240	C	Sr.	Jackson, MS, U.S.	Murrah HS
55	Jahidi White	6'9"	270	C	So.	St. Louis, MO, U.S.	Cardinal Ritter College Prep HS

== Rankings ==
Ranking movement Legend: ██ Improvement in ranking. ██ Decrease in ranking. ██ Not ranked the previous week. RV=Others receiving votes.
Poll	Pre	Wk 1	Wk 2	Wk 3	Wk 4	Wk 5	Wk 6	Wk 7	Wk 8	Wk 9	Wk 10	Wk 11	Wk 12	Wk 13	Wk 14	Wk 15	Wk 16	Final	Post
AP	5	5	6	6	7	6	6	6	5	8	6	9	8	14	11	8	6	4	– (Note: No Associated Press Poll this week.)
Coaches	N/A	N/A	N/A	N/A	N/A	N/A	N/A	N/A	N/A	N/A	N/A	N/A	N/A	N/A	N/A	N/A	N/A	5	7

== 1995–96 Schedule and results ==
Sources

- All times are Eastern

Date time, TV	Rank^{#}	Opponent^{#}	Result	Record	Site (attendance) city, state
Preseason
Sat., Nov. 4, 1995*; 7:30 p.m., none	No. 5	Fort Hood (U.S. Army)	W N/A	exhibition	McDonough Gymnasium (N/A); Washington, DC
Sat., Nov. 11, 1995*; 4:00 p.m., none	No. 5	Croatia	W N/A	exhibition	McDonough Gymnasium (N/A); Washington, DC
Regular Season
Thu., Nov. 16, 1995*; 7:30 p.m., ESPN	No. 5	Colgate; Preseason NIT First round	W 106−57	1–0	USAir Arena (7,193); Landover, MD
Sat., Nov. 18, 1995*; 3:30 p.m., ESPN2	No. 5	Temple; Preseason NIT Quarterfinal	W 74−49	2–0	USAir Arena (7,319); Landover, MD
Wed., Nov. 22, 1995*; N/A, ESPN	No. 5	vs. No. 25 Georgia Tech; Preseason NIT Semifinal	W 94−72	3–0	Madison Square Garden (15,249); New York, NY
Fri., Nov. 24, 1995*; N/A, ESPN	No. 5	vs. No. 19 Arizona; Preseason NIT Final	L 81−91	3–1	Madison Square Garden (12,949); New York, NY
Wed., Nov. 29, 1995*; 7:30 p.m., none	No. 6	Southern-New Orleans	W 96−65	4–1	USAir Arena (6,905); Landover, MD
Sat., Dec. 2, 1995; 4:00 p.m., HTS	No. 6	at West Virginia	W 83−80 ^{OT}	5–1 (1–0)	WVU Coliseum (15,193); Morgantown, WV
Mon., Dec. 4, 1995; 7:30 p.m., HTS	No. 6	Rutgers	W 83–52	6–1 (2–0)	USAir Arena (7,869); Landover, MD
Fri., Dec. 8, 1995*; 7:30 p.m., HTS	No. 6	Sacramento State	W 113–58	7–1	USAir Arena (10,213); Landover, MD
Mon., Dec. 18, 1995*; 7:30 p.m., HTS	No. 6	Saint Francis	W 88−55	8–1	USAir Arena (8,415); Landover, MD
Wed., Dec. 20, 1995*; 7:30 p.m., HTS	No. 6	Morgan State	W 104–60	9–1	USAir Arena (8,435); Landover, MD
Thu., Dec. 28, 1995*; 7:30 p.m., none	No. 6	vs. Duquesne	W 88−86	10–1	Lakeland Civic Arena (N/A); Lakeland, FL
Sat., Dec. 30, 1995*; 7:30 p.m., none	No. 6	vs. Saint Leo	W 123−65	11–1	Lakeland Civic Arena (N/A); Lakeland, FL
Wed., Jan. 3, 1996*; N/A, HTS	No. 6	at DePaul	W 81–61	12–1	Rosemont Horizon (N/A); Rosemont, IL
Sat., Jan. 6, 1996; 2:00 p.m., HTS	No. 6	Seton Hall	W 85–76	13–1 (3–0)	USAir Arena (18,303); Landover, MD
Wed., Jan. 10, 1996; 7:30 p.m., HTS	No. 5	at Pittsburgh	L 56–75	13–2 (3–1)	Civic Arena (12,080); Pittsburgh, PA
Sat., Jan. 13, 1996; 12:00 noon, BES	No. 5	Miami	W 72–69	14–2 (4–1)	USAir Arena (9,168); Landover, MD
Mon., Jan. 15, 1996; 7:30 p.m., ESPN	No. 5	at Notre Dame	W 74–69	15–2 (5–1)	Edmund P. Joyce Center (11,418); Notre Dame, IN
Sat., Jan. 20, 1996; 12:00 noon, BES	No. 8	at Seton Hall	W 82–62	16–2 (6–1)	Brendan Byrne Arena (11,867); East Rutherford, NJ
Wed., Jan. 24, 1996; 7:00 p.m., ESPN	No. 6	No. 17 Syracuse; Rivalry	W 83–64	17−2 (7–1)	USAir Arena (18,753); Landover, MD
Sat., Jan. 27, 1996; 2:00 p.m., CBS	No. 6	at St. John's	L 72–83	17−3 (7–2)	Madison Square Garden (13,888); New York, NY
Wed., Jan. 31, 1996; 7:00 p.m., BES	No. 9	West Virginia	W 91–67	18–3 (8–2)	USAir Arena (14,303); Landover, MD
Sat., Feb. 3, 1996; 12:00 noon, BES	No. 9	Notre Dame	W 70–53	19–3 (9–2)	USAir Arena (10,149); Landover, MD
Mon., Feb. 5, 1996; 7:30 p.m., ESPN	No. 8	at No. 16 Villanova	L 66–79	19–4 (9–3)	Spectrum (18,433); Philadelphia, PA
Sat., Feb. 10, 1996; 2:00 p.m., CBS	No. 8	at No. 18 Syracuse; Rivalry	L 64–85	19–5 (9–4)	Carrier Dome (32,589); Syracuse, NY
Tue., Feb. 13, 1996; 7:30 p.m., ESPN2	No. 14	at No. 23 Boston College	W 66–63	20–5 (10–4)	Silvio O. Conte Forum (8,606); Chestnut Hill, MA
Sat., Feb. 17, 1996*; 3:00 p.m., CBS	No. 14	No. 15 Memphis	W 81–60	21–5	USAir Arena (17,529); Landover, MD
Mon., Feb. 19, 1996; 7:30 p.m., ESPN	No. 11	No. 3 Connecticut; Rivalry	W 77–65	22–5 (11–4)	USAir Arena (19,035); Landover, MD
Sat., Feb. 24, 1996; 12:00 noon, BES	No. 11	No. 20 Boston College	W 67–64	23–5 (12–4)	USAir Arena (19,035); Landover, MD
Tue., Feb. 27, 1996; 7:00 p.m., ESPN2	No. 8	at Providence	L 77–84	23–6 (12–5)	Providence Civic Center (13,106); Providence, RI
Sat., Mar. 2, 1996; 2:00 p.m., CBS	No. 8	No. 6 Villanova	W 106–68	24–6 (13–5)	USAir Arena (19,035); Landover, MD
Big East tournament
Thu., Mar. 7, 1996; N/A, ESPN	No. 6	vs. Miami; Quarterfinal	W 92–62	25–6	Madison Square Garden (19,544); New York, NY
Fri., Mar. 8, 1996; N/A, ESPN	No. 6	vs. No. 9 Villanova; Semifinal	W 84–76	26–6	Madison Square Garden (19,544); New York, NY
Sat., Mar. 9, 1996; N/A, ESPN	No. 6	vs. No. 3 Connecticut; Final/Rivalry	L 74–75	26–7	Madison Square Garden (19,544); New York, NY
NCAA tournament
Fri., Mar. 15, 1996; N/A, N/A	No. 4	vs. Mississippi Valley State; East Regional First round	W 93–56	27–7	Richmond Coliseum (11,859); Richmond, VA
Sun., Mar. 17, 1996; N/A, N/A	No. 4	vs. New Mexico; East Regional Second Round	W 73–62	28–7	Richmond Coliseum (11,859); Richmond, VA
Thu., Mar. 21, 1996; N/A, N/A	No. 4	vs. No. 8 Texas Tech; East Regional semifinal	W 98–90	29–7	Georgia Dome (34,614); Atlanta, GA
Sat., Mar. 23, 1996; N/A, N/A	No. 4	vs. No. 1 Massachusetts; East Regional Final	L 62–86	29–8	Georgia Dome (32,328); Atlanta, GA
*Non-conference game. ^{#}Rankings from AP Poll. (#) Tournament seedings in parentheses.
