= Jason Cipolla =

American basketball player

Personal information
- Born: May 11, 1974 (age 52) Queens, New York, U.S.
- Listed height: 6 ft 7 in (2.01 m)
- Listed weight: 200 lb (91 kg)

Career information
- High school: Christ the King (Queens, New York)
- College: Tallahassee CC (1993–1995); Syracuse (1995–1997)
- NBA draft: 1997: undrafted
- Position: Shooting guard
- Number: 35

Career highlights
- Panhandle Conference Player of the Year (1994); 2× First-team All-Panhandle Conference (1993, 1994); Third-team All-Big East (1997)

Jason Cipolla (born May 11, 1974) is an American former basketball player.

== High school ==
While living in Woodhaven, Queens Jason Cipolla attended Christ the King Regional High School in the neighborhood of Middle Village, Queens in New York City.

== College ==
Following high school, Cipolla attended Tallahassee Community College for two years, earning an Associate degree. While playing basketball Cipolla earned two first-team All-Panhandle Conference awards, during which he ranked third in scoring and first in scoring average. In 1996, Cipolla transferred to Syracuse University. In two seasons with Syracuse Orangemen Cipolla started 56 of 69 games. During his junior year Cipolla's team reached the finals of the 1996 NCAA Men's Division I Basketball Tournament, losing to the University of Kentucky. In the game, Cipolla tied the title game record of four steals. His most memorable tournament moment was during a sweet sixteen matchup against the University of Georgia, when he hit a 16-foot fade away jump shot to tie the game as time expired. He was akso named third-team All-Big East.
