= Tony Delk =

American basketball player-coach (born 1974)

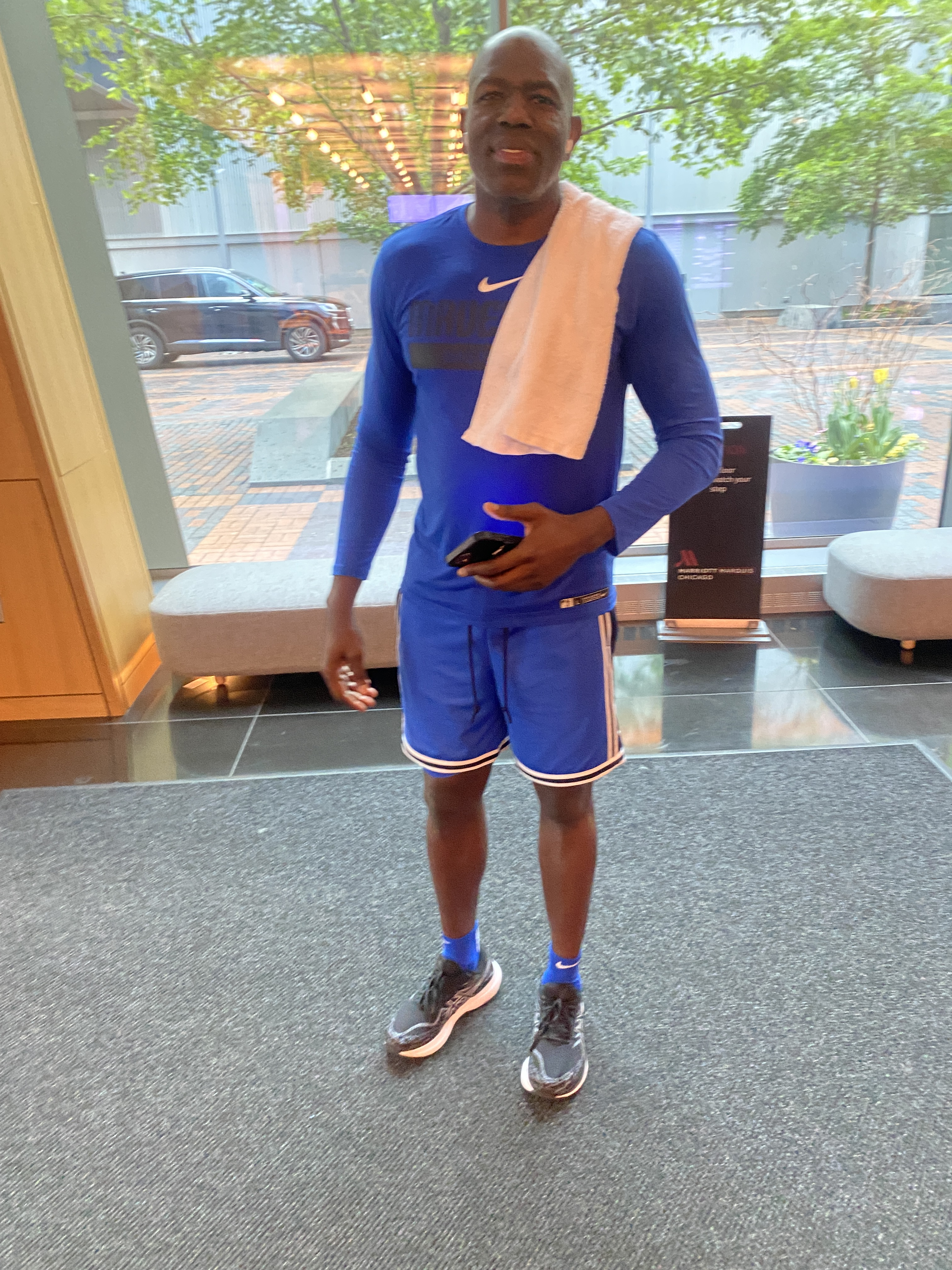
- Delk at the 2023 NBA Draft Combine

Personal information
- Born: January 28, 1974 (age 52) Covington, Tennessee, U.S.
- Listed height: 6 ft 2 in (1.88 m)
- Listed weight: 189 lb (86 kg)

Career information
- High school: Haywood (Brownsville, Tennessee)
- College: Kentucky (1992–1996)
- NBA draft: 1996: 1st round, 16th overall pick
- Drafted by: Charlotte Hornets
- Playing career: 1996–2008
- Position: Point guard / shooting guard
- Number: 00, 28, 7, 5
- Coaching career: 2009–2013

Career history

Playing
- 1996–1997: Charlotte Hornets
- 1997–1999: Golden State Warriors
- 1999–2000: Sacramento Kings
- 2000–2002: Phoenix Suns
- 2002–2003: Boston Celtics
- 2003–2004: Dallas Mavericks
- 2004–2006: Atlanta Hawks
- 2006: Detroit Pistons
- 2006–2007: Panathinaikos
- 2008: Gigantes de Carolina

Career highlights
- As player: Greek League champion (2007); Greek Cup champion (2007); EuroLeague champion (2007); NCAA champion (1996); Final Four Most Outstanding Player (1996); Consensus first-team All-American (1996); SEC Player of the Year (1996); 2× First-team All-SEC (1995, 1996); Fourth-team Parade All-American (1992); McDonald's All-American (1992); Class AAA Tennessee Mr. Basketball (1992); As assistant coach: 2× SEC champion (2010, 2011)

Career NBA statistics
- Points: 4,957 (9.1 ppg)
- Rebounds: 1,351 (2.5 rpg)
- Assists: 1,024 (1.9 apg)
- Stats at NBA.com
- Stats at Basketball Reference

Tony Lorenzo Delk (born January 28, 1974) is an American former professional basketball player and college assistant coach. He currently serves as a scout for the Denver Nuggets of the National Basketball Association (NBA). During his playing days, he was team leader of the Kentucky Wildcats team that won the 1996 NCAA Championship Game. After college, he played for eight NBA teams over 10 seasons.

== High school ==
Delk attended Haywood Junior High School and Haywood High School in Brownsville, Tennessee. During his 1992 senior year of high school, Delk was named "Mr. Basketball" in the state of Tennessee (TSSAA Class 3A Mr.Basketball 1992) and also to the Parade and McDonald's All-American Teams.

== College career ==
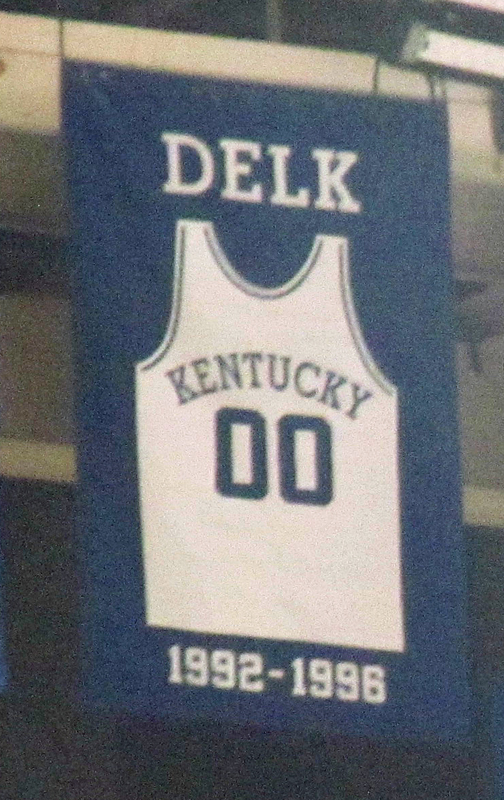
A jersey honoring Delk hangs in Rupp Arena.

As a sophomore at Kentucky, Delk was voted All-SEC 2nd Team by the coaches and All-SEC 3rd Team by the Associated Press, while also making the All-SEC Tournament Team for his outstanding play. Delk was named to the All-SEC 1st and All-NCAA Regional teams during the 1994–95 season. In the 1995–96 season, Delk was named to the All-American and All-SEC first teams and was named NCAA basketball tournament Most Outstanding Player. He also received SEC Player of the Year honors during the season. Delk joined Omega Psi Phi fraternity while at Kentucky.

== Career statistics ==
Legend
GP	Games played	GS	Games started	MPG	Minutes per game
FG%	Field goal percentage	3P%	3-point field goal percentage	FT%	Free throw percentage
RPG	Rebounds per game	APG	Assists per game	SPG	Steals per game
BPG	Blocks per game	PPG	Points per game	**Bold**	Career high

=== NBA ===
==== Regular season ====
Year	Team	GP	GS	MPG	FG%	3P%	FT%	RPG	APG	SPG	BPG	PPG
1996–97	Charlotte	61	1	14.2	.465	.464	.824	1.6	1.6	.6	.1	5.4
1997–98	Charlotte	3	0	11.3	**.750**	**1.000**	.500	.7	1.0	.0	.0	2.7
1997–98	Golden State	74	9	22.3	.392	.263	.738	2.3	2.3	1.0	.2	10.4
1998–99	Golden State	36	13	17.5	.364	.242	.648	1.5	**2.6**	.4	.2	6.8
1999–00	Sacramento	46	1	14.8	.430	.225	.797	1.9	1.2	.8	.1	6.4
2000–01	Phoenix	**82**	11	27.9	.415	.321	.787	3.2	2.0	.9	.2	**12.3**
2001–02	Phoenix	41	1	21.4	.399	.320	.836	3.0	2.0	.8	.1	10.6
2001–02	Boston	22	16	25.9	.349	.299	.733	**3.6**	2.3	1.0	**.3**	7.4
2002–03	Boston	67	**39**	**28.0**	.416	.395	.782	3.5	2.2	**1.1**	.1	9.8
2003–04	Dallas	33	11	15.4	.380	.303	.841	1.8	.8	.8	.2	6.0
2004–05	Atlanta	56	1	23.9	.416	.356	.757	2.3	1.9	.8	.1	11.9
2005–06	Atlanta	1	0	7.0	.000	—	**1.000**	2.0	.0	.0	.0	2.0
2005–06	Detroit	23	0	16.4	.444	.426	.720	2.2	1.4	.6	.0	7.8
Career		545	103	21.5	.408	.343	.769	2.5	1.9	.8	.1	9.1

==== Playoffs ====
Year	Team	GP	GS	MPG	FG%	3P%	FT%	RPG	APG	SPG	BPG	PPG
1997	Charlotte	3	1	28.3	.419	.385	—	3.3	2.0	.7	.0	10.3
2000	Sacramento	5	0	20.2	.439	**.600**	.739	3.6	1.4	.6	.0	11.2
2001	Phoenix	4	0	28.5	.419	.400	.636	4.0	1.0	.8	.0	11.8
2002	Boston	14	0	16.2	.354	.394	.583	2.4	1.1	.6	**.4**	4.7
2003	Boston	10	**10**	**36.8**	**.474**	.449	**.875**	**4.7**	**3.6**	**1.2**	**.4**	**15.8**
2004	Dallas	1	0	5.0	—	—	—	1.0	2.0	1.0	.0	0.0
2006	Detroit	**16**	0	8.6	.404	.200	.700	1.1	0.5	.4	.0	3.0
Career		53	11	19.6	.425	.400	.750	2.7	1.5	.7	.2	7.7

=== EuroLeague ===
Legend
GP	Games played	GS	Games started	MPG	Minutes per game
FG%	Field-goal percentage	3P%	3-point field-goal percentage	FT%	Free-throw percentage
RPG	Rebounds per game	APG	Assists per game	SPG	Steals per game
BPG	Blocks per game	PPG	Points per game	PIR	Performance index rating
**Bold**	Career high	†	Won a EuroLeague championship

Year	Team	GP	GS	MPG	FG%	3P%	FT%	RPG	APG	SPG	BPG	PPG	PIR
2006–07†	Panathinaikos	17	5	16.4	.407	.314	.763	1.9	1.0	.6	.2	7.5	5.1

=== College ===
Year	Team	GP	GS	MPG	FG%	3P%	FT%	RPG	APG	SPG	BPG	PPG
1992–93	Kentucky	30	0	9.6	.452	.353	.727	1.9	.7	.6	.1	4.5
1993–94	Kentucky	34	34	28.1	.455	.374	.639	**4.5**	1.7	**1.9**	**.6**	16.6
1994–95	Kentucky	33	32	**29.1**	.478	.391	.674	3.3	**2.0**	1.6	.3	16.7
1995–96	Kentucky	**36**	**36**	26.3	**.494**	**.443**	**.800**	4.2	1.8	**1.9**	.4	**17.8**
Career		133	102	23.7	.474	.397	.709	3.5	1.6	1.5	.3	14.2

== Playing career ==
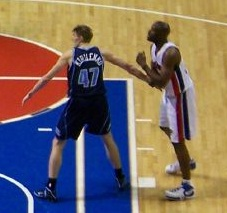
Delk (right) guarded by Andrei Kirilenko in 2006.

Tony Delk was picked 16th overall in the 1996 NBA draft by the Charlotte Hornets. He was traded by the Hornets along with Muggsy Bogues to the Golden State Warriors for B. J. Armstrong on November 7, 1997, where he played for two seasons before signing with the Sacramento Kings on August 16, 1999. He appeared in 46 games in 1999–2000, subsequently joining the Phoenix Suns on August 1, 2000.

In a January 2, 2001, overtime game against the Sacramento Kings, Delk scored a career-high 53 points on 20-for-27 field goal shooting. This was the only game of Delk's career in which he scored 30 or more points. Delk also set the record for the most individual points ever scored in the ARCO Arena. Delk was eventually dealt with Rodney Rogers to the Celtics, for Joe Johnson, Milt Palacio, and Randy Brown.

On October 20, 2003, Delk was traded to the Dallas Mavericks, along with Antoine Walker for Chris Mills, Jiří Welsch, Raef LaFrentz, and a 2004 first-round pick. After a year with the Mavericks, Delk and Walker were again traded, in a deal for Jason Terry and Alan Henderson. Delk lasted one and a half seasons with the Hawks before being waived on February 25, 2006, signing with the Detroit Pistons on March 1, where he backed up point guard Chauncey Billups.

Delk finished his NBA career with averages of 9.1 PPG, 2.5 RPG and 1.9 APG as he, in August 2006, signed a contract with the Greek basketball team, Panathinaikos, in Athens. He won the Greek Cup, the Greek Championship and the European Championship with Panathinaikos, but was released in May 2007, citing compatibility issues. He announced his retirement from professional basketball in November 2007. In 2008, nonetheless, he played three games for the Gigantes de Carolina in the BSN, the professional basketball league of Puerto Rico. He retired, once again, and served as a technical assistant with the same team.

== Coaching career ==
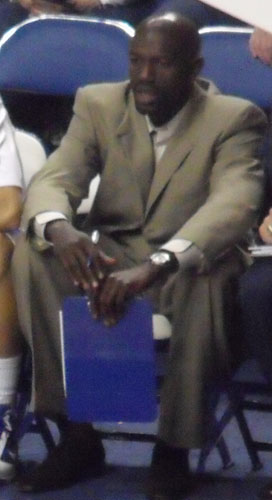
Delk as an assistant coach with the Kentucky Wildcats in 2009

On April 16, 2009, it was announced that Delk would be returning to his alma mater along with his former college teammate Scott Padgett to serve on coach John Calipari's staff at the University of Kentucky.

In July 2011, the New Mexico State Aggies basketball team hired him as an assistant coach to Marvin Menzies.

In June 2013, Delk left the New Mexico State staff to pursue other opportunities closer to his family in Atlanta.

On October 16, 2025, the Denver Nuggets hired Delk to serve as a scout.

== Broadcasting career ==
In October 2014, the SEC Network announced Delk had been hired as an in-studio analyst and announcer for the upcoming college basketball season.

== Personal life ==
Tony Delk is the president of the Taylor Delk Sickle Cell Foundation. The foundation is named after his daughter, who has sickle cell disease.

Delk divorced from his former wife, Margie Delk, in 2007.
