= Otis Hill =

American basketball player (born 1974)

Personal information
- Born: March 31, 1974 (age 52) White Plains, New York, U.S.
- Listed height: 6 ft 8 in (2.03 m)
- Listed weight: 290 lb (132 kg)

Career information
- High school: Pleasantville (New York)
- College: Syracuse (1993–1997)
- NBA draft: 1997: undrafted
- Playing career: 1997–2009
- Position: Center

Career history
- 1997: Portland Wave
- 1997–1998: Meysu Spor
- 1998–1999: Connecticut Pride
- 1999: Atlantic City Seagulls
- 1999: Indios de Mayagüez
- 1999–2000: Connecticut Pride
- 2000: Atlantic City Seagulls
- 2000: Los Prados Santo Domingo
- 2000: Pennsylvania ValleyDawgs
- 2000–2001: Racing Antwerpen
- 2001: Pennsylvania ValleyDawgs
- 2001–2002: Orlandina Basket
- 2002–2004: Basket Zaragoza
- 2004–2005: Polonia Warszawa
- 2005–2006: Ironi Nahariya
- 2006: Split
- 2006–2007: Anwil Włocławek
- 2007–2008: Ironi Nahariya
- 2008–2009: Odesa
- 2009: Ironi Ramat Gan

Career highlights
- Polish Cup winner (2007); CBA champion (1999); 2× USBL champion (1999, 2001)

Otis Hill (born 31 March 1974) is an American former professional basketball player. He played as a power forward. He graduated from Pleasantville High School in New York State, played basketball there and won many awards. At Pleasantville High School, Otis was also a standout in football and a member of the 1991 undefeated season when the team was ranked #1 in the state. Otis went on to play at Syracuse University, and professionally in Belgium, Spain (LEB), Italy, Israel, Poland, and for BC Odesa in the Ukrainian Basketball SuperLeague, before retiring in 2009.
