= 1996 NCAA Division I men's basketball tournament =

Edition of USA college basketball tournament

- Season: 1995–96
- Teams: 64
- Finals site: Continental Airlines Arena, East Rutherford, New Jersey
- Champions: Kentucky Wildcats (6th title, 8th title game, 11th Final Four)
- Runner-up: Syracuse Orangemen (2nd title game, 3rd Final Four)
- Semifinalists: UMass Minutemen (Vacated) (1st Final Four); Mississippi State Bulldogs (1st Final Four)
- Winning coach: Rick Pitino (1st title)
- MOP: Tony Delk (Kentucky)
- Attendance: 631,834
- Top scorer: John Wallace (Syracuse) (131 points)

The 1996 NCAA Division I men's basketball tournament involved 64 schools playing in single-elimination play to determine the national champion of men's NCAA Division I college basketball. The 58th annual edition of the tournament began on March 14, 1996, and ended with the championship game on April 1 at Continental Airlines Arena (now known as Meadowlands Arena) in the Meadowlands Sports Complex in East Rutherford, New Jersey. A total of 63 games were played.

The Final Four venue was notable for several reasons:

- This marked the first time that the NCAA finals had been held in Greater New York since 1950.
- This was also the last (men's) Final Four to be held in a basketball/hockey-specific facility. Every Final Four since has been held in a domed stadium (usually built for football) because of NCAA venue capacity requirements. Therefore, this was also the last time the NCAA finals have been held in the Greater New York area and the Northeastern United States (for the time being).

The Final Four consisted of Kentucky, making its first appearance in the Final Four since 1993 and eleventh overall, Massachusetts, making its first ever appearance in the Final Four, Syracuse, making its third appearance in the Final Four and first since 1987, and Mississippi State, also making its first appearance.

Kentucky, coached by Rick Pitino, won its sixth national championship by defeating Syracuse in the final game 76–67. It was the Orangemen's second championship game loss under coach Jim Boeheim, joining a 74–73 defeat vs. Indiana in 1987 (Boeheim and Syracuse finally won the championship in 2003).

The championship game the second Final Four meeting between Pitino and Boeheim. Boeheim's Orangemen defeated Pitino's Providence Friars in the 1987 semifinals.

Tony Delk of Kentucky was named the tournament's Most Outstanding Player. Kentucky's run to the championship was one of the most dominant in NCAA tournament history, as the Wildcats won each of their first four games by at least 20 points and won every game by at least 7 points.

Massachusetts, coached by John Calipari, was later stripped of its wins, including the UMass Minutemen's Final Four appearance, by the NCAA because UMass star Marcus Camby had accepted illegal gifts from agents. Connecticut, coached by Jim Calhoun, was additionally punished monetarily due to players accepting illegal gifts from agents.

The 1996 tournament was the last to feature teams from the Big Eight and Southwest Conferences; later four teams from the SWC would merge with the Big Eight to form the Big 12 Conference. Through 2025, they were the last Division I conferences to disband and/or merge after sending teams to the NCAA tournament. (In 2024, the Pac-12 sent four teams to the tournament before it nearly disintegrated, with all but two members--Oregon State and Washington State--leaving for other conferences. The Beavers and Cougars played in the West Coast Conference during the 2024–25 season.)

This is also one of only two Final Fours between 1986 and 2001 (1987 being the other) to include neither Duke nor North Carolina.

As of 2026, this is the earliest tournament from which all four Final Four coaches (Pitino, Boeheim, Calipari and Mississippi State's Richard Williams) are still living.

This was the last tournament in which officials wore collared shirts. A v-neck shirt, already worn in several conferences during the regular season, was adopted association-wide in 1996–97.

== Schedule and venues ==
1996 first and second rounds
1996 Regionals (blue) and Final Four (red)

The following are the sites that were selected to host each round of the 1996 tournament:

First and Second Rounds

- March 14 and 16
  - East Region
    - Providence Civic Center, Providence, Rhode Island (Host: Providence College)
  - Midwest Region
    - Reunion Arena, Dallas, Texas (Host: Southwest Conference)
  - Southeast Region
    - RCA Dome, Indianapolis, Indiana (Hosts: Butler University, Midwestern Collegiate Conference)
  - West Region
    - University Arena ("The Pit"), Albuquerque, New Mexico (Host: University of New Mexico)
- March 15 and 17
  - East Region
    - Richmond Coliseum, Richmond, Virginia (Hosts: University of Richmond, Virginia Commonwealth University)
  - Midwest Region
    - Bradley Center, Milwaukee, Wisconsin (Host: Marquette University)
  - Southeast Region
    - Orlando Arena, Orlando, Florida (Host: Stetson University)
  - West Region
    - ASU Activity Center, Tempe, Arizona (Host: Arizona State University)

Regional semifinals and finals (Sweet Sixteen and Elite Eight)

- March 21 and 23
  - East Regional, Georgia Dome, Atlanta, Georgia (Host: Georgia Institute of Technology)
  - Midwest Regional, Hubert H. Humphrey Metrodome, Minneapolis, Minnesota (Host: University of Minnesota)
- March 22 and 24
  - Southeast Regional, Rupp Arena, Lexington, Kentucky (Host: University of Kentucky)
  - West Regional, McNichols Sports Arena, Denver, Colorado (Host: University of Colorado)

National semifinals and championship (Final Four and championship)

- March 30 and April 1
  - Continental Airlines Arena, East Rutherford, New Jersey (Hosts: Seton Hall University, Big East Conference)

== Teams ==
There were 30 automatic bids awarded to the tournament - of these, 27 were given to the winners of their conference's tournament, while three were awarded to the team with the best regular-season record in their conference (Big Ten, Ivy League and Pac-10).

Two conferences, the American West Conference and Conference USA, did not receive automatic bids to the tournament.

Four conference champions made their first NCAA tournament appearances: Monmouth (NEC), UNC Greensboro (Big South), Valparaiso (Mid-Continent), and Western Carolina (Southern).

=== Automatic qualifiers ===
Automatic qualifiers
Conference	Team	Appearance	Last bid
ACC	Wake Forest	14th	1995
Atlantic 10	UMass (vacated)	–	1995
Big East	Connecticut (vacated)	–	1995
Big Eight	Iowa State	9th	1995
Big Sky	Montana State	3rd	1986
Big South	UNC Greensboro	1st	Never
Big Ten	Purdue (vacated)	–	1995
Big West	San Jose State	3rd	1980
CAA	VCU	6th	1985
Ivy League	Princeton	19th	1992
MAAC	Canisius	4th	1957
MAC	Eastern Michigan	3rd	1991
MCC	Northern Illinois	3rd	1991
MEAC	South Carolina State	2nd	1989
Mid-Continent	Valparaiso	1st	Never
Missouri Valley	Tulsa	9th	1995
NAC	Drexel	4th	1995
NEC	Monmouth	1st	Never
Ohio Valley	Austin Peay	4th	1987
Pac-10	UCLA	31st	1995
Patriot	Colgate	2nd	1995
SEC	Mississippi State	4th	1995
Southern	Western Carolina	1st	Never
Southland	Northeast Louisiana	7th	1993
Sun Belt	New Orleans	4th	1993
SWAC	Mississippi Valley State	3rd	1992
SWC	Texas Tech (vacated)	–	1993
TAAC	UCF	2nd	1994
WAC	New Mexico	7th	1994
West Coast	Portland	2nd	1959

=== Tournament seeds ===
East Regional – Georgia Dome, Atlanta, Georgia
Seed	School	Conference	Record	Berth type
1	UMass (vacated)	Atlantic 10	31–1	Automatic
2	Georgetown	Big East	26–7	At-Large
3	Texas Tech (vacated)	SWC	28–1	Automatic
4	Marquette	Conference USA	22–7	At-Large
5	Penn State	Big Ten	21–6	At-Large
6	North Carolina	ACC	20–10	At-Large
7	New Mexico	WAC	28–5	Automatic
8	Bradley	Missouri Valley	22–7	At-Large
9	Stanford	Pac-10	19–8	At-Large
10	Kansas State	Big Eight	17–11	At-Large
11	New Orleans	Sun Belt	21–8	Automatic
12	Arkansas	SEC	18–12	At-Large
13	Monmouth	NEC	20–9	Automatic
14	Northern Illinois	MCC	20–9	Automatic
15	Mississippi Valley State	SWAC	22–6	Automatic
16	UCF	TAAC	11–18	Automatic

Midwest Regional – Hubert H. Humphrey Metrodome, Minneapolis, Minnesota
Seed	School	Conference	Record	Berth type
1	Kentucky	SEC	28–2	At-Large
2	Wake Forest	ACC	26–6	Automatic
3	Villanova	Big East	25–6	At-Large
4	Utah	WAC	25–6	At-Large
5	Iowa State	Big Eight	23–8	Automatic
6	Louisville	Conference USA	20–11	At-Large
7	Michigan (vacated)	Big Ten	20–11	At-Large
8	Green Bay	MCC	25–3	At-Large
9	Virginia Tech	Atlantic 10	22–5	At-Large
10	Texas	SWC	20–9	At-Large
11	Tulsa	Missouri Valley	22–7	Automatic
12	California (vacated)	Pac-10	17–10	At-Large
13	Canisius	MAAC	19–10	Automatic
14	Portland	West Coast	19–10	Automatic
15	Northeast Louisiana	Southland	16–13	Automatic
16	San Jose State	Big West	13–16	Automatic

Southeast Regional – Rupp Arena, Lexington, Kentucky
Seed	School	Conference	Record	Berth type
1	Connecticut (vacated)	Big East	30–2	Automatic
2	Cincinnati	Conference USA	25–4	At-Large
3	Georgia Tech	ACC	22–11	At-Large
4	UCLA	Pac-10	23–7	Automatic
5	Mississippi State	SEC	22–7	Automatic
6	Indiana	Big Ten	19–11	At-Large
7	Temple	Atlantic 10	19–12	At-Large
8	Duke	ACC	18–12	At-Large
9	Eastern Michigan	MAC	24–5	Automatic
10	Oklahoma	Big Eight	17–12	At-Large
11	Boston College	Big East	18–10	At-Large
12	VCU	CAA	17–10	Automatic
13	Princeton	Ivy League	21–6	Automatic
14	Austin Peay	Ohio Valley	19–10	Automatic
15	UNC Greensboro	Big South	20–9	Automatic
16	Colgate	Patriot League	15–14	Automatic

West Regional – McNichols Sports Arena, Denver, Colorado
Seed	School	Conference	Record	Berth type
1	Purdue (vacated)	Big Ten	26–4	Automatic
2	Kansas	Big Eight	25–5	At-Large
3	Arizona	Pac-10	24–6	At-Large
4	Syracuse	Big East	24–8	At-Large
5	Memphis	Conference USA	22–7	At-Large
6	Iowa	Big Ten	22–8	At-Large
7	Maryland	ACC	17–12	At-Large
8	Georgia	SEC	19–9	At-Large
9	Clemson	ACC	18–10	At-Large
10	Santa Clara	West Coast	19–8	At-Large
11	George Washington	Atlantic 10	21–7	At-Large
12	Drexel	NAC	26–3	Automatic
13	Montana State	Big Sky	21–8	Automatic
14	Valparaiso	Mid-Continent	23–7	Automatic
15	South Carolina State	MEAC	22–7	Automatic
16	Western Carolina	Southern	17–12	Automatic

== Bracket ==
=== East Regional – Atlanta ===
First round March 14–15
1	~~Massachusetts~~	92
16	UCF	70
Providence – Thu/Sat
8	Bradley	58
9	Stanford	66
5	Penn State	80
12	Arkansas	86
Providence – Thu/Sat
4	Marquette	68
13	Monmouth	44
6	North Carolina	83
11	New Orleans	62
Richmond – Fri/Sun
3	~~Texas Tech~~	74
14	Northern Illinois	73
7	New Mexico	69
10	Kansas State	48
Richmond – Fri/Sun
2	Georgetown	93
15	Mississippi Valley State	56

Second round March 16–17
1	~~Massachusetts~~	79
9	Stanford	74
12	Arkansas	65
4	Marquette	56
6	North Carolina	73
3	~~Texas Tech~~	92
7	New Mexico	65
2	Georgetown	75

Regional semifinals March 21
1	~~Massachusetts~~	79
12	Arkansas	63
3	~~Texas Tech~~	90
2	Georgetown	98

Regional Finals; March 23
1	~~Massachusetts~~	86
2	Georgetown	62

==== Regional Final summary ====
CBS

Saturday, March 23

box score

#1 ~~Massachusetts Minutemen~~ 86, #2 Georgetown Hoyas 62
Scoring by half: 38–34, 48–28
Pts: M.Camby – 22; Rebs: D. Bright, M. Camby – 7 Asts: C. Travieso – 6	Pts: A. Iverson – 23; Rebs: J. Williams – 8 Asts: J. Touomou, J. Williams, O. Harrington – 2

Georgia Dome – Atlanta, GA

==== East Regional all-tournament team ====
- Marcus Camby – Massachusetts (MOP)
- Allen Iverson – Georgetown
- Donta Bright – Massachusetts
- Carmelo Travieso – Massachusetts
- Jason Sasser – Texas Tech

=== Midwest Regional – Minneapolis ===
First round March 14–15
1	Kentucky	110
16	San Jose State	72
Dallas – Thu/Sat
8	UW–Green Bay	49
9	Virginia Tech	61
5	Iowa State	74
12	California	64
Dallas – Thu/Sat
4	Utah	72
13	Canisius	43
6	Louisville	82^{OT}
11	Tulsa	80
Milwaukee – Fri/Sun
3	Villanova	92
14	Portland	58
7	~~Michigan~~	76
10	Texas	80
Milwaukee – Fri/Sun
2	Wake Forest	62
15	Northeast Louisiana	50

Second round March 16–17
1	Kentucky	84
9	Virginia Tech	60
5	Iowa State	67
4	Utah	73
6	Louisville	68
3	Villanova	64
10	Texas	62
2	Wake Forest	65

Regional semifinals March 21
1	Kentucky	101
4	Utah	70
6	Louisville	59
2	Wake Forest	60

Regional Finals; March 23
1	Kentucky	83
2	Wake Forest	63

Michigan's appearance in the 1996 NCAA tournament along with 20 regular season wins were vacated on November 7, 2002, as part of the settlement of the University of Michigan basketball scandal. Unlike forfeiture, a vacated game does not result in the other school being credited with a win, only with the removal of any Michigan wins from all records.

==== Regional Final summary ====
CBS

Saturday, March 23

box score

#1 Kentucky Wildcats 83, #2 Wake Forest Demon Deacons 63
Scoring by half: 38–19, 45–44
Pts: T. Delk – 25; Rebs: A. Walker – 6 Asts: A. Epps – 6	Pts: S. Goolsby, T. Duncan – 14; Rebs: T. Duncan – 16; Asts: T. Duncan – 6

Hubert H. Humphrey Metrodome – Minneapolis, MN

==== Midwest Regional all-tournament team ====
- Tony Delk – Kentucky (MOP)
- Derek Anderson – Kentucky
- Anthony Epps – Kentucky
- Antoine Walker – Kentucky
- Tim Duncan – Wake Forest

=== Southeast Regional – Lexington, Kentucky ===
First round March 14–15
1	~~Connecticut~~	68
16	Colgate	59
Indianapolis – Thu/Sat
8	Duke	60
9	Eastern Michigan	75
5	Mississippi State	58
12	VCU	51
Indianapolis – Thu/Sat
4	UCLA	41
13	Princeton	43
6	Indiana	51
11	Boston College	64
Orlando – Fri/Sun
3	Georgia Tech	90
14	Austin Peay	79
7	Temple	61
10	Oklahoma	43
Orlando – Fri/Sun
2	Cincinnati	66
15	UNC Greensboro	61

Second round March 16–17
1	~~Connecticut~~	95
9	Eastern Michigan	81
5	Mississippi State	63
13	Princeton	41
11	Boston College	89
3	Georgia Tech	103
7	Temple	65
2	Cincinnati	78

Regional semifinals March 22
1	~~Connecticut~~	55
5	Mississippi State	60
3	Georgia Tech	70
2	Cincinnati	87

Regional Finals; March 24
5	Mississippi State	73
2	Cincinnati	63

==== Regional Final summary ====
CBS

Sunday, March 24

box score

#5 Mississippi State Bulldogs 73, #2 Cincinnati Bearcats 63
Scoring by half: 37–29, 36–34
Pts: D. Jones – 23; Rebs: D. Jones – 13; Asts: D. Wilson – 6	Pts: D. Fortson – 24; Rebs: D. Fortson – 13; Asts: K. Legree – 4

Rupp Arena – Lexington, KY

==== Southeast Regional all-tournament team ====
- Dontae' Jones – Mississippi State (MOP)
- Darnell Burton – Cincinnati
- Danny Fortson – Cincinnati
- Erick Dampier – Mississippi State
- Darryl Wilson – Mississippi State

=== West Regional – Denver, Colorado ===
First round March 14–15
1	Purdue	73
16	Western Carolina	71
Albuquerque – Thu/Sat
8	Georgia	81
9	Clemson	74
5	Memphis	63
12	Drexel	75
Albuquerque – Thu/Sat
4	Syracuse	88
13	Montana State	55
6	Iowa	81
11	George Washington	79
Tempe – Fri/Sun
3	Arizona	90
14	Valparaiso	51
7	Maryland	79
10	Santa Clara	91
Tempe – Fri/Sun
2	Kansas	92
15	South Carolina State	54

Second round March 16–17
1	Purdue	69
8	Georgia	76
12	Drexel	58
4	Syracuse	69
6	Iowa	73
3	Arizona	87
10	Santa Clara	51
2	Kansas	76

Regional semifinals March 22
8	Georgia	81
4	Syracuse	83^{OT}
3	Arizona	80
2	Kansas	83

Regional Finals; March 24
4	Syracuse	60
2	Kansas	57

==== Regional Final summary ====
CBS

Sunday, March 24

box score

#4 Syracuse Orangemen 60, #2 Kansas Jayhawks 57
Scoring by half: 35–26, 25–31
Pts: J. Wallace, O. Hill – 15; Rebs: J. Wallace – 9 Asts: L. Sims – 4	Pts: J. Vaughn – 21; Rebs: R. LaFrentz – 9 Asts: J. Haase – 6

McNichols Sports Arena – Denver, CO

==== West Regional all-tournament team ====
- John Wallace – Syracuse (MOP)
- Pertha Robinson – Georgia
- Shandon Anderson – Georgia
- Jacque Vaughn – Kansas
- Otis Hill – Syracuse

=== Final Four at East Rutherford, New Jersey ===
National semifinals March 30
E1	~~Massachusetts~~	74
MW1	Kentucky	81
SE5	Mississippi State	69
W4	Syracuse	77

National Championship Game; April 1
MW1	Kentucky	76
W4	Syracuse	67

On May 8, 1997, the NCAA Executive Committee voted to negate the Minutemen's 1996 NCAA Tournament record, for Marcus Camby's acceptance of agents' improper gifts. The team's 35–2 season record was reduced to 31–1, and the UMass slot in the Final Four is officially marked as "vacated". The Final Four trophy, banner, and 45% of tournament revenue were returned to the NCAA. Camby reimbursed the school for the lost revenue. Unlike forfeiture, a vacated game does not result in the other school being credited with a win, only with UMass removing the wins from its own record.

==== National semifinals ====
CBS

Saturday, March 30

box score

#1 Kentucky Wildcats 81, #1 ~~Massachusetts Minutemen~~ 74
Scoring by half: 36–28, 45–46
Pts: T. Delk – 20; Rebs: W. McCarty – 10; Asts: A. Epps, A. Walker, D. Anderson, W. McCarty – 4	Pts: M. Camby – 25; Rebs: D. Bright – 9 Asts: E. Padilla – 12

Continental Airlines Arena – East Rutherford, NJ

CBS

Saturday, March 30

box score

#4 Syracuse Orangemen 77, #5 Mississippi State Bulldogs 69
Scoring by half: 36–36, 41–33
Pts: J. Wallace – 21; Rebs: T. Burgan – 7 Asts: L. Siims – 9	Pts: D. Wilson – 20; Rebs: E. Dampier – 14; Asts: M. Bullard – 8

Continental Airlines Arena – East Rutherford, NJ

==== National Championship ====
CBS

Monday, April 1

Box score

#1 Kentucky Wildcats 76, #4 Syracuse Orangemen 67
Scoring by half: 42–33, 34–34
Pts: T. Delk – 24; Rebs: A. Walker – 9 Asts: A. Epps – 7	Pts: J. Wallace – 29; Rebs: J. Wallace, O. Hill – 10; Asts: L. Sims – 7

Continental Airlines Arena – East Rutherford, NJ

==== Final Four all-tournament team ====
- Tony Delk – Kentucky (MOP)
- Ron Mercer – Kentucky
- Marcus Camby – Massachusetts
- Todd Burgan – Syracuse
- John Wallace – Syracuse

== Announcers ==
- Jim Nantz/Bob Rathbun and Billy Packer – First & Second Round at Milwaukee, Wisconsin; Southeast Regional at Lexington, Kentucky; Final Four at East Rutherford, New Jersey
- Sean McDonough/Bill Raftery/Michele Tafoya – First & Second Round at Orlando, Florida; Midwest Regional at Minneapolis, Minnesota
- Tim Ryan and Al McGuire – First & Second Round at Providence, Rhode Island; West Regional at Denver, Colorado
- Gus Johnson/Quinn Buckner/Andrea Joyce – First & Second Round at Indianapolis; East Regional at Atlanta, Georgia
- Mike Gorman and George Raveling – First & Second Round at Dallas, Texas
- Ted Robinson and Larry Farmer – First & Second Round at Richmond, Virginia
- Tim Brando and Derrek Dickey – First & Second Round at Albuquerque, New Mexico
- Bill Macatee and Dan Bonner – First & Second Round at Tempe, Arizona

Note: During the Midwest Regional Final in Minneapolis; sideline reporter Michele Tafoya temporarily substituted for Sean McDonough in the play-by-play booth when McDonough became ill; calling about 10 minutes of the first half before McDonough felt well enough to resume play-by-play; in the process making her the first woman to call part of an NCAA Men's Division I Tournament game.

== See also ==
- 1996 NCAA Division II men's basketball tournament
- 1996 NCAA Division III men's basketball tournament
- 1996 NCAA Division I women's basketball tournament
- 1996 NCAA Division II women's basketball tournament
- 1996 NCAA Division III women's basketball tournament
- 1996 National Invitation Tournament
- 1996 National Women's Invitation Tournament
- 1996 NAIA Division I men's basketball tournament
- 1996 NAIA Division II men's basketball tournament
- 1996 NAIA Division I women's basketball tournament
- 1996 NAIA Division II women's basketball tournament
