= Richard Williams (basketball coach) =

American basketball coach (born 1945)

Biographical details
- Born: August 22, 1945 (age 81); Vicksburg, Mississippi
- Education: Mississippi State

Coaching career (HC unless noted)
- 1984–1986: Mississippi State (assistant)
- 1986–1998: Mississippi State
- 2001: Memphis Houn'Dawgs
- 2003: Pearl HS (MS)
- 2004: Jackson Rage
- 2010–2014: Arkansas State (assistant)
- 2020–2021: Southern Miss (special assistant)

Administrative career (AD unless noted)
- 2008–2009: UAB (DBO)
- 2009: Louisiana Tech (DBO)

Head coaching record
- Overall: 191–163 (.540) (college)
- Tournaments: 6–3 (NCAA Division I); 1–2 (NIT)

Accomplishments and honors

Championships
- NCAA Division I Regional – Final Four (1996); SEC tournament (1996)

Awards
- 2× SEC Coach of the Year (1991, 1995)

Richard Williams (born August 22, 1945) is a former American basketball coach. He most recently served as a special assistant to the head coach at Southern Miss.

== Early life ==
Williams was born in Vicksburg, Mississippi and attended Mississippi State University as a freshman in 1963. Williams began his coaching career as a volunteer coach for seventh grade basketball while working as a math teacher. He worked in a variety of positions in coaching in schools such as Montelbello Junior High and South Natchez. He served as a part-time coach on the staff of Bob Boyd beginning in 1984.

== Coaching career ==
Williams was hired in March 1986. He served as the head men's basketball coach at Mississippi State University through the 1997–98 season, compiling a record of 191–163. His 191 victories are the second most of any head coach in Mississippi State Bulldogs men's basketball program, history, bested only by his former assistant, Rick Stansbury. Williams's 1991 squad won the Southeastern Conference regular season championship and made the 1991 NCAA Division I men's basketball tournament for the first time since 1963 and just second time in school history, where they lost in the first round to Eastern Michigan.

His 1995 squad made the Sweet Sixteen of the NCAA Tournament, but his 1996 squad would go further. The Bulldogs won the 1996 SEC men's basketball tournament with an 84-73 victory over Kentucky (who had not lost an SEC game all season) to win their first SEC title and first overall conference tournament since 1923. Playing as a 5 seed in the Southeast Region of the Division I tournament, they beat 12-seed VCU 58–51 and 13-seed Princeton 63–41 to face the #1 seed Connecticut in the Sweet Sixteen. They won 60–55 to set their first Elite Eight matchup against #2 seed Cincinnati. They beat the Bearcats 73-63 to win the Regional championship. In the Final Four, they were matched against Syracuse, who beat them 77–69. The team was the first (and currently only) team from the state of Mississippi to reach the Final Four of the NCAA Division I Tournament. He received two SEC Coach of the Year awards.

On March 12, 1998, Williams resigned as the head coach at Mississippi State two years removed from his Final Four appearance, citing burnout.

After leaving Mississippi State, Williams coached the Memphis Houn'Dawgs of the American Basketball Association (ABA), the Jackson Rage of the World Basketball Association (WBA), and at his alma mater, Pearl High School in Pearl, Mississippi. He served as the director of basketball administration at the University of Alabama at Birmingham (UAB) in 2008 and in 2009 he was named the director of basketball administration and program coordinator for the Louisiana Tech Bulldogs basketball team on a volunteer basis. Williams was an assistant coach for Arkansas State under John Brady from 2010 to 2014. Williams served as the color commentator for the Mississippi State basketball team's radio broadcasts from the 2014–15 season through the 2019–2020 season.

== Head coaching record ==
=== College ===
Record table
Season	Team	Overall	Conference	Standing	Postseason
Mississippi State Bulldogs (Southeastern Conference) (1986–1998)
1986–87	Mississippi State	7–21	3–15	10th	
1987–88	Mississippi State	14–15	6–12	10th	
1988–89	Mississippi State	13–15	7–11	8th	
1989–90	Mississippi State	16–14	7–11	T–8th	NIT Second Round
1990–91	Mississippi State	20–9	13–5	T–2nd	NCAA Division I First Round
1991–92	Mississippi State	15–13	7–9	4th (West)	
1992–93	Mississippi State	13–16	5–11	5th (West)	
1993–94	Mississippi State	18–11	9–7	3rd (West)	NIT First Round
1994–95	Mississippi State	22–8	12–4	T–1st (West)	NCAA Division I Sweet 16
1995–96	Mississippi State	26–8	10–6	T–1st (West)	NCAA Division I Final Four
1996–97	Mississippi State	12–18	6–10	T–3rd (West)	
1997–98	Mississippi State	15–15	4–12	5th (West)	
Mississippi State:		191–163 (.540)	89–113 (.441)		
Total:		191–163 (.540)			
National champion Postseason invitational champion Conference regular season champion Conference regular season and conference tournament champion Division regular season champion Division regular season and conference tournament champion Conference tournament champion

== See also ==
- List of NCAA Division I Men's Final Four appearances by coach
