= 1995–96 NCAA Division I men's basketball season =

Basketball season

- Preseason AP No. 1: Kentucky Wildcats
- Regular season: November 1995 – April 1996
- NCAA Tournament: 1996
- Tournament dates: March 14 – April 1, 1996
- National Championship: Continental Airlines Arena; East Rutherford, New Jersey
- NCAA Champions: Kentucky Wildcats
- Other champions: Nebraska Cornhuskers (NIT)
- Player of the Year (Naismith, Wooden): Marcus Camby, Massachusetts Minutemen

The 1995–96 NCAA Division I men's basketball season began in November 1995 and concluded with the 64-team 1996 NCAA Division I men's basketball tournament, whose finals were held at the Continental Airlines Arena in East Rutherford, New Jersey. The Kentucky Wildcats earned their sixth national championship by defeating the Syracuse Orangemen 76–67 on April 1, 1996. They were coached by Rick Pitino, and the NCAA basketball tournament Most Outstanding Player was Kentucky's Tony Delk.

In the 32-team 1996 National Invitation Tournament, the Nebraska Cornhuskers defeated the Saint Joseph's Hawks at Madison Square Garden in New York City.

Following the season, the 1996 NCAA Men's Basketball All-American Consensus First Team included Ray Allen, Marcus Camby, Tony Delk, Tim Duncan, Allen Iverson, and Kerry Kittles.

== Season headlines ==
- Conference USA began play, with 11 original members. It was formed prior to the season by the merger of the Great Midwest Conference and the Metro Conference.
- Head coach Rick Pitino led the Kentucky Wildcats to their sixth national championship, his first.
- The American West Conference, Big Eight Conference, and Southwest Conference disbanded at the end of the season.

== Pre-season polls ==
The top 25 from the pre-season AP Poll.

Associated Press
Ranking	Team
1	Kentucky
2	Kansas
3	Villanova
4	UCLA
5	Georgetown
6	Connecticut
7	Massachusetts
8	Iowa
9	Mississippi State
10	Utah
11	Wake Forest
12	Louisville
13	Memphis
14	Missouri
15	Maryland
16	Arkansas
17	Michigan
18	Stanford
19	Virginia
20	North Carolina
21	Cincinnati
22	Virginia Tech
23	Indiana
24	Purdue
25	California

== Conference membership changes ==
These schools joined new conferences for the 1995–96 season.

School	Former conference	New conference
Alabama–Birmingham (UAB) Blazers	Great Midwest Conference	Conference USA
Charlotte 49ers	Metro Conference	Conference USA
Cincinnati Bearcats	Great Midwest Conference	Conference USA
Dayton Flyers	Great Midwest Conference	Atlantic 10 Conference
DePaul Blue Demons	Great Midwest Conference	Conference USA
Fordham Rams	Patriot League	Atlantic 10 Conference
Hampton Pirates	CIAA (D-II)	Mid-Eastern Athletic Conference
Jacksonville State Gamecocks	NCAA Division II independent	Trans America Athletic Conference
La Salle Explorers	Midwestern Collegiate Conference	Atlantic 10 Conference
Louisville Cardinals	Metro Conference	Conference USA
Marquette Golden Eagles	Great Midwest Conference	Conference USA
Memphis Tigers	Great Midwest Conference	Conference USA
Notre Dame Fighting Irish	NCAA Division I independent	Big East Conference
Rutgers Scarlet Knights	Atlantic 10 Conference	Big East Conference
Saint Louis Billikens	Great Midwest Conference	Conference USA
South Florida Bulls	Metro Conference	Conference USA
Southern Miss Golden Eagles	Metro Conference	Conference USA
Towson Tigers	Big South Conference	North Atlantic Conference
Tulane Green Wave	Metro Conference	Conference USA
Virginia Commonwealth (VCU) Rams	Metro Conference	Colonial Athletic Association
Virginia Tech Hokies	Metro Conference	Atlantic 10 Conference
West Virginia Mountaineers	Atlantic 10 Conference	Big East Conference
Wofford Terriers	NCAA Division II independent	NCAA Division I independent
Xavier Musketeers	Midwestern Collegiate Conference	Atlantic 10 Conference

== Regular season ==
=== Conferences ===
==== Conference winners and tournaments ====
Twenty-nine conferences concluded their seasons with a single-elimination tournament, with only the Big Ten Conference, Ivy League and Pac-10 Conference choosing not to conduct conference tournaments. Since Penn and Princeton finished tied for the Ivy League regular-season title, the conference staged a one-game playoff between the teams at a neutral site to determine which school received the league's automatic bid to the 1996 NCAA Division I men's basketball tournament. Conference tournament winners, with the exception of those of the American West Conference and Conference USA, received an automatic bid to the NCAA tournament.

Conference	Regular season winner	Conference player of the year	Conference tournament	Tournament venue (City)	Tournament winner
American West Conference	Cal Poly	Ben Larson, Cal Poly	1996 American West Conference men's basketball tournament	Matadome (Northridge, California)	Southern Utah
Atlantic 10 Conference	UMass (East); George Washington (West); Virginia Tech (West)	Marcus Camby, UMass	1996 Atlantic 10 men's basketball tournament	Philadelphia Civic Center (Philadelphia, Pennsylvania)	UMass
Atlantic Coast Conference	Georgia Tech	Tim Duncan, Wake Forest	1996 ACC men's basketball tournament	Greensboro Coliseum (Greensboro, North Carolina)	Wake Forest
Big East Conference	Connecticut (Big East 6); Georgetown (Big East 7)	Ray Allen, Connecticut	1997 Big East men's basketball tournament	Madison Square Garden (New York City, New York)	Connecticut
Big Eight Conference	Kansas	Jacque Vaughn, Kansas	1996 Big Eight Conference men's basketball tournament	Kemper Arena (Kansas City, Missouri)	Iowa State
Big Sky Conference	Montana State	Jimmy DeGraffenried, Weber State; Quadre Lollis, Montana State	1996 Big Sky Conference men's basketball tournament	Brick Breeden Fieldhouse (Bozeman, Montana)	Montana State
Big South Conference	UNC Greensboro	T. L. Latson, Charleston Southern	1996 Big South Conference men's basketball tournament	Vines Center (Lynchburg, Virginia)	UNC Greensboro
Big Ten Conference	Purdue	Brian Evans, Indiana	No Tournament		
Big West Conference	Long Beach State	Raimonds Miglinieks, UC Irvine	1997 Big West Conference men's basketball tournament	Lawlor Events Center (Reno, Nevada)	San Jose State
Colonial Athletic Association	VCU	Bernard Hopkins, VCU	1996 CAA men's basketball tournament	Richmond Coliseum (Richmond, Virginia)	VCU
Conference USA	Cincinnati (Blue); Tulane (Red); Memphis (White)	Danny Fortson, Cincinnati	1996 Conference USA men's basketball tournament	Memphis Pyramid (Memphis, Tennessee)	Cincinnati
Ivy League	Penn; Princeton	Ira Bowman, Penn	One-game tiebreaker playoff	Stabler Arena (Bethlehem, Pennsylvania)	Princeton
Metro Atlantic Athletic Conference	Fairfield; Iona	Darrell Barley, Canisius	1996 MAAC men's basketball tournament	Knickerbocker Arena (Albany, New York)	Canisius
Mid-American Conference	Eastern Michigan	Bonzi Wells, Ball State	1996 MAC men's basketball tournament	SeaGate Convention Centre (Toledo, Ohio)	Eastern Michigan
Mid-Continent Conference	Valparaiso	Anthony Allison, Valparaiso	1996 Mid-Continent Conference men's basketball tournament	The MARK of the Quad Cities (Moline, Illinois)	Valparaiso
Mid-Eastern Athletic Conference	Coppin State	Terquin Mott, Coppin State	1997 MEAC men's basketball tournament	Leon County Civic Center (Tallahassee, Florida)	South Carolina State
Midwestern Collegiate Conference	Green Bay	Jeff Nordgaard, Green Bay	1996 MCC men's basketball tournament	Nutter Center (Dayton, Ohio)	Northern Illinois
Missouri Valley Conference	Bradley	Anthony Parker, Bradley	1996 Missouri Valley Conference men's basketball tournament	Kiel Center (St. Louis, Missouri)	Tulsa
North Atlantic Conference	Drexel	Malik Rose, Drexel	1996 North Atlantic Conference men's basketball tournament	Daskalakis Athletic Center (Philadelphia, Pennsylvania)	Drexel
Northeast Conference	Mount St. Mary's	Chris McGuthrie, Mount St. Mary's	1996 Northeast Conference men's basketball tournament	William T. Boylan Gymnasium (West Long Branch, New Jersey)	Monmouth
Ohio Valley Conference	Murray State	Marcus Brown, Murray State	1996 Ohio Valley Conference men's basketball tournament	Nashville Municipal Auditorium (Nashville, Tennessee)	Austin Peay
Pacific-10 Conference	Arizona	Shareef Abdur-Rahim, California	No Tournament		
Patriot League	Colgate; Navy	Adonal Foyle, Colgate	1996 Patriot League men's basketball tournament	Cotterell Court (Hamilton, New York)	Colgate
Southeastern Conference	Kentucky (East); Mississippi State (West)	Tony Delk, Kentucky	1996 SEC men's basketball tournament	Louisiana Superdome (New Orleans, Louisiana)	Mississippi State
Southern Conference	Davidson (North); Western Carolina (South)	Anquell McCollum, Western Carolina	1996 Southern Conference men's basketball tournament	Greensboro Coliseum (Greensboro, North Carolina)	Western Carolina
Southland Conference	Louisiana–Monroe	Paul Marshall, Louisiana–Monroe	1996 Southland Conference men's basketball tournament	Hirsch Memorial Coliseum (Shreveport, Louisiana)	Louisiana–Monroe
Southwest Conference	Texas Tech	Jason Sasser, Texas Tech	1996 Southwest Conference men's basketball tournament	Reunion Arena (Dallas, Texas)	Texas Tech
Southwestern Athletic Conference	Jackson State; Mississippi Valley State	Marcus Mann, Mississippi Valley State	1997 SWAC men's basketball tournament	—	Mississippi Valley State
Sun Belt Conference	Little Rock; New Orleans	Derek Fisher, Little Rock	1996 Sun Belt men's basketball tournament	Barton Coliseum (Little Rock, Arkansas)	New Orleans
Trans America Athletic Conference	College of Charleston (East); Samford (West); Southeastern Louisiana (West)	Thaddeus Delaney, College of Charleston	1996 TAAC men's basketball tournament	Edmunds Center (DeLand, Florida)	UCF
West Coast Conference	Gonzaga; Santa Clara	Steve Nash, Santa Clara	1996 West Coast Conference men's basketball tournament	Toso Pavilion (Santa Clara, California)	Portland
Western Athletic Conference	Utah	Keith Van Horn, Utah	1996 WAC men's basketball tournament	The Pit (Albuquerque, New Mexico)	New Mexico

==== Conference standings ====
1995–96 American West Conference men's basketball standings
	Conf.				Overall
Team	W		L	PCT	W		L	PCT
Cal Poly	5	–	1	.833	16	–	13	.552
Southern Utah†	3	–	3	.500	15	–	13	.536
Cal State Northridge	2	–	4	.333	7	–	20	.259
Sacramento State	2	–	4	.333	7	–	20	.259
† 1996 American West tournament winner Rankings from AP poll

1995–96 ACC men's basketball standings
	Conf.				Overall
Team	W		L	PCT	W		L	PCT
No. 13 Georgia Tech	13	–	3	.813	24	–	12	.667
No. 9 Wake Forest †	12	–	4	.750	26	–	6	.813
No. 25 North Carolina	10	–	6	.625	21	–	11	.656
Duke	8	–	8	.500	18	–	13	.581
Maryland	8	–	8	.500	17	–	13	.567
Clemson	7	–	9	.438	18	–	11	.621
Virginia	6	–	10	.375	12	–	15	.444
Florida State	5	–	11	.313	13	–	14	.481
NC State	3	–	13	.188	15	–	16	.484
† 1996 ACC tournament winner Rankings from AP poll

1995–96 Atlantic 10 men's basketball standings
	Conf.				Overall
Team	W		L	PCT	W		L	PCT
East
No. 1 UMass †	15	–	1	.938	35	–	2	.946
Temple	12	–	4	.750	20	–	13	.606
Saint Joseph's	9	–	7	.563	19	–	13	.594
Rhode Island	8	–	8	.500	20	–	14	.588
St. Bonaventure	4	–	12	.250	10	–	18	.357
Fordham	2	–	14	.125	4	–	23	.148
West
No. 22 Virginia Tech	13	–	3	.813	23	–	6	.793
George Washington	13	–	3	.813	21	–	8	.724
Xavier	8	–	8	.500	13	–	15	.464
Dayton	6	–	10	.375	15	–	14	.517
Duquesne	3	–	13	.188	9	–	18	.333
La Salle	3	–	13	.188	6	–	24	.200
† 1996 Atlantic 10 Tournament winner Rankings from AP Poll

1995–96 Big East men's basketball standings
	Conf.				Overall
Team	W		L	PCT	W		L	PCT
Big East 6
No. 3 Connecticut†*	17	–	1	.944	30	–	2	.938
No. 10 Villanova	14	–	4	.778	26	–	7	.788
Boston College	10	–	8	.556	19	–	11	.633
West Virginia	7	–	11	.389	12	–	15	.444
St. John's	5	–	13	.278	11	–	16	.407
Notre Dame	4	–	14	.222	9	–	18	.333
Big East 7
No. 4 Georgetown	13	–	5	.722	29	–	8	.784
No. 15 Syracuse	12	–	6	.667	29	–	9	.763
Providence	9	–	9	.500	18	–	12	.600
Miami	8	–	10	.444	15	–	13	.536
Seton Hall	7	–	11	.389	12	–	16	.429
Rutgers	6	–	12	.333	9	–	18	.333
Pittsburgh	5	–	13	.278	10	–	17	.370
† 1996 Big East tournament winner As of April 1, 1996; *Connecticut's three NCAA Tournament games were vacated due to sanctions against the program; Connecticut′s disputed record was 32–3, 17–1. Rankings from AP Poll

1995–96 Big Eight Conference men's basketball standings
	Conf.				Overall
Team	W		L	PCT	W		L	PCT
No. 4 Kansas	12	–	2	.857	29	–	5	.853
No. 17 Iowa State †	9	–	5	.643	24	–	9	.727
Oklahoma (Note: Adjusted from 17–13 as Purdue forfeited 18 wins)	8	–	6	.571	18	–	12	.600
Kansas State	7	–	7	.500	17	–	12	.586
Oklahoma State	7	–	7	.500	17	–	10	.630
Missouri	6	–	8	.429	18	–	15	.545
Nebraska	4	–	10	.286	21	–	14	.600
Colorado	3	–	11	.214	9	–	18	.333
† 1996 Big Eight tournament winner Rankings from AP Poll

1995–96 Big Sky men's basketball standings
	Conf.				Overall
Team	W		L	PCT	W		L	PCT
Montana State †	11	–	3	.786	21	–	9	.700
Weber State	10	–	4	.714	20	–	10	.667
Montana	10	–	4	.714	20	–	8	.714
Boise State	10	–	4	.714	15	–	13	.536
Idaho State	7	–	7	.500	11	–	15	.423
Idaho	5	–	9	.357	12	–	16	.429
Northern Arizona	3	–	11	.214	6	–	20	.231
Eastern Washington	0	–	14	.000	3	–	23	.115
† 1996 Big Sky tournament winner

1995–96 Big South Conference men's basketball standings
	Conf.				Overall
Team	W		L	PCT	W		L	PCT
UNC Greensboro †	11	–	3	.786	20	–	10	.667
Liberty	9	–	5	.643	17	–	12	.586
UNC Asheville	9	–	5	.643	18	–	10	.643
Charleston Southern	9	–	5	.643	15	–	13	.536
Radford	8	–	6	.571	14	–	13	.519
Winthrop	6	–	8	.429	7	–	19	.269
UMBC	3	–	11	.214	5	–	22	.185
Coastal Carolina	1	–	13	.071	5	–	21	.192
† 1996 Big South tournament winner Rankings from AP Poll

1995–96 Big Ten Conference men's basketball standings
	Conf.				Overall
Team	W		L	PCT	W		L	PCT
Indiana (Note: Indiana adjusted from 12–6, 19–12)	13	–	5	.722	20	–	11	.645
No. 18 Penn State	12	–	6	.667	21	–	7	.750
No. 21 Iowa (Note: Iowa adjusted from 11–7, 23–9)	12	–	6	.667	24	–	8	.750
Minnesota (Note: Minnesota adjusted from 10–8, 19–13 (vacated 2 games))	11	–	7	.611	20	–	10	.667
Wisconsin (Note: Wisconsin adjusted from 8–10, 17–15)	9	–	9	.500	18	–	14	.563
Michigan State	9	–	9	.500	16	–	16	.500
Illinois	7	–	11	.389	18	–	13	.581
No. 4 Purdue (Note: Purdue adjusted from 15–3, 26–6 (forfeit 18 wins, vacated 2 games))	6	–	12	.333	7	–	23	.233
Ohio State (Note: Ohio State adjusted from 3–15, 10–17)	5	–	13	.278	12	–	15	.444
Northwestern (Note: Northwestern adjusted from 2–16, 7–20)	4	–	14	.222	9	–	18	.333
Michigan (Note: Michigan adjusted from 10–8/21–11 (vacated 21 games))	1	–	8	.111	1	–	10	.091
Rankings from AP Poll; Records above are after NCAA sanctions against Minnesota, Purdue, and Michigan as noted:

1995–96 Big West men's basketball standings
	Conf.				Overall
Team	W		L	PCT	W		L	PCT
Long Beach State	12	–	6	.667	17	–	11	.607
Pacific	11	–	7	.611	15	–	12	.556
UC Irvine	11	–	7	.611	15	–	12	.556
Utah State	10	–	8	.556	18	–	15	.545
Nevada	9	–	9	.500	16	–	13	.552
San Jose State†	9	–	9	.500	13	–	17	.433
New Mexico State	8	–	10	.444	11	–	15	.423
UC Santa Barbara	8	–	10	.444	11	–	15	.423
UNLV	7	–	11	.389	10	–	16	.385
Cal State Fullerton	5	–	13	.278	6	–	20	.231
† 1996 Big West tournament winner Rankings from AP poll

1995–96 CAA men's basketball standings
	Conf.				Overall
Team	W		L	PCT	W		L	PCT
VCU†	14	–	2	.875	24	–	9	.727
Old Dominion	12	–	4	.750	18	–	13	.581
UNC Wilmington	9	–	7	.563	13	–	16	.448
American	8	–	8	.500	12	–	15	.444
East Carolina	8	–	8	.500	17	–	11	.607
William & Mary	6	–	10	.375	10	–	16	.385
James Madison	6	–	10	.375	10	–	20	.333
George Mason	6	–	10	.375	11	–	16	.407
Richmond	3	–	13	.188	8	–	20	.286
† 1996 CAA tournament winner Rankings from AP poll

1995–96 Conference USA men's basketball standings
	Conf.				Overall
Team	W		L	PCT	W		L	PCT
Blue
No. 7 Cincinnati †	11	–	3	.786	28	–	5	.848
No. 20 Marquette	10	–	4	.714	23	–	8	.742
Saint Louis	4	–	10	.286	16	–	14	.533
DePaul	2	–	12	.143	11	–	18	.379
Red
Tulane	9	–	5	.643	22	–	10	.688
UAB	6	–	8	.429	16	–	14	.533
Southern Miss	6	–	8	.429	12	–	15	.444
South Florida	2	–	12	.143	12	–	16	.429
White
No. 16 Memphis	11	–	3	.786	22	–	8	.733
No. 24 Louisville	10	–	4	.714	22	–	12	.647
UNC Charlotte	6	–	8	.429	14	–	15	.483
† 1996 Conference USA Tournament winner Rankings from AP Poll

1995–96 Ivy League men's basketball standings
	Conf.				Overall
Team	W		L	PCT	W		L	PCT
Princeton	12	–	2	.857	22	–	7	.759
Penn	12	–	2	.857	17	–	10	.630
Dartmouth	9	–	5	.643	16	–	10	.615
Harvard	7	–	7	.500	15	–	11	.577
Brown	5	–	9	.357	10	–	16	.385
Cornell	5	–	9	.357	10	–	16	.385
Yale	3	–	11	.214	8	–	18	.308
Columbia	3	–	11	.214	7	–	19	.269
Rankings from AP Poll

1995–96 MAAC men's basketball standings
	Conf.				Overall
Team	W		L	PCT	W		L	PCT
Iona	10	–	4	.714	21	–	8	.724
Fairfield	10	–	4	.714	20	–	10	.667
Manhattan	9	–	5	.643	17	–	12	.586
Loyola (MD)	8	–	6	.571	12	–	15	.444
Canisius †	7	–	7	.500	19	–	11	.633
Niagara	6	–	8	.429	13	–	15	.464
Saint Peter's	5	–	9	.357	15	–	12	.556
Siena	1	–	13	.071	5	–	22	.185
† 1996 MAAC tournament winner

1995–96 Mid-American Conference men's basketball standings
	Conf.				Overall
Team	W		L	PCT	W		L	PCT
Eastern Michigan †	14	–	4	.778	25	–	6	.806
Western Michigan	13	–	5	.722	15	–	12	.556
Miami	12	–	6	.667	21	–	8	.724
Ohio	11	–	7	.611	16	–	14	.533
Ball State	11	–	7	.611	16	–	12	.571
Bowling Green	9	–	9	.500	14	–	13	.519
Toledo	9	–	9	.500	18	–	14	.563
Kent State	8	–	10	.444	14	–	13	.519
Central Michigan	3	–	15	.167	6	–	20	.231
Akron	0	–	18	.000	3	–	23	.115
† 1996 MAC tournament winner Rankings from AP Poll

1995–96 Mid-Continent Conference men's basketball standings
	Conf.				Overall
Team	W		L	PCT	W		L	PCT
Valparaiso †	13	–	5	.722	21	–	11	.656
Western Illinois	12	–	6	.667	17	–	12	.586
Missouri–Kansas City	10	–	8	.556	12	–	15	.444
Buffalo	10	–	8	.556	13	–	14	.481
Northeastern Illinois	10	–	8	.556	14	–	13	.519
Eastern Illinois	9	–	9	.500	13	–	15	.464
Central Connecticut State	9	–	9	.500	13	–	15	.464
Troy State	8	–	10	.444	11	–	16	.407
Youngstown State	7	–	11	.389	12	–	15	.444
Chicago State	2	–	16	.111	2	–	25	.074
† 1996 Mid-Con Tournament winner Rankings from AP Poll

1995–96 MEAC men's basketball standings
	Conf.				Overall
Team	W		L	PCT	W		L	PCT
South Carolina State †	14	–	2	.875	22	–	8	.733
Coppin State	14	–	2	.875	19	–	10	.655
Bethune–Cookman	8	–	8	.500	12	–	15	.444
Delaware State	8	–	8	.500	11	–	17	.393
North Carolina A&T	7	–	9	.438	10	–	17	.370
Maryland Eastern Shore	6	–	10	.375	11	–	16	.407
Howard	6	–	10	.375	7	–	20	.259
Morgan State	6	–	10	.375	7	–	20	.259
Florida A&M	3	–	13	.188	8	–	19	.296
Hampton	0	–	0	–	9	–	17	.346
† 1996 MEAC tournament winner Rankings from AP Poll

1995–96 Midwestern Collegiate Conference men's basketball standings
	Conf.				Overall
Team	W		L	PCT	W		L	PCT
Green Bay	16	–	0	1.000	25	–	4	.862
Butler	12	–	4	.750	19	–	8	.704
Northern Illinois †	12	–	4	.750	19	–	8	.704
Wright State	8	–	8	.500	14	–	13	.519
Detroit	8	–	8	.500	18	–	11	.621
Milwaukee	5	–	11	.313	9	–	18	.333
UIC	5	–	11	.313	10	–	18	.357
Loyola (IL)	5	–	11	.313	8	–	19	.296
Cleveland State	3	–	13	.188	5	–	21	.192
† 1996 MCC tournament winner As of March 5, 1996; Rankings from AP poll

1995–96 Missouri Valley Conference men's basketball standings
	Conf.				Overall
Team	W		L	PCT	W		L	PCT
Bradley	15	–	3	.833	22	–	8	.733
Illinois State	13	–	5	.722	22	–	12	.647
Tulsa †	12	–	6	.667	22	–	8	.733
Southwest Missouri State	11	–	7	.611	16	–	12	.571
Creighton	9	–	9	.500	14	–	15	.483
Evansville	9	–	9	.500	13	–	14	.481
Northern Iowa	8	–	10	.444	14	–	13	.519
Drake	8	–	10	.444	12	–	15	.444
Indiana State	6	–	12	.333	10	–	16	.385
Wichita State	4	–	14	.222	8	–	21	.276
Southern Illinois	4	–	14	.222	11	–	18	.379
† 1996 MVC tournament winner Rankings from AP Poll

1995–96 North Atlantic Conference men's basketball standings
	Conf.				Overall
Team	W		L	PCT	W		L	PCT
Drexel †	17	–	1	.944	27	–	4	.871
Boston University	13	–	5	.722	18	–	11	.621
Maine	11	–	7	.611	15	–	13	.536
Delaware	11	–	7	.611	15	–	12	.556
Towson State	11	–	7	.611	16	–	12	.571
Vermont	10	–	8	.556	12	–	15	.444
Hofstra	5	–	13	.278	9	–	18	.333
New Hampshire	5	–	13	.278	6	–	21	.222
Hartford	5	–	13	.278	6	–	22	.214
Northeastern	2	–	16	.111	4	–	24	.143
† 1996 NAC tournament winner Rankings from AP poll

1995–96 Northeast Conference men's basketball standings
	Conf.				Overall
Team	W		L	PCT	W		L	PCT
Mount St. Mary's	16	–	2	.889	21	–	8	.724
Marist	14	–	4	.778	22	–	7	.759
Monmouth †	14	–	4	.778	20	–	10	.667
Rider	12	–	6	.667	19	–	11	.633
Saint Francis (PA)	11	–	7	.611	13	–	14	.481
Wagner	7	–	11	.389	10	–	17	.370
Fairleigh Dickinson	6	–	12	.333	7	–	20	.259
Long Island	5	–	13	.278	9	–	19	.321
St. Francis Brooklyn	3	–	15	.167	9	–	18	.333
Robert Morris	2	–	16	.111	5	–	23	.179
† 1996 NEC tournament winner

1995–96 Ohio Valley Conference men's basketball standings
	Conf.				Overall
Team	W		L	PCT	W		L	PCT
Murray State	12	–	4	.750	19	–	10	.655
Tennessee State	11	–	5	.688	15	–	13	.536
Austin Peay †	10	–	6	.625	19	–	11	.633
Middle Tennessee	9	–	7	.563	15	–	12	.556
UT Martin	9	–	7	.563	13	–	14	.481
Tennessee Tech	7	–	9	.438	13	–	15	.464
Eastern Kentucky	7	–	9	.438	13	–	14	.481
Southeast Missouri State	5	–	11	.313	8	–	19	.296
Morehead State	2	–	14	.125	7	–	20	.259
† 1996 OVC tournament winner Rankings from AP Poll

1995–96 Pacific-10 Conference men's basketball standings
	Conf.				Overall
Team	W		L	PCT	W		L	PCT
No. 14 UCLA	16	–	2	.889	23	–	8	.742
No. 11 Arizona	14	–	4	.778	27	–	6	.818
Stanford	12	–	6	.667	21	–	8	.724
Washington State	9	–	9	.500	18	–	11	.621
Washington	9	–	9	.500	16	–	12	.571
Oregon	9	–	9	.500	16	–	13	.552
USC	6	–	12	.333	13	–	17	.433
Arizona State	6	–	12	.333	11	–	16	.407
Oregon State	4	–	14	.222	6	–	21	.222
California^{1}	2	–	16	.111	2	–	26	.071
As of November 23, 2011; Rankings from AP Poll^{1}California forfeited games due to infractions.

1995–96 Patriot League men's basketball standings
	Conf.				Overall
Team	W		L	PCT	W		L	PCT
Colgate †	9	–	3	.750	15	–	15	.500
Navy	9	–	3	.750	15	–	12	.556
Holy Cross	8	–	4	.667	16	–	13	.552
Bucknell	8	–	4	.667	17	–	11	.607
Lafayette	4	–	8	.333	7	–	20	.259
Lehigh	2	–	10	.167	4	–	23	.148
Army	2	–	10	.167	7	–	20	.259
† 1996 Patriot League tournament winner

1995–96 Southeastern Conference men's basketball standings
	Conf.				Overall
Team	W		L	PCT	W		L	PCT
East
No. 2 Kentucky	16	–	0	1.000	34	–	2	.944
Georgia	9	–	7	.563	21	–	10	.677
South Carolina	8	–	8	.500	19	–	12	.613
Vanderbilt	7	–	9	.438	18	–	14	.563
Florida	6	–	10	.375	12	–	16	.429
Tennessee	6	–	10	.375	14	–	15	.483
West
No. 19 Mississippi State †	10	–	6	.625	26	–	8	.765
Arkansas	9	–	7	.563	20	–	13	.606
Alabama	9	–	7	.563	19	–	13	.594
Ole Miss	6	–	10	.375	12	–	15	.444
Auburn	6	–	10	.375	19	–	13	.594
LSU	4	–	12	.250	12	–	17	.414
† 1996 SEC tournament winner Rankings from AP Poll

1995–96 Southern Conference men's basketball standings
	Conf.				Overall
Team	W		L	PCT	W		L	PCT
North
Davidson	14	–	0	1.000	25	–	5	.833
VMI	10	–	4	.714	18	–	10	.643
Marshall	8	–	6	.571	17	–	11	.607
East Tennessee State	3	–	11	.214	7	–	20	.259
Appalachian State	3	–	11	.214	8	–	21	.276
South
Western Carolina †	10	–	4	.714	17	–	13	.567
Chattanooga	9	–	5	.643	15	–	12	.556
Furman	6	–	8	.429	10	–	17	.370
The Citadel	5	–	9	.357	10	–	16	.385
Georgia Southern	2	–	12	.143	3	–	23	.115
† SoCon Tournament winner As of April 30, 1996; Rankings from AP poll

1995–96 Southland Conference men's basketball standings
	Conf.				Overall
Team	W		L	PCT	W		L	PCT
Northeast Louisiana †	13	–	5	.722	16	–	14	.533
North Texas	12	–	6	.667	15	–	13	.536
UTSA	12	–	6	.667	14	–	14	.500
Stephen F. Austin	11	–	7	.611	17	–	11	.607
McNeese State	11	–	7	.611	15	–	12	.556
Sam Houston State	9	–	9	.500	11	–	16	.407
Southwest Texas State	7	–	11	.389	11	–	15	.423
Texas–Arlington	7	–	11	.389	11	–	15	.423
Nicholls State	5	–	13	.278	5	–	21	.192
Northwestern State	3	–	15	.167	5	–	21	.192
† 1996 Southland tournament winner Rankings from AP Poll

1995–96 Southwest Conference men's basketball standings
	Conf.				Overall
Team	W		L	PCT	W		L	PCT
No. 8 Texas Tech †	14	–	0	1.000	30	–	2	.938
Houston	11	–	3	.786	17	–	10	.630
Texas	10	–	4	.714	21	–	10	.677
TCU	6	–	8	.429	15	–	15	.500
Rice	5	–	9	.357	14	–	14	.500
Texas A&M	3	–	11	.214	11	–	16	.407
SMU	3	–	11	.214	8	–	20	.286
Baylor	4	–	10	.286	9	–	18	.333
† 1996 SWC tournament winner Rankings from AP Poll

1995–96 SWAC men's basketball standings
	Conf.				Overall
Team	W		L	PCT	W		L	PCT
Mississippi Valley State †	11	–	3	.786	22	–	7	.759
Jackson State	11	–	3	.786	16	–	13	.552
Southern	9	–	5	.643	17	–	11	.607
Texas Southern	7	–	7	.500	11	–	15	.423
Alcorn State	7	–	7	.500	10	–	15	.400
Grambling	6	–	8	.429	12	–	16	.429
Alabama State	5	–	9	.357	9	–	18	.333
Prairie View A&M	0	–	14	.000	4	–	23	.148
† 1996 SWAC tournament winner Rankings from AP Poll

1995–96 Sun Belt Conference men's basketball standings
	Conf.				Overall
Team	W		L	PCT	W		L	PCT
New Orleans †	14	–	4	.778	21	–	9	.700
Arkansas–Little Rock	14	–	4	.778	23	–	7	.767
Jacksonville	10	–	8	.556	15	–	13	.536
Western Kentucky	10	–	8	.556	13	–	14	.481
Southwestern Louisiana	9	–	9	.500	16	–	12	.571
Lamar	7	–	11	.389	12	–	15	.444
South Alabama	7	–	11	.389	12	–	15	.444
Arkansas State	7	–	11	.389	9	–	18	.333
Louisiana Tech	6	–	12	.333	11	–	17	.393
Texas–Pan American	6	–	12	.333	9	–	19	.321
† 1996 Sun Belt Conference tournament winner Rankings from AP Poll

1995–96 Trans America Athletic Conference men's basketball standings
	Conf.				Overall
Team	W		L	PCT	W		L	PCT
East
College of Charleston	15	–	1	.938	25	–	4	.862
Campbell	11	–	5	.688	17	–	11	.607
Florida International	6	–	10	.375	13	–	15	.464
Stetson	6	–	10	.375	10	–	17	.370
Central Florida †	6	–	10	.375	11	–	19	.367
Florida Atlantic	5	–	11	.313	9	–	18	.333
West
Samford	11	–	5	.688	16	–	11	.593
Southeastern Louisiana	11	–	5	.688	15	–	12	.556
Centenary	8	–	8	.500	11	–	16	.407
Mercer	7	–	9	.438	15	–	14	.517
Georgia State	6	–	10	.375	10	–	16	.385
Jacksonville State	4	–	12	.250	10	–	17	.370
† 1996 TAAC tournament winner Rankings from AP poll

1995–96 West Coast Conference men's basketball standings
	Conf.				Overall
Team	W		L	PCT	W		L	PCT
Santa Clara	10	–	4	.714	20	–	9	.690
Gonzaga	10	–	4	.714	21	–	9	.700
Loyola Marymount	8	–	6	.571	18	–	11	.621
San Francisco	8	–	6	.571	15	–	12	.556
Portland †	7	–	7	.500	19	–	11	.633
San Diego	6	–	8	.429	14	–	14	.500
Saint Mary's	5	–	9	.357	12	–	15	.444
Pepperdine	2	–	12	.143	10	–	18	.357
† Conference tournament winner Rankings from AP poll

1995–96 WAC men's basketball standings
	Conf.				Overall
Team	W		L	PCT	W		L	PCT
No. 12 Utah	15	–	3	.833	27	–	7	.794
No. 23 New Mexico †	14	–	4	.778	28	–	5	.848
Fresno State	13	–	5	.722	22	–	11	.667
Colorado State	11	–	7	.611	18	–	12	.600
BYU	9	–	9	.500	15	–	13	.536
Wyoming	8	–	10	.444	14	–	15	.483
San Diego State	8	–	10	.444	15	–	14	.517
Hawaii	7	–	11	.389	10	–	18	.357
UTEP	4	–	14	.222	13	–	15	.464
Air Force	1	–	17	.056	5	–	23	.179
† 1996 WAC tournament winner Rankings from AP Poll

=== Division I independents ===
Two schools played as Division I independents. They had no postseason play.

1995–96 NCAA Division I men's basketball independents standings
	Conf.				Overall
Team	W		L	PCT	W		L	PCT
Oral Roberts	-	–	-	–	18	–	9	.667
Wofford	-	–	-	–	4	–	22	.154
Rankings from AP Poll

=== Informal championships ===
Conference	Regular season winner	Most Valuable Player
Philadelphia Big 5	Temple	Kerry Kittles, Villanova

For the fifth consecutive season, the Philadelphia Big 5 did not play a full round-robin schedule in which each team met each other team once, a format it had used from its first season of competition in 1955–56 through the 1990–91 season. Instead, each team played only two games against other Big 5 members, and Temple finished with a 2–0 record in head-to-head competition among the Big 5. The Big 5 did not revive its full round-robin schedule until the 1999–2000 season.

=== Statistical leaders ===
Source for additional stats categories

Points per game			Rebounds per game			Assists per game			Steals per game		
Player	School	PPG	Player	School	RPG	Player	School	APG	Player	School	SPG
Kevin Granger	TX Southern	27.0	Marcus Mann	Miss. Valley St.	13.6	Raimonds Miglinieks	UC Irvine	8.5	Pointer Williams	McNeese St.	4.4
Marcus Brown	Murray St.	26.4	Malik Rose	Drexel	13.2	Curtis McCants	George Mason	8.3	Johnny Rhodes	Maryland	3.7
Bubba Wells	Austin Peay	24.4	Adonal Foyle	Colgate	12.6	Dan Pogue	Campbell	8.0	Roderick Taylor	Jackson St.	3.7
Jafonde Williams	Hampton	25.7	Tim Duncan	Wake Forest	12.3	Pointer Williams	McNeese St.	7.4	Rasul Salahuddin	Long Beach St.	3.6
Bonzi Wells	Ball St.	25.4	Scott Farley	Mercer	12.0	Lazarus Sims	Syracuse	7.4	Andrell Hoard	Northeastern Illinois	3.6

Blocked shots per game			Field goal percentage			Three-point FG percentage			Free throw percentage		
Player	School	BPG	Player	School	FG%	Player	School	3FG%	Player	School	FT%
Keith Closs	C. Connecticut St.	6.4	Quadre Lollis	Montana State	.675	Mike Derockkis	Drexel	.477	Mike Dillard	Sam Houston St.	.926
Adonal Foyle	Colgate	5.7	Daniel Watts	Nevada	.656	Peter Lisicky	Penn State	.471	Dion Cross	Stanford	.920
Roy Rogers	Alabama	4.9	Link Abrams	Centenary	.654	Ray Allen	Connecticut	.466	Roderick Howard	Charlotte	.903
Jerome James	Florida A&M	4.4	Alexander Koul	George Washington	.642	Keith Veney	Marshall	.455	Geoff Billet	Rutgers	.900
Peter Aluma	Liberty	3.9	Terquin Mott	Coppin St.	.638	Tim Gill	Oral Roberts	.451	Steve Nash	Santa Clara	.894
Alan Tomidy	Marist										

== Postseason tournaments ==
=== NCAA tournament ===
==== Final Four – Meadowlands, East Rutherford, New Jersey ====
National semifinals
E1	Massachusetts	74
M1	Kentucky	81
SE5	Mississippi State	69
W4	Syracuse	77

National championship game
M1	Kentucky	76
W4	Syracuse	67

=== National Invitation tournament ===
==== Semifinals & finals ====
Semifinals
Tulane	78
Nebraska	90
Alabama	69
Saint Joseph's	74

Finals
Nebraska	60
Saint Joseph's	56
Third place
Tulane	87
Alabama	76

== Award winners ==
=== Consensus All-American teams ===
Consensus First Team
Player	Position	Class	Team
Ray Allen	G	Junior	Connecticut
Marcus Camby	C	Junior	Massachusetts
Tony Delk	G	Senior	Kentucky
Tim Duncan	C	Junior	Wake Forest
Allen Iverson	G	Sophomore	Georgetown
Kerry Kittles	G	Senior	Villanova

Consensus Second Team
Player	Position	Class	Team
Danny Fortson	F	Sophomore	Cincinnati
Keith Van Horn	F	Junior	Utah
Jacque Vaughn	G	Junior	Kansas
John Wallace	F	Senior	Syracuse
Lorenzen Wright	F/C	Sophomore	Memphis

=== Major player of the year awards ===
- Wooden Award: Marcus Camby, Massachusetts
- Naismith Award: Marcus Camby, Massachusetts
- Associated Press Player of the Year: Marcus Camby, Massachusetts
- NABC Player of the Year: Marcus Camby, Massachusetts
- Oscar Robertson Trophy (USBWA): Marcus Camby, Massachusetts
- Adolph Rupp Trophy: Marcus Camby, Massachusetts
- Sporting News Player of the Year: Marcus Camby, Massachusetts
- UPI College Basketball Player of the Year: Ray Allen, Connecticut

=== Major freshman of the year awards ===
- USBWA Freshman of the Year: No Award Given

=== Major coach of the year awards ===
- Associated Press Coach of the Year: Gene Keady, Purdue
- Henry Iba Award (USBWA): Gene Keady, Purdue
- NABC Coach of the Year: John Calipari, Massachusetts
- Naismith College Coach of the Year: John Calipari, Massachusetts
- Sporting News Coach of the Year: John Calipari, Massachusetts

=== Other major awards ===
- NABC Defensive Player of the Year: Tim Duncan, Wake Forest
- Frances Pomeroy Naismith Award (Best player under 6'0): Eddie Benton, Vermont
- Robert V. Geasey Trophy (Top player in Philadelphia Big 5): Kerry Kittles, Villanova
- NIT/Haggerty Award (Top player in New York City metro area): Adrian Griffin, Seton Hall

== Coaching changes ==
A number of teams changed coaches during the season and after it ended.

Team	Former Coach	Interim Coach	New Coach	Reason
Appalachian State	Tom Apke		Buzz Peterson	Peterson was hired from the Vanderbilt coaching staff.
Alabama State	John L. Williams		Rob Spivey	Spivey was hired from Division II Ashland.
Alcorn State	Sam Weaver		Davey Whitney	
Cal State Northridge	Pete Cassidy		Bobby Braswell	Cassidy was fired. Braswell was hired from the Oregon coaching staff.
California	Todd Bozeman		Ben Braun	Bozeman resigned.
Central Connecticut	Mark Adams		Howie Dickenman	Dickenman was hired from the Connecticut coaching staff.
Charleston Southern	Gary Edwards		Tom Conrad	Edwards stepped down and accepted head coaching duties at Division II Indiana University of Pennsylvania. Conrad was promoted from associate head coach.
Chicago State	Craig Hodges		Philip Gary	
Cleveland State	Mike Boyd		Rollie Massimino	Boyd resigned and accepted an assistant position on Penn State.
Colorado	Joe Harrington	Ricardo Patton		Resigned
Cornell	Al Walker		Scott Thompson	
Delaware State	Fred Goodman		Art Perry	Perry was hired from the Maryland coaching staff.
Drake	Rudy Washington		Kurt Kanaskie	Kanaskie was hired from Indiana University of Pennsylvania.
Eastern Michigan	Ben Braun		Milton Barnes	Braun left to coach California.
East Tennessee State	Alan LeForce		Ed DeChellis	DeChellis was hired from the Penn State coaching staff.
Florida	Lon Kruger		Billy Donovan	
Florida A&M	Ron Brown		Mickey Clayton	
Idaho	Joe Cravens		Kermit Davis	Cravens left to join the UC Irvine coaching staff.
Illinois	Lou Henson		Lon Kruger	Henson retired from coaching.
Kent State	Dave Grube		Gary Waters	Waters was hired from the Central Michigan coaching staff.
Lehigh	Dave Duke		Sal Mentesana	
Long Beach State	Seth Greenberg		Wayne Morgan	Greenberg left to coach South Florida. Morgan was hired from the Syracuse coaching staff.
Maine	Rudy Keeling		John Giannini	Keeling left to coach Northeastern. Giannini was hired from Division III Rowan.
Manhattan	Fran Fraschilla		John Leonard	Fraschilla left to coach St. John's. Leonard accepted the head coaching job of his alma mater.
Marshall	Billy Donovan		Greg White	Donovan left to coach Florida.
Maryland Eastern Shore	Jeff Menday		Lonnie Williams	
Miami (OH)	Herb Sendek		Charlie Coles	Sendek left to coach NC State. Coles was promoted from assistant.
Middle Tennessee	David Farrar		Randy Wiel	Farrar left to join the Idaho coaching staff.
Missouri–Kansas City	Lee Hunt		Bob Sundvold	Sundvold was a head coach with Division II Central Missouri State where he had three 20 win season in a row.
NC State	Les Robinson		Herb Sendek	Robinson stepped down as head coach and appointed athletic director.
New Hampshire	Gib Chapman		Jeff Jackson	Chapman was fired as head coach and let go from his men's athletic director duties. Jackson was hired from the Stanford coaching staff.
Northeastern	Dave Leitao		Rudy Keeling	Leitao resigned after a 4–24 season and going 22–35 in his two years.
Pepperdine	Tony Fuller	Marty Wilson	Lorenzo Romar	Fuller resigned in the middle of the season. Wilson took on interim duties and finished the season going 3–10. Romar was hired from the UCLA coaching staff.
Princeton	Pete Carril		Bill Carmody	Carril left to join the Sacramento Kings coaching staff. Carmody was promoted from assistant.
Robert Morris	Jarrett Durham		Jim Boone	
South Florida	Bobby Paschal		Seth Greenberg	
Southern	Ben Jobe		Tommie Green	Green promoted to head coach.
Southern Miss	M. K. Turk		James Green	Green was hired from the Iowa State coaching staff.
St. John's	Brian Mahoney		Fran Fraschilla	
Stephen F. Austin	Ned Fowler		Derek Allister	Fowler was relieved of his duties at the end of the season. Allister was promoted to head coach.
Toledo	Larry Gipson		Stan Joplin	Joplin was hired from the Michigan State coaching staff.
UAB	Gene Bartow		Murry Bartow	Gene retired from coaching, but remained with the school as athletic director. Murray was promoted from assistant coach, by his father, to be head coach of his alma mater.
UCLA	Jim Harrick		Steve Lavin	Harrick was fired at the end of the season due to NCAA violations with improper benefits towards student-athletes. Lavin was promoted from assistant.
UIC	Bob Hallberg		Jimmy Collins	Collins was an assistant on the Illinois coaching staff.
UMass	John Calipari		Bruiser Flint	Calipari left to become head coach of the New Jersey Nets. Flint was elevated from assistant.
UNC Asheville	Randy Wiel		Eddie Biedenbach	Weil left to coach Middle Tennessee. Biedenbach was hired from the NC State coaching staff.
UNC Charlotte	Jeff Mullins		Melvin Watkins	Mullins retired. Watkins was promoted from assistant to coach his alma mater.
USC	Charlie Parker	Henry Bibby		Parker left to join the Dallas Mavericks coaching staff. Bibby became interim going 1–9 for the remainder of the season, he was promoted to full time head coach.
Wichita State	Scott Thompson		Randy Smithson	
Wright State	Ralph Underhill		John Brown	
