= 1995–96 VCU Rams men's basketball team =

American college basketball season

1995–96 VCU Rams men's basketball

CAA tournament champions

NCAA tournament, First round vs. Mississippi State L 51–58
- Conference: Colonial Athletic Association
- Record: 24–9 (14–2 CAA)
- Head coach: Sonny Smith (7th season)
- Home arena: Richmond Coliseum

1995–96 CAA men's basketball standings
	Conf.				Overall
Team	W		L	PCT	W		L	PCT
VCU†	14	–	2	.875	24	–	9	.727
Old Dominion	12	–	4	.750	18	–	13	.581
UNC Wilmington	9	–	7	.563	13	–	16	.448
American	8	–	8	.500	12	–	15	.444
East Carolina	8	–	8	.500	17	–	11	.607
William & Mary	6	–	10	.375	10	–	16	.385
James Madison	6	–	10	.375	10	–	20	.333
George Mason	6	–	10	.375	11	–	16	.407
Richmond	3	–	13	.188	8	–	20	.286
† 1996 CAA tournament winner Rankings from AP poll

The 1995–96 VCU Rams men's basketball team represented Virginia Commonwealth University during the 1995–96 NCAA Division I men's basketball season. It was the 28th season of the university fielding a men's basketball program, and the program's first season in the Colonial Athletic Association, after previously playing in the Metro Conference. The Rams were coached by 7th year head coach, Sonny Smith.

The 1995–96 season was the first season in 11 years that the Rams earned a berth into the NCAA Division I men's basketball tournament. The Rams won an automatic berth by winning the 1996 CAA men's basketball tournament, beating UNC Wilmington in the final. VCU's Bernard Hopkins won the CAA Tournament MVP Award.

In the NCAA Tournament, VCU entered as a 12-seed, where they played in the Southeast Regional bracket. The Rams lost to eventual Final Four contestant, Mississippi State 58–51 in the first round. The Rams would not return to the NCAA Tournament again until 2004.

== Schedule ==
Date time, TV	Rank^{#}	Opponent^{#}	Result	Record	Site (attendance) city, state
Non-conference regular season
11/24/1995*		vs. Western Kentucky; San Juan Shootout	W 83–65	1–0	Torres Coliseum; San Juan, PR
11/25/1995*		vs. Louisville; San Juan Shootout	L 74–83	1–1	Torres Coliseum; San Juan, PR
11/26/1995*		vs. James Madison; San Juan Shootout	W 66–60	2–1	Torres Coliseum; San Juan, PR
11/30/1995*		Xavier	W 81–75	3–1	Richmond Coliseum; Richmond, VA
12/02/1995*		at Liberty	L 71–86	3–2	Vines Center; Lynchburg, VA
12/04/1995*		FIU	W 82–61	4–2	Richmond Coliseum; Richmond, VA
12/07/1995*		Charlotte	W 85–74	5–2	Richmond Coliseum; Richmond, VA
12/09/1995*		Pittsburgh	L 69–72	5–3	Richmond Coliseum; Richmond, VA
12/16/1995*		at Rhode Island	L 63–68	5–4	Keaney Gymnasium; Kingston, RI
12/21/1995*		at Virginia; Battle of I-64	L 65–80	5–5	University Hall; Charlottesville, VA
12/23/1995*; 1:00 pm		Illinois State	W 74–72	6–5	Richmond Coliseum (3,031); Richmond, VA
12/27/1995*		vs. Jackson State; UNO Christmas Classic	W 66–48	7–5	Lakefront Arena; New Orleans, LA
12/28/1995*		at New Orleans; UNO Christmas Classic	L 75–92	7–6	Lakefront Arena (1,413); New Orleans, LA
CAA regular season
01/04/1996		at William & Mary	W 70–47	8–6 (1–0)	Kaplan Arena; Williamsburg, VA
01/06/1996		at Old Dominion; Rivalry	W 85–70	9–6 (2–0)	ODU Fieldhouse; Norfolk, VA
01/10/1996		George Mason; Rivalry	W 86–74	10–6 (3–0)	Richmond Coliseum; Richmond, VA
01/13/1996		at East Carolina	L 72–73	10–7 (3–1)	Minges Coliseum; Greenville, NC
01/17/1996		James Madison	W 81–70	11–7 (4–1)	Richmond Coliseum; Richmond, VA
01/20/1996		Richmond; Capital City Classic	W 79–51	12–7 (5–1)	Richmond Coliseum; Richmond, VA
01/26/1996		American	W 65–57	13–7 (6–1)	Richmond Coliseum; Richmond, VA
01/29/1996		at UNC Wilmington	W 63–45	14–7 (7–1)	Trask Coliseum; Wilmington, NC
01/31/1996		at George Mason; Rivalry	W 94–81	15–7 (8–1)	Patriot Center; Fairfax, VA
02/03/1996		Old Dominion; Rivalry	W 85–76 ^{OT}	16–7 (9–1)	Richmond Coliseum; Richmond, VA
02/07/1996		William & Mary	W 83–68	17–7 (10–1)	Richmond Coliseum; Richmond, VA
02/10/1996		East Carolina	W 80–71	18–7 (11–1)	Richmond Coliseum; Richmond, VA
02/13/1996		at American	W 65–57	19–7 (12–1)	Bender Arena; Washington, DC
02/17/1996		at James Madison	L 75–76	19–8 (12–2)	JMU Convocation Center; Harrisonburg, VA
02/21/1996		UNC Wilmington	W 63–44	20–8 (13–2)	Richmond Coliseum; Richmond, VA
02/24/1996		at Richmond; Capital City Classic	W 69–67	21–8 (14–2)	Robins Center; Richmond, VA
CAA tournament
03/02/1996	(1)	vs. (9) Richmond; Quarterfinals	W 89–55	22–8	Richmond Coliseum; Richmond, VA
03/03/1996	(1)	vs. (5) East Carolina; Semifinals	W 75–60	23–8	Richmond Coliseum; Richmond, VA
03/04/1996	(1)	vs. (3) UNC Wilmington; Championship	W 46–43	24–8	Richmond Coliseum; Richmond, VA
NCAA tournament
03/14/1996*	(12 SE)	vs. (5 SE) No. 23 Mississippi State; First round	L 51–58	24–9	RCA Dome; Indianapolis, IN
*Non-conference game. ^{#}Rankings from AP Poll. (#) Tournament seedings in parentheses.
