= 1995–96 Mississippi State Bulldogs men's basketball team =

American college basketball season

1995–96 Mississippi State Bulldogs men's basketball

SEC Tournament champions SEC West champions

NCAA tournament, Final Four
- Conference: Southeastern Conference
- West

Ranking
- Coaches: No. 4
- AP: No. 19
- Record: 26–8 (10–6 SEC)
- Head coach: Richard Williams (10th season)
- Assistant coaches: Rick Stansbury (6th season); Greg Carter; Owen Miller
- Home arena: Humphrey Coliseum

1995–96 Southeastern Conference men's basketball standings
	Conf.				Overall
Team	W		L	PCT	W		L	PCT
East
No. 2 Kentucky	16	–	0	1.000	34	–	2	.944
Georgia	9	–	7	.563	21	–	10	.677
South Carolina	8	–	8	.500	19	–	12	.613
Vanderbilt	7	–	9	.438	18	–	14	.563
Florida	6	–	10	.375	12	–	16	.429
Tennessee	6	–	10	.375	14	–	15	.483
West
No. 19 Mississippi State †	10	–	6	.625	26	–	8	.765
Arkansas	9	–	7	.563	20	–	13	.606
Alabama	9	–	7	.563	19	–	13	.594
Ole Miss	6	–	10	.375	12	–	15	.444
Auburn	6	–	10	.375	19	–	13	.594
LSU	4	–	12	.250	12	–	17	.414
† 1996 SEC tournament winner Rankings from AP Poll

The 1995–96 Mississippi State Bulldogs men's basketball team represented Mississippi State University in the 1995–96 NCAA Division I men's basketball season. Led by head coach Richard Williams, the Bulldogs won the SEC tournament and reached the Final Four.

== Roster ==
1995–96 Mississippi State Bulldogs men's basketball team
Players
Coaches

Pos.	#	Name	Height	Weight	Year	Hometown
G	3	Marcus Bullard	6 ft 3 in (1.91 m)	200 lb (91 kg)	Sr	Long Beach, Mississippi
C	25	Erick Dampier	6 ft 11 in (2.11 m)	265 lb (120 kg)	Jr	New Hebron, Mississippi
G	21	McKie Edmonson	6 ft 0 in (1.83 m)	170 lb (77 kg)	So	Madison, Mississippi
F	15	Whit Hughes	6 ft 5 in (1.96 m)	210 lb (95 kg)	So	Jackson, Mississippi
G	22	Bart Hyche	5 ft 11 in (1.8 m)	165 lb (75 kg)	Fr	Winfield, Alabama
F	32	Dontae' Jones	6 ft 7 in (2.01 m)	220 lb (100 kg)	Jr	Nashville, Tennessee
G	23	David Rula	6 ft 3 in (1.91 m)	185 lb (84 kg)	Fr	Jackson, Mississippi
F	24	Early Smith	6 ft 8 in (2.03 m)	235 lb (107 kg)	Fr	Starkville, Mississippi
F/C	20	Russell Walters	6 ft 10 in (2.08 m)	235 lb (107 kg)	Sr	Myrick, Mississippi
F	44	Jay Walton	6 ft 7 in (2.01 m)	225 lb (102 kg)	Sr	Pascagoula, Mississippi
F/C	42	Tyrone Washington	6 ft 10 in (2.08 m)	230 lb (104 kg)	Fr	Indianola, Mississippi
C	33	Bubba Wilson	6 ft 10 in (2.08 m)	240 lb (109 kg)	Sr	Wiggins, Mississippi
G	00	Darryl Wilson	6 ft 1 in (1.85 m)	185 lb (84 kg)	Sr	Kennedy, Alabama

Head coach

- Richard Williams

Assistant coach(es)

- Rick Stansbury
- Greg Carter
- Owen Miller

Legend

- (C) Team captain
- (S) Suspended
- (I) Ineligible
- (W) Walk-on
- Injured
- Current redshirt

== Schedule and results ==
Date time, TV	Rank^{#}	Opponent^{#}	Result	Record	Site city, state
Regular season
Nov 25, 1995*	No. 9	Southeastern Louisiana	W 121–78	1–0	Humphrey Coliseum; Starkville, Mississippi
Nov 28, 1995*	No. 8	UNC Wilmington	W 77–54	2–0	Humphrey Coliseum; Starkville, Mississippi
Dec 2, 1995*	No. 8	Brigham Young	W 79–74	3–0	Humphrey Coliseum; Starkville, Mississippi
Dec 5, 1995*	No. 8	Troy State	W 123–73	4–0	Humphrey Coliseum; Starkville, Mississippi
Dec 9, 1995*	No. 8	Arkansas-Little Rock	L 68–70	4–1	Humphrey Coliseum; Starkville, Mississippi
Dec 16, 1995*	No. 15	at Southern Miss	W 72–69 ^{OT}	5–1	Reed Green Coliseum; Hattiesburg, Mississippi
Dec 19, 1995*	No. 16	at Louisiana-Monroe	W 66–60	6–1	Fant-Ewing Coliseum; Monroe, Louisiana
Dec 29, 1995*	No. 17	vs. Oregon State; Far West Classic	W 76–62	7–1	Rose Garden Arena; Portland, Oregon
Dec 30, 1995*	No. 17	vs. Nebraska; Far West Classic	W 69–66	8–1	Rose Garden Arena; Portland, Oregon
Jan 3, 1996	No. 17	at LSU	W 77–64	9–1 (1–0)	Maravich Assembly Center; Baton Rouge, Louisiana
Jan 6, 1996	No. 17	at Florida	W 69–66	10–1 (2–0)	Stephen C. O'Connell Center; Gainesville, Florida
Jan 9, 1996	No. 12	No. 2 Kentucky	L 56–74	10–2 (2–1)	Humphrey Coliseum; Starkville, Mississippi
Jan 13, 1996	No. 12	Alabama	L 55–56	10–3 (2–2)	Humphrey Coliseum; Starkville, Mississippi
Jan 17, 1996	No. 21	Ole Miss	W 53–47	11–3 (3–2)	Humphrey Coliseum; Starkville, Mississippi
Jan 20, 1996	No. 21	at Arkansas	L 68–80	11–4 (3–3)	Bud Walton Arena; Fayetteville, Arkansas
Jan 24, 1996		at South Carolina	L 69–77	11–5 (3–4)	Carolina Coliseum; Columbia, South Carolina
Jan 27, 1996		Tennessee	W 60–59	12–5 (4–4)	Humphrey Coliseum; Starkville, Mississippi
Jan 31, 1996		Georgia	W 76–73	13–5 (5–4)	Humphrey Coliseum; Starkville, Mississippi
Feb 4, 1996		at No. 22 Auburn	W 78–75 ^{OT}	14–5 (6–4)	Beard-Eaves-Memorial Coliseum; Auburn, Alabama
Feb 6, 1996		Arkansas	W 78–63	15–5 (7–4)	Humphrey Coliseum; Starkville, Mississippi
Feb 10, 1996*		at Oklahoma	W 76–71	16–5	Lloyd Noble Center; Norman, Oklahoma
Feb 17, 1996	No. 25	at Ole Miss	L 64–71	16–6 (7–5)	Tad Smith Coliseum; Oxford, Mississippi
Feb 21, 1996		LSU	W 88–77	17–6 (8–5)	Humphrey Coliseum; Starkville, Mississippi
Feb 24, 1996		at Alabama	W 73–65	18–6 (9–5)	Coleman Coliseum; Tuscaloosa, Alabama
Feb 28, 1996		at Vanderbilt	L 64–69	18–7 (9–6)	Memorial Gymnasium; Nashville, Tennessee
Mar 2, 1996		Auburn	W 67–51	19–7 (10–6)	Humphrey Coliseum; Starkville, Mississippi
SEC Tournament
Mar 8, 1996*	No. 25	vs. Auburn; SEC Tournament Quarterfinal	W 69–58	20–7	Louisiana Superdome; New Orleans, Louisiana
Mar 9, 1996*	No. 25	vs. Georgia; SEC Tournament Semifinal	W 86–68	21–7	Louisiana Superdome; New Orleans, Louisiana
Mar 10, 1996*	No. 25	vs. No. 1 Kentucky; SEC tournament championship	W 84–73	22–7	Louisiana Superdome; New Orleans, Louisiana
NCAA Tournament
Mar 14, 1996*	(5 SE) No. 19	vs. (12 SE) VCU; First round	W 58–51	23–7	RCA Dome; Indianapolis, Indiana
Mar 16, 1996*	(5 SE) No. 19	vs. (13 SE) Princeton; Second Round	W 63–41	24–7	RCA Dome; Indianapolis, Indiana
Mar 22, 1996*; CBS	(5 SE) No. 19	vs. (1 SE) No. 3 Connecticut; Southeast Regional semifinal – Sweet Sixteen	W 60–55	25–7	Rupp Arena (28,890); Lexington, Kentucky
Mar 24, 1996*	(5 SE) No. 19	vs. (2 SE) No. 7 Cincinnati; Southeast Regional Final – Elite Eight	W 73–63	26–7	Rupp Arena; Lexington, Kentucky
Mar 30, 1996*	(5 SE) No. 19	vs. (4 W) No. 15 Syracuse; National Semifinal	L 69–77	26–8	Continental Airlines Arena; East Rutherford, New Jersey
*Non-conference game. ^{#}Rankings from AP Poll. (#) Tournament seedings in parentheses.

== Team players in the 1996 NBA draft ==
Round	Pick	Player	NBA club
1	10	Erick Dampier	Indiana Pacers
1	21	Dontae' Jones	New York Knicks
