= Sunday Adebayo =

Nigerian basketball player (born 1973)

Personal information
- Born: 12 September 1973 (age 53) Benin City, Nigeria
- Listed height: 6 ft 6 in (1.98 m)
- Listed weight: 225 lb (102 kg)

Career information
- College: Three Rivers (1993–1995); Arkansas (1995–1996); Memphis (1996–1997); Arkansas (1997–1998)
- NBA draft: 1998: undrafted
- Position: Power forward

Career history
- 2000: TSK uniVersa Bamberg
- 2002–2003: Perth Wildcats

Sunday A. Adebayo (born 12 September 1973) is a Nigerian former professional basketball player. He played college basketball for the Arkansas Razorbacks and Memphis Tigers.

== Early life, family and education ==
Adebayo was born in Benin City, Nigeria. While a high school student, he played for the Nigerian soccer team for the Junior World Cup. He was a goalkeeper and aspired to play professional soccer in Europe until his conversion to playing basketball as he grew taller. He played for the Nigerian basketball team at the 1991 FIBA Under-19 World Championship.

Adebayo relocated to Newark, New Jersey, US, where he worked for a year at an uncle's computer company. Adebayo played basketball in a league at his church and on playgrounds in Newark.

== College career ==
In 1993, Adebayo travelled to Arkansas, hoping to secure an athletic scholarship to play for University of Central Arkansas's Bears basketball team, but its roster was set, and it did not want to acquire someone who they considered a long-term project. Central Arkansas head coach Don Dyer later lamented the loss and compared Adebayo to former Bears player and NBA great Scottie Pippen. Adebayo instead began his college basketball career playing for the Raiders of Three Rivers College, a community college in Poplar Bluff, Missouri, where he became a first-team All-American. He averaged 19 points and 10 rebounds during his junior college career. Adebayo still holds the Raiders record for career rebounds with 706.

Adebayo earned attention from major National Collegiate Athletic Association (NCAA) Division I teams throughout his junior college career, and Adebayo committed to play for the Arkansas Razorbacks on 18 April 1995. He averaged 10.7 points and a team-high 7.6 rebounds during the 1995–96 season. On 1 March 1996, Adebayo was deemed ineligible by the Razorbacks to complete the final 11 games of the season due to issues with his junior college transcript. The NCAA had commenced questioning about Adebayo's eligibility and the Razorbacks voluntarily declared Adebayo ineligible. His junior college grades had not been properly certified due to an administrative error by the University of Arkansas, and he had started to practice with the Razorbacks eight days earlier than permitted. Adebayo was allowed to stay at the University of Arkansas but could not play on the basketball team or receive financial aid. The NCAA declared that Adebayo would have immediate eligibility if he transferred to a school outside of the Razorbacks' Southeastern Conference (SEC) and cited "extenuating circumstances." Adebayo entered his name into the 1996 NBA draft but stated that he would consider transferring to play for the Oral Roberts University Golden Eagles, Oklahoma State University Cowboys or University of Memphis Tigers if he did not like his draft prospects. He withdrew from the draft before it took place and transferred to play for Memphis.

Adebayo's start with the University of Memphis Tigers during the 1996–97 season was delayed while he completed exams. When the Tigers played an away game against the Razorbacks on February 2, 1997, Adebayo received two standing ovations from Razorbacks fans at the suggestion of Razorbacks coach Nolan Richardson. Adebayo stayed in contact with his former team throughout the season in a display of loyalty that Richardson considered "unique." Adebayo's devotion to the Razorbacks bothered Tigers fans, who considered him a "traitor" and booed him throughout his first game upon his return from Arkansas. He averaged 13.3 points and a team-high 7 rebounds per game during his only season with the Tigers. An injury in February 1997, a partially torn knee ligament, seeded doubt on his playing prospects for the remainder of that season.

In April 1997, the NCAA admitted that Adebayo had been wrongly suspended. Adebayo hired a lawyer and appealed to earn a rare fifth season of college eligibility that was granted by an NCAA administrative review panel in October 1997. He returned to the Arkansas Razorbacks for the 1997–98 season but was required to relinquish his scholarship to comply with NCAA sanctions placed on the team for other violations. Adebayo stated, "I knew I didn't do anything wrong. People say I've made history, but I don't get carried away with that. I'm just glad I got the year here back." His entry back into the Razorbacks lineup was hindered due to a sprained ankle. Adebayo averaged 6.2 points and 3.0 rebounds per game during the 1997–98 season.

== Professional athletic career ==
Adebayo was selected by the Grand Rapids Hoops with the 55th overall pick in the 1998 Continental Basketball Association (CBA) draft.

Adebayo played four games in the German Basketball Bundesliga (BBL) during the 2000–01 season. He averaged 15.7 points and 8.0 rebounds per game.

Adebayo played for the Perth Wildcats of the Australian National Basketball League (NBL) during the 2002–03 NBL season. He averaged 5.0 points and 4.4 rebounds per game.

== Career statistics ==
Legend
GP	Games played	GS	Games started	MPG	Minutes per game
FG%	Field goal percentage	3P%	3-point field goal percentage	FT%	Free throw percentage
RPG	Rebounds per game	APG	Assists per game	SPG	Steals per game
BPG	Blocks per game	PPG	Points per game	**Bold**	Career high

=== College ===
Year	Team	GP	GS	MPG	FG%	3P%	FT%	RPG	APG	SPG	BPG	PPG
1995–96	Arkansas	22	14	26.1	.572	–	.609	**7.6**	1.4	**1.4**	**.4**	10.5
1996–97	Memphis	**26**	**23**	**31.6**	**.579**	.000	.619	7.0	**1.5**	.8	**.4**	**13.3**
1997–98	Arkansas	22	6	15.2	.511	–	**.677**	3.6	1.3	.8	.2	6.2
Career		70	43	24.7	.564	.000	.630	6.1	1.4	1.0	.3	10.2
