= 1996 CAA men's basketball tournament =

- Classification: Division I
- Season: 1995–96
- Teams: 9
- Site: Richmond Coliseum; Richmond, Virginia
- Champions: VCU (1st title)
- Winning coach: Sonny Smith (1st title)
- MVP: Bernard Hopkins (VCU)
- Television: ESPN

1995–96 CAA men's basketball standings
	Conf.				Overall
Team	W		L	PCT	W		L	PCT
VCU†	14	–	2	.875	24	–	9	.727
Old Dominion	12	–	4	.750	18	–	13	.581
UNC Wilmington	9	–	7	.563	13	–	16	.448
American	8	–	8	.500	12	–	15	.444
East Carolina	8	–	8	.500	17	–	11	.607
William & Mary	6	–	10	.375	10	–	16	.385
James Madison	6	–	10	.375	10	–	20	.333
George Mason	6	–	10	.375	11	–	16	.407
Richmond	3	–	13	.188	8	–	20	.286
† 1996 CAA tournament winner Rankings from AP poll

The 1996 CAA men's basketball tournament was held March 1–4, 1996, at the Richmond Coliseum in Richmond, Virginia. The winner of the tournament was VCU, who received an automatic bid to the 1996 NCAA Men's Division I Basketball Tournament.

== Bracket ==
First round Friday, March 1
8	George Mason	77
9	Richmond	93

Quarterfinals; Saturday, March 2
1	VCU	89
9	Richmond	55
4	American	60
5	East Carolina	76
2	Old Dominion	75
7	James Madison	72
3	UNC Wilmington	63
6	William & Mary	55

Semifinals; Sunday, March 3
1	VCU	75
5	East Carolina	60
2	Old Dominion	39
3	UNC Wilmington	59

Final; Monday, March 4
1	VCU	46
3	UNC Wilmington	43

== Honors ==
CAA All-Tournament Team	Player	School
CAA All-Tournament Team	Bernard Hopkins	VCU
CAA All-Tournament Team	Darren Moore	UNC-Wilmington
CAA All-Tournament Team	Darren McLinton	James Madison
CAA All-Tournament Team	Stan Simmons	UNC-Wilmington
CAA All-Tournament Team	Ben Peabody	VCU
CAA All-Tournament Team	Joe Bunn	Old Dominion
