= 1995–96 New Orleans Privateers men's basketball team =

American college basketball season

1995–96 New Orleans Privateers men's basketball

Sun Belt regular season champions Sun Belt tournament champions

NCAA tournament, First Round
- Conference: Sun Belt Conference
- Record: 21–9 (14–4 Sun Belt)
- Head coach: Tic Price (2nd season)
- Home arena: Lakefront Arena

1995–96 Sun Belt Conference men's basketball standings
| | Conf. | | | | Overall |
| Team | W | | L | PCT | W | | L | PCT |
|---|---|---|---|---|---|---|---|---|
| New Orleans † | 14 | – | 4 | .778 | 21 | – | 9 | .700 |
| Arkansas–Little Rock | 14 | – | 4 | .778 | 23 | – | 7 | .767 |
| Jacksonville | 10 | – | 8 | .556 | 15 | – | 13 | .536 |
| Western Kentucky | 10 | – | 8 | .556 | 13 | – | 14 | .481 |
| Southwestern Louisiana | 9 | – | 9 | .500 | 16 | – | 12 | .571 |
| Lamar | 7 | – | 11 | .389 | 12 | – | 15 | .444 |
| South Alabama | 7 | – | 11 | .389 | 12 | – | 15 | .444 |
| Arkansas State | 7 | – | 11 | .389 | 9 | – | 18 | .333 |
| Louisiana Tech | 6 | – | 12 | .333 | 11 | – | 17 | .393 |
| Texas–Pan American | 6 | – | 12 | .333 | 9 | – | 19 | .321 |
† 1996 Sun Belt Conference tournament winner Rankings from AP Poll

The 1995–96 New Orleans Privateers men's basketball team represented the University of New Orleans during the 1995–96 NCAA Division I men's basketball season. The Privateers led by second-year head coach, Tic Price, played their home games at Lakefront Arena and played as a member of the Sun Belt Conference. They finished the season 21–9 (14–4 Sun Belt), sweeping through the Sun Belt regular season. New Orleans lost in the championship game of the Sun Belt Conference tournament, but received a bid to the NCAA tournament as the No. 11 seed in the East region. The Privateers would lose in the opening round to No. 6 seed North Carolina, 83–62.

== Roster ==
1995–96 New Orleans Privateers men's basketball team
| Players | Coaches |
|---|---|
| Pos. / # / Name / Height / Weight / Year / Previous school / Hometown; G / / Tyrone Garris / 6 ft 0 in (1.83 m) / — / Sr | Head coach: Tic Price (Louisiana Tech); Assistant coach(es) Legend: (C) Team captain; (S) Suspended; (I) Ineligible; (W) Walk-on; Injured; Current redshirt |

== Schedule and results ==
| Date time, TV | Rank^{#} | Opponent^{#} | Result | Record | Site (attendance) city, state |
Regular season
| Dec 2, 1995* | | at Bradley | L 72–87 | 0–1 | Carver Arena (9,711); Peoria, Illinois |
| Dec 7, 1995* | | at Southern Miss | W 68–66 | 1–1 | (3,823) |
| Dec 16, 1995* | | at Middle Tennessee | W 69–67 | 2–1 | (1,800) |
| Dec 18, 1995* | | Oregon State | L 61–68 | 2–2 | Lakefront Arena (1,444); New Orleans, LA |
| Dec 22, 1995* | | No. 7 Villanova | L 72–80 | 2–3 | Lakefront Arena (5,367); New Orleans, LA |
| Dec 27, 1995* | | San Francisco; UNO Christmas Classic | W 94–84 ^{OT} | 3–3 | Lakefront Arena (1,407); New Orleans, LA |
| Dec 28, 1995* | | VCU; UNO Christmas Classic | W 92–75 | 4–3 | Lakefront Arena (1,413); New Orleans, LA |
Sun Belt Conference tournament
| Mar 2, 1996* | | vs. Louisiana Tech; Quarterfinals | W 67–57 | 19–8 | Barton Coliseum; Little Rock, Arkansas |
| Mar 3, 1996* | | vs. Southwestern Louisiana; Semifinals | W 75–71 ^{2OT} | 20–8 | Barton Coliseum; Little Rock, Arkansas |
| Mar 5, 1996* | | at Little Rock; Championship game | W 57–56 | 21–8 | Barton Coliseum; Little Rock, Arkansas |
NCAA tournament
| Mar 15, 1996* | (11 E) | vs. (6 E) No. 25 North Carolina; First round | L 62–83 | 21–9 | Richmond Coliseum; Richmond, Virginia |
*Non-conference game. ^{#}Rankings from AP poll. (#) Tournament seedings in parentheses. All times are in Central Time.
