= 1995–96 Alabama Crimson Tide men's basketball team =

American college basketball season

1995–96 Alabama Crimson Tide men's basketball

NIT, Semifinal
- Conference: Southeastern Conference
- Record: 19–13 (9–7 SEC)
- Head coach: David Hobbs (4th season)
- Assistant coaches: Mike Davis (1st season); Bob Marlin (1st season)
- Home arena: Coleman Coliseum

1995–96 Southeastern Conference men's basketball standings
	Conf.				Overall
Team	W		L	PCT	W		L	PCT
East
No. 2 Kentucky	16	–	0	1.000	34	–	2	.944
Georgia	9	–	7	.563	21	–	10	.677
South Carolina	8	–	8	.500	19	–	12	.613
Vanderbilt	7	–	9	.438	18	–	14	.563
Florida	6	–	10	.375	12	–	16	.429
Tennessee	6	–	10	.375	14	–	15	.483
West
No. 19 Mississippi State †	10	–	6	.625	26	–	8	.765
Arkansas	9	–	7	.563	20	–	13	.606
Alabama	9	–	7	.563	19	–	13	.594
Ole Miss	6	–	10	.375	12	–	15	.444
Auburn	6	–	10	.375	19	–	13	.594
LSU	4	–	12	.250	12	–	17	.414
† 1996 SEC tournament winner Rankings from AP Poll

The 1995–96 Alabama Crimson Tide men's basketball team represented the University of Alabama in the 1995-96 NCAA Division I men's basketball season. The team's head coach was David Hobbs, who was in his fourth season at Alabama. The team played their home games at Coleman Coliseum in Tuscaloosa, Alabama. They finished the season with a record of 19–13, with a conference record of 9–7, which placed them in a tie for second in the SEC Western Division.

The Tide lost in the first round of the 1996 SEC men's basketball tournament, where they lost to Tennessee. The Tide did not receive an at-large bid to the 1996 NCAA tournament. Instead, they received an invitation to 1996 NIT, where they defeated Illinois, Missouri, and South Carolina to earn a semifinal berth, where they were defeated by Saint Joseph's, and then Tulane in the third-place game.

== Roster ==
1995–96 Alabama Crimson Tide men's basketball team
Players
Coaches

Pos.	#	Name	Height	Weight	Year	Previous school	Hometown
G	14	Eric Washington	6 ft 4 in (1.93 m)	—	Jr	Pearl High School	Pearl, Mississippi
C	50	Roy Rogers	6 ft 10 in (2.08 m)	—	Jr	Linden High School	Linden, Alabama
G	4	Brian Williams	6 ft 1 in (1.85 m)	—	Fr	Davis High School	Montgomery, Alabama
G	15	Marvin Orange	6 ft 0 in (1.83 m)	—	Jr	Irmo High School	Irmo, South Carolina
G		Anthony Brown	6 ft 5 in (1.96 m)	—	So
F		Anton Reese	6 ft 3 in (1.91 m)	—	Fr	Lithonia High School	Lithonia, Georgia
C	54	Thalamus McGhee	6 ft 9 in (2.06 m)	—	Jr	Westfield High School	Houston, Texas
F		MC Mazique	6 ft 10 in (2.08 m)	—	Fr	Brooklyn, New York
G	30	Damon Bacote	6 ft 3 in (1.91 m)	—	Sr	Hampton High School	Hampton, Virginia
G	34	Blake Thrasher	6 ft 6 in (1.98 m)	—	Fr
C		Scott Hamilton	6 ft 8 in (2.03 m)	—	So

Head coach

- David Hobbs

Assistant coach(es)

- Mike Davis
- Bob Marlin

Legend

- (C) Team captain
- (S) Suspended
- (I) Ineligible
- (W) Walk-on
- Injured
- Current redshirt

== Schedule and results ==
Date time, TV	Rank^{#}	Opponent^{#}	Result	Record	Site city, state
Regular Season
Nov, 25, 1995*		Winthrop	W 84–69	1–0	Coleman Coliseum; Tuscaloosa, AL
Dec 2, 1995*		at North Texas	W 74–72	2–0	UNT Coliseum; Denton, TX
Dec 6, 1995*		Tennessee Tech	W 90–78	3–0	Coleman Coliseum; Tuscaloosa, AL
Dec 16, 1995*		Mercer	W 100–73	4–0	Coleman Coliseum; Tuscaloosa, AL
Dec 19, 1995*		Florida A&M	W 80–39	5–0	Coleman Coliseum; Tuscaloosa, AL
Dec 21, 1995*		Tulane	W 80–79	6–0	Coleman Coliseum; Tuscaloosa, AL
Dec 28, 1995*		vs. Saint Peter's; Cessna Classic	L 49–59	6–1	Levitt Arena; Wichita, KS
Dec 29, 1995*		vs. Bucknell; Cessna Classic	L 64–72	6–2	Levitt Arena; Wichita, KS
Jan 3, 1996		Vanderbilt	W 80–71	7–2 (1–0)	Coleman Coliseum; Tuscaloosa, AL
Jan 6, 1996		at LSU	L 77–99	7–3 (1–1)	Maravich Assembly Center; Baton Rouge, LA
Jan 10, 1996		Auburn	W 72–65	8–3 (2–1)	Coleman Coliseum; Tuscaloosa, AL
Jan 13, 1996		at No. 12 Mississippi State	W 56–55	9–3 (3–1)	Humphrey Coliseum; Starkville, MS
Jan 17, 1996		Tennessee	W 62–53	10–3 (4–1)	Coleman Coliseum; Tuscaloosa, AL
Jan 20, 1996		at South Carolina	L 67–90	10–4 (4–2)	Carolina Coliseum; Columbia, SC
Jan 23, 1996		Arkansas	L 63–71	10–5 (4–3)	Coleman Coliseum; Tuscaloosa, AL
Jan 27, 1996		at Ole Miss	L 63–70	10–6 (4–4)	Tad Smith Coliseum; Oxford, MS
Jan 31, 1996		Florida	W 68–65	11–6 (5–4)	Coleman Coliseum; Tuscaloosa, AL
Feb 4, 1996*		at No. 18 Syracuse	L 68–81	11–7	Carrier Dome; Syracuse, NY
Feb 6, 1996*		at Southern Miss	W 83–69	12–7	Reed Green Coliseum; Hattiesburg, MS
Feb 10, 1996		at Georgia	L 55–68	12–8 (5–5)	Stegeman Coliseum; Athens, GA
Feb 14, 1996		at Auburn	W 75–72	13–8 (6–5)	Beard–Eaves Memorial Coliseum; Auburn, AL
Feb 17, 1996		LSU	W 76–73	14–8 (7–5)	Coleman Coliseum; Tuscaloosa, AL
Feb 20, 1996		at No. 2 Kentucky	L 65–84	14–9 (7–6)	Rupp Arena; Lexington, KY
Feb 24, 1996		Mississippi State	L 65–73	14–10 (7–7)	Coleman Coliseum; Tuscaloosa, AL
Feb 28, 1996		at Arkansas	W 98–89	15–10 (8–7)	Bud Walton Arena; Fayetteville, AR
Mar 2, 1996		Ole Miss	W 67–63	16–10 (9–7)	Coleman Coliseum; Tuscaloosa, AL
SEC Tournament
Mar 7, 1996		vs. Tennessee; SEC tournament first round	L 65–77	16–11	Louisiana Superdome; New Orleans, LA
NIT
Mar 13, 1996*		at Illinois; NIT first round	W 72–69	17–11	Assembly Hall; Champaign, IL
Mar 18, 1996*		Missouri; NIT second round	W 72–49	18–11	Coleman Coliseum; Tuscaloosa, AL
Mar 20, 1996*		at South Carolina; NIT Quarterfinals	W 68–67	19–11	Carolina Coliseum; Columbia, SC
Mar 26, 1996*		vs. Saint Joseph's; NIT Semifinals	L 69–74 ^{OT}	19–12	Madison Square Garden; New York, NY
Mar 28, 1996*		vs. Tulane; NIT third-place game	L 76–87	19–13	Madison Square Garden; New York, NY
*Non-conference game. ^{#}Rankings from AP Poll. (#) Tournament seedings in parentheses.
