= 1995–96 Princeton Tigers men's basketball team =

American college basketball season

1995–96 Princeton Tigers men's basketball

Ivy League Champion

One-game Ivy League playoff, Won 1996 NCAA Men's Division I Tournament, Thirteen Seed, Regional quarterfinal
- Conference: Ivy League
- Record: 22–7 (12–2, 1st-t Ivy)
- Head coach: Pete Carril (29th season)
- Captain: Sydney Johnson
- Home arena: Jadwin Gymnasium

1995–96 Ivy League men's basketball standings
	Conf.				Overall
Team	W		L	PCT	W		L	PCT
Princeton	12	–	2	.857	22	–	7	.759
Penn	12	–	2	.857	17	–	10	.630
Dartmouth	9	–	5	.643	16	–	10	.615
Harvard	7	–	7	.500	15	–	11	.577
Brown	5	–	9	.357	10	–	16	.385
Cornell	5	–	9	.357	10	–	16	.385
Yale	3	–	11	.214	8	–	18	.308
Columbia	3	–	11	.214	7	–	19	.269
Rankings from AP Poll

The 1995–96 Princeton Tigers men's basketball team represented Princeton University in intercollegiate college basketball during the 1995–96 NCAA Division I men's basketball season. The head coach was Pete Carril and the team captain was Sydney Johnson. The team played its home games in the Jadwin Gymnasium on the University campus in Princeton, New Jersey. The team was the champion of the Ivy League, which earned them an invitation to the 64-team 1996 NCAA Division I men's basketball tournament where they were seeded thirteenth in the Southeast Region. This was the final year that Carril coached the men's basketball team. He would be succeeded by assistant coach Bill Carmody. Carrill retired as the Ivy League's winningest coach in terms of overall victories, conference victories and conference championships. By the end of the decade, Princeton achieved a 76.1% (210–66) winning percentage, which was the eighth best in the nation.

Using the Princeton offense, the team posted a 22–7 overall record and a 13–2 conference record. Even after Jerome Allen and Matt Maloney who led the Penn Quakers to Ivy titles in the prior four seasons graduated, Princeton's only two losses were to Penn. After losing the regular season finale at The Palestra against Penn to finish the regular season tied for the conference championship on March 5, the team won its March 9, 1996, one-game Ivy League playoff game against Penn in Bethlehem, Pennsylvania, at the Stabler Arena by a 63–56 margin in overtime for the Ivy League Championship and an invitation to the NCAA Division I men's basketball tournament. The win ended an eight-game losing streak to Penn. The win earned the team the conference automatic bid to the 1996 NCAA tournament and following the game head coach Pete Carril announced his retirement. On March 14, the 13th seeded team was matched against the defending national champion and fourth seeded UCLA Bruins in the NCAA Division I men's basketball tournament Southeast Regional first round game at the RCA Dome in Indianapolis, Indiana. The team fell behind 41–34 with over six minutes remaining, but held UCLA scoreless the rest of the game, winning 43–41 on the strength of a typical Princeton offense, Steve Goodrich to Gabe Lewullis bounce pass backdoor basket. During the game, Sydney Johnson's leadership held the team together early when the UCLA team looked strong. It was the final upset the team produced in Carril's career, as two days later, the Tigers season ended with a 63–41 loss to Mississippi State in the second round.

The team was led by first team All-Ivy League selections Steve Goodrich and Johnson. The team won the eighth of twelve consecutive national statistical championships in scoring defense with a 51.7 points allowed average. Goodrich led the Ivy League with a 60.3 field goal percentage.

== Schedule and results ==
Date time, TV	Rank^{#}	Opponent^{#}	Result	Record	Site city, state
Non-conference Regular season
Nov 27, 1995*		at Lehigh	W 62–45	1–0	Stabler Arena; Bethlehem, Pennsylvania
Nov 29, 1995*		Lafayette	W 62–47	2–0	Jadwin Gymnasium; Princeton, New Jersey
Dec 1, 1995*		vs. Boise State	W 61–41	3–0	Selland Arena; Fresno, California
Dec 2, 1995*		at Fresno State	W 59–54	4–0	Selland Arena; Fresno, California
Dec 12, 1995*		Monmouth	L 56–65	4–1	Jadwin Gymnasium; Princeton, New Jersey
Dec 18, 1995*		Saint Joseph's	W 88–78	5–1	Jadwin Gymnasium; Princeton, New Jersey
Dec 21, 1995*		at Iowa State; ISU Holiday Classic	L 47–50	5–2	Hilton Coliseum; Ames, Iowa
Dec 22, 1995*		vs. Nicholls State; ISU Holiday Classic	W 86–51	6–2	Hilton Coliseum; Ames, Iowa
Dec 29, 1995*		vs. Ohio; Pepsi/Oneida Casino Classic	W 65–60	7–2	Brown County Arena; Ashwaubenon, Wisconsin
Dec 30, 1995*		at Green Bay; Pepsi/Oneida Casino Classic	L 35–55	7–3	Brown County Arena; Ashwaubenon, Wisconsin
Jan 3, 1996*		at La Salle	L 49–52	7–4	Convention Hall; Philadelphia, Pennsylvania
Ivy League Regular season
Jan 6, 1996		Penn	L 55–57	7–5 (0–1)	Jadwin Gymnasium; Princeton, New Jersey
Jan 12, 1996		Yale	W 56–55	8–5 (1–1)	Jadwin Gymnasium; Princeton, New Jersey
Jan 13, 1996		Brown	W 64–36	9–5 (2–1)	Jadwin Gymnasium; Princeton, New Jersey
Jan 29, 1996*		Haverford	W 75–46	10–5	Jadwin Gymnasium; Princeton, New Jersey
Feb 2, 1996		Columbia	W 66–45	11–5 (3–1)	Jadwin Gymnasium; Princeton, New Jersey
Feb 3, 1996		Cornell	W 57–54	12–5 (4–1)	Jadwin Gymnasium; Princeton, New Jersey
Feb 9, 1996		at Harvard	W 49–44	13–5 (5–1)	Lavietes Pavilion; Cambridge, Massachusetts
Feb 10, 1996		at Dartmouth	W 52–41	14–5 (6–1)	Leede Arena; Hanover, New Hampshire
Feb 16, 1996		at Brown	W 58–56	15–5 (7–1)	Pizzitola Sports Center; Providence, Rhode Island
Feb 17, 1996		at Yale	W 64–42	16–5 (8–1)	John J. Lee Amphitheater; New Haven, Connecticut
Feb 23, 1996		Dartmouth	W 65–39	17–5 (9–1)	Jadwin Gymnasium; Princeton, New Jersey
Feb 24, 1996		Harvard	W 65–58	18–5 (10–1)	Jadwin Gymnasium; Princeton, New Jersey
Mar 1, 1996		at Cornell	W 65–49	19–5 (11–1)	Newman Arena; Ithaca, New York
Mar 2, 1996		at Columbia	W 57–55	20–5 (12–1)	Levien Gymnasium; New York, New York
Mar 5, 1996		at Penn	L 49–63	20–6 (12–2)	The Palestra; Philadelphia, Pennsylvania
Ivy League Playoff
Mar 9, 1996*		vs. Penn	W 63–56 ^{OT}	21–6	Stabler Arena; Bethlehem, Pennsylvania
NCAA tournament
Mar 14, 1996*	(13 MW)	vs. (4 MW) No. 14 UCLA; First round	W 43–41	22–6	RCA Dome (31,569); Indianapolis, Indiana
Mar 16, 1996*	(13 MW)	vs. (5 MW) No. 19 Mississippi State; Second round	L 41–63	22–7	RCA Dome; Indianapolis, Indiana
*Non-conference game. ^{#}Rankings from AP Poll. (#) Tournament seedings in parentheses.
