= 1995–96 Tennessee Volunteers basketball team =

American college basketball season

1995–1996 Tennessee Volunteers basketball

Orange Bowl Classic Champion

NIT, 1st round
- Conference: Southeastern Conference
- East
- Record: 14-15 (6-10 SEC)
- Head coach: Kevin O'Neill
- Home arena: Thompson–Boling Arena

1995–96 Southeastern Conference men's basketball standings
	Conf.				Overall
Team	W		L	PCT	W		L	PCT
East
No. 2 Kentucky	16	–	0	1.000	34	–	2	.944
Georgia	9	–	7	.563	21	–	10	.677
South Carolina	8	–	8	.500	19	–	12	.613
Vanderbilt	7	–	9	.438	18	–	14	.563
Florida	6	–	10	.375	12	–	16	.429
Tennessee	6	–	10	.375	14	–	15	.483
West
No. 19 Mississippi State †	10	–	6	.625	26	–	8	.765
Arkansas	9	–	7	.563	20	–	13	.606
Alabama	9	–	7	.563	19	–	13	.594
Ole Miss	6	–	10	.375	12	–	15	.444
Auburn	6	–	10	.375	19	–	13	.594
LSU	4	–	12	.250	12	–	17	.414
† 1996 SEC tournament winner Rankings from AP Poll

The 1995–96 Tennessee Volunteers basketball team represented the University of Tennessee during the 1995–96 NCAA Division I men's basketball season. The team was led by head coach Kevin O'Neill, and played their home games at Thompson–Boling Arena in Knoxville, Tennessee, as a member of the Southeastern Conference.

On December 27, 1995, Tennessee defeated Miami 56-54 in the Orange Bowl Basketball Classic at Miami Arena.

The Volunteers finished the season with a 14-15 record. Tennessee was eliminated from the SEC tournament in a 2nd round loss to Georgia 74-63. In the 1996 NIT, they lost in the 1st round to Charleston 55-49 on March 13, 1996.
