= 1995–96 Georgia Bulldogs basketball team =

American college basketball season

1995–96 Georgia Bulldogs basketball

NCAA tournament, Sweet Sixteen
- Conference: Southeastern Conference
- East

Ranking
- Coaches: No. 16
- Record: 21–10 (9–7 SEC)
- Head coach: Tubby Smith (1st season)
- Assistant coach: Ron Jirsa (1st season)
- Home arena: Stegeman Coliseum

1995–96 Southeastern Conference men's basketball standings
	Conf.				Overall
Team	W		L	PCT	W		L	PCT
East
No. 2 Kentucky	16	–	0	1.000	34	–	2	.944
Georgia	9	–	7	.563	21	–	10	.677
South Carolina	8	–	8	.500	19	–	12	.613
Vanderbilt	7	–	9	.438	18	–	14	.563
Florida	6	–	10	.375	12	–	16	.429
Tennessee	6	–	10	.375	14	–	15	.483
West
No. 19 Mississippi State †	10	–	6	.625	26	–	8	.765
Arkansas	9	–	7	.563	20	–	13	.606
Alabama	9	–	7	.563	19	–	13	.594
Ole Miss	6	–	10	.375	12	–	15	.444
Auburn	6	–	10	.375	19	–	13	.594
LSU	4	–	12	.250	12	–	17	.414
† 1996 SEC tournament winner Rankings from AP Poll

The 1995–96 Georgia Bulldogs basketball team represented the University of Georgia as a member of the Southeastern Conference during the 1995–96 NCAA men's basketball season. The team was led by head coach Tubby Smith, and played their home games at Stegeman Coliseum in Athens, Georgia. The Bulldogs finished 6th during the SEC Regular season, and received an at-large bid to the NCAA tournament as No. 8 seed in the West region. They defeated No. 9 seed Clemson and No. 1 seed Purdue to reach the Sweet Sixteen. The Bulldogs fell to Syracuse, the eventual National runner-up, to finish the season at 21–10 (9–7 SEC).

== Roster ==
1995–96 Georgia Bulldogs men's basketball team
Players
Coaches

Pos.	#	Name	Height	Weight	Year	Hometown
F	24	Michael Chadwick	6 ft 4 in (1.93 m)	—	Fr
G/F	40	Shandon Anderson	6 ft 6 in (1.98 m)	205 lb (93 kg)	Sr	Atlanta, Georgia

Head coach

- Tubby Smith

Assistant coach(es)

Legend

- (C) Team captain
- (S) Suspended
- (I) Ineligible
- (W) Walk-on
- Injured
- Current redshirt

== Schedule and results ==
Date time, TV	Rank^{#}	Opponent^{#}	Result	Record	Site city, state
Non-conference Regular season
Nov 27, 1995*		vs. Georgia Southern	W 88–44	1–0	Augusta-Richmond Civic Center; Augusta, Georgia
Nov 29, 1995*		Western Carolina	W 91–71	2–0	Stegeman Coliseum; Athens, Georgia
Dec 2, 1995*		at Pittsburgh	W 85–66	3–0	Fitzgerald Field House; Pittsburgh, Pennsylvania
Dec 7, 1995*		at No. 13 North Carolina	L 74–85	3–1	Dean Smith Center; Chapel Hill, North Carolina
Dec 10, 1995*		at Winthrop	W 81–55	4–1	Winthrop Coliseum; Rock Hill, South Carolina
Dec 13, 1995*		No. 19 Georgia Tech	W 94–70	5–1	Stegeman Coliseum; Athens, Georgia
Dec 16, 1995*		vs. No. 17 Virginia Tech; Jeep-Eagle Classic	W 85–72	6–1	Atlanta, Georgia
Dec 19, 1995*	No. 18	Central Florida	W 103–54	7–1	Stegeman Coliseum; Athens, Georgia
Dec 21, 1995*	No. 18	Mercer	W 95–68	8–1	Stegeman Coliseum; Athens, Georgia
Dec 30, 1995*	No. 16	Jacksonville	W 86–59	9–1	Stegeman Coliseum; Athens, Georgia
SEC Regular season
Jan 3, 1996	No. 14	Ole Miss	W 74–38	10–1 (1–0)	Stegeman Coliseum; Athens, Georgia
Jan 6, 1996	No. 14	at South Carolina	L 73–85	10–2 (1–1)	Carolina Coliseum; Columbia, South Carolina
Jan 13, 1996	No. 19	at Auburn	L 86–89	10–3 (1–2)	Beard-Eaves-Memorial Coliseum; Auburn, Alabama
Jan 17, 1996	No. 22	Florida	W 71–46	11–3 (2–2)	Stegeman Coliseum; Athens, Georgia
Jan 20, 1996	No. 22	at Tennessee	L 62–67	11–4 (2–3)	Thompson-Boling Arena; Knoxville, Tennessee
Jan 24, 1996; 8:00 p.m., JP Sports		No. 2 Kentucky	L 77–82	11–5 (2–4)	Stegeman Coliseum; Athens, Georgia
Jan 27, 1996		at Vanderbilt	L 62–66	11–6 (2–5)	Memorial Gymnasium; Nashville, Tennessee
Jan 31, 1996		at Mississippi State	L 73–76	11–7 (2–6)	Humphrey Coliseum; Starkville, Mississippi
Feb 3, 1996		Tennessee	W 68–49	12–7 (3–6)	Stegeman Coliseum; Athens, Georgia
Feb 7, 1996		at LSU	W 85–82	13–7 (4–6)	Maravich Assembly Center; Baton Rouge, Louisiana
Feb 10, 1996		Alabama	W 68–55	14–7 (5–6)	Stegeman Coliseum; Athens, Georgia
Feb 14, 1996		at No. 2 Kentucky	L 73–86	14–8 (5–7)	Rupp Arena; Lexington, Kentucky
Feb 21, 1996		Vanderbilt	W 77–68	15–8 (6–7)	Stegeman Coliseum; Athens, Georgia
Feb 25, 1996		Arkansas	W 71–59	16–8 (7–7)	Stegeman Coliseum; Athens, Georgia
Feb 28, 1996		at Florida	W 86–70	17–8 (8–7)	Stephen C. O'Connell Center; Gainesville, Florida
Mar 2, 1996		South Carolina	W 88–73	18–8 (9–7)	Stegeman Coliseum; Athens, Georgia
SEC Tournament
Mar 8, 1996*; JP Sports	(E2)	vs. (E6) Tennessee; Quarterfinals	W 74–63	19–8	Louisiana Superdome; New Orleans, Louisiana
Mar 9, 1996*; JP Sports	(E2)	vs. (W1) No. 25 Mississippi State; Semifinals	L 68–86	19–9	Louisiana Superdome; New Orleans, Louisiana
NCAA Tournament
Mar 14, 1996*; CBS	(8 W)	vs. (9 W) Clemson; First Round	W 81–74	20–9	The Pit; Albuquerque, New Mexico
Mar 16, 1996*; CBS	(8 W)	vs. (1 W) No. 4 Purdue; Second Round	W 76–69	21–9	The Pit; Albuquerque, New Mexico
Mar 22, 1996*; CBS	(8 W)	vs. (4 W) No. 15 Syracuse; Sweet Sixteen	L 81–83 ^{OT}	21–10	McNichols Sports Arena; Denver, Colorado
*Non-conference game. ^{#}Rankings from AP Poll. (#) Tournament seedings in parentheses. W=West. All times are in Eastern Time.
