= 1995–96 George Mason Patriots men's basketball team =

American college basketball season

1995–96 George Mason Patriots men's basketball
- Conference: Colonial Athletic Association
- Record: 11–16 (6–10 CAA)
- Head coach: Paul Westhead (3rd season)
- Home arena: Patriot Center

1995–96 CAA men's basketball standings
	Conf.				Overall
Team	W		L	PCT	W		L	PCT
VCU†	14	–	2	.875	24	–	9	.727
Old Dominion	12	–	4	.750	18	–	13	.581
UNC Wilmington	9	–	7	.563	13	–	16	.448
American	8	–	8	.500	12	–	15	.444
East Carolina	8	–	8	.500	17	–	11	.607
William & Mary	6	–	10	.375	10	–	16	.385
James Madison	6	–	10	.375	10	–	20	.333
George Mason	6	–	10	.375	11	–	16	.407
Richmond	3	–	13	.188	8	–	20	.286
† 1996 CAA tournament winner Rankings from AP poll

The 1995–96 George Mason Patriots Men's basketball team represented George Mason University during the 1995–96 NCAA Division I men's basketball season. This was the 30th season for the program, the third under head coach Paul Westhead. The Patriots played their home games at the Patriot Center in Fairfax, Virginia.

== Honors and awards ==
Colonial Athletic Association First-team All-Conference

- Curtis McCants

== Player statistics ==
Player	GP	FG%	3FG%	FT%	RPG	APG	SPG	BPG	PPG
Curtis McCants	27	.442	.312	.833	4.0	8.3	1.3	0.0	22.0
Nate Langley	8	.432	.300	.667	3.4	1.0	4.6	0.3	21.9
Kenwan Alford	27	.591	.000	.518	9.7	1.4	1.6	0.6	16.8
G.C. Maracacci	7	.333	.310	.914	9.1	1.9	1.4	0.0	14.4
Jason Williams	27	.366	.376	.737	3.0	0.4	0.5	0.1	12.7
George Redd	27	.472	.444	.639	7.9	0.3	0.6	0.2	12.2
Contrell Scott	27	.343	.221	.750	1.6	1.9	1.2	0.0	6.4
Kevin Ward	8	.471	.000	.760	4.4	0.3	0.4	0.3	6.4
Mike Virtue	18	.425	.314	.563	4.6	0.4	0.4	0.6	4.6
Nik Mirich	27	.473	.000	.426	3.0	0.5	0.3	0.3	2.7
Michael Sharp	22	.621	.000	.188	3.9	0.3	0.4	0.7	1.8
Bernard Wanjara	17	.647	.000	.250	1.9	0.1	0.2	0.2	1.4
Shawn Williams	8	.333	1.000	.000	0.1	0.1	0.0	0.0	0.4
Joe Little	6	.333	.000	.000	0.3	0.3	0.0	0.0	0.3

== Schedule and results ==
Date time, TV	Rank^{#}	Opponent^{#}	Result	Record	Site city, state
Non-conference regular season
November 25, 1995*		Delaware State	W 139–73	1–0	Patriot Center; Fairfax, VA
November 28, 1995*		Troy State	W 142–127	2–0	Patriot Center; Fairfax, VA
December 2, 1995*		at Colorado	L 117–132 ^{OT}	2–1	Coors Events Center; Boulder, CO
December 9, 1995*		Ohio State	L 87–92	2–2	Patriot Center; Fairfax, VA
December 16, 1995*		West Virginia Tech (Div. II)	W 113–110	3–2	Patriot Center; Fairfax, VA
December 20, 1995*		at USC	L 97–118	3–3	L.A. Sports Arena; Los Angeles, CA
December 22, 1995*		at Long Beach State	L 84–98	3–4	The Pyramid; Long Beach
December 28, 1995*		Hampton	W 84–74	4–4	Patriot Center; Fairfax, VA
December 30, 1995*		at Morehead State	L 74–83	4–5	Ellis Johnson Arena; Morehead, KY
CAA regular season
January 4, 1996		UNC Wilmington	L 44–68	4–6 (0–1)	Patriot Center; Fairfax, VA
January 6, 1996		East Carolina	W 80–76	5–6 (1–1)	Patriot Center; Fairfax, VA
January 10, 1996		at VCU; Rivalry	L 74–86	5–7 (1–2)	Richmond Coliseum; Richmond, VA
January 13, 1996*		at Cal Poly	W 110–106	6–7	Robert A. Mott Athletics Center; San Luis Obispo, CA
January 17, 1996		at Old Dominion	L 86–103	6–8 (1–3)	Norfolk Scope; Norfolk, VA
January 20, 1996		at James Madison	L 72–80	6–9 (1–4)	JMU Convocation Center; Harrisonburg, VA
January 24, 1996		William & Mary	W 95–92	7–9 (2–4)	Patriot Center; Fairfax, VA
January 27, 1996		American	W 96–85	8–9 (3–4)	Patriot Center; Fairfax, VA
January 29, 1996		at Richmond	L 91–106	8–10 (3–5)	Robins Center; Richmond, VA
January 31, 1996		VCU; Rivalry	L 81–94	8–11 (3–6)	Patriot Center; Fairfax, VA
February 3, 1996		at UNC Wilmington	L 46–54	8–12 (3–7)	Trask Coliseum; Wilmington, NC
February 5, 1996		at East Carolina	W 92–78	9–12 (4–7)	Minges Coliseum; Greenville, NC
February 10, 1996		Richmond	W 98–91	10–12 (5–7)	Patriot Center; Fairfax, VA
February 14, 1996		Old Dominion	L 92–93 ^{OT}	10–13 (5–8)	Patriot Center; Fairfax, VA
February 17, 1996		at American	W 100–88	11–13 (6–8)	Bender Arena; Washington, DC
February 24, 1996		James Madison	L 80–81	11–14 (6–9)	Patriot Center; Fairfax, VA
February 26, 1996		at William & Mary	L 92–96	11–15 (6–10)	William & Mary Hall; Williamsburg, VA
1996 CAA tournament
March 1, 1996	(8)	vs. (9) Richmond; First Round	L 77–93	11–16	Richmond Coliseum; Richmond, VA
*Non-conference game. ^{#}Rankings from AP Poll. (#) Tournament seedings in parentheses. All times are in Eastern Time.
