= 1996 Sun Belt Conference men's basketball tournament =

- Classification: Division I
- Season: 1995–96
- Teams: 10
- Site: Barton Coliseum; Little Rock, AR
- Champions: New Orleans (2nd title)
- Winning coach: Tic Price (1st title)
- MVP: Lewis Sims (New Orleans)

1995–96 Sun Belt Conference men's basketball standings
| | Conf. | | | | Overall |
| Team | W | | L | PCT | W | | L | PCT |
|---|---|---|---|---|---|---|---|---|
| New Orleans † | 14 | – | 4 | .778 | 21 | – | 9 | .700 |
| Arkansas–Little Rock | 14 | – | 4 | .778 | 23 | – | 7 | .767 |
| Jacksonville | 10 | – | 8 | .556 | 15 | – | 13 | .536 |
| Western Kentucky | 10 | – | 8 | .556 | 13 | – | 14 | .481 |
| Southwestern Louisiana | 9 | – | 9 | .500 | 16 | – | 12 | .571 |
| Lamar | 7 | – | 11 | .389 | 12 | – | 15 | .444 |
| South Alabama | 7 | – | 11 | .389 | 12 | – | 15 | .444 |
| Arkansas State | 7 | – | 11 | .389 | 9 | – | 18 | .333 |
| Louisiana Tech | 6 | – | 12 | .333 | 11 | – | 17 | .393 |
| Texas–Pan American | 6 | – | 12 | .333 | 9 | – | 19 | .321 |
† 1996 Sun Belt Conference tournament winner Rankings from AP Poll

The 1996 Sun Belt Conference men's basketball tournament was held March 1–5 at Barton Coliseum in Little Rock, Arkansas.

New Orleans defeated hosts, and fellow regular season co-champions, Arkansas–Little Rock in the championship game, 57–56, to win their second Sun Belt men's basketball tournament. It was UNO's first Sun Belt title since 1978 and first since being re-admitted to the conference in 1992.

The Privateers, in turn, received an automatic bid to the 1996 NCAA tournament. No other Sun Belt members were invited to the tournament.

== Format ==
No teams left or joined the Sun Belt before the season, leaving conference membership fixed at ten teams.

With all teams participating in the tournament this year, the field increased from nine to ten teams. With all teams seeded based on regular-season conference records, the top six teams were all placed directly into the quarterfinal round while the four lowest-seeded teams were placed into the preliminary first round.

== Bracket ==
First round Friday, March 1
9 | Louisiana Tech | 70
8 | Arkansas State | 65
7 | South Alabama | 48
10 | Texas–Pan American | 61

Quarterfinals; Saturday, March 2
1 | New Orleans | 67
9 | Louisiana Tech | 57
5 | SW Louisiana | 98
4 | Western Kentucky | 94
3 | Jacksonville | 63
6 | Lamar | 62
10 | UTPA | 71
2 | Arkansas–Little Rock | 89

Semifinals; Sunday, March 3
1 | New Orleans | 75
5 | SW Louisiana | 71
3 | Jacksonville | 60
2 | Arkansas–Little Rock | 67

Championship; Tuesday, March 5
1 | New Orleans | 57
2 | Arkansas–Little Rock | 56

== See also ==
- Sun Belt Conference women's basketball tournament
