= 1995–96 Auburn Tigers men's basketball team =

American college basketball season

1995–96 Auburn Tigers men's basketball

Puerto Rico Shootout champions Dr. Pepper Invitational champions Capital City Classic champions

NIT, First Round
- Conference: Southeastern Conference
- West
- Record: 19–13 (6–10 SEC)
- Head coach: Cliff Ellis (2nd season)
- Captains: Ray Donald; Wes Flanigan; Lance Weems
- Home arena: Beard–Eaves–Memorial Coliseum

1995–96 Southeastern Conference men's basketball standings
	Conf.				Overall
Team	W		L	PCT	W		L	PCT
East
No. 2 Kentucky	16	–	0	1.000	34	–	2	.944
Georgia	9	–	7	.563	21	–	10	.677
South Carolina	8	–	8	.500	19	–	12	.613
Vanderbilt	7	–	9	.438	18	–	14	.563
Florida	6	–	10	.375	12	–	16	.429
Tennessee	6	–	10	.375	14	–	15	.483
West
No. 19 Mississippi State †	10	–	6	.625	26	–	8	.765
Arkansas	9	–	7	.563	20	–	13	.606
Alabama	9	–	7	.563	19	–	13	.594
Ole Miss	6	–	10	.375	12	–	15	.444
Auburn	6	–	10	.375	19	–	13	.594
LSU	4	–	12	.250	12	–	17	.414
† 1996 SEC tournament winner Rankings from AP Poll

The 1995–96 Auburn Tigers men's basketball team represented Auburn University in the 1995–96 college basketball season. The team's head coach was Cliff Ellis, who was in his second season at Auburn. The team played their home games at Beard–Eaves–Memorial Coliseum in Auburn, Alabama. They finished the season 19–13, 6–10 in SEC play. They defeated Vanderbilt to advance to the quarterfinals of the SEC tournament where they lost to Mississippi State. They received an invitation to the National Invitation Tournament, where they lost to Tulane in the first round.
