= 1995–96 Arkansas Razorbacks men's basketball team =

American college basketball season

1995–96 Arkansas Razorbacks men's basketball

NCAA tournament, Sweet Sixteen
- Conference: Southeastern Conference
- West

Ranking
- Coaches: No. 18
- Record: 20–13 (9–7 SEC)
- Head coach: Nolan Richardson (11th season)
- Home arena: Bud Walton Arena

1995–96 Southeastern Conference men's basketball standings
	Conf.				Overall
Team	W		L	PCT	W		L	PCT
East
No. 2 Kentucky	16	–	0	1.000	34	–	2	.944
Georgia	9	–	7	.563	21	–	10	.677
South Carolina	8	–	8	.500	19	–	12	.613
Vanderbilt	7	–	9	.438	18	–	14	.563
Florida	6	–	10	.375	12	–	16	.429
Tennessee	6	–	10	.375	14	–	15	.483
West
No. 19 Mississippi State †	10	–	6	.625	26	–	8	.765
Arkansas	9	–	7	.563	20	–	13	.606
Alabama	9	–	7	.563	19	–	13	.594
Ole Miss	6	–	10	.375	12	–	15	.444
Auburn	6	–	10	.375	19	–	13	.594
LSU	4	–	12	.250	12	–	17	.414
† 1996 SEC tournament winner Rankings from AP Poll

The 1995–96 Arkansas Razorbacks men's basketball team represented the University of Arkansas in the 1995–96 college basketball season. The head coach was Nolan Richardson, serving for his 11th year. The team played its home games in Bud Walton Arena in Fayetteville, Arkansas.

== Roster ==
1995–96 Arkansas Razorbacks men's basketball team
Players
Coaches

Pos.	#	Name	Height	Weight	Year	Previous school	Hometown
F		Sunday Adebayo	6 ft 6 in (1.98 m)	—	So	Three Rivers	Benin City, Nigeria
G		Pat Bradley	6 ft 2 in (1.88 m)	—	Fr	Everett HS	Everett, MA
F		Nick Davis	6 ft 9 in (2.06 m)	—	Fr
G		John Engskov	6 ft 3 in (1.91 m)	—	Sr
F		Antwon Hall	6 ft 4 in (1.93 m)	—	Jr
F		Derek Hood	6 ft 8 in (2.03 m)	—	Fr	Central HS	Kansas City, MO
G		Reggie Merritt	6 ft 1 in (1.85 m)	—	Sr
G		Jesse Pate	6 ft 4 in (1.93 m)	—	Jr
G		Kareem Reid	5 ft 11 in (1.8 m)	—	Fr	St. Raymond HS	The Bronx, NY
C		Darnell Robinson	6 ft 11 in (2.11 m)	—	Jr	Emery HS	Emeryville, CA
F		Ali Thompson	6 ft 5 in (1.96 m)	—	Fr
G		Marlon Towns	6 ft 5 in (1.96 m)	—	Fr
G		Guy Whitney	6 ft 5 in (1.96 m)	—	So
F		Landis Williams	6 ft 7 in (2.01 m)	—	So
C		Lee Wilson	6 ft 11 in (2.11 m)	—	Jr

Head coach

- Nolan Richardson (UTEP)

Assistant coach(es)

Legend

- (C) Team captain
- (S) Suspended
- (I) Ineligible
- (W) Walk-on
- Injured
- Current redshirt

Roster
Last update: October 24, 2022
