= 1996 SEC men's basketball tournament =

- Classification: Division I
- Season: 1995–96
- Teams: 12
- Site: Louisiana Superdome; New Orleans, Louisiana (USA)
- Champions: Mississippi State (1st title)
- Winning coach: Richard Williams (1st title)
- MVP: Dontae' Jones (Mississippi State)
- Attendance: 195,836
- Television: Jefferson Pilot Sports (Entire tournament); CBS (Championship game; available nationally and outside the SEC footprint)

1995–96 Southeastern Conference men's basketball standings
	Conf.				Overall
Team	W		L	PCT	W		L	PCT
East
No. 2 Kentucky	16	–	0	1.000	34	–	2	.944
Georgia	9	–	7	.563	21	–	10	.677
South Carolina	8	–	8	.500	19	–	12	.613
Vanderbilt	7	–	9	.438	18	–	14	.563
Florida	6	–	10	.375	12	–	16	.429
Tennessee	6	–	10	.375	14	–	15	.483
West
No. 19 Mississippi State †	10	–	6	.625	26	–	8	.765
Arkansas	9	–	7	.563	20	–	13	.606
Alabama	9	–	7	.563	19	–	13	.594
Ole Miss	6	–	10	.375	12	–	15	.444
Auburn	6	–	10	.375	19	–	13	.594
LSU	4	–	12	.250	12	–	17	.414
† 1996 SEC tournament winner Rankings from AP Poll

The 1996 SEC men's basketball tournament took place from March 7–10, 1996, at the Louisiana Superdome in New Orleans, Louisiana. The Mississippi State Bulldogs won the tournament title and received the SEC's automatic bid to the NCAA tournament by beating the Kentucky Wildcats by a score of 84–73. This was the first time the Mississippi State men's basketball team won the SEC tournament.

== Television coverage ==
Jefferson Pilot Sports regionally broadcast and syndicated coverage of the first round, the quarterfinals, and the semi-finals. Play-by-play commentary was done by Tom Hammond with color analyst Joe Dean, Jr. The championship game was broadcast nationally on CBS, called by play-by-play commentator Sean McDonough and color analyst Bill Raftery.

== Bracket ==
First round
E5	Florida	75
W4	Ole Miss	62
E3	South Carolina	85
W6	LSU	76
W5	Auburn	68
E4	Vanderbilt	65
E6	Tennessee	77
W3	Alabama	65

Second Round
E1	#1 Kentucky	100
E5	Florida	76
W2	Arkansas	80
E3	South Carolina	58
W1	#25 Mississippi State	69
W5	Auburn	58
E2	Georgia	74
E6	Tennessee	63

Semifinals
E1	#1 Kentucky	95
W2	Arkansas	75
W1	#25 Mississippi State	86
E2	Georgia	68

Championship Game
E1	#1 Kentucky	73
W1	#25 Mississippi State	84
