= Dontae' Jones =

American basketball player (born 1975)

Personal information
- Born: June 2, 1975 (age 51) Nashville, Tennessee, U.S.
- Listed height: 6 ft 8 in (2.03 m)
- Listed weight: 220 lb (100 kg)

Career information
- High school: Stratford (Nashville, Tennessee)
- College: Northeast Mississippi CC (1993–1995); Mississippi State (1995–1996)
- NBA draft: 1996: 1st round, 21st overall pick
- Drafted by: New York Knicks
- Playing career: 1996–2010
- Position: Small forward
- Number: 13

Career history
- 1997–1998: Boston Celtics
- 1999–2000: La Crosse Bobcats
- 2000–2001: Memphis Houn'Dawgs
- 2001–2002: Toros de Aragua
- 2001–2003: Pompea Napoli
- 2003: Vaqueros de Bayamón
- 2003–2004: Apollon Patras
- 2004–2007: Anyang SBS Stars·KT&G Kites
- 2007–2008: Yunnan Bulls
- 2008–2009: Beijing Ducks
- 2009–2010: Halcones UV Xalapa

Career highlights
- CBA scoring champion (2008); ABA All Star-Game (2005); SEC tournament MVP (1996)
- Stats at NBA.com
- Stats at Basketball Reference

Dontae' Antijuaine Jones (born June 2, 1975) is an American former professional basketball player. A small forward, he played for the Boston Celtics of the National Basketball Association (NBA) in 1997 and 1998.

== Playing career ==
Jones played college basketball at Northeast Mississippi Community College where he is the Tigers' all-time leading scorer, rebounder, and shot blocker. His #32 jersey has been retired by the school. After playing two seasons for the Tigers, he transferred to the Mississippi State Bulldogs program to finish his college career.

He was named most valuable player of the 1996 SEC men's basketball tournament after leading Mississippi State to their first SEC Tournament championship by virtue of a win over top-ranked University of Kentucky in the SEC tournament championship game. That same season, he led Mississippi State to the NCAA Men's Basketball Final Four, picking up a Regional MVP honor along the way. Jones, along with his 1995–96 Bulldog teammates, was inducted into the Mississippi Sports Hall of Fame in 2016.

Jones was selected out of Mississippi State University by the New York Knicks as the 21st overall pick in the 1996 NBA draft but was traded, along with Walter McCarty, John Thomas and Scott Brooks, to the Celtics in exchange for Chris Mills shortly before the 1997–98 NBA season began (he had previously taken part in no games in 1996–97 with the Knicks due to a foot injury).

After his NBA season, Jones played for the Memphis Houn'Dawgs in the American Basketball Association (ABA), and in Greece, Turkey, Italy, Korea and China.

== Post-retirement ==
As of November 2012, Jones has been working as the program director at the Nashville Youth Basketball Association (NYBA), which is designed to help all middle Tennessee-area and Nashville city youth in metro Nashville improve their basketball skills. He is regarded as a youth coach.

== Personal life ==
An apostrophe was intentionally placed on the end of his first name by his mother for distinctiveness.
