= 1995–96 Kentucky Wildcats men's basketball team =

1995–96 season of University of Kentucky men's basketball team

1995–1996 Kentucky Wildcats men's basketball
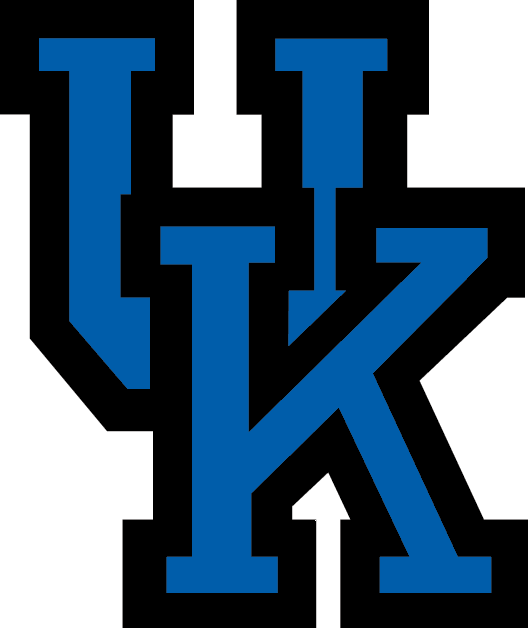

NCAA tournament National Champions Coaches Poll regular season champions SEC regular season champions

National Championship Game, W 76–67 vs. Syracuse
- Conference: Southeastern Conference

Ranking
- Coaches: No. 1
- AP: No. 2
- Record: 34–2 (16–0 SEC)
- Head coach: Rick Pitino (7th season)
- Assistant coaches: Jim O'Brien; Winston Bennett; Delray Brooks
- Home arena: Rupp Arena

1995–96 Southeastern Conference men's basketball standings
	Conf.				Overall
Team	W		L	PCT	W		L	PCT
East
No. 2 Kentucky	16	–	0	1.000	34	–	2	.944
Georgia	9	–	7	.563	21	–	10	.677
South Carolina	8	–	8	.500	19	–	12	.613
Vanderbilt	7	–	9	.438	18	–	14	.563
Florida	6	–	10	.375	12	–	16	.429
Tennessee	6	–	10	.375	14	–	15	.483
West
No. 19 Mississippi State †	10	–	6	.625	26	–	8	.765
Arkansas	9	–	7	.563	20	–	13	.606
Alabama	9	–	7	.563	19	–	13	.594
Ole Miss	6	–	10	.375	12	–	15	.444
Auburn	6	–	10	.375	19	–	13	.594
LSU	4	–	12	.250	12	–	17	.414
† 1996 SEC tournament winner Rankings from AP Poll

The 1995–96 Kentucky Wildcats men's basketball team represented the University of Kentucky in the 1995–96 college basketball season. Coached by Rick Pitino, the team finished the season with a 34–2 record and won the NCAA Men's Division I Basketball Championship over the Syracuse University Orangemen, 76–67.

Also known as "The Untouchables", nine players from the 1995–96 team eventually played in the NBA. These players were Derek Anderson, Tony Delk, Walter McCarty, Ron Mercer, Nazr Mohammed, Mark Pope, Jeff Sheppard, Wayne Turner, and Antoine Walker. The 1995–96 Kentucky team is widely regarded as one of the greatest teams in NCAA Division I Men's Basketball history.

== Roster ==
1995–96 Kentucky Wildcats men's basketball team
Players
Coaches

Pos.	#	Name	Height	Weight	Year	Hometown
G	00	Tony Delk	6 ft 1 in (1.85 m)	—	Sr	Brownsville, TN
G/F	3	Allen Edwards	6 ft 5 in (1.96 m)	—	So	Miami, FL
G	5	Wayne Turner	6 ft 2 in (1.88 m)	—	Fr	Boston, MA
C	13	Nazr Mohammed	6 ft 10 in (2.08 m)	—	Fr	Chicago, IL
G	15	Jeff Sheppard	6 ft 4 in (1.93 m)	—	Jr	Peachtree City, GA
G	21	Cameron Mills	6 ft 3 in (1.91 m)	—	So	Lexington, KY
G/F	23	Derek Anderson	6 ft 6 in (1.98 m)	—	Jr	Louisville, KY
F	24	Antoine Walker	6 ft 8 in (2.03 m)	—	So	Chicago, IL
G	25	Anthony Epps	6 ft 2 in (1.88 m)	—	Jr	Lebanon, KY
F	32	Jared Prickett (redshirt)	6 ft 9 in (2.06 m)	—	Jr	Fairmont, WV
F	33	Ron Mercer	6 ft 7 in (2.01 m)	—	Fr	Nashville, TN
F	40	Walter McCarty	6 ft 11 in (2.11 m)	—	Sr	Evansville, IN
C	41	Mark Pope	6 ft 10 in (2.08 m)	—	Sr	Bellevue, WA
F	43	Jason Lathrem	6 ft 5 in (1.96 m)	—	Fr	Bowling Green, KY
G	51	Oliver Simmons	6 ft 8 in (2.03 m)	—	Fr	Nashville, TN

Head coach

- Rick Pitino

Assistant coach(es)

- Jim O'Brien
- Winston Bennett
- Delray Brooks

Legend

- (C) Team captain
- (S) Suspended
- (I) Ineligible
- (W) Walk-on
- Injured
- Current redshirt

== Schedule ==
Date time, TV	Rank^{#}	Opponent^{#}	Result	Record	Site (attendance) city, state
Exhibition
7 November 1995*; UKTV		Cagiva Varese	W 98–74		Rupp Arena (–); Lexington, KY
17 November 1995*; UKTV		Athletes in Action	W 119–80		Rupp Arena (–); Lexington, KY
Regular Season
24 November 1995*; ESPN	No. 1	vs. No. 14 Maryland; Tip-off Classic	W 96–84	1–0	Springfield Civic Center (8,999); Springfield, MA
28 November 1995*; ESPN	No. 1	vs. No. 5 Massachusetts; Great Eight	L 82–92	1–1	The Palace (15,454); Auburn Hills, MI
2 December 1995*; 3:00 p.m., CBS	No. 1	vs. Indiana	W 89–82	2–1	RCA Dome (41,071); Indianapolis, IN
6 December 1995*; UKTV	No. 5	Green Bay	W 74–62	3–1	Rupp Arena (22,825); Lexington, KY
9 December 1995*; 8:30 p.m., ESPN	No. 5	No. 16 Georgia Tech	W 83–60	4–1	Rupp Arena (24,238); Lexington, KY
16 December 1995*; UKTV	No. 5	Morehead State	W 96–32	5–1	Rupp Arena (24,065); Lexington, KY
19 December 1995*; UKTV	No. 5	vs. Marshall	W 118–99	6–1	Freedom Hall (19,795); Louisville, KY
23 December 1995*; 3:00 p.m., CBS	No. 4	No. 25 Louisville	W 89–66	7–1	Rupp Arena (24,340); Lexington, KY
27 December 1995*; UKTV	No. 2	vs. Rider; ECAC Holiday Festival	W 90–65	8–1	Madison Square Garden (13,175); New York, NY
29 December 1995*; UKTV	No. 2	vs. Iona; ECAC Holiday Festival	W 106–79	9–1	Madison Square Garden (13,659); New York, NY
3 January 1996; 8:00 p.m., JP	No. 2	at South Carolina	W 89–60	10–1 (1–0)	Frank McGuire Arena (12,068); Columbia, SC
6 January 1996; UKTV	No. 2	Ole Miss	W 90–60	11–1 (2–0)	Rupp Arena (21,275); Lexington, KY
9 January 1996; 9:30 p.m., ESPN	No. 2	at No. 12 Mississippi State	W 74–56	12–1 (3–0)	Humphrey Coliseum (10,315); Starkville, MS
13 January 1996; UKTV	No. 2	Tennessee	W 61–44	13–1 (4–0)	Rupp Arena (24,247); Lexington, KY
16 January 1996; 9:30 p.m., ESPN	No. 2	at LSU	W 129–97	14–1 (5–0)	Pete Maravich Assembly Center (12,684); Baton Rouge, LA
20 January 1996*; 7:15 p.m., ESPN	No. 2	TCU	W 124–80	15–1	Rupp Arena (24,189); Lexington, KY
24 January 1996; 8:00 p.m., JP	No. 2	at Georgia	W 82–77	16–1 (6–0)	Stegeman Coliseum (10,523); Athens, GA
27 January 1996; 8:00 p.m., UKTV	No. 2	South Carolina	W 89–57	17–1 (7–0)	Rupp Arena (24,229); Lexington, KY
3 February 1996; 1:00 p.m., JP	No. 2	Florida	W 77–63	18–1 (8–0)	Rupp Arena (24,251); Lexington, KY
7 February 1996; 8:00 p.m., JP	No. 2	at Vanderbilt	W 120–81	19–1 (9–0)	Memorial Gymnasium (15,311); Nashville, TN
11 February 1996; 3:00 p.m., CBS	No. 2	Arkansas	W 88–73	20–1 (10–0)	Rupp Arena (24,336); Lexington, KY
13 February 1996; 8:00 p.m., JP	No. 2	Georgia	W 86–73	21–1 (11–0)	Rupp Arena (24,206); Lexington, KY
17 February 1996; 3:00 p.m., JP	No. 2	at Tennessee	W 90–50	22–1 (12–0)	Thompson-Boling Arena (23,115); Knoxville, TN
20 February 1996; 9:30 p.m., ESPN	No. 2	Alabama	W 84–65	23–1 (13–0)	Rupp Arena (24,175); Lexington, KY
24 February 1996; 1:00 p.m., CBS	No. 2	at Florida	W 94–63	24–1 (14–0)	Stephen C. O'Connell Center (10,697); Gainesville, FL
27 February 1996; 9:30 p.m., ESPN	No. 2	at Auburn	W 88–73	25–1 (15–0)	Beard-Eaves Memorial Coliseum (10,108); Auburn, AL
2 March 1996; UKTV	No. 1	Vanderbilt; Homecoming	W 101–63	26–1 (16–0)	Rupp Arena (24,257); Lexington, KY
SEC tournament
8 March 1996; JP	(E1) No. 1	vs. (E5) Florida; Quarterfinals	W 100–76	27–1	Louisiana Superdome (21,248); New Orleans, LA
9 March 1996; JP	(E1) No. 1	vs. (W2) Arkansas; Semifinals	W 95–75	28–1	Louisiana Superdome (24,556); New Orleans, LA
10 March 1996; CBS	(E1) No. 1	vs. (W1) No. 25 Mississippi State; Championship	L 73–84	28–2	Louisiana Superdome (24,462); New Orleans, LA
NCAA tournament
14 March 1996*; CBS	(1 MW) No. 2	vs. (16 MW) San Jose State; First Round	W 110–72	29–2	Reunion Arena (13,458); Dallas, TX
16 March 1996*; CBS	(1 MW) No. 2	vs. (9 MW) No. 16 Virginia Tech; Second Round	W 84–60	30–2	Reunion Arena (15,469); Dallas, TX
21 March 1996*; CBS	(1 MW) No. 2	vs. (4 MW) No. 10 Utah; Sweet Sixteen	W 101–70	31–2	Hubert H. Humphrey Metrodome (30,334); Minneapolis, MN
23 March 1996*; CBS	(1 MW) No. 2	vs. (2 MW) No. 13 Wake Forest; Elite Eight	W 83–63	32–2	Hubert H. Humphrey Metrodome (30,397); Minneapolis, MN
30 March 1996*; CBS	(1 MW) No. 2	vs. (1 E) No. 1 Massachusetts; Final Four	W 81–74	33–2	Continental Airlines Arena (19,229); East Rutherford, NJ
1 April 1996*; CBS	(1 MW) No. 2	vs. (4 W) No. 15 Syracuse; National Championship	W 76–67	34–2	Continental Airlines Arena (19,229); East Rutherford, NJ
*Non-conference game. ^{#}Rankings from AP Poll. (#) Tournament seedings in parentheses.

== Rankings ==
Ranking movements Legend: ██ Increase in ranking ██ Decrease in ranking
	Week																		
Poll	Pre	1	2	3	4	5	6	7	8	9	10	11	12	13	14	15	16	17	Final
AP	1	1	1	5	5	4	2	2	2	2	2	2	2	2	2	1	1	2	Not released
Coaches	1	1	1	5	5	4	2	2	2	2	2	2	2	2	2	1	1	2	1

== Awards and honors ==
- Tony Delk, NCAA Men's MOP Award

== Players drafted into the NBA ==
Round	Pick	Player	NBA club
1	6	Antoine Walker	Boston Celtics
1	16	Tony Delk	Charlotte Hornets
1	19	Walter McCarty	Portland Trail Blazers
2	23 (52)	Mark Pope	Indiana Pacers
