= Bernard Hopkins (basketball) =

American-Spanish basketball player

Personal information
- Born: January 13, 1973 (age 53) Baltimore, Maryland, U.S.
- Listed height: 6 ft 6 in (1.98 m)
- Listed weight: 235 lb (107 kg)

Career information
- High school: Overlea (Baltimore, Maryland)
- College: Hagerstown CC (1992–1994); VCU (1994–1996)
- NBA draft: 1996: undrafted
- Playing career: 1996–2012
- Position: Power forward

Career history
- 1996–1997: Yakima Sun Kings
- 1997–1998: CB Gran Canaria
- 1998–2003: Valencia BC
- 2003–2005: Tenerife CB
- 2005–2007: CB Valladolid
- 2007–2010: Gipuzkoa BC
- 2010–2012: Obradoiro CAB

Career highlights
- All-CBA Second Team (1997); CBA Rookie of the Year (1997); CBA All-Rookie First Team (1997); No. 4 retired by Obradoiro CAB; CAA Player of the Year (1996); First-team All-CAA (1996); CAA tournament MVP (1996)

Bernard Anthony Hopkins White (born January 13, 1973) is an American-Spanish retired professional basketball player. Hopkins is a 6'6", 235-pound power forward. He played college ball at Hagerstown Community College for two seasons before transferring to Virginia Commonwealth University (VCU) for his final two. As a senior in 1995–96, Hopkins was named the 1996 CAA men's basketball tournament MVP as well as the Colonial Athletic Association Men's Basketball Player of the Year.

== College career ==
Hopkins, a native of Baltimore, Maryland, was a standout basketball player in high school and graduated in 1992. He spent his first two seasons playing approximately one hour away in nearby Hagerstown at its community college. He then transferred to VCU to play for the Rams, and in just two years became a highly decorated player in the school's history. During his junior season, Hopkins shot 58.5% from the field and finished with the 25th best shooting percentage in the country. He then broke out during his senior year when he scored 538 points, grabbed 333 rebounds (third highest ever at VCU), compiled 19 double-doubles and guided the Rams to both the conference regular season and tournament championships. In the first round of the 1996 NCAA Men's Division I Basketball Tournament, which the Rams would lose to Mississippi State by seven, Hopkins was named the CBS Chevrolet Player of the Game. Also as a senior, he became the CAA's first player to record 500+ points, 300+ rebounds, 70+ assists and shoot better than 50% from the field in a single season. He was named the CAA Tournament MVP as well as the CAA Player of the Year. For his career, Hopkins scored 950 career points.

== Professional career ==
Hopkins was invited to the Portsmouth Invitational Tournament following his senior season, the only postseason camp conducted for just the top NCAA seniors. It is a chance to impress National Basketball Association (NBA) scouts to possibly get drafted in that respective year's NBA draft. Hopkins was named the MVP of the tournament yet failed to get drafted a month later. Instead, the Continental Basketball Association's Yakima Sun Kings selected him third overall in their draft. He played for the Sun Kings for one season where he was named the Rookie of the Year and got selected to the All-CBA Second and All-Rookie First teams.

Since 1998–99 he has played for various teams, all in Spain, and became a naturalized citizen of that country. His career highlights include being named a Liga ACB All-Star in 1999 and 2001, a five-time Player of the Month and a 24-time Player of the Week.

On November 6, 2012, Blu:sens Monbús, his last team in Spain, announced it will retire his number 4 at the end of the 2012–13 season.

== Personal ==
Hopkins became a naturalized citizen of Spain during his time playing in that country.
