= George Washington Revolutionaries men's basketball statistical leaders =

The George Washington Revolutionaries men's basketball statistical leaders are individual statistical leaders of the George Washington Revolutionaries men's basketball program (GW) in various categories, including points, rebounds, assists, steals, and blocks. Within those areas, the lists identify single-game, single-season, and career leaders. The Revolutionaries, known before the 2023–24 season as the Colonials, represent George Washington University in the NCAA Division I Atlantic 10 Conference.

GW began competing in intercollegiate basketball in 1906. However, the school's record book does not generally list records from before the 1950s, as records from before this period are often incomplete and inconsistent. Since scoring was much lower in this era, and teams played much fewer games during a typical season, it is likely that few or no players from this era would appear on these lists anyway.

The NCAA did not officially record assists as a stat until the 1983–84 season, and blocks and steals until the 1985–86 season, but George Washington's record books includes players in these stats before these seasons. These lists are updated through the end of the 2021–22 season.

== Scoring ==
Career
Rank	Player	Points	Seasons
1	Chris Monroe	2,248	1999–00 2000–01 2001–02 2002–03
2	Joe Holup	2,226	1952–53 1953–54 1954–55 1955–56
3	James Bishop IV	2,103	2020–21 2021–22 2022–23 2023–24
4	Mike Brown	1,916	1981–82 1982–83 1983–84 1984–85
5	Pat Tallent	1,725	1972–73 1973–74 1974–75 1975–76
6	Kwame Evans	1,706	1992–93 1993–94 1994–95 1995–96
7	Shawnta Rogers	1,701	1995–96 1996–97 1997–98 1998–99
8	Alexander Koul	1,656	1994–95 1995–96 1996–97 1997–98
9	Yegor Mescheriakov	1,645	1995–96 1996–97 1997–98 1998–99
10	Dirkk Surles	1,607	1989–90 1990–91 1991–92 1992–93

Season
Rank	Player	Points	Season
1	Sirvaliant Brown	738	1999–00
2	Bob Tallent	723	1968–69
3	James Bishop IV	691	2022–23
4	Corky Devlin	679	1954–55
5	Joe Holup	651	1955–56
6	Tyler Cavanaugh	640	2016–17
7	Tyler Cavanaugh	638	2015–16
8	Pat Tallent	622	1975–76
	Kwame Evans	622	1994–95
10	Joe Holup	601	1954–55
	Shawnta Rogers	601	1998–99

Single game
Rank	Player	Points	Season	Opponent
1	Joe Holup	49	1955–56	Furman

== Rebounds ==
Career
Rank	Player	Rebounds	Seasons
1	Joe Holup	2,030	1952–53 1953–54 1954–55 1955–56
2	Mike Brown	1,166	1981–82 1982–83 1983–84 1984–85
3	Gene Guarilia	1,019	1956–57 1957–58 1958–59
4	Joe Adamitis	965	1961–62 1962–63 1963–64
5	Kevin Larsen	952	2012–13 2013–14 2014–15 2015–16
6	Mike Hall	923	2002–03 2003–04 2004–05 2005–06
7	Clyde Burwell	907	1972–73 1973–74 1974–75
8	Alexander Koul	889	1994–95 1995–96 1996–97 1997–98
9	Mike Zagardo	824	1976–77 1977–78 1978–79 1979–80
10	Les Anderson	816	1974–75 1975–76 1976–77 1977–78

Season
Rank	Player	Rebounds	Season
1	Joe Holup	604	1955–56
2	Joe Holup	546	1954–55
3	Joe Holup	484	1953–54
4	Gene Guarilia	447	1956–57
5	Joe Adamitis	417	1963–64
6	Joe Holup	396	1952–53
7	Mike Brown	351	1983–84
8	Walt Szczerbiak	324	1970–71
	Clyde Burwell	324	1973–74
10	Joe Petcavich	314	1954–55

Single game
Rank	Player	Rebounds	Season	Opponent
	Clyde Burwell	29	1973–74	Mount St. Mary's

== Assists ==
Career
Rank	Player	Assists	Seasons
1	Shawnta Rogers	634	1995–96 1996–97 1997–98 1998–99
2	Carl Elliott	539	2003–04 2004–05 2005–06 2006–07
3	Alvin Pearsall	497	1990–91 1991–92 1992–93 1993–94
4	Tony Taylor	486	2008–09 2009–10 2010–11 2011–12
5	T.J. Thompson	484	2001–02 2002–03 2003–04 2004–05
6	Joe McDonald	447	2012–13 2013–14 2014–15 2015–16
	James Bishop IV	447	2020–21 2021–22 2022–23 2023–24
8	Mike O'Reilly	401	1982–83 1983–84 1984–85 1985–86
9	Ellis McKennie	397	1986–87 1987–88 1988–89 1989–90 1990–91
10	Tom Tate	392	1975–76 1976–77 1977–78 1978–79

Season
Rank	Player	Assists	Season
1	Shawnta Rogers	196	1998–99
2	Ellis McKennie	179	1989–90
3	T.J. Thompson	177	2002–03
4	Alvin Pearsall	176	1991–92
5	James Bishop IV	165	2022–23
6	Armel Potter	161	2019–20
7	Shawnta Rogers	159	1997–98
8	Bernard Barrow	157	1999–00
9	Carl Elliott	154	2006–07
10	Shawnta Rogers	150	1995–96

Single game
Rank	Player	Assists	Season	Opponent
1	Ellis McKennie	15	1989–90	St. Bonaventure

== Steals ==
Career
Rank	Player	Steals	Seasons
1	Shawnta Rogers	310	1995–96 1996–97 1997–98 1998–99
2	Carl Elliott	281	2003–04 2004–05 2005–06 2006–07
3	Patricio Garino	220	2012–13 2013–14 2014–15 2015–16
4	Ellis McKennie	191	1986–87 1987–88 1988–89 1989–90 1990–91
5	Mike King	175	1997–98 1998–99 1999–00 2000–01
6	Joe McDonald	172	2012–13 2013–14 2014–15 2015–16
7	Danilo Pinnock	164	2003–04 2004–05 2005–06
8	T.J. Thompson	158	2001–02 2002–03 2003–04 2004–05
9	Lasan Kromah	149	2009–10 2011–12 2012–13
10	Alvin Pearsall	140	1990–91 1991–92 1992–93 1993–94

Season
Rank	Player	Steals	Season
1	Shawnta Rogers	103	1998–99
2	Carl Elliott	83	2006–07
3	Ellis McKennie	82	1989–90
4	Shawnta Rogers	81	1996–97
5	Shawnta Rogers	80	1997–98
6	Carl Elliott	79	2004–05
7	Bernard Barrow	77	1999–00
8	Danilo Pinnock	72	2005–06
9	Patricio Garino	68	2012–13
10	Curtis Jeffries	63	1979–80

Single game
Rank	Player	Steals	Season	Opponent
1	Lasan Kromah	9	2011–12	UAB

== Blocks ==
Career
Rank	Player	Blocks	Seasons
1	Alexander Koul	188	1994–95 1995–96 1996–97 1997–98
2	Yuta Watanabe	147	2014–15 2015–16 2016–17 2017–18
3	Rob Diggs	144	2005–06 2006–07 2007–08 2008–09
4	Pops Mensah-Bonsu	141	2002–03 2003–04 2004–05 2005–06
5	Yinka Dare	140	1992–93 1993–94
6	Jason Smith	128	1998–99 1999–00 2000–01 2001–02
7	Isaiah Armwood	119	2012–13 2013–14
8	Jabari Edwards	114	2007–08 2008–09 2009–10 2010–11 2011–12
9	Omar Williams	108	2002–03 2003–04 2004–05 2005–06
10	Kevin Larsen	101	2012–13 2013–14 2014–15 2015–16

Season
Rank	Player	Blocks	Season
1	Yinka Dare	84	1992–93
	Babatunde Akingbola	84	2023–24
3	Isaiah Armwood	68	2012–13
4	Jason Smith	62	2001–02
5	Rob Diggs	60	2006–07
6	Byron Hopkins	58	1990–91
7	Yinka Dare	56	1993–94
8	Yuta Watanabe	54	2017–18
9	Alexander Koul	53	1994–95
	Alexander Koul	53	1995–96

Single game
Rank	Player	Blocks	Season	Opponent
1	Babatunde Akingbola	11	2023–24	Navy
2	Kevin Hall	10	1975–76	JMU
