= BB&T Classic =

- Sport: Men's college basketball
- Founded: 1995
- Folded: 2017
- No. of teams: 4
- Country: United States
- Venues: Capital One Arena, Washington, D.C.
- Most titles: Maryland (4)

The BB&T Classic, originally the Franklin National Bank Classic, was a Washington, D.C.–based college basketball event held annually from 1995 to 2017. It raised funds for the Children's Charities Foundation, a fund-raising organization that financially supports Washington, D.C.–area charities, and was staged on or around the first weekend in December. Its name changed in 1999 after BB&T acquired Franklin National Bank that year. Played as a tournament with championship and consolation games from 1995 to 2004, the BB&T Classic was a non-tournament showcase event from 2005 to 2017. A decreasing ability to attract marquee teams and declining fan interest and television coverage led to its demise after the 2017 edition.

== Founding ==
Former ambassador and vice-presidential press secretary Peter Teeley and Washington, D.C.-area sportswriter and author John Feinstein organized the Classic in 1995, hoping to raise US$500,000 for the Children's Charities Foundation in the Classic's first year. Abe Pollin, owner of USAir Arena in Landover, Maryland, agreed to host the Classic there, with an initial commitment of three years. In the late 1990s and early 2000s, the BB&T Classic was a legitimate tournament with national attention that attracted powerhouse teams.

== Venue ==
The BB&T Classic originally took place at USAir Arena, later known as USAirways Arena, in Landover, Maryland. After the MCI Center, later known as the Verizon Center and then as Capital One Arena, opened in downtown Washington, D.C., in 1997, the Classic moved there. The event remained there for the rest of its existence.

== Format ==
=== Tournament, 1995–2004 ===
Originally, the event lasted two days and featured four teams, highlighted by local mainstays Maryland and George Washington, accompanied by two nationally recognized programs. The first day consisted of a doubleheader pitting each of the local teams against one of the national teams. The following afternoon, a championship game was held between the two opening-round winners. A consolation game between the two teams who lost in the opening round also took place.

=== Showcase event, 2005–2017 ===
In 2005, the BB&T Classic's format was altered due to a declining ability to attract nationally renowned programs, partly because under National Collegiate Athletic Association (NCAA) rules participating teams had to give up two home games in their schedule in order to participate in the tournament. The Classic transformed in 2005 from a tournament into a tripleheader showcase played as a single-evening weeknight event. In 2008 and 2009, it was played as a doubleheader. It returned to the tripleheader format in 2010, but from 2011 through 2014 it was a doubleheader. In 2015, the format again changed, with the Classic consisting of a single game. In 2016 and 2017, the Classic returned to a doubleheader format.

== Television coverage ==
In its early years, the event was broadcast both nationally on ABC and locally on Washington, D.C.'s WDCA. After the Classic changed from a tournament to a showcase event, broadcast television interest in covering it waned, and coverage migrated to cable television. The 2005 and 2006 editions were shown on Comcast SportsNet Mid-Atlantic; in later years the Mid-Atlantic Sports Network (MASN) televised the BB&T Classic. In 2014, Fox Sports 1 and ESPN3 each carried one game. CBS Sports Network televised the lone game played in 2015. In both 2016 and 2017 Fox Sports 1 televised the Georgetown game, while CBS Sports Network carried the George Washington game in 2016 and MASN televised it in 2017.

== Demise ==
In 2006, the NCAA changed its scheduling rules, allowing colleges to play up to four games in an "exempt" tournament (an in-season tournament whose games counted as only one game in a team′s 27-game schedule) every season, rather than in only two "exempt" tournaments every four years. This made "exempt" tournaments far more popular for major college basketball programs and led to a proliferation of such tournaments. "Non-exempt" events like the BB&T Classic had difficulty attracting major teams in the new scheduling environment because participating schools not only had to give up a home game (and the revenue it generated) to take part in the Classic, but also could not play as many games overall as they could if they played in an exempt tournament. By 2011, with few marquee teams participating, attendance had dwindled dramatically at the Classic, raising doubts about its ability to survive.

The hope of Feinstein and others that the BB&T Classic would serve as showcase for competition among major Washington, D.C.-area college basketball programs was never realized, partly due to cool relations between the local teams and Feinstein's own public criticism of Georgetown for not taking part. The only area team other than George Washington and Maryland to take part in a BB&T Classic tournament was George Mason in 2004 (the tournament format's final year); after that, the Patriots made four showcase-event appearances between 2005 and 2013 before their participation came to and end. Navy made four showcase appearances, all between 2005 and 2010, while American played only in two showcase years and Howard in only one. The closest the BB&T Classic ever came to fulfilling Feinstein's vision of showcasing Washington-area teams was in 2005, the first showcase year, when an all-local lineup of American, George Mason, George Washington, Howard, Maryland, and Navy took part.

Interest in play by the tournament's two stalwarts, Maryland and George Washington, eventually waned. Maryland played in the first 19 BB&T Classic events, but made its last appearance in 2013 – Maryland head coach Mark Turgeon citing a lack of national television coverage, ever-shrinking crowds, and the loss of a home game as reasons for his team to end its relationship with the Classic – leaving George Washington as the only team to play in all 20 BB&T Classics through 2014. By 2014, Feinstein's association with the Classic had come to an end, and with him no longer involved relations between the Classic and Georgetown warmed; that year Georgetown made its first appearance, allowing the Classic to continue to field two major local teams, and the Hoyas took part in the final four editions of the BB&T Classic. However, George Washington did not participate in 2015, leaving Georgetown as the only local participant in what turned out to be a single-game version of the Classic that year. George Washington returned to the Classic in 2016 but then announced that 2017 was its final year of participation.

The final edition of the BB&T Classic took place on December 3, 2017, with a doubleheader in which George Washington defeated Temple and Georgetown beat Coppin State at Capital One Arena before a crowd of only 6,335 for the two games combined. The Classic was quietly discontinued, with little apparent notice of its demise by the press or fans. During its 23-season run, it raised over US$10 million for the Children's Charities Foundation.

== Yearly champions, runners-up, and MVPs ==
Year	Champion	Runner-up	Consolation Winner	4th Place	Tournament MVP
1995	UMass	Florida	Maryland	George Washington	Marcus Camby, UMass
1996	Maryland	George Washington	California	Mississippi State	Keith Booth, Maryland
1997	George Washington	Maryland	Kansas	Penn	Shawnta Rogers, George Washington
1998	Maryland	DePaul	Stanford	George Washington	Steve Francis, Maryland
1999	George Washington	Maryland	Illinois	Seton Hall	SirValiant Brown, George Washington
2000	Maryland	George Washington	St. John's	Michigan	SirValiant Brown, George Washington
2001	Maryland	Connecticut	George Washington	Princeton	Lonny Baxter, Maryland
2002	Notre Dame	Texas	Maryland	George Washington	T. J. Ford, Texas
2003	Gonzaga	George Washington	West Virginia	Maryland	Ronny Turiaf, Gonzaga
2004	George Washington	Maryland	Michigan State	George Mason	TJ Thompson, George Washington
Showcase Format
Date	Game One	Game Two	Game Three		
12/5/2005	Navy 82; Howard 73	George Mason 75; American 35	George Washington 78; Maryland 70		
12/3/2006	Bucknell 60; George Mason 57	George Washington 63; Virginia Tech 62	Notre Dame 81; Maryland 74		
12/2/2007	Auburn 74; George Washington 70	East Carolina 68; George Mason 65	VCU 85; Maryland 76		
12/7/2008	Virginia Tech 79; Navy 70	Maryland 76; George Washington 53	None		
12/6/2009	George Washington 81; Navy 69	Villanova 95; Maryland 86	None		
12/5/2010	Florida 67; American 48	Navy 64; George Washington 57	Temple 64; Maryland 61		
12/4/2011	Maryland 78; Notre Dame 71	VCU 75; George Washington 60	None		
12/2/2012	Maryland 69; George Mason 62	George Washington 67; Manhattan 55	None		
12/8/2013	Oklahoma 81; George Mason 66	George Washington 77; Maryland 75	None		
12/7/2014	Georgetown 78; Towson 46	George Washington 78; Charlotte 70	None		
12/12/2015	Georgetown 87; UNC Wilmington 82	None	None		
12/4/2016	Georgetown 77; Elon 74	Florida State 67; George Washington 48	None		
12/3/2017	George Washington 71; Temple 67	Georgetown 76; Coppin State 60	None		

=== Results by school ===
Team	Appearance Years	Tournament Record	Tournament Championships	Showcase Record	Overall Record
American	2005, 2010	—	—	0–2	0–2
Auburn	2007	—	—	1–0	1–0
Bucknell	2006	—	—	1–0	1–0
California	1996	1–1	none	—	1–1
Charlotte	2014	—	—	0–1	0–1
Connecticut	2001	1–1	none	—	1–1
Coppin State	2017	—	—	0–1	0–1
DePaul	1998	1–1	none	—	1–1
East Carolina	2007	—	–	1–0	1–0
Elon	2016	—	—	0–1	0–1
Florida	1995, 2010	1–1	none	1–0	2–1
Florida State	2016	—	—	1–0	1–0
George Mason	2004–2007, 2012, 2013	0–2	none	1–4	1–6
George Washington	1995–2014, 2016, 2017	10–10	1997, 1999, 2004	7–5	17–15
Georgetown	2014–2017	—	—	4–0	4–0
Gonzaga	2003	2–0	2003	—	2–0
Howard	2005	—	—	0–1	0–1
Illinois	1999	1–1	none	—	1–1
Kansas	1997	1–1	none	—	1–1
Manhattan	2012	—	—	0–1	0–1
Maryland	1995–2013	13–7	1996, 1998, 2000, 2001	3–6	16–13
Michigan	2000	0–2	—	—	0–2
Michigan State	2004	1–1	none	—	1–1
Mississippi State	1996	0–2	none	—	0–2
Navy	2005, 2008–2010	—	—	2–2	2–2
UNC Wilmington	2015	—	—	0–1	0–1
Notre Dame	2002, 2006, 2011	2–0	2002	1–1	3–1
Oklahoma	2013	—	—	1–0	1–0
Penn	1997	0–2	none	—	0–2
Princeton	2001	0–2	none	—	0–2
Seton Hall	1999	0–2	none	—	0–2
St. John's	2000	1–1	none	—	1–1
Stanford	1998	1–1	none	—	1–1
Temple	2010, 2017	—	—	1–1	1–1
Texas	2002	1–1	none	—	1–1
Towson	2014	—	—	0–1	0–1
UMass	1995	2–0	1995	—	2–0
VCU	2007, 2011	—	—	1–1	1–1
Villanova	2009	—	—	1–0	1–0
Virginia Tech	2006, 2008	—	—	1–1	1–1
West Virginia	2003	1–1	none	—	1–1

== Brackets ==
* – Denotes overtime period

=== 1995 ===
Semifinals; December 2
5	UMass	50
19	Maryland	47
Florida	75
George Washington	66

Championship; December 3
5	UMass	80
Florida	58
Third Place Game; December 3
19	Maryland	98
George Washington	81

=== 1996 ===
Semifinals; December 8
Maryland	80
California	64
George Washington	57
Mississippi State	36

Championship; December 9
Maryland	74
George Washington	68
Third Place Game; December 9
California	78
Mississippi State	45

=== 1997 ===
Semifinals; December 7
2	Kansas	83
23	Maryland	86
Penn	62
George Washington	66

Championship; December 8
23	Maryland	66
George Washington	70
Third Place Game; December 8
2	Kansas	89
Penn	71

=== 1998 ===
Semifinals; December 6
5	Stanford	60
2	Maryland	62
DePaul	87
George Washington	79

Championship; December 7
2	Maryland	92
DePaul	75
Third Place Game; December 7
5	Stanford	70
George Washington	56

=== 1999 ===
Semifinals; December 4
Seton Hall	63
George Washington	72
16	Illinois	67
Maryland	69

Championship; December 5
George Washington	74
Maryland	69
Third Place Game; December 5
Seton Hall	61
16	Illinois	72

=== 2000 ===
Semifinals; 12/2/1995
Michigan	51
13	Maryland	82
19	St. John's	75
George Washington	85

Championship; 12/3/1995
13	Maryland	71
George Washington	63
Third Place Game; 12/3/1995
Michigan	83
19	St. John's	97

=== 2001 ===
Semifinals; December 2
5	Connecticut	84
George Washington	76
Princeton	53
2	Maryland	61

Championship; December 3
Connecticut	65
2	Maryland	77
Third Place Game; December 3
George Washington	60
Princeton	57

=== 2002 ===
Semifinals; December 7
2	Texas	100
George Washington	92
Notre Dame	79
9	Maryland	67

Championship; December 8
2	Texas	92
Notre Dame	98
Third Place Game; December 8
George Washington	82
9	Maryland	93

=== 2003 ===
Semifinals; December 6
West Virginia	64
George Washington	70
17	Gonzaga	82
Maryland	68

Championship; December 7
George Washington	91
17	Gonzaga	96
Third Place Game; December 7
West Virginia	78
Maryland	77

=== 2004 ===
Semifinals; December 4
11	Michigan State	83
George Washington	96
George Mason	54
Maryland	78

Championship; December 5
George Washington	101
Maryland	92
Third Place Game; December 5
11	Michigan State	66
George Mason	60

=== 2005 ===
Showcase Format – No Tournament

December 5
Howard	73
Navy	82

December 5
American	35
George Mason	75

December 5
George Washington	78
Maryland	70

=== 2006 ===
Showcase Format – No Tournament

December 3
George Mason	57
Bucknell	60

December 3
George Washington	63
Virginia Tech	62

December 3
Maryland	74
Notre Dame	81

=== 2007 ===
Showcase Format – No Tournament

December 2
George Washington	70
Auburn	74

December 2
George Mason	65
East Carolina	68

December 2
Maryland	76
VCU	85

=== 2008 ===
Showcase Format – No Tournament

December 7
Navy	70
Virginia Tech	79

December 7
George Washington	53
Maryland	76

=== 2009 ===
Showcase Format – No Tournament

December 6
George Washington	81
Navy	69

December 6
Maryland 86	86
Villanova	95

=== 2010 ===
Showcase Format – No Tournament

December 5
American	48
Florida	67

December 5
George Washington	57
Navy	62

December 5
Maryland	61
Temple	64

=== 2011 ===
Showcase Format – No Tournament

December 4
Maryland	78
Notre Dame	71

December 4
VCU	75
George Washington	60

=== 2012 ===
Showcase Format – No Tournament

December 2
Maryland	69
George Mason	62

December 2
	George Washington	67
2	Manhattan	55

=== 2013 ===
Showcase Format – No Tournament

December 8
George Mason	66
Oklahoma	81

December 8
George Washington	77
Maryland 75	75

=== 2014 ===
Showcase Format – No Tournament

December 7
Georgetown	78
Towson	46

December 7
George Washington	78
Charlotte	70

=== 2015 ===
Showcase Format – No Tournament

December 12
Georgetown	87
UNC Wilmington	82

=== 2016 ===
Showcase Format – No Tournament

December 4
Georgetown	77
Elon	74

December 4
George Washington	48
Florida State	67

=== 2017 ===
Showcase Format – No Tournament

December 3
George Washington	67
Temple	61

December 3
Georgetown	76
Coppin State	60
