= 1996 Atlantic 10 men's basketball tournament =

- Classification: Division I
- Season: 1995–96
- Teams: 12
- Site: Philadelphia Civic Center; Philadelphia
- Champions: UMass (5th title)
- Winning coach: John Calipari (5th title)
- MVP: Carmelo Travieso (UMass)

1995–96 Atlantic 10 men's basketball standings
	Conf.				Overall
Team	W		L	PCT	W		L	PCT
East
No. 1 UMass †	15	–	1	.938	35	–	2	.946
Temple	12	–	4	.750	20	–	13	.606
Saint Joseph's	9	–	7	.563	19	–	13	.594
Rhode Island	8	–	8	.500	20	–	14	.588
St. Bonaventure	4	–	12	.250	10	–	18	.357
Fordham	2	–	14	.125	4	–	23	.148
West
No. 22 Virginia Tech	13	–	3	.813	23	–	6	.793
George Washington	13	–	3	.813	21	–	8	.724
Xavier	8	–	8	.500	13	–	15	.464
Dayton	6	–	10	.375	15	–	14	.517
Duquesne	3	–	13	.188	9	–	18	.333
La Salle	3	–	13	.188	6	–	24	.200
† 1996 Atlantic 10 Tournament winner Rankings from AP Poll

The 1996 Atlantic 10 men's basketball tournament was played from March 6 to March 9, 1996. The tournament was played at the Philadelphia Civic Center in Philadelphia, Pennsylvania. The winner was named champion of the Atlantic 10 Conference and received an automatic bid to the 1996 NCAA Men's Division I Basketball Tournament. The University of Massachusetts won the tournament for the fifth year in a row. Massachusetts eventually reached the semifinals of the NCAA tournament. George Washington, Temple, and Virginia Tech also received bids to the tournament. Carmelo Travieso of Massachusetts was named the tournament's Most Outstanding Player. Future NBA players Marcus Camby (Massachusetts), Marc Jackson (Temple), and Tyson Wheeler (Rhode Island) were among those also named to the All-Championship Team. The top two teams in each division received a first-round bye.

== Bracket ==
First round Wednesday, March 6
W4	Dayton	60
E5	St. Bonaventure	72
E3	Saint Joseph's	80
W6	Duquesne	72^{OT}
E4	Rhode Island	85
W5	La Salle	59
W3	Xavier	61
E6	Fordham	54

Quarterfinals; Thursday, March 7
E1	#2 UMass	69
E5	St. Bonaventure	56
W2	George Washington	81
E3	Saint Joseph's	71
W1	#15 Virginia Tech	71
E4	Rhode Island	77
E2	Temple	67
W3	Xavier	50

Semifinals; Friday, March 8
E1	#2 UMass	74
W2	George Washington	65
E4	Rhode Island	52
E2	Temple	64

Final; Saturday, March 9
E1	#2 UMass	75
E2	Temple	61

All games played at Philadelphia Civic Center, Philadelphia, Pennsylvania
