= SirValiant Brown =

American basketball player

Personal information
- Born: December 21, 1980 (age 45) Washington, D.C.
- Listed height: 6 ft 1 in (1.85 m)
- Listed weight: 175 lb (79 kg)

Career information
- High school: Robert E. Lee (Springfield, Virginia)
- College: George Washington (1999–2001)
- NBA draft: 2001: undrafted
- Playing career: 2001–2011
- Position: Point guard / shooting guard

Career history
- 2001: Irakleio
- 2001-2002: Aeroporti di Roma (Virtus Roma)
- 2002-2003: Roanoke dazzle
- 2003-2004: Club Trouville /San german atletico BSN
- 2004-2005: Dominican Republic Club Sameji W championship /
- 2005-2006: Dominican Republic Club Sameji W championship /Isabella Puerto Rico BSN
- 2006-2007: Butt daredevils / guayama puerto rico BSN
- 2007-2008: Iceland club hamar

Career highlights
- AP Honorable mention All-American (2000); Second-team All-Atlantic 10 (2000); Atlantic 10 Rookie of the Year (2000); Atlantic 10 All-Rookie Team (2000)

SirValiant Martin "Val" Brown (born December 21, 1980) is an American former professional basketball player. He played high school basketball at Robert E. Lee High School in Springfield, Virginia, and then signed for the George Washington Colonials in the NCAA Division I. During the 1999–2000 season, his freshman year, he was second in the nation in scoring with 24.6 points per game, behind Courtney Alexander of Fresno State, after leading the nation for part of the season. After his freshman year at George Washington, Brown was named Atlantic 10 Rookie of the Year and was an Honorable mention All-American. He left the college after his sophomore year in 2001 and declared for the NBA draft but went undrafted, and started his professional career in Italian league where he signed a huge contract 1 million dollars deal and he also played in NBA Development League. He has played in Italy, Greece, Iceland Uruguay, Puerto Rico, Canada and Germany throughout his 10-year career as a pro.

== High school career ==
Brown was born in Washington, D.C. to Robbie and Marcella Brown. His father named him after Prince Valiant, one of the knights of King Arthur's Round Table, and named his other son SirLancelot after Lancelot, another of the Arthurian legend knights. Brown was known as "Val" during his high school years at Robert E. Lee High School in Springfield, Virginia, and in his freshman year he was cited as one of the most impactful players of the varsity team by local newspaper Fairfax Connection. At the end of his sophomore year, Brown averaged 19.9 points per game and was named an Honorable mention All-Met selection by the Washington Post as one of the best players in the Washington, D.C. area. For his junior year, Brown initially transferred to Mount Zion Christian Academy in Durham, North Carolina, but left in December 1997 after a brief period and spent the rest of the year at Notre Dame Academy in Middleburg, Virginia.

In the summer of 1998 Brown was invited to the ABCD Camp, a camp for the best high school players in the United States. For his senior year Brown returned at Robert E. Lee, and averaged 27 points, 5 assists and 3 steals per game, was an All-State selection by the Associated Press and was an Honorable mention All-Met selection for the second time in his career.

== College career ==
=== Freshman season (1999–00) ===
Brown was recruited by Kentucky, UCLA and Xavier, among others; however, he had attracted the interest of Tom Penders after his assistant coach Rob Wright saw Brown play at Lee High School and started recruiting him since he was 15 years old. Brown himself cited his desire to play for Penders when he was coaching at Texas, and when Penders was hired by George Washington, Brown signed there in order to play for him.

Brown chose to wear jersey number 13 at George Washington; coach Penders was looking to replace Shawnta Rogers, a point guard who had won the Atlantic 10 Player of the Year award in his senior year, and granted Brown extensive playing time relying on him as the primary scoring option on the team. In his freshman year, Brown was a 6 ft 1 in (1.85 m), 158 pounds (72 kg) shooting guard who also played the point guard position sometimes.

Brown made his debut on November 19, 1999, scoring 19 points against Indiana State, followed by an 18-point performance against Oklahoma; on his third game with the Colonials, on November 21 against Houston, Brown scored 31 points. He had two back-to-back 33-point performances against South Florida (November 27) and Ohio (November 30). He was named the BB&T Classic MVP after scoring a total of 50 points over two games (23 against Seton Hall and 27 against Maryland). On December 11, 1999, Brown posted a new Charles E. Smith Center scoring record with a career-high 42 points against Siena. By the end of December, Brown had been nominated Atlantic 10 Conference Rookie of the Week 4 times in 4 consecutive weeks, and articles about him appeared on several news outlets such as The Washington Post, ESPN.com, The Orlando Sentinel and Dayton Daily News. Brown was leading all freshmen in scoring, and was one of the nation's top scorers in the NCAA Division I. Coach Penders described him as an Allen Iverson-like player. On January 29, 2000, he had a season-high 8 assists against La Salle, and on February 2 he scored 36 points against Duquesne. He then scored 33 against Dayton on February 9, 30 on February 19 against Rhode Island, 35 against UMass on February 29, and ended his season with a 33-point performance again in a game with UMass.

At the end of the season, Brown was the nation's leading scorer among freshmen, and the second best scorer overall with 24.6 points per game behind Courtney Alexander's 24.8. He led his team in several categories, including scoring, free throw percentage, three pointers made, and minutes per game. He averaged 22.8 points over 16 Atlantic 10 conference games, and was named the Atlantic 10 Rookie of the Year and was part of the All-Atlantic 10 Second Team and All-Rookie Team. Associated Press named him an Honorable mention All-American.

=== Sophomore season (2000–01) ===
Brown decided to come back to George Washington for his sophomore season. He opened the season with 11 points against Texas A&M on November 18, 2000, followed by 32 points against Old Dominion. On December 2 he scored 32 points against St. John's, which was ranked the #19 team in the nation. He was named BB&T Classic MVP for the second year in a row, and again scored a total of 50 points (32 against St. John's and 18 against Maryland) in the competition. The one against St. John's was his only 30-point game of the season: after a 28-point performance against Richmond on December 9, he never scored more than 24 for the rest of his sophomore year. On January 6, 2001, Brown reached the 1,000 career points milestone against UMass, after 44 games. He had 25 double-figures games in his season, and in 12 of them he scored at least 20 points. On February 17 he scored 23 points against Dayton, and he ended the season with 24 points against Temple on March 9. In his second year at George Washington Brown played 31 games (26 starts), playing 31.2 minutes per game and scoring a total of 536 points (17.3 per game), which ranked him second on his team behind Chris Monroe. At the end of the season, Brown was named to the NABC All-District 4 Second Team.

In May 2001, Brown declared for the 2001 NBA draft as an early entrant, thus ending his collegiate career. He scored a total 1,274 points at George Washington, which ranked 19th in program's history at the time, and his 738 points established a single-season record for the Colonials. He also ranked second all-time for career scoring average with 20.9 behind Joe Holup's 21.4.

=== College statistics ===
Year	Team	GP	GS	MPG	FG%	3P%	FT%	RPG	APG	SPG	BPG	PPG
1999–00	George Washington	30	28	36.8	.332	.264	.810	3.3	2.1	1.5	0.1	24.6
2000–01	George Washington	31	26	31.2	.369	.294	.719	2.7	1.8	1.5	0.2	17.3
Career		61	54	34.0	.348	.275	.772	3.0	2.0	1.5	0.2	20.9

== Professional career ==
Brown decided to forgo his final two years of college eligibility, and declared himself eligible for the 2001 NBA draft. At the 2001 NBA Draft Combine, Brown was measured at 5 ft 11 in (1.80 m) without shoes, weighing 176 pounds (80 kg), with a 6 ft 4 in (1.93 m) wingspan. During the Chicago pre-draft camp, Brown moved to the point guard position, after playing at shooting guard in college. During the draft, Brown was not selected by any of the NBA franchises. He then joined the Philadelphia 76ers for the 2001 Shaw's Pro Summer League in July. 76ers' coach Larry Brown did not give him much playing time, and decided not to play him for the final games of the tournament. After the summer league, Brown was not signed by the 76ers, and he joined the One World All-Stars, an exhibition team that toured the United States playing college teams.

In September 2002 Brown was allocated to the Roanoke Dazzle of the NBA Development League. He played 8 games during the 2002–03 National Basketball Development League season, averaging 3.5 points and 1.1 rebounds in 8.1 minutes of playing time; he shot 28.1% from the field (14.3% from three) and 66.7% from the free throw line. In September 2003, Brown signed with Trouville, a club of Montevideo in Uruguay which played in the Liga Uruguaya de Basketball. He stayed with the club until the early months of 2004. In November 2006, Brown was signed by the Quad City Riverhawks of the American Basketball Association. After playing for Gigantes de Carolina in Puerto Rico's Baloncesto Superior Nacional, Brown spent the 2007–08 season in the Continental Basketball Association, playing for the Butte Daredevils. In 12 games with the Daredevils, Brown averaged 4.8 points, 1.7 rebounds and 0.8 assists shooting 44.9% from the field (40% on three-pointers).

In November 2008 Brown joined Canadian team Halifax Rainmen of the Premier Basketball League; he was released in late January 2009 after averaging 7.1 points in 23 minutes per game over 7 league appearances. He then went back to Puerto Rico and played for Leones de Ponce, appearing in 2 games and averaging 1.5 points per game. He spent the 2010–11 season playing for MTV Wolfenbüttel in Germany.
