= 1995–96 UMass Minutemen basketball team =

American college basketball season

1995–96 UMass Minutemen men's basketball
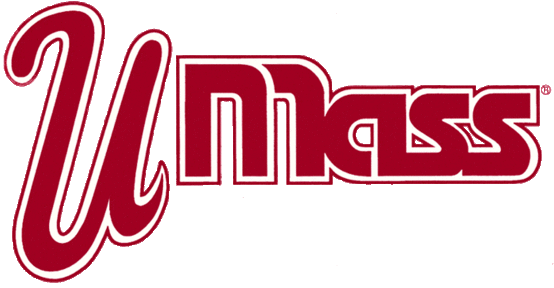

AP Poll regular season champions Atlantic 10 regular season champions Atlantic 10 tournament champions

NCAA tournament, Final Four (vacated)
- Conference: Atlantic 10 Conference

Ranking
- Coaches: No. 2
- AP: No. 1
- Record: 31–1 (4 wins, 1 loss vacated) (15–1 A-10)
- Head coach: John Calipari (8th season)
- Assistant coaches: Bruiser Flint; Ed Schilling; John Robic
- Home arena: William D. Mullins Memorial Center

1995–96 Atlantic 10 men's basketball standings
	Conf.				Overall
Team	W		L	PCT	W		L	PCT
East
No. 1 UMass †	15	–	1	.938	35	–	2	.946
Temple	12	–	4	.750	20	–	13	.606
Saint Joseph's	9	–	7	.563	19	–	13	.594
Rhode Island	8	–	8	.500	20	–	14	.588
St. Bonaventure	4	–	12	.250	10	–	18	.357
Fordham	2	–	14	.125	4	–	23	.148
West
No. 22 Virginia Tech	13	–	3	.813	23	–	6	.793
George Washington	13	–	3	.813	21	–	8	.724
Xavier	8	–	8	.500	13	–	15	.464
Dayton	6	–	10	.375	15	–	14	.517
Duquesne	3	–	13	.188	9	–	18	.333
La Salle	3	–	13	.188	6	–	24	.200
† 1996 Atlantic 10 Tournament winner Rankings from AP Poll

The 1995–96 UMass Minutemen basketball team represented the University of Massachusetts Amherst during the 1995–96 NCAA Division I men's basketball season. The Minutemen, led by eighth year head coach John Calipari, played their home games at William D. Mullins Memorial Center and were members of the Atlantic 10 Conference. They finished the season 35–2, 15–1 in A-10 play to finish in first place. The Minutemen won the A-10 Conference tournament by beating Temple in the finals. They were awarded a #1 seed in the NCAA tournament. The Minutemen advanced to the Final Four, losing to eventual National Champion Kentucky.

On May 8, 1997, the NCAA Executive Committee voted to negate the Minutemen's 1996 NCAA Tournament record, for Marcus Camby's acceptance of agents' improper gifts. The 35–2 record was reduced to 31–1, and the UMass slot in the Final Four is officially marked as "vacated." The Final Four trophy, banner, and 45% of tournament revenue were returned to the NCAA. Camby reimbursed the school for the $151,617 in lost revenue.

== Roster ==
1995–96 UMass Minutemen men's basketball team
Players
Coaches

Pos.	#	Name	Height	Weight	Year	Hometown
F	3	Dana Dingle	6 ft 7 in (2.01 m)	220 lb (100 kg)	Sr	Bronx, New York
F	4	Donta Bright	6 ft 6 in (1.98 m)	223 lb (101 kg)	Sr	Baltimore, Maryland
G	5	Charlton Clarke	6 ft 3 in (1.91 m)	210 lb (95 kg)	Fr	Bronx, New York
G	11	Giddiel Padilla	6 ft 3 in (1.91 m)	187 lb (85 kg)	Sr	Toa Alta, Puerto Rico
G	12	Edgar Padilla	6 ft 2 in (1.88 m)	175 lb (79 kg)	Jr	Springfield, Massachusetts
C	21	Marcus Camby	6 ft 11 in (2.11 m)	220 lb (100 kg)	Jr	Hartford, Connecticut
G	24	Carmelo Travieso	6 ft 2 in (1.88 m)	180 lb (82 kg)	Jr	Boston, Massachusetts
F	34	Tyrone Weeks	6 ft 7 in (2.01 m)	260 lb (118 kg)	Jr	Philadelphia, Pennsylvania
F/C	40	Ted Cottrell	6 ft 9 in (2.06 m)	200 lb (91 kg)	Sr	Annapolis, Maryland
F	44	Rigoberto Núñez	6 ft 7 in (2.01 m)	195 lb (88 kg)	Sr	Lawrence, Massachusetts
F	50	Inus Norville	6 ft 8 in (2.03 m)	225 lb (102 kg)	So	Fayetteville, North Carolina

Head coach

- John Calipari (Clarion)

Assistant coach(es)

- Bruiser Flint (Saint Joseph's)
- Ed Schilling (Miami (OH))
- John Robic (Denison)

Legend

- (C) Team captain
- (S) Suspended
- (I) Ineligible
- (W) Walk-on
- Injured
- Current redshirt

== Schedule ==
Date time, TV	Rank^{#}	Opponent^{#}	Result	Record	Site (attendance) city, state
Non-conference regular season
11/28/1995*	No. 5	vs. No. 1 Kentucky; Great 8	W 92–82	1–0	The Palace of Auburn Hills (15,454); Auburn Hills, Michigan
12/2/1995*	No. 5	vs. No. 19 Maryland; Franklin National Bank Classic	W 50–47	2–0	USAir Arena (16,302); Landover, Maryland
12/03/1995*	No. 5	vs. Florida; Franklin National Bank Classic	W 80–58	3–0	USAir Arena (16,358); Landover, Maryland
12/6/1995*	No. 3	No. 10 Wake Forest	W 60–46	4–0	Mullins Center (9,493); Amherst, Massachusetts
12/09/1995*	No. 3	vs. Boston College; Commonwealth Classic	W 65–57	5–0	FleetCenter (9,493); Boston, Massachusetts
12/12/1995*	No. 3	UNC Wilmington	W 77–51	6–0	Mullins Center (9,493); Amherst, Massachusetts
12/22/1995*	No. 2	vs. No. 21 Georgia Tech; Jimmy V Classic	W 75–67	7–0	Brendan Byrne Arena (13,452); East Rutherford, New Jersey
12/28/1995*	No. 1	vs. NC State; Rainbow Classic	W 78–67	8–0	Special Events Arena (8,871); Honolulu, Hawaii
12/29/1995*	No. 1	vs. USC; Rainbow Classic	W 78–63	9–0	Special Events Arena (7,856); Honolulu, Hawaii
12/30/1995*	No. 1	vs. No. 13 Syracuse; Rainbow Classic	W 65–47	10–0	Special Events Arena (8,530); Honolulu, Hawaii
1/04/1996*	No. 1	vs. No. 3 Memphis; Atlantic-10 / Conference USA Challenge	W 64–61	11–0	Worcester Centrum (13,557); Worcester, Massachusetts
Atlantic 10 regular season
1/06/1996	No. 1	Dayton	W 78–58	12–0 (1–0)	Mullins Center (9,493); Amherst, Massachusetts
01/10/1996	No. 1	at Saint Joseph's	W 94-89 ^{OT}	13-0 (2–0)	Alumni Memorial Fieldhouse (3,200); Philadelphia
01/14/1996	No. 1	at St. Bonaventure	W 65–52	14–0 (3–0)	Reilly Center (6,000); Olean, New York
01/17/1996	No. 1	Rhode Island	W 77–71	15–0 (4–0)	Mullins Center (9,493); Amherst, Massachusetts
01/20/1996	No. 1	at Duquesne	W 93–89	16–0 (5–0)	A. J. Palumbo Center (6,119); Pittsburgh, Pennsylvania
01/23/1996*	No. 1	at Pittsburgh	W 79–71 ^{OT}	17–0	Fitzgerald Field House (6,798); Pittsburgh, Pennsylvania
01/27/1996	No. 1	at St. Bonaventure	W 72–47	18–0 (6–0)	Mullins Center (9,493); Amherst, Massachusetts
01/30/1996	No. 1	at Fordham	W 80–50	19–0 (7–0)	Mullins Center (9,493); Amherst, Massachusetts
02/01/1996	No. 1	at Temple	W 59–35	20–0 (8–0)	McGonigle Hall (3,900); Philadelphia, Pennsylvania
02/04/1996	No. 1	at Xavier	W 78–74 ^{OT}	21–0 (9–0)	Cincinnati Gardens (10,118); Cincinnati, Ohio
02/06/1996	No. 1	at Fordham	W 73–47	22–0 (10–0)	Madison Square Garden (9,695); New York City, New York
02/11/1996	No. 1	Temple	W 84–55	23–0 (11–0)	Mullins Center (9,493); Amherst, Massachusetts
2/15/1996	No. 1	La Salle	W 70–53	24–0 (12–0)	Mullins Center (9,493); Amherst, Massachusetts
02/17/1996	No. 1	at Virginia Tech	W 74–68	25–0 (13–0)	Cassell Coliseum (10,052); Blacksburg, Virginia
02/20/1996	No. 1	at Rhode Island	W 74–69	26–0 (14–0)	Providence Civic Center (13,106); Providence, Rhode Island
02/24/1996	No. 1	George Washington	L 76–86	26–1 (14–1)	Mullins Center (9,493); Amherst, Massachusetts
02/28/1996	No. 2	at Saint Joseph's	W 68–66 ^{OT}	27–1 (15–1)	Mullins Center (9,493); Amherst, Massachusetts
03/02/1996*	No. 2	at No. 21 Louisville	W 62–59	28–1	Freedom Hall (20,076); Louisville, Kentucky
Atlantic 10 tournament
03/07/1996	No. 2	vs. St. Bonaventure; Quarterfinals	W 69–56	29–1	Philadelphia Civic Center (N/A); Philadelphia, Pennsylvania
03/08/1996	No. 2	vs. George Washington; Semifinals	W 74–65	30–1	Philadelphia Civic Center (N/A); Philadelphia, Pennsylvania
03/09/1996	No. 2	vs. Temple; Finals	W 75–61	31–1	Philadelphia Civic Center (8,727); Philadelphia, Pennsylvania
NCAA tournament
03/14/1996*	(1 E) No. 1	vs. (16 E) Central Florida; East Region First round	W 92–70	32–1*	Providence Civic Center (11,931); Providence, Rhode Island
03/16/1996*	(1 E) No. 1	vs. (9 E) Stanford; East Region Second Round	W 79–74	33–1*	Providence Civic Center (11,931); Providence, Rhode Island
03/21/1996*	(1 E) No. 1	vs. (12 E) Arkansas; East Regional semifinal	W 79–63	34–1*	Georgia Dome (34,614); Atlanta, Georgia
03/23/1996*	(1 E) No. 1	vs. (2 E) No. 4 Georgetown; East Regional final	W 86–62	35–1*	Georgia Dome (32,328); Atlanta, Georgia
03/30/1996*	(1 E) No. 1	vs. (1 MW) No. 2 Kentucky; National semifinal	L 74–81	35–2*	Brendan Byrne Arena (19,229); East Rutherford, New Jersey
*Non-conference game. ^{#}Rankings from AP Poll. (#) Tournament seedings in parentheses. E=East. All times are in Eastern Time.

== Rankings ==
Ranking movements Legend: ██ Increase in ranking ██ Decrease in ranking
	Week																		
Poll	Pre	1	2	3	4	5	6	7	8	9	10	11	12	13	14	15	16	17	Final
AP	7	7	5	3	3	2	1	1	1	1	1	1	1	1	1	2	2	1	Not released
Coaches	7	7	6	3	3	2	1	1	1	1	1	1	1	1	1	2	2	1	2

== Awards and honors ==
- Marcus Camby – National Player of the Year, Consensus First-team All-American, A-10 Player of the Year
- Edgar Padilla – Honorable Mention AP All-American
- John Calipari – Naismith College Coach of the Year, NABC Coach of the Year

== Team players in the 1996 NBA draft ==
Round	Pick	Player	NBA club
1	2	Marcus Camby	Toronto Raptors
