= Holly Hellmuth =

American soccer player (born 1971)

Personal information
- Full name: Holly Wiles
- Birth name: Holly Hellmuth
- Date of birth: March 19, 1971 (age 55)
- Place of birth: Fairfax Station, Virginia, U.S.
- Height: 5 ft 7 in (1.70 m)
- Position: Defender

Youth career
- –1989: Lee Lancers

College career
Years	Team	Apps	(Gls)
1989–1992	UMass Minutewomen	76	(15)

International career
1990	United States	1	(0)

Managerial career
- 2012–201?: FCV Ashburn Blast
- FC Virginia
- McLean Youth Soccer
- Loudoun Soccer
- 2017–: WA Spirit Academy VA (assistant)

Holly Wiles (née Hellmuth; born March 19, 1971) is an American former soccer player who played as a defender, making one appearance for the United States women's national team.

== Career ==
Hellmuth played for the Lee Lancers in high school, where she was a two-time NSCAA High School All-American. In college, she played for the UMass Minutewomen from 1989 to 1992, where she was a letter-winner. In total, she scored 15 goals and recorded 13 assists in 76 appearances for the Minutewomen. She was an NSCAA and Soccer America First-Team All-American in 1991 and 1992, and All-New England in 1989, 1990, and 1991. She was also a finalist for the Hermann Trophy.

Hellmuth made her only international appearance for the United States on July 27, 1990 in a friendly match against Canada. The match in Winnipeg finished as a 4–1 win for the U.S.

Hellmuth has coached various youth girls' soccer teams, including FCV Ashburn Blast, FC Virginia, McLean Youth Soccer, Loudoun Soccer, and as the assistant for Washington Spirit Academy VA since 2017.

== Career statistics ==
=== International ===
United States
Year	Apps	Goals
1990	1	0
Total	1	0
