= 1995–96 Marquette Golden Eagles men's basketball team =

American college basketball season

1995–96 Marquette Golden Eagles men's basketball

NCAA tournament, second round
- Conference: Conference USA
- Blue

Ranking
- Coaches: No. 23
- AP: No. 20
- Record: 23–8 (10-4 CUSA)
- Head coach: Mike Deane (2nd season)
- Home arena: Bradley Center

1995–96 Conference USA men's basketball standings
	Conf.				Overall
Team	W		L	PCT	W		L	PCT
Blue
No. 7 Cincinnati †	11	–	3	.786	28	–	5	.848
No. 20 Marquette	10	–	4	.714	23	–	8	.742
Saint Louis	4	–	10	.286	16	–	14	.533
DePaul	2	–	12	.143	11	–	18	.379
Red
Tulane	9	–	5	.643	22	–	10	.688
UAB	6	–	8	.429	16	–	14	.533
Southern Miss	6	–	8	.429	12	–	15	.444
South Florida	2	–	12	.143	12	–	16	.429
White
No. 16 Memphis	11	–	3	.786	22	–	8	.733
No. 24 Louisville	10	–	4	.714	22	–	12	.647
UNC Charlotte	6	–	8	.429	14	–	15	.483
† 1996 Conference USA Tournament winner Rankings from AP Poll

The 1995–96 Marquette Golden Eagles men's basketball team represented the Marquette University in the 1995–96 season. The Golden Eagles finished the regular season with a record of 23–8. As a 4 seed, the Golden Eagles defeated the 13 seed Monmouth in the first round, 68–44. Marquette would fall to Arkansas in the second round.

== Roster ==
1995–96 Marquette Golden Eagles men's basketball team
Players
Coaches

Pos.	#	Name	Height	Weight	Year	Hometown
F	40	Faisal Abraham	6 ft 7 in (2.01 m)	225 lb (102 kg)	Jr	St. Croix, Virgin Islands
F	5	Chris Crawford	6 ft 9 in (2.06 m)	215 lb (98 kg)	Jr	Kalamazoo, Michigan
G	13	Roney Eford	6 ft 6 in (1.98 m)	205 lb (93 kg)	Sr	Queens, New York
G	33	Mark Harris	6 ft 3 in (1.91 m)	210 lb (95 kg)	Sr	Milwaukee, Wisconsin
G	12	Aaron Hutchins	5 ft 10 in (1.78 m)	175 lb (79 kg)	So	Lima, Ohio
C	45	Jarrod Lovette	6 ft 10 in (2.08 m)	245 lb (111 kg)	Fr	Blair, Wisconsin
C	00	Amal McCaskill	6 ft 11 in (2.11 m)	220 lb (100 kg)	RS Sr	Maywood, Illinois
G	3	Anthony Pieper	6 ft 3 in (1.91 m)	185 lb (84 kg)	Jr	Wausaukee, Wisconsin

Head coach

- Mike Deane

Assistant coach(es)

Legend

- (C) Team captain
- (S) Suspended
- (I) Ineligible
- (W) Walk-on
- Injured
- Current redshirt

== Schedule ==
Date time, TV	Rank^{#}	Opponent^{#}	Result	Record	Site city, state
November 26*		UW Milwaukee	W 91–74	1–0	Bradley Center; Milwaukee, WI
December 1*		Columbia	W 72–45	2–0	Bradley Center; Milwaukee, WI
December 2*		UW Green Bay	W 64–44	3–0	Bradley Center; Milwaukee, WI
December 6*		Coppin State	W 95–69	4–0	Bradley Center; Milwaukee, WI
December 9*		vs. La Salle	L 65–68	4–1	Boardwalk Hall; Atlantic City, NJ
December 16*		No. 22 Santa Clara	W 78–49	5–1	Bradley Center; Milwaukee, WI
December 22*		Vermont	W 89–58	6–1	Bradley Center; Milwaukee, WI
December 31*		at Wisconsin	L 46–55	6–2	Wisconsin Field House; Madison, WI
January 2*		Morgan State	W 98–58	7–2	Bradley Center; Milwaukee, WI
January 7		Saint Louis	W 69–47	8–2 (1–0)	Bradley Center; Milwaukee, WI
January 10*		Iowa State	W 58–56	9–2 (1–0)	Bradley Center; Milwaukee, WI
January 13		at No. 4 Cincinnati	L 70–91	9–3 (1–1)	Fifth Third Arena; Cincinnati, Ohio
January 15*		Illinois-Chicago	W 103–81	10–3 (1–1)	Bradley Center; Milwaukee, WI
January 17		at DePaul	W 73–60	11–3 (2–1)	Allstate Arena; Rosemont, Illinois
January 20		No. 9 Memphis	W 59–55	12–3 (3–1)	Bradley Center; Milwaukee, WI
January 25		at Charlotte	L 69–79	12–4 (3–2)	Charlotte Coliseum; Charlotte, NC
January 30		UAB	W 73–64	13–4 (4–2)	Bradley Center; Milwaukee, WI
February 4		at Tulane	L 74–75	13–5 (4–3)	Avron B. Fogelman Arena; New Orleans, Louisiana
February 7		South Florida	W 82–61	14–5 (5–3)	Bradley Center; Milwaukee, WI
February 11		DePaul	W 75–65	15–5 (6–3)	Bradley Center; Milwaukee, WI
February 14*		Creighton	W 63–57	16–5 (6–3)	Omaha Civic Auditorium; Omaha, Nebraska
February 18		Southern Mississippi	W 58–55	17–5 (7–3)	Reed Green Coliseum; Hattiesburg, Mississippi
February 22		Charlotte	W 78–68	18–5 (8–3)	Bradley Center; Milwaukee, WI
February 25		at Saint Louis	L 58–69	18–6 (8–4)	Scottrade Center; St. Louis, Missouri
February 28		at Louisville	W 80–79	19–6 (9–4)	Freedom Hall; Louisville, Kentucky
March 2		at Cincinnati	W 74–72	20–6 (10–4)	Bradley Center; Milwaukee, WI
Conference USA tournament
March 7	No. 21	vs. South Florida; Conference USA Conference tournament	W 65–56	21–6 (11–4)	The Pyramid
March 8	No. 21	at No. 14 Memphis; Conference USA Conference tournament	W 72–60	22–6 (12–4)	The Pyramid
March 9	No. 21	vs. Cincinnati; Conference USA Conference tournament	L 84–85 ^{OT}	22–7 (12–5)	The Pyramid
NCAA tournament
March 14*	No. 20	vs. Monmouth; First Round	W 68–44	23–7 (12–5)	Dunkin' Donuts Center; Providence, RI
March 16*	No. 20	vs. Arkansas; Second Round	L 56–65	23–8 (12–5)	Dunkin' Donuts Center; Providence, RI
*Non-conference game. ^{#}Rankings from AP Poll. (#) Tournament seedings in parentheses.

== Team players drafted into the NBA ==
Round	Pick	Player	NBA club
2	49	Amal McCaskill	Orlando Magic
