= 1996 Conference USA men's basketball tournament =

College basketball tournament

- Classification: Division I
- Season: 1995–96
- Teams: 11
- Site: The Pyramid; Memphis, Tennessee
- Champions: Cincinnati (1st title)
- Winning coach: Bob Huggins (1st title)
- MVP: Danny Fortson (Cincinnati)

1995–96 Conference USA men's basketball standings
	Conf.				Overall
Team	W		L	PCT	W		L	PCT
Blue
No. 7 Cincinnati †	11	–	3	.786	28	–	5	.848
No. 20 Marquette	10	–	4	.714	23	–	8	.742
Saint Louis	4	–	10	.286	16	–	14	.533
DePaul	2	–	12	.143	11	–	18	.379
Red
Tulane	9	–	5	.643	22	–	10	.688
UAB	6	–	8	.429	16	–	14	.533
Southern Miss	6	–	8	.429	12	–	15	.444
South Florida	2	–	12	.143	12	–	16	.429
White
No. 16 Memphis	11	–	3	.786	22	–	8	.733
No. 24 Louisville	10	–	4	.714	22	–	12	.647
UNC Charlotte	6	–	8	.429	14	–	15	.483
† 1996 Conference USA Tournament winner Rankings from AP Poll

The 1996 Conference USA men's basketball tournament was held March 6–9 at The Pyramid in Memphis, Tennessee. This was the first edition of the tournament.

Top-seeded Cincinnati defeated Marquette in the inaugural championship game, 85–84, to clinch their first Conference USA men's tournament championship.

The Bearcats, in turn, received an automatic bid to the 1996 NCAA tournament. They were joined in the tournament by fellow C-USA members Louisville, Marquette, and Memphis, who all earned at-large bids.

== Format ==
Conference USA was formed in 1995 by eleven former members the Metro Conference and the Great Midwest Conference (Dayton, VCU, and Virginia Tech were excluded). The conference's twelfth member, Houston, was to join for the 1996–97 season. For scheduling purposes, the eleven teams were placed into one of three three- or four-team divisions (Red, White, and Blue).

All eleven teams participated in the tournament and were seeded based on their regular season conference records, regardless of division. The top five teams were given byes into the quarterfinal round, and the bottom six teams were entered into the preliminary first round.

== Bracket ==
First round Wednesday, March 6
9	Saint Louis	61
8	Southern Miss	44
11	South Florida	73
6	UAB	57
7	UNC Charlotte	60
10	DePaul	66

Quarterfinals; Thursday, March 7
1	#8 Cincinnati	62
9	Saint Louis	59
5	Tulane	79
4	#22 Louisville	98
3	#21 Marquette	65
11	South Florida	56
10	DePaul	69
2	#14 Memphis	92

Semifinals; Friday, March 8
1	#8 Cincinnati	92
4	#22 Louisville	81
3	#21 Marquette	72
2	#14 Memphis	60

Championship; Saturday, March 9
1	#8 Cincinnati	85
3	#21 Marquette	84
