= John R. Lewis High School =

High school in Springfield, Virginia, United States

Location
- 6540 Franconia Road; Springfield, Virginia 22150; United States; 38°46′50″N 77°10′12″W

Information
- School type: Public, high school
- Founded: 1958; 68 years ago
- School district: Fairfax County Public Schools
- Principal: Alfonso Smith
- Teaching staff: 121.27 (FTE) (2016–17)
- Grades: 9–12
- Gender: coeducational
- Enrollment: 1,673 (2023–24)
- Student to teacher ratio: 13.80∶1 (2023–24)
- Language: English
- Campus: Suburban
- Colors: Blue; Gold
- Athletics conference: National District; Northern Region
- Team name: Lancers
- Rivals: West Springfield, Thomas Edison, Alexandria City High School
- Feeder schools: Francis Scott Key Middle School, Mark Twain Middle School
- Website: lewishs.fcps.edu
- Last updated: December 10, 2025; 8 months ago

John R. Lewis High School is a public high school in Springfield, Virginia. It is a part of Fairfax County Public Schools (FCPS) and opened in 1958. The school was originally named Robert E. Lee High School (Lee High School) after Robert E. Lee, the Confederate general, but starting at the beginning of the 2020–2021 school year it was renamed John R. Lewis High School after John Lewis, the recently deceased politician and civil rights leader. The school name changes began shortly after the vote was announced. Lewis High School athletic teams are known as the Lancers. The school slogan is "All Means All".

== History ==
The school opened in 1958 during a period of strong opposition to racial integration in Virginia's public schools. Fairfax County, along with many Southern jurisdictions, was under de jure segregation at the time. In response to the 1954 Brown v. Board of Education decision, the state—not localities—retained control of integration policy through the so-called Stanley Plan.

At a time when Fairfax County was still enforcing school segregation, the school board named new high schools after Confederate figures, reflecting the political climate. According to author Tom Gjelten, the county "defiantly named their next two high schools after Confederate army generals—J.E.B. Stuart and Robert E. Lee."

The site chosen for the new school was located on Franconia Road, near the border between Springfield and Franconia, across from what is now Springfield Town Center. Originally referred to as Franconia High School in planning documents, the school board debated the name over multiple meetings. On February 4, 1958, the Upper Pohick Community League submitted a letter proposing that schools be named after prominent Virginians, citing examples like "Fitzhugh" or "Lee."

Fitzhugh Lee, a Confederate general and nephew of Robert E. Lee, was considered due to his ties to the nearby Clermont estate.

At a May 6, 1958 meeting, School Board member Mr. Solomon proposed naming future high schools after deceased Americans of note, but exempted "Franconia H.S." from the motion. Mr. Woodson opposed dividing the community, stating, "I don't want the children coming to this school saying I'm from Springfield... I'm from Franconia... let's fight."

Ultimately, the board selected "Robert E. Lee High School" as a compromise, since the communities involved were in the Lee District. The same year, the board named several other schools, including Stuart and James Madison high schools on October 7, 1958, followed by Thomas Edison and George C. Marshall in 1960, and Thomas Jefferson in 1962.

The original name remained for more than 60 years. However, in the wake of national movements to remove Confederate symbols, two African-American students at the school launched a campaign to rename it. On June 23, 2020, the Fairfax County School Board voted unanimously to change the name.

On July 23, 2020, the school board announced that the school would be renamed John R. Lewis High School, in honor of the late congressman and civil rights icon. The name officially went into effect for the 2020–2021 school year.

== Demographics ==
As of the 2023–2024 academic year, John R. Lewis High School had an enrollment of 1,675 students. The racial and ethnic composition of the student body was as follows:

- Hispanic: 906 students (54.1%)
- Asian: 346 students (20.7%)
- White: 199 students (11.9%)
- Black or African American: 180 students (10.7%)
- Two or more races: 36 students (2.1%)
- American Indian or Alaska Native: 5 students (0.3%)
- Native Hawaiian or Other Pacific Islander: 3 students (0.2%)

The school also serves a diverse population with significant representation of English learners and economically disadvantaged students. In the 2023–2024 school year:

- English learners: 655 students (39.1%)
- Economically disadvantaged students: 1,224 students (73.1%)

== Administration ==
Lewis High School has served the Springfield community since it opened in 1958. Like many schools in Fairfax County, Lewis reflects the increasing diversity of its student body. Student families have origins in 42 countries (mostly Latin American) and speak more than 34 languages.

Deirdre Lavery was principal from 2014 to 2019. Alfonso Smith was appointed as principal in January 2020.

=== Career Center ===
Lewis High School has a College and Career Center inside the school. It is currently run by Steven Williams. Its goal is to provide students with college planning services through the use of computer software, videos, catalogs, and visits by college representatives from state and national colleges and universities. Career planning, military options, scholarship, and financial aid information are also available. Throughout the year, many special programs are presented for both parents and students.

== International Baccalaureate program ==
John R. Lewis High School offers the International Baccalaureate (IB) Diploma Programme (DP) as part of its Advanced Academics curriculum. The IB DP is a two-year educational program for students in grades 11 and 12, recognized internationally for its rigorous academic and personal development focus.

The IB Diploma Programme at Lewis High School encompasses six subject groups:

- Studies in Language and Literature
- Language Acquisition
- Individuals and Societies
- Sciences
- Mathematics
- The Arts

In addition to these subjects, students complete three core components:

- Theory of Knowledge (TOK)
- Extended Essay (EE)
- Creativity, Activity, Service (CAS)

For more detailed information about the IB Diploma Programme at John R. Lewis High School, including course offerings and requirements, please refer to the school’s official IB program page.

== Student activities ==
=== Honor societies ===
Students are selected for membership through an application process and sometimes interviews are conducted. Candidates must meet the chapter's requirement for scholarship, service, leadership, and character in order to be selected for membership. Continued participation in service projects is required to retain membership. Members must also maintain the chapter's required cumulative GPA and have a good understanding of the language, or specialty.

- Art Honor Society
- Math Honor Society (Mu Alpha Theta)
- Business Honor Society
- History Honor Society
- Music Honor Society (Tri-M)
- French Honor Society
- National Honor Society
- Science Honor Society

- German Honor Society
- Quill & Scroll Honor Society (Publications)
- Japanese Honor Society
- Spanish Honor Society
- Thespian Honor Society (Theater)
- History Honor Society
- English Honor Society

=== Publications ===
The Lance is Lewis High School's monthly newspaper. A student-run newspaper with a staff of approximately 20, The Lance covers news and events in the school, community, and nation.

=== Marching band ===
The marching band includes members from the top two bands, Wind Ensemble and Symphonic Band, and are directed by Kelly May McGee.

In the 2006 year, The Lewis Marching Lancers achieved a superior rating at the VBODA state marching festival, in Winchester, and later received the title of a "Virginia Honor Band."

On June 5, 2023, the Marching Lancers performed for Vice President Kamala Harris during a school safety event hosted at Lewis High School, performing the school's fight song before the event, and Happy after her speech was complete.

== Sports ==
John R. Lewis High School offers a comprehensive athletics program, competing in the Virginia High School League (VHSL) as a member of the National District. The school's teams, known as the Lancers, participate in various sports at the freshman, junior varsity, and varsity levels.

=== Football ===
The Lancers' football team competes in the National District of the VHSL.

=== Track and Field ===
The track and field program at Lewis High School has a history of producing All-District, All-Region, All-State, and All-American athletes. In 2007, the team secured third place in the AAA Virginia State meet.

Notable alumni include Terry Cobb (Class of 1966) and Sean Holston (Class of 2007), both of whom continued their track and field careers at the collegiate level.

=== Basketball ===
The girls' varsity basketball team achieved significant success during the 2007–2008 season, winning the Northern Region title.

The boys' basketball program boasts alumnus SirValiant Brown, who, after graduating in 1999, played for George Washington University. During his freshman year, he averaged 24.6 points per game, ranking second in the nation.

=== Soccer ===
In the 2023 season, the Lancers reached the Virginia Class 6 state championship game, finishing as state runners-up. This accomplishment was highlighted by the performance of midfielder Moad Ezzahir, who earned First-Team All-District and All-Region honors. Ezzahir went on to continue his soccer career at American University.

== Notable alumni ==
- Anne Abernathy, Class of 1971 – "Grandma Luge" has made six appearances in the Winter Olympics and in 2016 Summer Olympics for archery; listed in Guinness Book of Records as first woman over age 50 to compete in the Winter Olympics.
- Sarah Baker – actress best known for roles in movies such as The Campaign and Mascots and TV shows like Louie and Go On.
- Melissa Belote – triple gold medalist in 1972 Summer Olympics in swimming.
- SirValiant Brown – professional basketball player
- Darren "Venus Brown" Floyd (graduated 1987) – A&R / executive producer of will.i.am, The Black Eyed Peas, Justin Timberlake, Fergie, Macy Gray.
- Suzanne Marie Collins - murder victim
- Bill Courtney, Class of 1988 - Bucknell University basketball player, College basketball coach
- Meghan Cox (2013), former professional soccer player
- John Engelberger, Class of 1995 – defensive end for Virginia Tech, San Francisco 49ers and Denver Broncos.
- Sabrina Harman (graduated 1996) – U.S. Army reservist convicted in connection with the 2003–2004 Abu Ghraib prisoner abuse scandal in Baghdad, Iraq.
- Holly Hellmuth (1989) - former soccer player, made one appearance for the United States women's national team.
- Christina Tosi, Class of 1999 – chef, author, and television personality on MasterChef.
- Justin Wilson, Class of 1997 – politician
