= 1995–96 Temple Owls men's basketball team =

American college basketball season

1995–96 Temple Owls men's basketball

NCAA tournament, Second round
- Conference: Atlantic 10 Conference
- Record: 20–13 (12–4 A–10)
- Head coach: John Chaney (14th season)
- Home arena: McGonigle Hall

1995–96 Atlantic 10 men's basketball standings
	Conf.				Overall
Team	W		L	PCT	W		L	PCT
East
No. 1 UMass †	15	–	1	.938	35	–	2	.946
Temple	12	–	4	.750	20	–	13	.606
Saint Joseph's	9	–	7	.563	19	–	13	.594
Rhode Island	8	–	8	.500	20	–	14	.588
St. Bonaventure	4	–	12	.250	10	–	18	.357
Fordham	2	–	14	.125	4	–	23	.148
West
No. 22 Virginia Tech	13	–	3	.813	23	–	6	.793
George Washington	13	–	3	.813	21	–	8	.724
Xavier	8	–	8	.500	13	–	15	.464
Dayton	6	–	10	.375	15	–	14	.517
Duquesne	3	–	13	.188	9	–	18	.333
La Salle	3	–	13	.188	6	–	24	.200
† 1996 Atlantic 10 Tournament winner Rankings from AP Poll

The 1995–96 Temple Owls men's basketball team represented Temple University as a member of the Atlantic 10 Conference during the 1995–96 NCAA Division I men's basketball season. The team was led by head coach John Chaney and played their home games at McGonigle Hall. The Owls played a rugged non-conference schedule that included matchups with four AP Top 5 teams in their first eight games. The team finished second in the A-10 regular season standings and received an at-large bid to the NCAA tournament as No. 7 seed in the Southeast region. Temple beat Oklahoma in the opening round before losing to No. 2 seed Cincinnati, 78–65, in the round of 32. Temple finished with a record of 20–13 (12–4 A-10).

== Roster ==
1995–96 Temple Owls men's basketball team
Players
Coaches

Pos.	#	Name	Height	Weight	Year	Hometown
F/C	25	Marc Jackson	6 ft 10 in (2.08 m)	260 lb (118 kg)	So	Philadelphia, Pennsylvania
C	33	William Cunningham	6 ft 11 in (2.11 m)	250 lb (113 kg)	Sr	Augusta, Georgia
F		Damien Read	6 ft 6 in (1.98 m)	—

Head coach

- John Chaney

Assistant coach(es)

Legend

- (C) Team captain
- (S) Suspended
- (I) Ineligible
- (W) Walk-on
- Injured
- Current redshirt

Roster

== Schedule and results ==
Date time, TV	Rank^{#}	Opponent^{#}	Result	Record	Site city, state
Regular Season
Nov 16, 1995*		Rider; Preseason NIT	W 65–62	1–0	McGonigle Hall; Philadelphia, Pennsylvania
Nov 17, 1995*		at No. 5 Georgetown; Preseason NIT	L 49–74	1–1	Capital Centre; Washington, D.C.
Dec 2, 1995*		at Wisconsin	L 54–57 ^{OT}	1–2	Wisconsin Field House; Madison, Wisconsin
Dec 9, 1995*		Tulsa	L 60–64	1–3	McGonigle Hall; Philadelphia, Pennsylvania
Dec 13, 1995*		vs. No. 2 Villanova	W 62–56	2–3	
Dec 16, 1995*		vs. No. 12 Cincinnati	L 49–70	2–4	Gund Arena; Cleveland, Ohio
Dec 22, 1995*		vs. No. 1 Kansas	W 74–66 ^{OT}	3–4	Brendan Byrne Arena; East Rutherford, New Jersey
Dec 28, 1995*		at No. 3 Memphis	L 58–68	3–5	The Pyramid; Memphis, Tennessee
Dec 30, 1995*		vs. Oklahoma State	L 41–49	3–6	Tulsa Convention Center; Tulsa, Oklahoma
Feb 20, 1996*		at Penn	W 53–42	14–11	Palestra; Philadelphia, Pennsylvania
Atlantic 10 Tournament
Mar 7, 1996*		Xavier; Quarterfinals	W 67–50	18–11	Convention Hall; Philadelphia, Pennsylvania
Mar 8, 1996*		Rhode Island; Semifinals	W 64–52	19–11	Convention Hall; Philadelphia, Pennsylvania
Mar 9, 1996*		No. 2 UMass; Championship game	L 61–75	19–12	Convention Hall; Philadelphia, Pennsylvania
NCAA Tournament
Mar 15, 1996*	(7 SE)	vs. (10 SE) Oklahoma; First round	W 61–43	20–12	Orlando Arena; Orlando, Florida
Mar 17, 1996*	(7 SE)	vs. (2 SE) No. 7 Cincinnati; Second round	L 65–78	20–13	Orlando Arena; Orlando, Florida
*Non-conference game. ^{#}Rankings from AP Poll. (#) Tournament seedings in parentheses. SE=Southeast. All times are in Eastern Standard Time.
