= 1995–96 Memphis Tigers men's basketball team =

American college basketball season

1995–96 Memphis Tigers men's basketball

Conference USA regular season co-champion

NCAA tournament, First Round
- Conference: Conference USA
- White

Ranking
- AP: No. 16
- Record: 22–8 (11–3 C-USA)
- Head coach: Larry Finch (10th season)
- Home arena: Pyramid Arena

1995–96 Conference USA men's basketball standings
	Conf.				Overall
Team	W		L	PCT	W		L	PCT
Blue
No. 7 Cincinnati †	11	–	3	.786	28	–	5	.848
No. 20 Marquette	10	–	4	.714	23	–	8	.742
Saint Louis	4	–	10	.286	16	–	14	.533
DePaul	2	–	12	.143	11	–	18	.379
Red
Tulane	9	–	5	.643	22	–	10	.688
UAB	6	–	8	.429	16	–	14	.533
Southern Miss	6	–	8	.429	12	–	15	.444
South Florida	2	–	12	.143	12	–	16	.429
White
No. 16 Memphis	11	–	3	.786	22	–	8	.733
No. 24 Louisville	10	–	4	.714	22	–	12	.647
UNC Charlotte	6	–	8	.429	14	–	15	.483
† 1996 Conference USA Tournament winner Rankings from AP Poll

The 1995–96 Memphis Tigers men's basketball team represented Memphis State University as a member of the Great Midwest Conference during the 1995–96 NCAA Division I men's basketball season. The Tigers were led by head coach Larry Finch and played their home games at the Pyramid Arena in Memphis, Tennessee.

The Tigers tied for the regular season conference title, but lost in the semifinals of the conference tournament. Despite the loss, Memphis received an at-large bid to the 1996 NCAA tournament as No. 5 seed in the West region. The Tigers were upset by No. 12 seed Drexel in the opening round. The team finished with a 22–8 record (11–3 Conference USA).

== Roster ==
1995–96 Memphis State Tigers men's basketball team
Players
Coaches

Pos.	#	Name	Height	Weight	Year	Previous school	Hometown
G	00	Chris Garner	5 ft 10 in (1.78 m)	155 lb (70 kg)	Jr	Treadwell	Memphis, Tennessee
F	45	Cedric Henderson	6 ft 7 in (2.01 m)	—	Jr
C	55	Lorenzen Wright	6 ft 11 in (2.11 m)	245 lb (111 kg)	So	Booker T. Washington	Memphis, Tennessee

Head coach

- Larry Finch (Memphis)

Assistant coach(es)

Legend

- (C) Team captain
- (S) Suspended
- (I) Ineligible
- (W) Walk-on
- Injured
- Current redshirt

Roster

== Schedule and results ==
Date time, TV	Rank^{#}	Opponent^{#}	Result	Record	Site city, state
Regular season
Nov 25, 1995*	No. 12	vs. No. 24 Purdue; BCA Classic	W 91–76	1–0	Kemper Arena; Kansas City, Missouri
Nov 28, 1995*	No. 7	Jackson State	W 90–67	2–0	Pyramid Arena; Memphis, Tennessee
Dec 2, 1995*	No. 7	Florida A&M	W 80–50	3–0	Pyramid Arena; Memphis, Tennessee
Dec 5, 1995*	No. 7	Georgia State	W 89–69	4–0	Pyramid Arena; Memphis, Tennessee
Dec 16, 1995*	No. 6	Tennessee	W 57–55	5–0	Pyramid Arena; Memphis, Tennessee
Dec 21, 1995*	No. 5	Sam Houston State	W 74–51	6–0	Pyramid Arena; Memphis, Tennessee
Dec 23, 1995*	No. 5	Louisiana-Monroe	W 96–76	7–0	Pyramid Arena; Memphis, Tennessee
Dec 28, 1995*	No. 3	Temple	W 68–58	8–0	Pyramid Arena; Memphis, Tennessee
Jan 4, 1996*	No. 3	vs. No. 1 UMass; Atlantic-10 / Conference USA Challenge	L 61–64	8–1	Worcester Centrum; Worcester, Massachusetts
Jan 6, 1996*	No. 3	at Houston	L 67–69	8–2	Hofheinz Pavilion; Houston, Texas
Jan 8, 1996	No. 9	Charlotte	W 57–55	9–2 (1–0)	Pyramid Arena; Memphis, Tennessee
Jan 11, 1996	No. 9	DePaul	W 74–55	10–2 (2–0)	Pyramid Arena; Memphis, Tennessee
Jan 14, 1996*	No. 9	at South Florida	W 60–59 ^{OT}	11–2 (3–0)	Sun Dome; Tampa, Florida
Jan 18, 1996*	No. 9	Arkansas	W 94–72	12–2	Pyramid Arena; Memphis, Tennessee
Jan 20, 1996	No. 9	at Marquette	L 55–59	12–3 (3–1)	Bradley Center; Milwaukee, Wisconsin
Jan 24, 1996	No. 12	UAB	W 86–77	13–3 (4–1)	Pyramid Arena; Memphis, Tennessee
Jan 27, 1996	No. 12	at Southern Miss	W 81–68	14–3 (5–1)	Reed Green Coliseum; Hattiesburg, Mississippi
Jan 30, 1996	No. 11	Saint Louis	W 80–63	15–3 (6–1)	Pyramid Arena; Memphis, Tennessee
Feb 1, 1996	No. 11	at DePaul	W 83–82 ^{OT}	16–3 (7–1)	Rosemont Horizon; Rosemont, Illinois
Feb 3, 1996	No. 11	at Louisville	L 56–74	16–4 (7–2)	Freedom Hall; Louisville, Kentucky
Feb 8, 1996	No. 15	at Charlotte	W 68–55	17–4 (8–2)	Dale F. Halton Arena; Charlotte, North Carolina
Feb 17, 1996*	No. 15	at No. 14 Georgetown	L 60–81	17–5	USAir Arena (17,529); Landover, Maryland
Feb 20, 1996	No. 15	Southern Miss	W 91–66	18–5 (9–2)	Pyramid Arena; Memphis, Tennessee
Feb 22, 1996*	No. 19	at Chattanooga	W 63–55	19–5	McKenzie Arena; Chattanooga, Tennessee
Feb 25, 1996	No. 19	No. 21 Louisville	W 57–54	20–5 (10–2)	Pyramid Arena; Memphis, Tennessee
Feb 29, 1996	No. 14	at No. 7 Cincinnati	L 66–71	20–6 (10–3)	Fifth Third Arena; Cincinnati, Ohio
Mar 2, 1996	No. 14	Tulane	W 86–75	21–6 (11–3)	Pyramid Arena; Memphis, Tennessee
Conference USA Tournament
Mar 7, 1996*	No. 14	DePaul; Quarterfinals	W 92–69	22–6	Pyramid Arena; Memphis, Tennessee
Mar 8, 1996*	No. 14	No. 21 Marquette; Semifinals	L 60–72	22–7	Pyramid Arena; Memphis, Tennessee
NCAA Tournament
Mar 14, 1996*	(5 W) No. 16	vs. (12 W) Drexel; First Round	L 63–75	22–8	The Pit; Albuquerque, New Mexico
*Non-conference game. ^{#}Rankings from AP Poll. (#) Tournament seedings in parentheses. MW=Midwest. All times are in Eastern Time.

== Rankings ==
Ranking movements Legend: ██ Increase in ranking ██ Decrease in ranking — = Not ranked
	Week																		
Poll	Pre	1	2	3	4	5	6	7	8	9	10	11	12	13	14	15	16	17	Final
AP	13	12	7	7	6	5	3	3	9	9	12	11	15	15	19	14	14	16	Not released
Coaches	13	15	10	9	8	8	7	5	13	10	15	13	16	14	18	15	14	17	—
