= 1995–96 Virginia Tech Hokies men's basketball team =

American college basketball season

1995–96 Virginia Tech Hokies men's basketball

A-10 West Champions

NCAA Tournament, Round of 32
- Conference: Atlantic 10 Conference
- West

Ranking
- Coaches: No. 21
- AP: No. 22
- Record: 23–6 (13–3 A-10)
- Head coach: Bill Foster (5th season)
- Home arena: Cassell Coliseum

1995–96 Atlantic 10 men's basketball standings
	Conf.				Overall
Team	W		L	PCT	W		L	PCT
East
No. 1 UMass †	15	–	1	.938	35	–	2	.946
Temple	12	–	4	.750	20	–	13	.606
Saint Joseph's	9	–	7	.563	19	–	13	.594
Rhode Island	8	–	8	.500	20	–	14	.588
St. Bonaventure	4	–	12	.250	10	–	18	.357
Fordham	2	–	14	.125	4	–	23	.148
West
No. 22 Virginia Tech	13	–	3	.813	23	–	6	.793
George Washington	13	–	3	.813	21	–	8	.724
Xavier	8	–	8	.500	13	–	15	.464
Dayton	6	–	10	.375	15	–	14	.517
Duquesne	3	–	13	.188	9	–	18	.333
La Salle	3	–	13	.188	6	–	24	.200
† 1996 Atlantic 10 Tournament winner Rankings from AP Poll

The 1995–96 Virginia Tech Hokies men's basketball team represented Virginia Polytechnic Institute and State University from Blacksburg, Virginia, in the 1995–96 season.

In their first season in the Atlantic-10 Conference, the Hokies finished with a conference record of 13–3, first in the A-10 west division. After falling to John Calipari's Massachusetts in the A-10 tournament, the Hokies received an at-large bid to the NCAA tournament, where they would beat Green Bay in the first round, before falling to Rick Pitino's eventual National Champion Kentucky in the Round of 32.

== Schedule and results ==
Date time, TV	Rank^{#}	Opponent^{#}	Result	Record	Site city, state
Regular season
Mar 2, 1996		at Dayton	W 73–54	22–4 (13–3)	University of Dayton Arena; Dayton, Ohio
A-10 tournament
Mar 7, 1996*	No. 15	vs. Rhode Island; Quarterfinals	L 71–77	22–5	Convention Hall; Philadelphia, Pennsylvania
NCAA tournament
Mar 14, 1996*	(9 MW) No. 22	vs. (8 MW) Wisconsin–Green Bay; First round	W 61–48	23–5	Reunion Arena; Dallas, Texas
Mar 16, 1996*	(9 MW) No. 22	vs. (1 MW) No. 2 Kentucky; Second round	L 60–84	23–6	Reunion Arena; Dallas, Texas
*Non-conference game. ^{#}Rankings from AP Poll. (#) Tournament seedings in parentheses. MW=Midwest.

=== Tournament results ===
A-10 Tournament
3/7/96 Quarterfinal Vs. Rhode Island - L, 71-77 @ Philadelphia Convention Hall, Philadelphia, PA
NCAA Tournament
3/14/96 First Round Vs. Green Bay - W, 61-48 @ Reunion Arena, Dallas, TX
3/16/96 Round of 32 Vs. Kentucky - L, 60-84 @ Reunion Arena, Dallas, TX
