= 1995–96 Cincinnati Bearcats men's basketball team =

American college basketball season

1995–96 Cincinnati Bearcats men's basketball

C-USA regular season champions C-USA tournament champions

NCAA tournament, Elite Eight
- Conference: Conference USA

Ranking
- Coaches: No. 6
- AP: No. 7
- Record: 28–5 (11–3 C-USA)
- Head coach: Bob Huggins (7th season)
- Assistant coaches: Larry Harrison; Steve Moeller; John Loyer
- Home arena: Myrl Shoemaker Center

1995–96 Conference USA men's basketball standings
	Conf.				Overall
Team	W		L	PCT	W		L	PCT
Blue
No. 7 Cincinnati †	11	–	3	.786	28	–	5	.848
No. 20 Marquette	10	–	4	.714	23	–	8	.742
Saint Louis	4	–	10	.286	16	–	14	.533
DePaul	2	–	12	.143	11	–	18	.379
Red
Tulane	9	–	5	.643	22	–	10	.688
UAB	6	–	8	.429	16	–	14	.533
Southern Miss	6	–	8	.429	12	–	15	.444
South Florida	2	–	12	.143	12	–	16	.429
White
No. 16 Memphis	11	–	3	.786	22	–	8	.733
No. 24 Louisville	10	–	4	.714	22	–	12	.647
UNC Charlotte	6	–	8	.429	14	–	15	.483
† 1996 Conference USA Tournament winner Rankings from AP Poll

The 1995–96 Cincinnati Bearcats men's basketball team represented the University of Cincinnati in NCAA Division I competition in the 1995–96 season. The Bearcats, coached by Bob Huggins, won Conference USA and reached the Elite Eight of the 1996 NCAA tournament. The team finished with an overall record of 28–5 (11–3 GMWC) and a No. 7 ranking in the final AP poll.

== Roster ==
1995–96 Cincinnati Bearcats men's basketball team
Players
Coaches

Pos.	#	Name	Height	Weight	Year	Hometown
F	34	Bobby Brannen	6 ft 7 in (2.01 m)	—	So	Cincinnati
G	33	Darnell Burton	6 ft 2 in (1.88 m)	—	Jr	Lexington, Kentucky
G	--	Terrence Davis	6 ft 3 in (1.91 m)	—	Jr
F	--	Ryan Fletcher	6 ft 9 in (2.06 m)	—	Jr	Franklin, Ohio
G	3	Damon Flint	6 ft 5 in (1.96 m)	—	Jr	Cincinnati
PF	25	Danny Fortson	6 ft 7 in (2.01 m)	250 lb (113 kg)	So	Pittsburgh, Pennsylvania
F	21	Keith Gregor	6 ft 5 in (1.96 m)	205 lb (93 kg)	Sr	Cincinnati, Ohio
F	--	Julson Jackson	6 ft 9 in (2.06 m)	—	So
G	4	Keith LeGree	6 ft 1 in (1.85 m)	—	Sr
G		Melvin Levett	6 ft 3 in (1.91 m)	—	Fr	Cleveland, Ohio
C	00	Art Long	6 ft 9 in (2.06 m)	245 lb (111 kg)	Sr	Rochester, New York
F	--	Rod Monroe (W)	6 ft 4 in (1.93 m)	—	So

Head coach

- Bob Huggins (West Virginia)

Assistant coach(es)

- Larry Harrison (Pittsburgh)
- Steve Moeller (Otterbein)
- John Loyer (Akron)

Legend

- (C) Team captain
- (S) Suspended
- (I) Ineligible
- (W) Walk-on
- Injured
- Current redshirt

== Schedule ==
Date time, TV	Rank^{#}	Opponent^{#}	Result	Record	Site city, state
Non-conference regular season
Nov 29, 1995*	No. 21	Wyoming	W 101–51	1–0	Myrl Shoemaker Center; Cincinnati, Ohio
Nov 30, 1995*	No. 17	UNC Wilmington	W 82–47	2–0	Myrl Shoemaker Center; Cincinnati, Ohio
Dec 8, 1995*	No. 17	Wagner	W 100–64	3–0	Myrl Shoemaker Center; Cincinnati, Ohio
Dec 9, 1995*	No. 17	at Arkansas	W 82–67	4–0	Bud Walton Arena; Fayetteville, Arkansas
Dec 12, 1995*	No. 12	Minnesota	W 84–50	5–0	Myrl Shoemaker Center; Cincinnati, Ohio
Dec 16, 1995*	No. 12	vs. Temple	W 70–49	6–0	Gund Arena; Cleveland, Ohio
Dec 20, 1995*	No. 9	at No. 24 California	W 77–70	7–0	Harmon Gym; Berkeley, California
Dec 30, 1995*	No. 5	McNeese State	W 103–69	8–0	Myrl Shoemaker Center; Cincinnati, Ohio
C-USA Regular Season
Jan 6, 1996	No. 5	at South Florida	W 71–69	9–0 (1–0)	Sun Dome; Tampa, Florida
Jan 11, 1996	No. 4	at Southern Miss	W 75–70	10–0 (2–0)	Reed Green Coliseum; Hattiesburg, Mississippi
Jan 13, 1996	No. 4	Marquette	W 91–70	11–0 (3–0)	Myrl Shoemaker Center; Cincinnati, Ohio
Jan 17, 1996*	No. 3	at Xavier	W 99–90	12–0	Cincinnati Gardens; Cincinnati, Ohio
Jan 21, 1996	No. 3	at UAB	L 68–70	12–1 (3–1)	UAB Arena; Birmingham, Alabama
Jan 25, 1996	No. 5	DePaul	W 71–61	13–1 (4–1)	Myrl Shoemaker Center; Cincinnati, Ohio
Jan 28, 1996*	No. 5	USC	W 85–53	14–1	Myrl Shoemaker Center; Cincinnati, Ohio
Jan 31, 1996	No. 5	UNC Charlotte	W 78–64	15–1 (5–1)	Myrl Shoemaker Center; Cincinnati, Ohio
Feb 2, 1996*	No. 5	Illinois State	W 91–57	16–1	Myrl Shoemaker Center; Cincinnati, Ohio
Feb 4, 1996	No. 5	South Florida	W 79–60	17–1 (6–1)	Myrl Shoemaker Center; Cincinnati, Ohio
Feb 7, 1996	No. 5	Saint Louis	W 81–49	18–1 (7–1)	Myrl Shoemaker Center; Cincinnati, Ohio
Feb 11, 1996*	No. 5	vs. No. 16 Arizona	L 76–79	18–2	Veterans Memorial Coliseum; Phoenix, Arizona
Feb 17, 1996	No. 6	at DePaul	W 87–60	19–2 (8–1)	Rosemont Horizon; Rosemont, Illinois
Feb 19, 1996	No. 6	at Saint Louis	W 69–64	20–2 (9–1)	Kiel Arena; St. Louis, Missouri
Feb 22, 1996	No. 6	No. 21 Louisville	L 66–72	20–3 (9–2)	Myrl Shoemaker Center; Cincinnati, Ohio
Feb 25, 1996	No. 6	at Tulane	W 65–63	21–3 (10–2)	Avron B. Fogelman Arena; New Orleans, Louisiana
Feb 29, 1996	No. 7	No. 14 Memphis	W 71–66	22–3 (11–2)	Myrl Shoemaker Center; Cincinnati, Ohio
Mar 2, 1996	No. 7	at Marquette	L 72–74	22–4 (11–3)	Bradley Center; Milwaukee, Wisconsin
C-USA Tournament
Mar 7, 1996	(1) No. 8	vs. (9) Saint Louis; Quarterfinals	W 62–59 ^{OT}	23–4	Pyramid Arena; Memphis, Tennessee
Mar 8, 1996	(1) No. 8	vs. (4) No. 22 Louisville; Semifinals	W 92–81	24–4	Pyramid Arena; Memphis, Tennessee
Mar 9, 1996	(1) No. 8	vs. (3) No. 21 Marquette; Championship Game	W 85–84 ^{OT}	25–4	Pyramid Arena; Memphis, Tennessee
NCAA Tournament
Mar 15, 1996*	(2 SE) No. 7	vs. (15 SE) UNC Greensboro; First round	W 66–61	26–4	Orlando Arena; Orlando, Florida
Mar 17, 1996	(2 SE) No. 7	vs. (7 SE) Temple; Second Round	W 78–65	27–4	Orlando Arena; Orlando, Florida
Mar 22, 1996	(2 SE) No. 7	vs. (3 SE) No. 13 Georgia Tech; Southeast Regional semifinal – Sweet Sixteen	W 87–70	28–4	Rupp Arena; Lexington, Kentucky
Mar 24, 1996	(2 SE) No. 7	vs. (5 SE) No. 19 Mississippi State; Southeast Regional Final – Elite Eight	L 63–73	28–5	Rupp Arena; Lexington, Kentucky
*Non-conference game. ^{#}Rankings from AP poll. (#) Tournament seedings in parentheses. SE=Southeast.

== Rankings ==
Ranking movements Legend: ██ Increase in ranking ██ Decrease in ranking
	Week																		
Poll	Pre	1	2	3	4	5	6	7	8	9	10	11	12	13	14	15	16	17	Final
AP	21	21	21	17	12	9	5	5	4	3	5	5	5	6	6	7	8	7	Not released
Coaches	20	21	21	17	10	9	6	4	4	4	3	5	5	4	6	6	9	6	6

== Awards and honors ==
- Danny Fortson – C-USA Player of the Year, Consensus Second-Team All-American
