= 1995–96 Louisville Cardinals men's basketball team =

American college basketball season

1995–96 Louisville Cardinals men's basketball

NCAA tournament, Sweet Sixteen
- Conference: Conference USA

Ranking
- Coaches: No. 14
- AP: No. 24
- Record: 22–12 (10–4 CUSA)
- Head coach: Denny Crum (25th season)
- Home arena: Freedom Hall

1995–96 Conference USA men's basketball standings
	Conf.				Overall
Team	W		L	PCT	W		L	PCT
Blue
No. 7 Cincinnati †	11	–	3	.786	28	–	5	.848
No. 20 Marquette	10	–	4	.714	23	–	8	.742
Saint Louis	4	–	10	.286	16	–	14	.533
DePaul	2	–	12	.143	11	–	18	.379
Red
Tulane	9	–	5	.643	22	–	10	.688
UAB	6	–	8	.429	16	–	14	.533
Southern Miss	6	–	8	.429	12	–	15	.444
South Florida	2	–	12	.143	12	–	16	.429
White
No. 16 Memphis	11	–	3	.786	22	–	8	.733
No. 24 Louisville	10	–	4	.714	22	–	12	.647
UNC Charlotte	6	–	8	.429	14	–	15	.483
† 1996 Conference USA Tournament winner Rankings from AP Poll

The 1995–96 Louisville Cardinals men's basketball team represented the University of Louisville in the 1995–96 NCAA Division I men's basketball season. The head coach was Denny Crum and the team finished the season with an overall record of 22–12.

== Schedule and results ==
Date time, TV	Rank^{#}	Opponent^{#}	Result	Record	Site city, state
Regular Season
Nov 24, 1995*	No. 13	at American–Puerto Rico; Puerto Rico Shootout – Quarterfinals	W 90–86	1–0	Eugenio Guerra Sports Complex; San Juan, Puerto Rico
Nov 25, 1995*	No. 13	vs. VCU; Puerto Rico Shootout – Semifinals	W 83–74	2–0	Eugenio Guerra Sports Complex; San Juan, Puerto Rico
Nov 26, 1995*	No. 13	vs. Auburn; Puerto Rico Shootout – Championship Game	L 78–82	2–1	Eugenio Guerra Sports Complex; San Juan, Puerto Rico
Nov 30, 1995*	No. 18	at Boston College	L 67–81	2–2	Conte Forum; Boston, Massachusetts
Dec 2, 1995*	No. 18	Michigan State	W 79–59	3–2	Freedom Hall; Louisville, Kentucky
Dec 6, 1995*	No. 23	Morehead State	W 119–61	4–2	Freedom Hall; Louisville, Kentucky
Dec 9, 1995*	No. 23	Texas	W 101–78	5–2	Freedom Hall; Louisville, Kentucky
Dec 13, 1995*	No. 20	Eastern Kentucky	W 87–70	6–2	Freedom Hall; Louisville, Kentucky
Dec 16, 1995*	No. 20	at No. 19 Georgia Tech	L 77–88	6–3	Alexander Memorial Coliseum; Atlanta, Georgia
Dec 20, 1995*	No. 25	Murray State	W 81–72	7–3	Freedom Hall; Louisville, Kentucky
Dec 23, 1995*	No. 25	at No. 4 Kentucky	L 66–89	7–4	Rupp Arena; Lexington, Kentucky
Dec 30, 1995*		Towson	W 96–82	8–4	Freedom Hall; Louisville, Kentucky
Jan 3, 1996		at St. Louis	W 67–63	9–4 (1–0)	Kiel Center; St. Louis, Missouri
Jan 7, 1996		at DePaul	W 87–71	10–4 (2–0)	Rosemont Horizon; Rosemont, Illinois
Jan 10, 1996		Charlotte	L 66–78	10–5 (2–1)	Freedom Hall; Louisville, Kentucky
Jan 13, 1996*		at St. John's	L 64–86	10–6	Madison Square Garden; New York, New York
Jan 17, 1996		at UAB	W 78–70	11–6 (3–1)	UAB Arena; Birmingham, Alabama
Jan 21, 1996		Southern Miss	W 87–61	12–6 (4–1)	Freedom Hall; Louisville, Kentucky
Jan 24, 1996		St. Louis	W 61–57	13–6 (5–1)	Freedom Hall; Louisville, Kentucky
Jan 27, 1996*		at No. 15 UCLA	W 78–76	14–6	Pauley Pavilion; Los Angeles, California
Jan 31, 1996		at South Florida	W 57–54	15–6 (6–1)	Sun Dome; Tampa, Florida
Feb 3, 1996		No. 11 Memphis	W 74–56	16–6 (7–1)	Freedom Hall; Louisville, Kentucky
Feb 8, 1996	No. 20	Tulane	L 65–68	16–7 (7–2)	Freedom Hall; Louisville, Kentucky
Feb 10, 1996	No. 20	UAB	W 81–66	17–7 (8–2)	Freedom Hall; Louisville, Kentucky
Feb 15, 1996	No. 24	at Charlotte	W 67–64	18–7 (9–2)	Independence Arena; Charlotte, North Carolina
Feb 22, 1996	No. 21	at No. 6 Cincinnati	W 72–66	19–7 (10–2)	Shoemaker Center; Cincinnati, Ohio
Feb 25, 1996	No. 21	at No. 19 Memphis	L 54–57	19–8 (10–3)	The Pyramid; Memphis, Tennessee
Feb 28, 1996	No. 21	Marquette	L 79–80 ^{2OT}	19–9 (10–4)	Freedom Hall; Louisville, Kentucky
Mar 2, 1996*	No. 21	No. 2 UMass	L 59–62	19–10	Freedom Hall; Louisville, Kentucky
Conference USA Tournament
Mar 7, 1996	No. 22	vs. Tulane; Quarterfinals	W 98–79	20–10	The Pyramid; Memphis, Tennessee
Mar 8, 1996	No. 22	vs. No. 6 Cincinnati; Semifinals	L 81–92	20–11	The Pyramid; Memphis, Tennessee
NCAA Tournament
Mar 15, 1996*	(6 MW) No. 24	vs. (11 MW) Tulsa; First Round	W 82–80 ^{OT}	21–11	Bradley Center; Milwaukee, Wisconsin
Mar 17, 1996*	(6 MW) No. 24	vs. (3 MW) No. 10 Villanova; Second Round	W 68–64	22–11	Bradley Center; Milwaukee, Wisconsin
Mar 21, 1996*	(6 MW) No. 24	vs. (2 MW) No. 9 Wake Forest; Sweet Sixteen	L 59–60	22–12	The Metrodome; Minneapolis, Minnesota
*Non-conference game. ^{#}Rankings from AP Poll. (#) Tournament seedings in parentheses. MW=Midwest.
