= 1995–96 George Washington Colonials men's basketball team =

American college basketball season

1995–96 George Washington Colonials men's basketball

A-10 West regular season co-champions

NCAA tournament, First round
- Conference: Atlantic 10 Conference
- West
- Record: 21–8 (13–3 A-10)
- Head coach: Mike Jarvis (6th season)
- Home arena: Charles E. Smith Athletic Center

1995–96 Atlantic 10 men's basketball standings
	Conf.				Overall
Team	W		L	PCT	W		L	PCT
East
No. 1 UMass †	15	–	1	.938	35	–	2	.946
Temple	12	–	4	.750	20	–	13	.606
Saint Joseph's	9	–	7	.563	19	–	13	.594
Rhode Island	8	–	8	.500	20	–	14	.588
St. Bonaventure	4	–	12	.250	10	–	18	.357
Fordham	2	–	14	.125	4	–	23	.148
West
No. 22 Virginia Tech	13	–	3	.813	23	–	6	.793
George Washington	13	–	3	.813	21	–	8	.724
Xavier	8	–	8	.500	13	–	15	.464
Dayton	6	–	10	.375	15	–	14	.517
Duquesne	3	–	13	.188	9	–	18	.333
La Salle	3	–	13	.188	6	–	24	.200
† 1996 Atlantic 10 Tournament winner Rankings from AP Poll

The 1995–96 George Washington Colonials men's basketball team represent George Washington University as a member of the Atlantic 10 Conference during the 1995–96 NCAA Division I men's basketball season. The team was coached by Mike Jarvis and played their home games at the Charles E. Smith Athletic Center. The Colonials finished in a tie for first place in the West division of the A-10 regular season conference standings. After being knocked out in the semifinal round of the A-10 tournament, GW received an at-large bid to the 1996 NCAA tournament as No. 11 seed in the West region. The Colonials fell to No. 6 seed Iowa, 81–79, to finish with a record of 21–8 (13–3 A-10).

== Roster ==
1993–94 George Washington Colonials men's basketball team
Players
Coaches

Pos.	#	Name	Height	Weight	Year	Hometown
G		Kwame Evans	6 ft 7 in (2.01 m)	—	Sr
C		Alexander Koul	7 ft 1 in (2.16 m)	—	So

Head coach

- Mike Jarvis (Northeastern)

Assistant coach(es)

Legend

- (C) Team captain
- (S) Suspended
- (I) Ineligible
- (W) Walk-on
- Injured
- Current redshirt

Roster

== Schedule and results ==
Date time, TV	Rank^{#}	Opponent^{#}	Result	Record	Site city, state
Regular season
Nov 24, 1995*		Hartford	W 81–69	1–0	Charles E. Smith Center; Washington, D.C.
Nov 25, 1995*		Hampton	W 80–73	2–0	Charles E. Smith Center; Washington, D.C.
Dec 2, 1995*		vs. Florida; Franklin National Bank Classic	L 66–75	2–1	USAir Arena; Landover, Maryland
Dec 3, 1995*		vs. No. 19 Maryland; Franklin National Bank Classic	L 81–98	2–2	USAir Arena; Landover, Maryland
Dec 5, 1995*		at James Madison	W 76–68	3–2	JMU Convocation Center; Harrisonburg, Virginia
Dec 9, 1995*		vs. South Florida	W 71–69	4–2	ThunderDom; St. Petersburg, Florida
Dec 27, 1995*		at Sacramento State	W 98–81	5–2	Hornets Nest; Sacramento, California
Dec 28, 1995*		vs. Idaho	W 84–83 ^{2OT}	6–2	ARCO Arena; Sacramento, California
Jan 6, 1996		at Duquesne	W 87–59	7–2 (1–0)	A.J. Palumbo Center; Pittsburgh, Pennsylvania
Jan 9, 1996		St. Bonaventure	W 87–78	8–2 (2–0)	Charles E. Smith Center; Washington, D.C.
Jan 13, 1996*		at Missouri	L 77–92	8–3	Hearnes Center; Columbia, Missouri
Jan 15, 1996*		at No. 11 Virginia Tech	L 71–79	8–4 (2–1)	Cassell Coliseum; Blacksburg, Virginia
Jan 21, 1996		Dayton	W 77–58	9–4 (3–1)	Charles E. Smith Center; Washington, D.C.
Jan 25, 1996		No. 8 Virginia Tech	W 64–47	10–4 (4–1)	Charles E. Smith Center; Washington, D.C.
Feb 1, 1996		at Dayton	W 77–65	11–4 (5–1)	University of Dayton Arena; Dayton, Ohio
Feb 3, 1996*		Temple	W 64–47	12–4 (6–1)	Charles E. Smith Center; Washington, D.C.
Feb 5, 1996*		UNC Charlotte	W 72–67	13–4	Charles E. Smith Center; Washington, D.C.
Feb 7, 1996		Xavier	W 77–69	14–4 (7–1)	Charles E. Smith Center; Washington, D.C.
Feb 10, 1996		La Salle	W 92–83	15–4 (8–1)	Charles E. Smith Center; Washington, D.C.
Feb 13, 1996		at Fordham	W 77–62	16–4 (9–1)	Rose Hill Gymnasium; Bronx, New York
Feb 18, 1996		at La Salle	L 70–76	16–5 (9–2)	Convention Hall; Philadelphia, Pennsylvania
Feb 21, 1996		Duquesne	W 84–72	17–5 (10–2)	Charles E. Smith Center; Washington, D.C.
Feb 24, 1996		at No. 1 UMass	W 86–76	18–5 (11–2)	Mullins Center; Amherst, Massachusetts
Feb 26, 1996		at Xavier	W 81–77	19–5 (12–2)	Cincinnati Gardens; Cincinnati, Ohio
Feb 29, 1996		Rhode Island	W 76–72	20–5 (13–2)	Charles E. Smith Center; Washington, D.C.
Mar 2, 1996		at Saint Joseph's	L 82–86	20–6 (13–3)	Alumni Memorial Fieldhouse; Philadelphia, Pennsylvania
Atlantic 10 Tournament
Mar 7, 1996*		at Saint Joseph's; Quarterfinals	W 81–71	21–6	Convention Hall; Philadelphia, Pennsylvania
Mar 8, 1996*		vs. No. 2 UMass; Semifinals	L 65–74	21–7	Convention Hall; Philadelphia, Pennsylvania
NCAA Tournament
Mar 15, 1996*	(11 W)	vs. (6 W) No. 21 Iowa; First round	L 79–81	21–8	ASU Activity Center; Tempe, Arizona
*Non-conference game. ^{#}Rankings from AP poll. (#) Tournament seedings in parentheses. W=West.
