= Carmelo Travieso =

Puerto Rican basketball player

Personal information
- Born: 9 May 1975 (age 51) Río Piedras, Puerto Rico
- Listed height: 6 ft 2 in (1.88 m)
- Listed weight: 180 lb (82 kg)

Career information
- High school: Thayer Academy (Braintree, Massachusetts)
- College: UMass (1993–1997)
- NBA draft: 1997: undrafted
- Position: Guard

Career highlights
- Atlantic 10 tournament MVP (1996)

Carmelo Travieso (born 9 May 1975) is a Puerto Rican basketball player. He competed in the men's tournament at the 1996 Summer Olympics.

Travieso was born in Puerto Rico but moved with his mother and four siblings to Dorchester, Boston at four years old after his parents divorced. Growing up, the family was extremely poor and sometimes had to choose between food and heat. As a teenager, he earned a $44,000 scholarship to attend Thayer Academy and play basketball. He was named the Gatorade Player of the Year for Massachusetts in 1992–93. He went on to play for the very successful UMass Minutemen basketball teams of the 1990s, for whom he was described by the N.Y. Times News Service as the team's "best pure shooter" and "a skilled surgeon." After college, he played basketball professionally in Puerto Rico and the Dominican Republic and became a mortgage broker.
