= Yegor Mescheriakov =

Belarusian basketball player

Personal information
- Born: 9 October 1976 (age 50) Minsk, Byelorussian SSR, Soviet Union
- Listed height: 6 ft 8 in (2.03 m)
- Listed weight: 235 lb (107 kg)

Career information
- High school: Republic College of Olympic Reserve (Minsk, Belarus)
- College: George Washington (1995–1999)
- NBA draft: 1999: undrafted
- Playing career: 1999–2010
- Position: Power forward

Career history
- 1999–2000: Scandone Avellino
- 2000–2001: Beşiktaş
- 2001: Aurora Basket Jesi
- 2001–2003: Orlandina Basket
- 2003–2004: Makedonikos
- 2004–2005: Aris
- 2005–2007: UNICS Kazan
- 2007–2008: Azovmash Mariupol
- 2008–2010: Spartak Saint Petersburg

Career highlights
- USL champion (2008); Ukrainian Cup champion (2008); Ukrainian Cup Final MVP (2008); 2× Second-team All-Atlantic 10 (1997, 1999); Third-team All-Atlantic 10 (1998); Atlantic 10 All-Freshman team (1996)

Yegor Mescheriakov (Belarusian: Ягор Мешчаракоў, romanized: Yegor Meshcherakov; born 9 October 1976) is a Belarusian former professional basketball player. He played college basketball in the United States for the George Washington Revolutionaries from 1995 to 1999. Mescheriakov played professionally in Italy, Turkey, Greece, Russia and Ukraine.

== Early life ==
Mescheriakov is from Minsk, Belarus. He is the eldest son of Valera and Lorisa Mescheriakov who worked as engineers. Mescheriakov attended the Republic College of Olympic Reserve in Minsk.

== College career ==
Mescheriakov joined the George Washington Revolutionaries in 1995. He was one of four players from Belarus on the Revolutionaries roster during the 1995–96 season. He averaged 9.7 points per game as a freshman and was named to the Atlantic 10 Conference All-Freshman team in 1996. Mescheriakov averaged a team-high 16.6 points per game as a sophomore and was selected to the All-Atlantic 10 second-team in 1997. He averaged 12.7 points per game as a junior and was chosen for the All-Atlantic 10 third-team in 1998. Mescheriakov averaged a career-best 17.6 points and 6.8 rebounds per game during his senior season to earn a second All-Atlantic 10 second-team nomination. His 1,645 career points rank eighth in program history.

Mescheriakov was inducted in the GW Athletics Hall of Fame in 2018.

== Professional career ==
Mescheriakov started his professional career with Scandone Avellino in Italy during the 1999–2000 season. He played for Beşiktaş during the 2000–01 season and then returned to Italy to finish the season with Aurora Basket Jesi. Mescheriakov played for Orlandina Basket in Italy from 2001 to 2003. He played in Greece from 2003 to 2005 with one-season stints for Makedonikos and Aris. Mescheriakov spent two seasons with UNICS Kazan from 2005 to 2007. He won the Ukrainian national championship and the Ukrainian Basketball Cup as a member of Azovmash Mariupol in 2008. Mescheriakov ended his career with two seasons playing for Spartak Saint Petersburg from 2008 to 2010.

== National team career ==
Mescheriakov helped Belarus win the FIBA under-22 European championship in 1994.

Mescheriakov represented Belarus in 3x3 basketball until he retired shortly before he turned 40.

== Post-playing career ==
Mescheriakov returned to George Washington University in 2010 to complete his master's degree in tourism administration and sports management. During his studies, he worked as an intern with the Washington Wizards and in the university's athletics department. He graduated in 2012.

After his graduation, Mescheriakov returned to Belarus where he worked as a player agent and general manager of BC Minsk. He leads the Mescheriakov Basketball Club private program to help develop youth talent in Minsk. He has served as an assistant coach for the national team.

Mescheriakov was a vice president of the Belarusian Basketball Federation until he resigned in 2020 in protest of the Belarusian government not assisting Yelena Leuchanka after her imprisonment.

== Personal life ==
Mescheriakov lives in Minsk with his wife, Tanya, and daughter. His younger brother, Nikita, also played basketball.
