= Shawnta Rogers =

American basketball player (born 1976)

Personal information
- Born: January 5, 1976 (age 50) Baltimore, Maryland, U.S.
- Listed height: 5 ft 4 in (1.63 m)
- Listed weight: 158 lb (72 kg)

Career information
- High school: Lake Clifton (Baltimore, Maryland)
- College: George Washington (1995–1999)
- NBA draft: 1999: undrafted
- Playing career: 1999–2010
- Position: Point guard

Career history
- 1999–2000: Baltimore Bayrunners
- 2000–2003: Le Mans Sarthe
- 2003–2004: ASVEL Villeurbanne
- 2004–2005: Pallacanestro Cantù
- 2005–2006: Ignis Castelletto Ticino
- 2006–2007: Dexia Mons-Hainaut
- 2007: Le Mans Sarthe
- 2007–2008: Élan Chalon
- 2008: RB Montecatini Terme
- 2009: Hyères-Toulon
- 2009–2010: Rouen

Career highlights
- 2x LNB Pro A All-Star (2001, 2002); Atlantic 10 Player of the Year (1999); Frances Pomeroy Naismith Award (1999); NCAA steals leader (1999)

Shawnta Darnell Rogers (born January 5, 1976) is an American former professional basketball player and former star of George Washington Colonials of the Atlantic 10 Conference. He attended Lake Clifton High School in Baltimore, Maryland, where he was born. A 5-foot-4-inch (1.63 m) point guard, Rogers was named the Atlantic 10 Player of the Year in 1999. He also won the Frances Pomeroy Naismith Award, for the best NCAA player under 6 feet, in 1999. He also led men's college basketball in steals that year. In 2011, Rogers was named to GW's Athletics Hall of Fame.

== After college ==
Rogers was selected by the Rockford Lightning in the 6th round (#47 pick overall) of 1999 CBA Draft.

Rogers began his pro career with the Baltimore Bayrunners of the IBL for the 99–00 season, then played for many successful European teams. He played at Le Mans Sarthe Basket in the Ligue Nationale de Basketball Pro A, the top league in France, from 2000 to 2003, where he was an All-Star twice. He then moved to ASVEL Lyon-Villeurbanne (Pro A) in 2003–04, Pallacanestro Cantù in Italy in 2004–2005, Basket Draghi Novara also in Italy in 2005–06, Dexia Mons-Hainaut in Belgium and again Le Mans in 2006–07, and ÉS Chalon-sur-Saône (Pro A) in 2007–2008. In 2008-2009 he played for Hyeres-Toulon in France, and in 2009-2010 for SPO Rouen Basket, also in France.

He appeared multiple times in the ULEB Cup and the Euroleague.

== Career stats at George Washington ==
- 1995-96: 10.5 ppg, 4.7 rpg, 6.5 apg, 2.0 spg
- 1996-97: 12.9 ppg, 5.7 rpg, 4.4 apg, 2.8 spg
- 1997-98: 14.9 ppg, 4.4 rpg, 4.8 apg, 2.4 spg
- 1998-99: 20.7 ppg, 4.0 rpg, 6.8 apg, 3.6 spg

== See also ==
- List of NCAA Division I men's basketball season steals leaders
