= George Washington Revolutionaries men's basketball =

George Washington University's NCAA men's basketball team

George Washington Revolutionaries
| 2026–27 George Washington Revolutionaries men's basketball team |
- University: George Washington University
- First season: 1912–13
- Head coach: Chris Caputo (5th season)
- Location: Washington, D.C., U.S.
- Arena: Charles E. Smith Center (capacity: 5,000)
- Conference: Atlantic 10 Conference
- Nickname: Revolutionaries
- Colors: Buff and blue
- Student section: George's Army
- All-time record: 1,325–1,109 (.544)

NCAA Division I tournament Sweet Sixteen
- 1993

NCAA Division I tournament appearances
- 1954, 1961, 1993, 1994, 1996, 1998, 1999, 2005, 2006, 2007, 2014

NIT champions
- 2016

Conference tournament champions
- 1943, 1954, 1961, 2005, 2007

Conference regular-season champions
- 1954, 1956, 1999, 2005, 2006

Conference division champions
- 1996, 1998, 1999

Uniforms
| Home | Away | Alternate |

The George Washington Revolutionaries men's basketball team represents George Washington University in Washington, D.C. They play their home games in the Charles E. Smith Center, an indoor arena that is also shared with other George Washington Revolutionaries athletic programs. The school's team currently competes in the Atlantic 10 Conference. The former name of the team, the George Washington Colonials, was changed in May 2023 to the current name.

The head coach is Chris Caputo, a former University of Miami coach, and the official dance team for the team is the GW First Ladies.

== History ==
=== 20th century ===
Mike Jarvis was hired as head coach in 1990. Led by Yinka Dare, the Colonials received an at-large bid to the 1993 NCAA tournament, the Colonials first NCAA Tournament appearance since 1961. GW advanced to the Sweet Sixteen before losing to the Fab Five Michigan team (which later vacated its wins due to NCAA rule violations).

The Colonials would also make NCAA Tournament appearances in 1994, 1996, and 1998 under Jarvis. Jarvis would leave the school in 1998 to accept the head coaching position at St. John's.

The school then hired recently fired Texas head coach, Thomas Penders. Penders would spend three years at GW, before resigning amidst accusations of NCAA rules violations.

=== 21st century ===
On May 2, 2001, the university hired Karl Hobbs, who spent eight years as an assistant coach at Connecticut, as head coach. In 2004, Hobbs led GW to back to the national stage, defeating ninth-ranked Michigan State and No. 12 Maryland in back-to-back games to win the 2004 BB&T Classic. That year, the men's basketball team went on to win the Atlantic 10 West title and the Atlantic 10 tournament, earning an automatic bid to the 2005 NCAA tournament. The team received a No. 12 seed, losing to No. 5 seed Georgia Tech in the First Round.

The team began the 2005–06 season ranked 21st in the Associated Press poll, reaching as high as sixth in the polls and closed out the year ranked 19th in the nation. With a 26–2 going into the 2006 NCAA tournament. They received an at-large bid to the Tournament as a No. 8 seed where they came back from an 18-point second-half deficit to defeat No. 9 seed UNC-Wilmington. However, in the Second Round, they lost to Duke, the top overall seed. J. R. Pinnock was drafted in the 2006 NBA draft and two other Colonials from that team played in the NBA. Pops Mensah-Bonsu played for the Dallas Mavericks, Houston Rockets, San Antonio Spurs, and Toronto Raptors and Mike Hall played for the Washington Wizards.

The 2006–07 basketball season was considered by many to be a rebuilding year for the Colonials after graduating their entire starting front court and losing Pinnock to the NBA. Coach Karl Hobbs and Senior guard Carl Elliott led the team to a 23–8 record, winning the 2007 Atlantic 10 tournament, once again earning an automatic bid to the NCAA tournament. The Colonials received a No. 11 seed and lost to No. 6-seed Vanderbilt.

The Colonials would struggle the next three years and after finishing the 2010–11 season with a record of 17–14, capped by a disappointing 71–59 overtime loss to Saint Joseph's in the conference tournament, Karl Hobbs was dismissed as head coach.

On May 11, 2011, Mike Lonergan, former head coach of Vermont, was hired to replace Hobbs.

The 2011–12 basketball season, Lonergan's first with the Colonials, resulted in a 10–21 record (5–11 in Atlantic 10). By the 2013–14 season, Lonergan had rebuilt the program and finished third in the Atlantic 10 with a 24–8 record (11–5 in Atlantic 10). The team received an at-large bid to the 2014 NCAA Tournament, its first NCAA Tournament since 2007. They received a No. 9 seed in the East Region and would lose to Memphis in the Second Round (formerly known as the First Round).

The Colonials regressed the following year, finishing 22–12. They did, however, receive a bid to the NIT where they defeated Pittsburgh before losing in the second round to Temple.

In 2016, the Colonials again missed the NCAA Tournament and again received a bid to the NIT. This time the Colonials would defeat Hofstra, Monmouth, and Florida to reach the NIT final four at Madison Square Garden. In the NIT semifinal, they defeated San Diego State to advance to the championship game. In the championship game, they cruised to the NIT championship with a 76–60 win over Valparaiso.

However, the Colonials could not build on their NIT success as the school fired head coach Mike Lonergan on September 16, 2016, after an investigation found him guilty of verbally and emotionally abusing his players.

The school named assistant coach Maurice Joseph interim coach for the 2016–17 season. The Colonials finished the 2017 season 20–15, 10–8 in A-10 play and received a bid to the College Basketball Invitational where they defeated Toledo in the first round before losing to UIC.On March 27, 2017, the school removed the interim tag and named Maurice Joseph full-time head coach.

Joseph was fired after the 2018–19 season. He had an overall 44–57 record (.436) at GW including 21–33 (.389) in the Atlantic 10.

On March 21, 2019, former Siena head coach Jamion Christian was hired as the new head coach. Christian accumulated a 29–50 record in three seasons and was let go.

On April 1, 2022, longtime George Mason and Miami (FL) assistant Chris Caputo was hired as the new coach.

== Postseason ==
=== NCAA tournament results ===
The Revolutionaries have appeared in the NCAA tournament 11 times. Their combined record is 4–11.

| Year | Seed | Round | Opponent | Result |
|---|---|---|---|---|
| 1954 | | First Round | NC State | L 73–75 |
| 1961 | | First Round | Princeton | L 67–84 |
| 1993 | No. 12 | First Round; Second Round; Sweet Sixteen | No. 5 New Mexico; No. 13 Southern; No. 1 Michigan | W 82–68; W 90–80; L 64–72 |
| 1994 | No. 10 | First Round; Second Round | No. 7 UAB; No. 2 Connecticut | W 51–46; L 63–75 |
| 1996 | No. 11 | First Round | No. 6 Iowa | L 79–81 |
| 1998 | No. 9 | First Round | No. 8 Oklahoma State | L 59–74 |
| 1999 | No. 11 | First Round | No. 6 Indiana | L 88–108 |
| 2005 | No. 12 | First Round | No. 5 Georgia Tech | L 68–80 |
| 2006 | No. 8 | First Round; Second Round | No. 9 UNC Wilmington; No. 1 Duke | W 88–85^{OT} L 61–74 |
| 2007 | No. 11 | First Round | No. 6 Vanderbilt | L 44–77 |
| 2014 | No. 9 | First Round | No. 8 Memphis | L 66–71 |

=== NIT results ===
The Revolutionaries have appeared in the National Invitation Tournament (NIT) seven times. Their combined record is 7–6. They won the NIT championship in 2016.

| Year | Round | Opponent | Result |
|---|---|---|---|
| 1991 | First round | South Carolina | L 63–69 |
| 1995 | First round | Ohio | L 71–83 |
| 1997 | First round | Michigan State | L 50–65 |
| 2004 | First round | Virginia | L 66–79 |
| 2015 | First round Second round | Pittsburgh; Temple | W 60–54; L 77–90 |
| 2016 | First round Second round Quarterfinals; Semifinals; Final | Hofstra; Monmouth; Florida; San Diego State; Valparaiso | W 82–80; W 87–71; W 82–77; W 65–46; W 76–60 |
| 2026 | First round Second round | Utah Valley; New Mexico | W 79–78; L 61-86 |

=== CBI results ===
The Revolutionaries have appeared in the College Basketball Invitational (CBI) two times. Their combined record is 1–2.

| Year | Round | Opponent | Result |
|---|---|---|---|
| 2010 | First round | VCU | L 73–79 |
| 2017 | First round Quarterfinals | Toledo; UIC | W 73–69; L 71–80 |

=== CBC results ===
The Revolutionaries have appeared in the College Basketball Crown (CBC) once. Their record is 0–1.

| Year | Round | Opponent | Result |
|---|---|---|---|
| 2025 | First round | Boise State | L 59–89 |

== Coaches ==
The Colonials have had 27 coaches in its history including two seasons with two head coaches.

| | | Overall | | Conference | | |
| Name | Years | Record | Pct. | Record | Pct. | Note |
|---|---|---|---|---|---|---|
| J. Kramer | 1906–08 | 7–12 | .368 | | | First collegiate basketball team organized in the District of Columbia. |
| No Varsity | 1909–12 | | | | | |
| Slitz Schlosser | 1913–14 | 4–17 | .190 | | | |
| Nathan Dougherty | 1914–15 | 5–9 | .357 | | | |
| George Colliflower | 1916–17 | 9–18 | .333 | | | |
| Goesbeck & Murphy | 1917–18 | 5–6 | .455 | | | |
| No Varsity (WWI) | 1919–20 | | | | | |
| Brian Morse | 1921–23 | 16–27 | .372 | | | |
| Jack Dailey | 1924–25 | 8–14 | .364 | | | |
| James Lemon | 1926–27 | 12–16 | .429 | | | |
| Maud Crum | 1928–29 | 13–14 | .481 | | | |
| Joe Mitchell | 1929–30 | 9–7 | .563 | | | |
| Jim Pixlee | 1931–32 | 22–9 | .710 | | | |
| Ted O'Leary | 1933–34 | 26–9 | .743 | | | |
| Jim Pixlee & Logan Wilson | 1934–35 | 14–6 | .700 | | | |
| Bill Reinhart | 1936–42, 1950–66 | 319–237 | .574 | | | Southern Conference tournament Champions 1954, 1961; NCAA Tournament 1954, 1961 |
| Arthur "Otts" Zahn | 1942–43, 1946–47 | 45–21 | .682 | | | No Varsity 1944–45 (World War II), Southern Conference tournament Champion 1943 |
| George Garber | 1948–49 | 37–15 | .712 | | | |
| Babe McCarthy | 1966–67 | 6–18 | .250 | | | |
| Wayne Dobbs | 1968–70 | 31–45 | .408 | | | |
| Carl Slone | 1971–74 | 54–48 | .529 | | | |
| Bob Tallent | 1975–81 | 102–84 | .548 | | | |
| Gerry Gimelstob | 1982–85 | 58–55 | .513 | 31–33 | .484 | 1981–82 Season in Eastern Eight Conference, 1982–85 Atlantic 10 |
| John Kuester | 1986–90 | 50–91 | .355 | 20–52 | .278 | |
| Mike Jarvis | 1991–98 | 152–90 | .628 | 76–52 | .594 | NCAA Tournament '93 (Sweet 16), '94, '96, '98; NIT '91, '95, '97 |
| Tom Penders | 1999–2001 | 49–42 | .538 | 28–20 | .583 | NCAA Tournament '99 |
| Karl Hobbs | 2001–2011 | 149–115 | .564 | 74–70 | .514 | NCAA Tournament '05, '06, '07; NIT '04; CBI '10; Atlantic 10 tournament champions '05, '07; Atlantic 10 Regular Season Champions '06; National Coach of the Year Finalist 2005–06 |
| Mike Lonergan | 2011–2016 | 46–45 | .506 | 23–25 | .479 | NCAA Tournament '14; NIT '15, '16 (Champions) |
| Maurice Joseph | 2016–2019 | 44–57 | .436 | 21–33 | .389 | Interim head coach in 2016; named full-time head coach on March 27, 2017 |
| Jamion Christian | 2019–2022 | 29–50 | .367 | 17–26 | .395 | |
| Chris Caputo | 2022–present | 52–46 | .531 | 23–31 | .426 | |

== Notable games ==
GW 97, No. 5 West Virginia 93 – February 17, 1960
After falling to the Mountaineers earlier in the season, an announced crowd of 6,400 watched the Colonials host Jerry West and the nation's fifth-ranked basketball team. Despite giving up 40 points, 13 rebounds and 7 assists to West, GW Athletic Hall of Famer Jon Feldman exploded for a career-high 42 points on 17–25 shooting to stun West Virginia.

GW 111, No. 12 Syracuse 104 (OT) – November 16, 1994
The Colonials were invited to participate in the pre-season NIT at Manley Field House at Syracuse, and though they gave up a last-second three-pointer to allow the Orangemen to send the game to overtime, the Colonials controlled the extra period to secure the win on national television.

GW 78, No. 1 UMass 75 – February 4, 1995
President Bill Clinton joined the Colonials at Charles E. Smith Center when John Calipari and the top-ranked Massachusetts Minutemen came to Washington. Kwame Evans scored 27 points, including his 1,000th and fans rushed the court as the Colonials scored their first-ever upset of a number one team.

GW 78, No. 18 Xavier 73 – OT, January 14, 1998
The Colonials hosted James Posey and the 18th ranked Musketeers at the Charles E. Smith Center. After trailing most of the game, Xavier took control of the game midway through the second half. GW forward Yegor Mescheriakov sprained his right ankle jumping for a rebound and limped off the court with 16:32 remaining. Without its leading scorer, and with Koul on the bench with four fouls, GW sagged. With GW's offense sputtering, Mike King entered the game and rescued the Colonials. King scored eight straight points and tied the game at 63–63. The clock then showed all zeros and the GW men's basketball team trailed 18th-ranked Xavier 68–66. King, a freshman playing his third collegiate game after achieving academic eligibility, calmly made two free throws - sending the game into overtime and the Smith Center into a frenzy. In the overtime, King continued his heroics scoring 8 of GW's 10 points in OT to a 78–73 win over Xavier.

GW 77, Xavier 74 – February 27, 1999
With the Atlantic 10 West Division Title on the line in the final game of the regular season, the Colonials hosted the Xavier Musketeers. Seniors Shawnta Rogers and Yegor Mescheriakov were playing their final home games. Despite missing a game-winning three with five seconds left Rogers received a pass following a Mike King rebound and broke the 74–74 tie as time expired to win the game and the division. The Colonials would later receive an at-large bid to the NCAA Tournament under first-year coach Tom Penders.

GW 96, No. 11 Michigan State 83 – December 4, 2004
GW 101, No. 12 Maryland 92 – December 5, 2004
In the 2004 BB&T Championship, the Colonials upset ranked teams on two consecutive days, winning each by at least 9 points. Karl Hobbs guided his team to wins over the Michigan State Spartans and Maryland Terrapins. Pops Mensah-Bonsu scored 23 points in the first game and T.J. Thompson poured in 27 against the Terrapins for the Colonials. The next week, the Colonials entered both national polls for the first time in six years.

GW 76, Saint Joseph’s 67 – March 12, 2005
The Colonials clinched their first-ever Atlantic 10 Tournament title in 2005 behind 20 points from Omar Williams. The Colonials were given a 12th seed and faced Georgia Tech in the first round of the NCAA Tournament.

No. 6 GW 86, Charlotte 85 (OT) – March 4, 2006
The sixth-ranked Colonials secured a perfect Atlantic 10 record and Charles E. Smith Center record when Carl Elliott tipped-in an errant Noel Wilmore three-point shot to finish a 26–1 regular season, solidifying the nation's best record, and the best regular season record in Colonials history.

(8) GW 88, (9) UNC-Wilmington 85 (OT) – March 16, 2006 After drawing a surprising 8-seed following its 26–1 regular season campaign and reaching as high as 6th in the nation, the Colonials were sent to take on UNC-Wilmington in nearby Greensboro, North Carolina. Pops Mensah-Bonsu returned from a meniscus injury and helped the Colonials overcome an 18-point second half deficit to take on top-seeded Duke in the second round of the 2006 tournament.

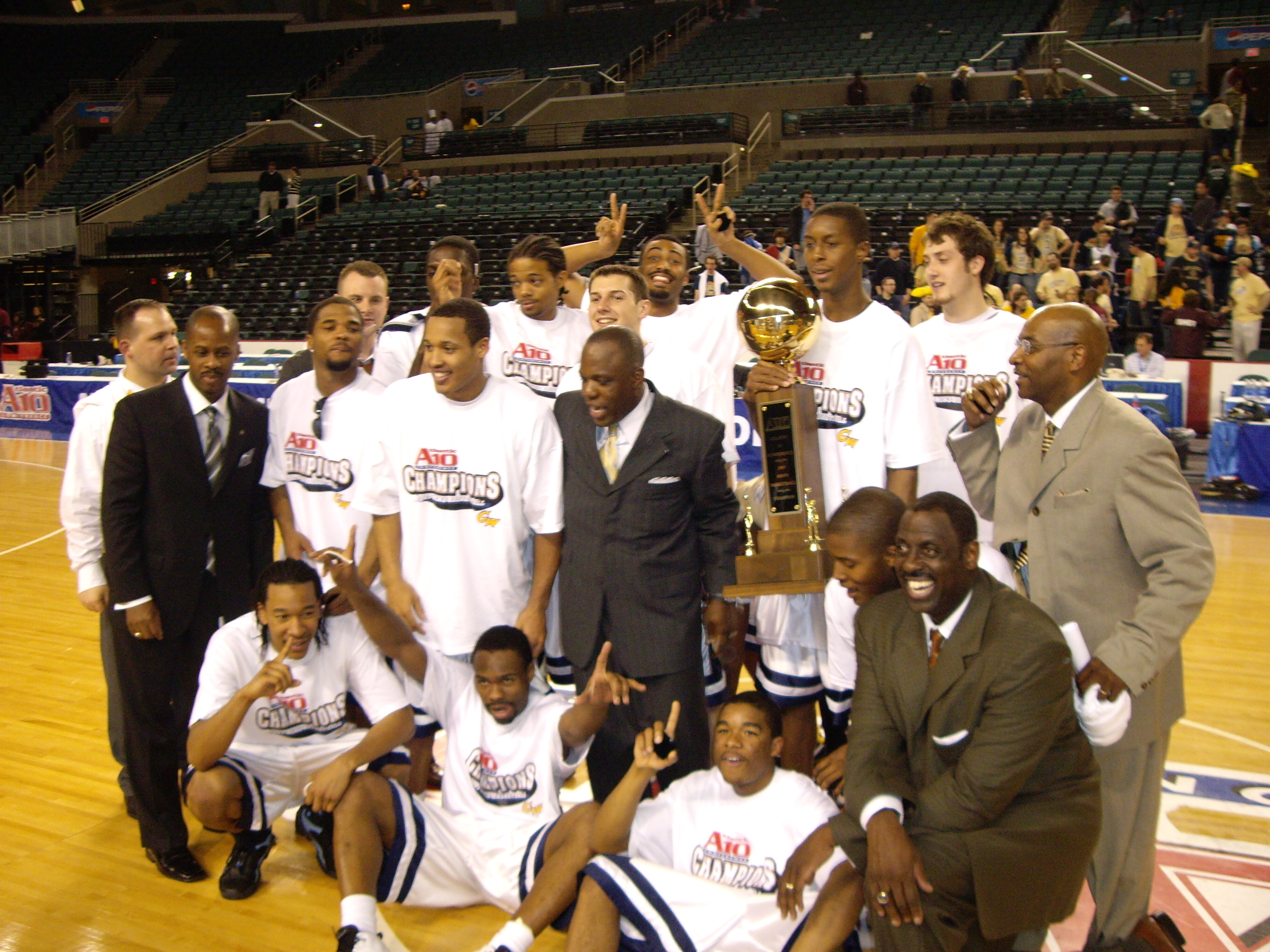
After winning the 2007 A-10 Championship

GW 78, Rhode Island 69 – March 10, 2007
The Colonials controlled the entire second half in winning their second Atlantic 10 Tournament championship in school history (and second in three years), giving the Colonials their third consecutive NCAA Tournament bid and first time in school history with three consecutive 20-win seasons. The Colonials drew an 11th seed and travelled to Sacramento to play 6th-seeded Vanderbilt.

GW 49, Saint Louis 20 – January 10, 2008
The Colonials held the Saint Louis Billikens to just 20 points for the entire game, which set the record for the lowest point total since the inception of the shot clock in Division I College Basketball. Saint Louis was held to 14.6% shooting for the game, and made only one of nineteen three-point attempts. They had seven points in the first half.

GW 66, Memphis 71 – March 21, 2014
The Colonials drew the Memphis Tigers in the East Regional of the NCAA Tournament. The game was held in Raleigh, NC. The Colonials trailed Memphis for the bulk of the game but had two shots to tie in the final minute that didn't connect leaving them with a loss in their first NCAA Tournament Appearance since 2007.

GW 73, No. 6 Virginia 68 − November 16, 2015
Hosting UVA a year after losing 59–42 in Charlottesville, the Colonials held a lead for most of the game and knocked off Virginia for their first win over a top 10 team since defeating UMass 20 years prior. It was the third straight year GW had beaten a ranked team, and a sold-out crowd at the Smith Center stormed the court as GW pulled off the upset. Patricio Garino led GW with 18 points and had many key buckets to spur momentum the Colonial's way.

(4) GW 76, (1) Valparaiso 60 – March 31, 2016
The Colonials made their way through the NIT tournament as a 4 seed by beating 3 higher seeds than them. They won their first National Invitation Tournament and first postseason title starting 3 foreign players and player of the tournament Tyler Cavanaugh. GW set a new school record with 28 wins with this game.

== Notable alumni ==
=== Revolutionaries in the NBA ===
- Yuta Watanabe – Attended GW 2014–18, Memphis Grizzlies 2018–20, Toronto Raptors 2020–22, Brooklyn Nets 2022–23, Phoenix Suns 2023–24, Memphis Grizzlies 2024
- Tyler Cavanaugh – Attended GW 2015–17, Atlanta Hawks 2017–18, Utah Jazz 2018–19
- Patricio Garino – Attended GW 2012–16, Orlando Magic 2017
- Pops Mensah-Bonsu – Attended GW 2002–06, Played in the NBA and represented Great Britain in the 2012 Olympics
- Mike Hall – Attended GW 2002–06, Washington Wizards 2006–07
- Yinka Dare – Attended GW 1992–94, New Jersey Nets 1994–98
- Mike Brown – Attended GW 1981–85, Chicago Bulls 1986–88, Utah Jazz 1988–93, Minnesota Timberwolves 1993–95, Philadelphia 76ers 1995–96, Phoenix Suns 1996–97
- Gene Guarilia – Attended GW 1956–58, Boston Celtics 1959–63
- Joe Holup – Syracuse Nationals 1956–58, Detroit Pistons 1957–59
- Corky Devlin – Fort Wayne Pistons 1955–57, Minneapolis Lakers 1957–58

=== Other Revolutionaries of note ===
- Brendan Adams (born 2000) - basketball player in the Israeli Basketball Premier League
- Red Auerbach — Legendary coach and executive with the Boston Celtics. Inducted into the Basketball Hall of Fame in 1969.
- Mike Brey – Former head men's basketball coach at University of Notre Dame. Currently an assistant coach for the Atlanta Hawks. Team captain of the Colonials for 1981–82 season.
- SirValiant Brown – professional player, ranked second in NCAA Division I in scoring in the 1999–2000 season.
- Joe Dooley – Former head men's basketball coach at Florida Gulf Coast University.
- Moti Daniel (born 1963) – Israeli, played in the Israeli Basketball Premier League and for the Israel national basketball team
- Kevin Peter Hall – 7'2" player who later went on to a successful acting career.
- Mike Hall, professional basketball player with Maccabi Ashdod B.C. in Israel.
- Rasheed Hazzard – Assistant coach for the NBA's New York Knicks.
- Mike King – A 6'4" guard who had a great freshman year en route to Atlantic 10 All-Rookie Team honors, in spite of becoming eligible mid season. King was part of the 1999 regular season champions. He then went on to having a successful basketball career in Europe playing for 11 years before retirement.
- Ricky Lindo (born 2000) - American-Panamanian basketball player in the Israeli Basketball Premier League
- Chris Monroe – GW's all-time leading scorer – A-10 Legend Inductee 2016 – GW Hall Of Fame Inductee 2012 – Retired European professional player – Currently the Director Of Marketing and Sales at George Washington University.
- J. R. Pinnock – Drafted in the second round of the 2006 NBA draft.
- Shawnta Rogers – A 5' 4" guard who led the nation in steals his senior season and won Atlantic 10 Player of the Year. He enjoyed a successful European career.
- Walter Szczerbiak (not to be confused with his son Wally) — Three-time European Champions Cup winner with Real Madrid. Chosen in 2008 as one of the 50 Greatest Euroleague Contributors, the 50 most notable players, coaches, and officials in the first 50 years of the European Champions Cup and its current incarnation, the Euroleague.
- Yuta Watanabe – First Colonial to be named A-10 Defensive Player of the Year
- Matt Zunic – Former head coach at Boston University and the University of Massachusetts.
