= 2009–10 Morgan State Bears basketball team =

American college basketball season

2009–10 Morgan State Bears men's basketball
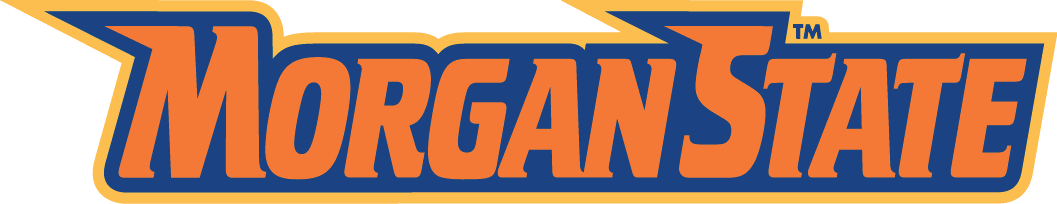

MEAC Regular Season and Tournament Champions

NCAA tournament, Round of 64
- Conference: Mid-Eastern Athletic Conference
- Record: 27–10 (15–1 MEAC)
- Head coach: Todd Bozeman (4th season)
- Assistant coaches: Kevin McClain; Keith Goodie
- Home arena: Talmadge L. Hill Field House

2009–10 MEAC men's basketball standings
	Conf.				Overall
Team	W		L	PCT	W		L	PCT
Morgan State †	15	–	1	.938	24	–	10	.706
Delaware State	11	–	5	.688	16	–	11	.593
South Carolina State	10	–	6	.625	16	–	13	.552
Norfolk State	9	–	7	.563	11	–	18	.379
Hampton	8	–	8	.500	13	–	17	.433
Maryland Eastern Shore	8	–	8	.500	10	–	20	.333
Bethune–Cookman	7	–	9	.438	16	–	15	.516
Howard	6	–	10	.375	7	–	24	.226
North Carolina A&T	6	–	10	.375	10	–	21	.323
Florida A&M	5	–	11	.313	9	–	21	.300
Coppin St.	3	–	13	.188	8	–	21	.276
† 2010 MEAC tournament winner As of March 19, 2010; Rankings from AP Poll

The 2009–10 Morgan State Bears men's basketball team represented Morgan State University in the 2009–10 college basketball season. This was head coach Todd Bozeman's fourth season at Morgan State. The Bears competed in the Mid-Eastern Athletic Conference and played their home games at Talmadge L. Hill Field House. They finished the season 27–10, 15–1 in MEAC play to win the regular season championship. They also won the 2010 MEAC men's basketball tournament for the second consecutive year to receive the conferences automatic bid to the 2010 NCAA Division I men's basketball tournament. They earned a 15 seed in the East Region where they lost to 2 seed and AP #6 West Virginia in the first round.

== Roster ==
#	Name	Height	Weight (lbs.)	Position	Class	Hometown	Previous Team(s)
1	Adam Braswell	6'1"	185	G	Fr.	Burlington, NJ, U.S.	Notre Dame Prep
2	Gene Johnson	6'7"	220	F	Sr.	Hagerstown, MD, U.S.	St. Maria Goretti HS
3	Danny Smith	5'11"	190	G	Jr.	Baltimore, MD, U.S.	Woodlawn HS
4	Anthony Anderson	6'10"	235	F	Fr.	St. Charles, MD, U.S.	La Plata HS
5	Jarrod Denard	6'2"	185	G	Fr.	Philadelphia, PA, U.S.	Freire Charter School
11	Reggie Holmes	6'4"	180	G	Sr.	Baltimore, MD, U.S.	St. Frances Academy
13	Sean Thomas	6'1"	185	G	So.	Clinton, MD, U.S.	Gwynn Park HS
21	Joe Davis	6'0"	180	G	Jr.	Warrensville Heights, OH, U.S.	Warrensville Heights HS
23	Troy Smith	6'4"	195	G	Sr.	Baltimore, MD, U.S.	Douglass HS; Northeast JC (CO)
32	DeWayne Jackson	6'8"	210	F	Fr.	Bowie, MD, U.S.	Bowie HS
33	Kevin Thompson	6'9"	240	F	So.	Baltimore, MD, U.S.	Walbrook HS
34	Ameer Ali	6'4"	230	F	So.	Philadelphia, PA, U.S.	Progressive Christian Academy
42	Rodney Stokes	6'10"	225	F	Jr.	Glen Burnie, MD, U.S.	Old Mill HS
44	John Long	6'5"	210	F	Sr.	Hagerstown, MD, U.S.	South Hagerstown HS; Hagerstown CC
53	Buford Foote	6'9"	210	C	Sr.	Atlanta, GA, U.S.	Stone Mountain HS; Pensacola JC

== Schedule and results ==
Date time, TV	Rank^{#}	Opponent^{#}	Result	Record	Site (attendance) city, state
Regular Season
11/13/2009*; 7:00pm		at Albany	W 69–65	1–0	SEFCU Arena (3,434); Albany, NY
11/15/2009*; 3:30pm		at UMBC	W 80–58	2–0	Retriever Activities Center (2,440); Baltimore, MD
11/19/2009*; 7:00pm		East Tennessee State	W 72–61	3–0	Hill Field House (1,032); Baltimore, MD
11/22/2009*; 1:00pm		at No. 20 Louisville	L 81–90	3–1	Freedom Hall (18,942); Louisville, KY
11/24/2009*; 8:00pm		at Arkansas	W 97–94	4–1	Bud Walton Arena (13,599); Fayetteville, AR
11/28/2009*; 7:00pm		at Appalachian State	L 92–93 ^{OT}	4–2	Holmes Convocation Center (1,576); Boone, NC
12/1/2009*; 7:30pm, MASN		at Loyola (MD)	W 78–66	4–3	Reitz Arena (1,475); Baltimore, MD
12/5/2009; 7:30pm		at Coppin State	W 80–67	5–3 (1–0)	Coppin Center (3,189); Baltimore, MD
12/8/2009*; 7:00pm		at Minnesota	L 64–94	5–4	Williams Arena (11,007); Minneapolis, MN
12/12/2009*; 4:00pm		Manhattan	W 83–74	6–4	Hill Field House (2,113); Baltimore, MD
12/22/2009*; 7:00pm		Towson	W 87–80	7–4	Hill Field House (988); Baltimore, MD
12/29/2009*; 6:00pm		vs. Eastern Kentucky; Dr. Pepper Classic	L 62–76	7–5	McKenzie Arena; Chattanooga, TN
12/30/2009*; 6:00pm		vs. Long Island; Dr. Pepper Classic	W 87–70	8–5	McKenzie Arena; Chattanooga, TN
1/4/2010*; 7:00pm		at Robert Morris	L 75–78	8–6	Charles L. Sewall Center (648); Pittsburgh, PA
1/6/2010*; 8:00pm		at Baylor	L 63–79	8–7	Ferrell Center (5,187); Waco, TX
1/9/2010; 4:00pm		at Howard	W 90–58	9–7 (2–0)	Burr Gymnasium (513); Washington, DC
1/11/2010; 7:30pm		at Hampton	W 73–63	10–7 (3–0)	Hampton Convocation Center (5,668); Hampton, VA
1/16/2010; 7:00pm, ESPN2		at South Carolina State	W 72–67	11–7 (4–0)	SHM Memorial Center (1,321); Orangeburg, SC
1/18/2010*; 7:30pm		at Winston-Salem State	W 84–65	12–7	C. E. Gaines Center (2,013); Winston-Salem, NC
1/23/2010; 4:00pm		Delaware State	W 72–62	13–7 (5–0)	Hill Field House (2,472); Baltimore, MD
1/25/2010; 7:30pm		Maryland Eastern Shore	W 88–71	14–7 (6–0)	Hill Field House (3,109); Baltimore, MD
1/31/2010; 2:00pm		at Norfolk State	W 100–94 ^{OT}	15–7 (7–0)	Joseph G. Echols Memorial Hall (589); Norfolk, VA
2/1/2010; 8:00pm		at North Carolina A&T	W 74–65	16–7 (8–0)	Corbett Sports Center (1,564); Greensboro, NC
2/6/2010; 4:00pm		Florida A&M	W 94–68	17–7 (9–0)	Hill Field House (179); Baltimore, MD
2/8/2010; 7:30pm		Bethune–Cookman	W 48–47	18–7 (10–0)	Hill Field House (791); Baltimore, MD
2/13/2010*; 4:00pm		Winston-Salem State	W 79–65	19–7	Hill Field House (1,137); Baltimore, MD
2/15/2010; 7:00pm, ESPNU		South Carolina State	L 68–71	19–8 (10–1)	Hill Field House (2,709); Baltimore, MD
2/17/2010; 7:00pm		at Delaware State	W 68–65	20–8 (11–1)	Memorial Hall (1,379); Dover, DE
2/20/2010*; 12:00pm, ESPNU		at Murray State; ESPN BracketBusters	L 66–75	20–9	RSEC (5,125); Murray, KY
2/22/2010; 7:30pm		at Maryland Eastern Shore	W 65–61	21–9 (12–1)	Hytche Athletic Center (3,007); Princess Anne, MD
2/27/2010; 4:00pm		Norfolk State	W 88–87 ^{2OT}	22–9 (13–1)	Hill Field House (3,654); Baltimore, MD
3/1/2010; 7:00pm, ESPNU		North Carolina A&T	W 81–67	23–9 (14–1)	Hill Field House (3,651); Baltimore, MD
3/4/2010; 7:30pm		Coppin State	W 74–54r	24–9 (15–1)	Hill Field House (4,550); Baltimore, MD
MEAC tournament
3/10/2010; 7:00pm	(1)	vs. (9) North Carolina A&T; MEAC Quarterfinals	W 84–57	25–9	Lawrence Joel Veterans Memorial Coliseum; Winston-Salem, NC
3/12/2010; 6:00pm	(1)	vs. (5) Hampton; MEAC Semifinals	W 74–67	26–9	Lawrence Joel Veterans Memorial Coliseum; Winston-Salem, NC
3/13/2010; 2:00pm, ESPN2	(1)	vs. (3) South Carolina State; MEAC Championship Game	W 68–67	27–9	Lawrence Joel Veterans Memorial Coliseum; Winston-Salem, NC
NCAA tournament
3/19/2010*; 12:15pm, CBS	(15 E)	vs. (2 E) No. 6 West Virginia; NCAA First Round	L 50–77	27–10	HSBC Arena (18,653); Buffalo, NY
*Non-conference game. ^{#}Rankings from AP Poll. (#) Tournament seedings in parentheses. E=NCAA East Regional. All times are in Eastern Time. Source
