= 1995–96 Purdue Boilermakers men's basketball team =

American college basketball season

1995–96 Purdue Boilermakers men's basketball

Big Ten Regular season champions (Note: Despite NCAA changes in official win–loss results, the Big Ten conference allowed Purdue to retain its season champion title.)

NCAA tournament, second round
- Conference: Big Ten Conference

Ranking
- Coaches: No. 15
- AP: No. 4 т
- Record: 26–6 (Note: Adjusted from 26–6 overall (15–3 conference): in 1999 Purdue retroactively forfeited 18 wins and vacated 2 games for using an ineligible player.) (15–3 Big Ten)
- Head coach: Gene Keady (16th season)
- Assistant coaches: Frank Kendrick; Bruce Weber
- Home arena: Mackey Arena

1995–96 Big Ten Conference men's basketball standings
| | Conf. | | | | Overall |
| Team | W | | L | PCT | W | | L | PCT |
|---|---|---|---|---|---|---|---|---|
| Indiana (Note: Indiana adjusted from 12–6, 19–12) | 13 | – | 5 | .722 | 20 | – | 11 | .645 |
| No. 18 Penn State | 12 | – | 6 | .667 | 21 | – | 7 | .750 |
| No. 21 Iowa (Note: Iowa adjusted from 11–7, 23–9) | 12 | – | 6 | .667 | 24 | – | 8 | .750 |
| Minnesota (Note: Minnesota adjusted from 10–8, 19–13 (vacated 2 games)) | 11 | – | 7 | .611 | 20 | – | 10 | .667 |
| Wisconsin (Note: Wisconsin adjusted from 8–10, 17–15) | 9 | – | 9 | .500 | 18 | – | 14 | .563 |
| Michigan State | 9 | – | 9 | .500 | 16 | – | 16 | .500 |
| Illinois | 7 | – | 11 | .389 | 18 | – | 13 | .581 |
| No. 4 Purdue (Note: Purdue adjusted from 15–3, 26–6 (forfeit 18 wins, vacated 2 games)) | 6 | – | 12 | .333 | 7 | – | 23 | .233 |
| Ohio State (Note: Ohio State adjusted from 3–15, 10–17) | 5 | – | 13 | .278 | 12 | – | 15 | .444 |
| Northwestern (Note: Northwestern adjusted from 2–16, 7–20) | 4 | – | 14 | .222 | 9 | – | 18 | .333 |
| Michigan (Note: Michigan adjusted from 10–8/21–11 (vacated 21 games)) | 1 | – | 8 | .111 | 1 | – | 10 | .091 |
Rankings from AP Poll; Records above are after NCAA sanctions against Minnesota, Purdue, and Michigan as noted:

The 1995–96 Purdue Boilermakers men's basketball team represented Purdue University as a member of the Big Ten Conference during the 1995–96 NCAA Division I men's basketball season. The team was led by Gene Keady and played its home games at Mackey Arena.

== Roster ==
1995–96 Purdue Boilermakers men's basketball team
Players
Coaches

| Pos. | # | Name | Height | Weight | Year | Previous school | Hometown |
|---|---|---|---|---|---|---|---|
| G | 3 | Chad Austin | 6 ft 2 in (1.88 m) | 190 lb (86 kg) | So | | Richmond, Indiana |
| C | 14 | Matt ten Dam | 7 ft 2 in (2.18 m) | 285 lb (129 kg) | So | | Almelo, Holland |
| G | 15 | Alan Eldridge | 6 ft 1 in (1.85 m) | 195 lb (88 kg) | Fr | | Fort Wayne, Indiana |
| G | 20 | Todd Foster | 6 ft 1 in (1.85 m) | 195 lb (88 kg) | Sr | | Washington, Illinois |
| F | 21 | Herb Dove | 6 ft 5 in (1.96 m) | 175 lb (79 kg) | Sr | | Indianapolis, Indiana |
| G | 23 | Porter Roberts | 6 ft 3 in (1.91 m) | 175 lb (79 kg) | Sr | | Chattanooga, Tennessee |
| F | 25 | Roy Hairston | 6 ft 7 in (2.01 m) | 215 lb (98 kg) | Sr | | Jersey City, New Jersey |
| F | 31 | David Lesmond | 6 ft 8 in (2.03 m) | 205 lb (93 kg) | So | | Pierrefitte, France |
| F | 33 | Justin Jennings | 6 ft 6 in (1.98 m) | 200 lb (91 kg) | Sr | Central | Grand Rapids, Michigan |
| C | 34 | Luther Clay | 6 ft 9 in (2.06 m) | 210 lb (95 kg) | Fr | | Oberlin, Ohio |
| F | 42 | Brandon Brantley | 6 ft 8 in (2.03 m) | 203 lb (92 kg) | Sr | | East Chicago, Indiana |
| F | 52 | Brad Miller | 6 ft 11 in (2.11 m) | 235 lb (107 kg) | So | East Noble | Kendallville, Indiana |
| F | 55 | Paul Gilvydis | 6 ft 9 in (2.06 m) | 225 lb (102 kg) | Jr | Harrison | Farmington Hills, Michigan |

Head coach

- Gene Keady (Kansas State)

Assistant coach(es)

- Frank Kendrick (Purdue)
- Bruce Weber (Milwaukee)
- Jay Price

Legend

- (C) Team captain
- (S) Suspended
- (I) Ineligible
- (W) Walk-on
- Injured
- Current redshirt

== Schedule and results ==
| Date time, TV | Rank^{#} | Opponent^{#} | Result | Record | Site city, state |
Non-conference regular season
| Nov 25, 1995* | No. 24 | vs. No. 12 Memphis; BCA Classic | L 76–91 | 0–1 | Kemper Arena; Kansas City, Missouri |
| Nov 29, 1995* | | at Central Michigan | W 78–76 | 1–1 | Rose Arena; Mount Pleasant, Michigan |
| Dec 1, 1995* | | UIC; Boilermaker Invitational | W 78–67 | 2–1 | Mackey Arena; West Lafayette, Indiana |
| Dec 2, 1995* | | Murray State; Boilermaker Invitational | W 88–76 | 3–1 | Mackey Arena; West Lafayette, Indiana |
| Dec 6, 1995* | | Oklahoma | W 77–63 | 4–1 | Mackey Arena; West Lafayette, Indiana |
| Dec 9, 1995* | | vs. No. 2 Villanova; Wooden Classic | L 50–67 | 4–2 | Honda Center; Anaheim, California |
| Dec 16, 1995* | | vs. TCU; Boilermaker Blockbuster | W 88–69 | 5–2 | Indianapolis, Indiana |
| Dec 19, 1995* | | Western Michigan | W 86–56 | 6–2 | Mackey Arena; West Lafayette, Indiana |
| Dec 21, 1995* | | Valparaiso | W 74–53 | 7–2 | Mackey Arena; West Lafayette, Indiana |
| Dec 23, 1995* | | at Seton Hall | W 78–76 | 8–2 | Brendan Byrne Arena; East Rutherford, New Jersey |
| Dec 28, 1995* | | vs. Iowa State; Puerto Rico Invitational | W 79–60 | 9–2 | Eugene Guerra Sports Complex; Bayamón, Puerto Rico |
| Dec 30, 1995* | | vs. UNC Charlotte; Puerto Rico Invitational | W 73–67 | 10–2 | Eugene Guerra Sports Complex; Bayamón, Puerto Rico |
Big Ten regular season
| Jan 3, 1996 | | No. 10 Iowa | W 85–61 | 11–2 (1–0) | Mackey Arena; West Lafayette, Indiana |
| Jan 10, 1996 | No. 22 | at Northwestern | W 67–51 | 12–2 (2–0) | Welsh-Ryan Arena; Evanston, Illinois |
| Jan 13, 1996 | No. 22 | at Minnesota | W 76–62 | 13–2 (3–0) | Williams Arena; Minneapolis, Minnesota |
| Jan 16, 1996 | No. 17 | Indiana | W 74–69 | 14–2 (4–0) | Mackey Arena; West Lafayette, Indiana |
| Jan 20, 1996 | No. 17 | Illinois | L 67–71 | 14–3 (4–1) | Mackey Arena; West Lafayette, Indiana |
| Jan 24, 1996 | No. 19 | at No. 14 Penn State | L 77–87 | 14–4 (4–2) | Bryce Jordan Center; University Park, Pennsylvania |
| Jan 27, 1996 | No. 19 | Ohio State | W 70–53 | 15–4 (5–2) | Mackey Arena; West Lafayette, Indiana |
| Jan 31, 1996 | No. 17 | at No. 20 Michigan | W 80–59 | 16–4 (6–2) | Crisler Arena; Ann Arbor, Michigan |
| Feb 3, 1996 | No. 17 | Michigan State | W 56–51 | 17–4 (7–2) | Mackey Arena; West Lafayette, Indiana |
| Feb 7, 1996 | No. 14 | at Wisconsin | W 75–42 | 18–4 (8–2) | Wisconsin Field House; Madison, Wisconsin |
| Feb 10, 1996 | No. 14 | No. 23 Michigan | W 69–64 | 19–4 (9–2) | Mackey Arena; West Lafayette, Indiana |
| Feb 15, 1996 | No. 11 | at Ohio State | W 63–55 | 20–4 (10–2) | St. John Arena; Columbus, Ohio |
| Feb 17, 1996 | No. 11 | No. 9 Penn State | W 66–49 | 21–4 (11–2) | Mackey Arena; West Lafayette, Indiana |
| Feb 20, 1996 | No. 7 | at Illinois | W 74–71 | 22–4 (12–2) | Assembly Hall; Champaign, Illinois |
| Feb 25, 1996 | No. 7 | at Indiana | W 74–72 | 23–4 (13–2) | Assembly Hall; Bloomington, Indiana |
| Feb 29, 1996 | No. 5 | Minnesota | W 67–61 | 24–4 (14–2) | Mackey Arena; West Lafayette, Indiana |
| Mar 2, 1996 | No. 5 | Northwestern | W 79–56 | 25–4 (15–2) | Mackey Arena; West Lafayette, Indiana |
| Mar 9, 1996 | No. 4 | at Iowa | L 52–56 | 25–5 (15–3) | Carver–Hawkeye Arena; Iowa City, Iowa |
NCAA tournament
| Mar 14, 1996* | (1 W) No. 4 | vs. (16 W) Western Carolina; First round | W 73–71 | 26–5 | The Pit; Albuquerque, New Mexico |
| Mar 16, 1996* | (1 W) No. 4 | vs. (8 W) Georgia; Second round | L 69–76 | 26–6 | The Pit; Albuquerque, New Mexico |
*Non-conference game. ^{#}Rankings from AP Poll. (#) Tournament seedings in parentheses. W=West. All times are in Eastern.

== Rankings ==
Ranking movements Legend: ██ Increase in ranking ██ Decrease in ranking — = Not ranked т = Tied with team above or below
| | Week | | | | | | | | | | | | | | | | | | |
| Poll | Pre | 1 | 2 | 3 | 4 | 5 | 6 | 7 | 8 | 9 | 10 | 11 | 12 | 13 | 14 | 15 | 16 | 17 | Final |
|---|---|---|---|---|---|---|---|---|---|---|---|---|---|---|---|---|---|---|---|
| AP | 24 | 24 | — | — | — | — | — | — | 22 | 17 | 19 | 17 | 14 | 11 | 7 | 5 | 4 | 4т | Not released |
| Coaches | 23 | 25 | — | — | — | — | — | — | 25 | 18 | 19 | 15 | 13 | 11 | 7 | 5 | 4 | 4 | 15 |

== NCAA infractions ==
In 1997 the NCAA began investigating claims of recruiting infractions by Purdue. The Committee on Infractions alleged that assistant coach and top recruiter Frank Kendrick and Purdue booster Bill Powers arranged for a loan of $4,000 in 1995 to recruit Luther Clay. Clay's understanding was that he did not need to pay back the loan, and records show that no attempt was made to recover it. Additionally, Kendrick arranged for a booster to provide housing and transportation for former Boilermaker Porter Roberts' mother. Both claims are denied by Purdue (in the latter case specifically, that the booster was not a Purdue booster, and therefore allowed to provide services as he saw fit). Furthermore, the committee discovered that Kendrick made 15 calls to Jamaal Davis in 1996 and told him to lie about an improper ride he received during a campus visit. Davis signed with Purdue for the 1997–98 but didn't play his freshman year due to academic ineligibility. He would go on to play 12 games the following year before transferring to Cincinnati in 1999.

In 1999 the NCAA Division I Committee on Infractions ruled that Purdue had violated laws involving recruiting, extra benefits, and ethical conduct, as well as several secondary violations in the women's basketball program. As a result, Purdue was to repay approximately $80,000 (reduced from around $900,000) in earnings it received from their 1996 NCAA tournament appearance. Purdue received two years probation and dissociation of 2 representatives of the university athletic interests and Kendrick was banned from off-campus recruiting for a year. The basketball program was to reduce the number of official recruiting visits from 12 to 4 per year for the 1999–2000 and 2000–01 seasons, and lost one scholarship (limiting them to 12 per season) for the 2000–01 and 2001–02 academic years. Kendrick was fined an undisclosed amount and was subject to an NCAA "show-cause" requirement for 1 year. Finally, Purdue was forced to forfeit the 24 games in which Luther Clay participated (18 regular season wins) and vacate its 2 NCAA games (1 win and 1 loss). The forfeited games would be recorded as losses for Purdue and wins for their opponent, whereas the vacated games would simply remove the result from Purdue's record with no change to the opponent's. The forfeits were among the steepest at the time. The Big Ten conference allowed Purdue to retain their title as regular season champions despite the change in conference records.

Purdue maintains that none of Clay's on-court actions affected game outcomes, scoring only 60 points the entire season, including 13 points in 12 conference games. Clay would transfer to Rhode Island after one season with Purdue. Kendrick left the Purdue basketball program in 1999. The Big Ten had multiple basketball scandals around this time, including the University of Michigan basketball scandal and the University of Minnesota basketball scandal.

== See also ==
- 1996 NCAA Division I men's basketball tournament
- List of NCAA Division I institutions
