= 1995–96 Iowa Hawkeyes men's basketball team =

American college basketball season

1995–96 Iowa Hawkeyes men's basketball

Super Chevy Shootout champion

NCAA men's Division I tournament, Round of 32
- Conference: Big Ten Conference

Ranking
- Coaches: No. 22
- AP: No. 21
- Record: 24–8 (12–6 Big Ten)
- Head coach: Tom Davis (10th season)
- Assistant coach: Gary Close
- MVPs: Jess Settles; Andre Woolridge; Russ Millard
- Home arena: Carver-Hawkeye Arena

1995–96 Big Ten Conference men's basketball standings
	Conf.				Overall
Team	W		L	PCT	W		L	PCT
Indiana (Note: Indiana adjusted from 12–6, 19–12)	13	–	5	.722	20	–	11	.645
No. 18 Penn State	12	–	6	.667	21	–	7	.750
No. 21 Iowa (Note: Iowa adjusted from 11–7, 23–9)	12	–	6	.667	24	–	8	.750
Minnesota (Note: Minnesota adjusted from 10–8, 19–13 (vacated 2 games))	11	–	7	.611	20	–	10	.667
Wisconsin (Note: Wisconsin adjusted from 8–10, 17–15)	9	–	9	.500	18	–	14	.563
Michigan State	9	–	9	.500	16	–	16	.500
Illinois	7	–	11	.389	18	–	13	.581
No. 4 Purdue (Note: Purdue adjusted from 15–3, 26–6 (forfeit 18 wins, vacated 2 games))	6	–	12	.333	7	–	23	.233
Ohio State (Note: Ohio State adjusted from 3–15, 10–17)	5	–	13	.278	12	–	15	.444
Northwestern (Note: Northwestern adjusted from 2–16, 7–20)	4	–	14	.222	9	–	18	.333
Michigan (Note: Michigan adjusted from 10–8/21–11 (vacated 21 games))	1	–	8	.111	1	–	10	.091
Rankings from AP Poll; Records above are after NCAA sanctions against Minnesota, Purdue, and Michigan as noted:

The 1995–96 Iowa Hawkeyes men's basketball team represented the University of Iowa as members of the Big Ten Conference. The team was led by 10th year head coach Tom Davis, and played their home games at Carver-Hawkeye Arena. They finished the season 24–8 overall and 12–6 in Big Ten play. The Hawkeyes received an at-large bid to the NCAA tournament as #6 seed in the West Region.

== Roster ==
1995–96 Iowa Hawkeyes men's basketball team
Players
Coaches

Pos.	#	Name	Height	Weight	Year	Hometown
G	3	Kenyon Murray	6 ft 5 in (1.96 m)	—	Sr	Battle Creek, Michigan
F	4	Jess Settles	6 ft 7 in (2.01 m)	—	Jr	Winfield, Iowa
PG	15	Andre Woolridge	6 ft 0 in (1.83 m)	190 lb (86 kg)	Jr	Omaha, Nebraska
G	13	Mon'ter Glasper	5 ft 11 in (1.8 m)	—	Sr	Albion, Michigan
G	14	Chris Kingsbury	6 ft 5 in (1.96 m)	—	Jr	Hamilton, Ohio
G	32	Kent McCausland	6 ft 3 in (1.91 m)	—	Fr	Waterloo, Iowa
PF	42	Ryan Bowen	6 ft 9 in (2.06 m)	—	So	Fort Madison, Iowa
F	44	J. R. Koch	6 ft 10 in (2.08 m)	—	Fr	Morton, Illinois
G	45	Darryl Moore	6 ft 2 in (1.88 m)	—	So	Chicago, Illinois
F	50	Alvin Robinson	6 ft 9 in (2.06 m)	—	Fr	Chicago, Illinois
F/C	52	Russ Millard	6 ft 8 in (2.03 m)	—	Sr	Cedar Rapids, Iowa
C	55	Greg Helmers	6 ft 10 in (2.08 m)	—	So	Palmer, Iowa

Head coach

- Tom Davis (UW–Platteville)

Assistant coach(es)

- Gary Close (Arizona State)

Legend

- (C) Team captain
- (S) Suspended
- (I) Ineligible
- (W) Walk-on
- Injured
- Current redshirt

== Schedule and results ==
Date time, TV	Rank^{#}	Opponent^{#}	Result	Record	High points	High rebounds	High assists	Site city, state
Non-conference regular season
11/22/1995*	No. 10	vs. Ohio; Great Alaska Shootout	W 78-51	1-0	18 – Millard	13 – Bowen	7 – Glasper	Sullivan Arena (7,863); Anchorage, AK
11/24/1995*	No. 10	vs. No. 6 Connecticut; Great Alaska Shootout Semifinal	W 101-95 ^{OT}	2-0	30 – Kingsbury	7 – Kingsbury	7 – Woolridge	Sullivan Arena (7,863); Anchorage, AK
11/25/1995*	No. 10	vs. Duke; Great Alaska Shootout Final	L 81-88	2-1	16 – Millard, Kingsbury	8 – Murray	5 – Woolridge	Sullivan Arena (7,863); Anchorage, AK
11/28/1995*	No. 11	Drake; Iowa Big Four	W 98-66	3-1	22 – Millard	10 – Millard	8 – Woolridge	Carver-Hawkeye Arena (15,500); Iowa City, IA
12/1/1995*	No. 11	East Tennessee State; Super Chevy Shootout	W 104-58	4-1	17 – Millard	9 – Koch	8 – Settles	Carver-Hawkeye Arena (14,978); Iowa City, IA
12/2/1995*	No. 11	Colgate; Super Chevy Shootout	W 79-59	5-1	14 – Millard	12 – Settles	5 – Woolridge	Carver-Hawkeye Arena (15,147); Iowa City, IA
12/5/1995*	No. 12	at Northern Iowa; Iowa Big Four	W 78-73	6-1	20 – Settles	15 – Settles	5 – Woolridge	UNI-Dome; Cedar Falls, IA
12/9/1995*	No. 12	at Iowa State; Rivalry	W 56-50	7-1	16 – Woolridge	8 – Murray, Millard	5 – Settles	Hilton Coliseum (14,267); Ames, IA
12/16/1995*	No. 9	Texas Southern	W 110-67	8-1	20 – Millard	10 – Millard	6 – Woolridge	Carver-Hawkeye Arena; Iowa City, IA
12/20/1995*	No. 10	Western Illinois	W 93-41	9-1	15 – Settles, Millard	6 – Settles, Murray	7 – Settles	Carver-Hawkeye Arena; Iowa City, IA
12/23/1995*	No. 10	Morehead State	W 82-57	10-1	12 – Millard	17 – Settles	6 – Woolridge	Carver-Hawkeye Arena; Iowa City, IA
12/28/1995*	No. 10	at Colorado	W 100-85	11-1	28 – Millard	10 – Settles	7 – Kingsbury	Coors Events Center (8,953); Boulder, CO
Big Ten Regular Season
1/3/1996	No. 10	at Purdue	L 61-85	11-2 (0-1)	13 – Settles	8 – Millard	7 – Woolridge	Mackey Arena; West Lafayette, IN
1/6/1996	No. 10	Minnesota	W 92-63	12-2 (1-1)	20 – Millard	10 – Millard	9 – Woolridge	Carver-Hawkeye Arena; Iowa City, IA
1/10/1996	No. 11	Ohio State	W 81-53	13-2 (2-1)	20 – Settles	9 – Settles	7 – Woolridge	Carver-Hawkeye Arena; Iowa City, IA
1/13/1996	No. 11	at Wisconsin	L 71-80	13-3 (2-2)	15 – Settles	7 – Millard	3 – Woolridge, Kingsbury	Carver-Hawkeye Arena; Iowa City, IA
1/18/1996	No. 16	Illinois	W 82-79	14-3 (3-2)	19 – Settles	8 – Bowen	6 – Woolridge	Carver-Hawkeye Arena; Iowa City, IA
1/20/1996	No. 16	at Michigan State	L 60-62	14-4 (3-3)	14 – Woolridge, Kingsbury	5 – Glasper	3 – Settles, Woolridge	Breslin Center (14,138); East Lansing, MI
1/28/1996	No. 22	No. 16 Michigan	W 70-61	15-4 (4-3)	28 – Woolridge	5 – Settles, Millard	9 – Settles	Carver-Hawkeye Arena (15,560); Iowa City, IA
1/30/1996	No. 16	at Indiana	L 73-76	15-5 (4-4)	19 – Woolridge	7 – Settles	5 – Woolridge	Assembly Hall; Bloomington, IN
2/3/1996	No. 16	No. 10 Penn State	L 87-95 ^{OT}	15-6 (4-5)	23 – Settles	5 – Settles, Woolridge	7 – Woolridge	Carver-Hawkeye Arena (15,500); Iowa City, IA
2/7/1996	No. 19	at Northwestern	W 88-77	16-6 (5-5)	29 – Settles	8 – Settles	9 – Woolridge	Welsh-Ryan Arena (5,488); Evanston, IL
2/11/1996	No. 19	Indiana	W 76-50	17-6 (6-5)	16 – Murray	11 – Settles	9 – Woolridge	Carver-Hawkeye Arena (15,500); Iowa City, IA
2/13/1996	No. 19	at Michigan	W 62-55	18-6 (7-5)	20 – Woolridge	15 – Millard	6 – Woolridge	Crisler Arena (13,562); Ann Arbor, MI
2/21/1996	No. 18	Michigan State	W 83-47	19-6 (8-5)	17 – Millard	7 – Settles	8 – Woolridge	Carver-Hawkeye Arena (15,500); Iowa City, IA
2/24/1996	No. 18	at Illinois	L 86-91	19-7 (8-6)	17 – Settles	12 – Settles	5 – Settles	Assembly Hall; Champaign, IL
2/28/1996	No. 20	Wisconsin	W 69-54	20-7 (9-6)	25 – Settles	8 – Millard	9 – Woolridge	Carver-Hawkeye Arena (15,500); Iowa City, IA
3/2/1996	No. 20	at Ohio State	W 73-64	21-7 (10-6)	19 – Settles	9 – Millard	8 – Woolridge	St. John Arena; Columbus, OH
3/6/1996	No. 19	at Minnesota	L 64-72	21-8 (10-7)	21 – Settles	6 – Settles	6 – Woolridge	Williams Arena; Minneapolis, MN
3/9/1996	No. 19	No. 4 Purdue	W 56-52	22-8 (11-7)	18 – Settles	8 – Woolridge	8 – Woolridge	Carver-Hawkeye Arena (15,500); Iowa City, IA
NCAA tournament
3/15/1996*	(6 W) No. 21	vs. (11 W) (11) George Washington; West Regional 1st Round	W 81-79	23-8 (11-7)	21 – Settles	15 – Settles	7 – Woolridge	Wells Fargo Arena (12,462); Tempe, AZ
3/17/1996*	(6 W) No. 21	vs. (3 W) No. 11 Arizona; West Regional 2nd Round	L 73-87	23-9 (11-7)	16 – Kingsbury	12 – Settles	7 – Woolridge	Wells Fargo Arena (12,441); Tempe, AZ
*Non-conference game. ^{#}Rankings from AP Poll. (#) Tournament seedings in parentheses. W=West.

== Awards and honors ==
- Jess Settles – Honorable Mention AP All-American; First-Team All-Big Ten
- Andre Woolridge – First-Team All-Big Ten

== Team players in the 1996 NBA draft ==
Round	Pick	Player	NBA club
2	39	Russ Millard	Phoenix Suns
