= 2009–10 MEAC men's basketball season =

- League: NCAA Division I
- Sport: Basketball
- Duration: December 5, 2009 through March 6, 2010
- Teams: 11

Regular Season

Tournament

Basketball seasons
- ← 08–09 10–11 →

2009–10 MEAC men's basketball standings
	Conf.				Overall
Team	W		L	PCT	W		L	PCT
Morgan State †	15	–	1	.938	24	–	10	.706
Delaware State	11	–	5	.688	16	–	11	.593
South Carolina State	10	–	6	.625	16	–	13	.552
Norfolk State	9	–	7	.563	11	–	18	.379
Hampton	8	–	8	.500	13	–	17	.433
Maryland Eastern Shore	8	–	8	.500	10	–	20	.333
Bethune–Cookman	7	–	9	.438	16	–	15	.516
Howard	6	–	10	.375	7	–	24	.226
North Carolina A&T	6	–	10	.375	10	–	21	.323
Florida A&M	5	–	11	.313	9	–	21	.300
Coppin St.	3	–	13	.188	8	–	21	.276
† 2010 MEAC tournament winner As of March 19, 2010; Rankings from AP Poll

The 2009–10 MEAC men's basketball season marked the 39th season of Mid-Eastern Athletic Conference basketball.

== Preseason ==
The MEAC season started on a tragic note, as Hampton captain Theo Smalling was shot and killed in an accidental shooting outside a nightclub. The incident took place on October 24 and Smalling died two days later.

The Mid-Eastern Athletic Conference coaches and sports information directors voted Morgan State the preseason #1 and Norfolk State senior guard Michael DeLoach the preseason player of the year.

=== MEAC Preseason Poll ===
Rank	Team	Votes
1	Morgan State (20)	476
2	South Carolina State	388
3	Norfolk State	310
4	Hampton (1)	305
5	Bethune-Cookman	292
6	North Carolina A&T	258
7	Coppin State	234
8	Florida A&M (1)	154
9	Delaware State	134
10	Howard	104
11	Maryland Eastern Shore	88

=== Preseason All-MEAC Team ===
First team

- Michael DeLoach, Norfolk State
- Reggie Holmes, Morgan State
- Jason Flagler, South Carolina State
- Neal Pitt, Maryland Eastern Shore
- Sam Coleman, Coppin State

Second team

- C. J. Reed, Bethune-Cookman
- Vincent Simpson, Hampton
- Michael Harper, Coppin State
- Kevin Thompson, Morgan State
- Paul Kirkpatrick, Howard

Preseason Player of the Year

- Michael DeLoach, Norfolk State
