= 2008–09 Morgan State Bears basketball team =

American college basketball season

2008–09 Morgan State Bears men's basketball
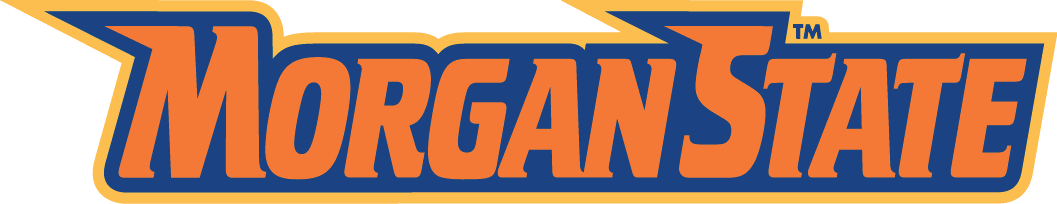

MEAC Regular Season and tournament champions

NCAA tournament, first round
- Conference: Mid-Eastern Athletic Conference
- Record: 23–12 (13–3 MEAC)
- Head coach: Todd Bozeman (3rd season)
- Assistant coaches: Kevin McClain; Keith Goodie
- Home arena: Talmadge L. Hill Field House

2008–09 MEAC men's basketball standings
	Conf.				Overall
Team	W		L	PCT	W		L	PCT
Morgan State †	13	–	3	.813	23	–	12	.657
South Carolina State	10	–	6	.625	17	–	14	.548
Bethune–Cookman	9	–	7	.563	17	–	16	.515
North Carolina A&T	9	–	7	.563	16	–	16	.500
Norfolk State	9	–	7	.563	13	–	18	.419
Coppin State	9	–	7	.563	13	–	19	.406
Hampton	8	–	8	.500	16	–	16	.500
Florida A&M	6	–	10	.375	10	–	21	.323
Howard	6	–	10	.375	8	–	23	.258
Delaware State	6	–	10	.375	8	–	24	.250
Maryland Eastern Shore	3	–	13	.188	7	–	23	.233
Winston-Salem State		–		–	8	–	22	.267
† 2009 MEAC tournament winner Rankings from AP Poll

The 2008–09 Morgan State Bears men's basketball team represented Morgan State University in the 2008–09 college basketball season. This was head coach Todd Bozeman's third season at Morgan State. The Bears competed in the Mid-Eastern Athletic Conference and played their home games at Talmadge L. Hill Field House. They finished the season 23–12, 13–3 in MEAC play to win the regular season championship. They also won the 2009 MEAC men's basketball tournament to receive the conferences automatic bid to the 2009 NCAA Division I men's basketball tournament. They received the No. 15 seed in the South Region where they lost to No. 2 seed and AP #7 Oklahoma in the first round.

== Roster ==
2008–09 Morgan State Bears men's basketball team
Players
Coaches

Pos.	#	Name	Height	Weight	Year	Hometown
G	3	Jermaine Bolden	5 ft 7 in (1.7 m)	175 lb (79 kg)	So	Baltimore, Maryland
G	11	Reggie Holmes	6 ft 4 in (1.93 m)	180 lb (82 kg)	Jr	Baltimore, Maryland
F	32	Marquise Kately	6 ft 5 in (1.96 m)	220 lb (100 kg)	Sr	San Francisco, California
F	33	Kevin Thompson	6 ft 9 in (2.06 m)	240 lb (109 kg)	So	Baltimore, Maryland

Head coach

- Todd Bozeman

Assistant coach(es)

Legend

- (C) Team captain
- (S) Suspended
- (I) Ineligible
- (W) Walk-on
- Injured
- Current redshirt

Roster

== Schedule and results ==
Date time, TV	Rank^{#}	Opponent^{#}	Result	Record	Site (attendance) city, state
Regular season
Nov 15, 2008*		at La Salle	L 61–64	0–1	Tom Gola Arena; Philadelphia, Pennsylvania
Nov 17, 2008*		UMBC	W 67–60	1–1	Hill Field House; Baltimore, Maryland
Nov 19, 2008*		at Manhattan	L 60–61	1–2	Draddy Gymnasium; New York, New York
Nov 21, 2008*		vs. Marshall	W 72–67	2–2	Ocean Center; Daytona Beach, Florida
Nov 22, 2008*		vs. Utah	L 37–66	2–3	Ocean Center; Daytona Beach, Florida
Nov 23, 2008*		vs. Green Bay	L 54–71	2–4	Ocean Center; Daytona Beach, Florida
Nov 29, 2008*		at Ole Miss	L 70–78	2–5	Tad Smith Coliseum; Oxford, Mississippi
Dec 1, 2008*		Saint Francis (PA)	L 61–65	2–6	Hill Field House; Baltimore, Maryland
Dec 6, 2008		Coppin State	W 62–48	3–6 (1–0)	Hill Field House; Baltimore, Maryland
Dec 10, 2008*		at DePaul	W 79–75	4–6	Allstate Arena; Rosemont, Illinois
Dec 27, 2008*		vs. William Jessup	W 70–68	5–6	McKeon Pavilion; Moraga, California
Dec 28, 2008*		at Saint Mary's	L 60–76	5–7	McKeon Pavilion; Moraga, California
Dec 30, 2008*		at Washington	L 67–81	5–8	Bank of America Arena; Seattle, Washington
Jan 7, 2009*		at Maryland	W 66–65	6–8	Comcast Center; College Park, Maryland
Jan 10, 2009		North Carolina A&T	W 73–62	7–8 (2–0)	Hill Field House; Baltimore, Maryland
Jan 12, 2009		Norfolk State	W 74–70	8–8 (3–0)	Hill Field House; Baltimore, Maryland
Jan 17, 2009		at Florida A&M	L 58–63	8–9 (3–1)	Jake Gaither Gymnasium; Tallahassee, Florida
Jan 19, 2009		at Bethune-Cookman	W 78–44	9–9 (4–1)	Moore Gymnasium; Daytona Beach, Florida
Jan 24, 2009		Howard	W 78–56	10–9 (5–1)	Hill Field House; Baltimore, Maryland
Jan 26, 2009		Hampton	L 57–62	10–10 (5–2)	Hill Field House; Baltimore, Maryland
Jan 31, 2009		at Maryland-Eastern Shore	W 87–52	11–10 (6–2)	Hytche Athletic Center; Princess Anne, Maryland
Feb 2, 2009		at Delaware State	W 57–54	12–10 (7–2)	Memorial Hall; Dover, Delaware
Feb 7, 2009*		at Winston-Salem State	W 73–64	13–10	Lawrence Joel Veterans Memorial Coliseum; Winston-Salem, North Carolina
Feb 9, 2009		at South Carolina State	W 66–56	14–10 (8–2)	SHM Memorial Center; Orangeburg, South Carolina
Feb 14, 2009		Florida A&M	W 75–57	15–10 (9–2)	Hill Field House; Baltimore, Maryland
Feb 16, 2009		Bethune-Cookman	W 55–44	16–10 (10–2)	Hill Field House; Baltimore, Maryland
Feb 18, 2009		at Howard	W 74–69	17–10 (11–2)	Burr Gymnasium; Washington, D.C.
Feb 21, 2009*		at Towson	W 80–64	18–10	Towson Center; Towson, Maryland
Feb 23, 2009		at Hampton	L 47–49	18–11 (11–3)	Convocation Center; Hampton, Virginia
Feb 28, 2009		Delaware State	W 64–50	19–11 (12–3)	Hill Field House; Baltimore, Maryland
Mar 5, 2009		at Coppin State	W 68–62	20–11 (13–3)	Coppin Center; Baltimore, Maryland
MEAC tournament
Mar 11, 2009*		vs. Florida A&M; Quarterfinals	W 71–41	21–11	Lawrence Joel Veterans Memorial Coliseum; Winston-Salem, North Carolina
Mar 13, 2009*		vs. Coppin State; Semifinals	W 75–67	22–11	Lawrence Joel Veterans Memorial Coliseum; Winston-Salem, North Carolina
Mar 14, 2009*		vs. Norfolk State; Championship Game	W 83–69	23–11	Lawrence Joel Veterans Memorial Coliseum; Winston-Salem, North Carolina
NCAA tournament
Mar 19, 2009*	(15 S)	vs. (2 S) No. 7 Oklahoma; First Round	L 54–82	23–12	Sprint Center; Kansas City, Missouri
*Non-conference game. ^{#}Rankings from AP poll. (#) Tournament seedings in parentheses. S=South. All times are in Eastern.
