= 1995–96 Michigan State Spartans men's basketball team =

American college basketball season

1995–96 Michigan State Spartans men's basketball

NIT, Second round
- Conference: Big Ten Conference
- Record: 16–16 (9–9 Big Ten)
- Head coach: Tom Izzo (1st season)
- Assistant coaches: Stan Joplin (5th season); Brian Gregory (4th season); Tom Crean (1st season)
- Captains: Quinton Brooks; Jamie Feick
- Home arena: Breslin Center

1995–96 Big Ten Conference men's basketball standings
	Conf.				Overall
Team	W		L	PCT	W		L	PCT
Indiana (Note: Indiana adjusted from 12–6, 19–12)	13	–	5	.722	20	–	11	.645
No. 18 Penn State	12	–	6	.667	21	–	7	.750
No. 21 Iowa (Note: Iowa adjusted from 11–7, 23–9)	12	–	6	.667	24	–	8	.750
Minnesota (Note: Minnesota adjusted from 10–8, 19–13 (vacated 2 games))	11	–	7	.611	20	–	10	.667
Wisconsin (Note: Wisconsin adjusted from 8–10, 17–15)	9	–	9	.500	18	–	14	.563
Michigan State	9	–	9	.500	16	–	16	.500
Illinois	7	–	11	.389	18	–	13	.581
No. 4 Purdue (Note: Purdue adjusted from 15–3, 26–6 (forfeit 18 wins, vacated 2 games))	6	–	12	.333	7	–	23	.233
Ohio State (Note: Ohio State adjusted from 3–15, 10–17)	5	–	13	.278	12	–	15	.444
Northwestern (Note: Northwestern adjusted from 2–16, 7–20)	4	–	14	.222	9	–	18	.333
Michigan (Note: Michigan adjusted from 10–8/21–11 (vacated 21 games))	1	–	8	.111	1	–	10	.091
Rankings from AP Poll; Records above are after NCAA sanctions against Minnesota, Purdue, and Michigan as noted:

The 1995–96 Michigan State Spartans men's basketball team represented Michigan State University in the 1995–96 NCAA Division I men's basketball season. The team played their home games at Breslin Center in East Lansing, Michigan and were members of the Big Ten Conference. They were coached by Tom Izzo in his first year as head coach after 11 years as an assistant coach. The Spartans finished the season with a record of 16–16, 9–9 in Big Ten play to finish in a tie for fifth place. They received a bid to the National Invitation Tournament where they defeated Washington before losing to Fresno State in the second round.

The season marked the last time, as of 2023, that Michigan State did not finish the season with a winning record.

== Previous season ==
The Spartans finished the 1994–95 season with a record of 22–6, 14–4 in Big Ten play to finish in second place. Michigan State received an at-large bid to the NCAA Tournament as the No. 3 seed in the Southeast region where they lost to Weber State in the first round.

== Roster and statistics ==
1995–96 Michigan State Spartans men's basketball team
Name	Class	Pos	Height	Summary
Damion Beathea	SR	F	6'7"	5.9 Pts, 3.1 Reb, 1.0 Ast
Quinton Brooks	SR	F	6'7"	16.3 Pts, 5.6 Reb, 0.6 Ast
Jamie Feick	SR	C	6'9"	10.1 Pts, 9.5 Reb, 2.3 Ast
Jon Garavaglia	JR	F	6'9"	5.1 Pts, 4.5 Reb, 1.1 Ast
David Hart	SR	G	6'4"	0.0 Pts, 0.3 Reb, 0.5 Ast
Thomas Kelley	SO	G	6'2"	5.1 Pts, 2.2 Reb, 3.6 Ast
Jason Klein	FR	G	6'7"	2.1 Pts, 1.1 Reb, 0.3 Ast
Anthony Mull	JR	G	6'4"	2.8 Pts, 1.0 Reb, 0.3 Ast
Steve Nicodemus	SR	G	6'4"	0.7 Pts, 0.4 Reb, 0.1 Ast
Morris Peterson	FR	F	6'7"	0.5 Pts, 0.8 Reb, 0.5 Ast
Steve Polonowski	JR	F	6'9"	0.5 Pts, 0.6 Reb, 0.1 Ast
Mike Respert	JR	G	5'11"	2.4 Pts, 0.5 Reb, 0.8 Ast
Antonio Smith	FR	F	6'8"	4.3 Pts, 4.0 Reb, 0.4 Ast
Ray Weathers	JR	G	6'3"	9.7 Pts, 3.0 Reb, 2.3 Ast

== Schedule and results ==
Date time, TV	Rank^{#}	Opponent^{#}	Result	Record	Site city, state
Non-conference regular season
Nov 20, 1995*		at Chaminade; Maui Invitational Tournament	W 69–66	1–0	Lahaina Civic Center; Maui, HI
Nov 21, 1995*		vs. No. 20 North Carolina; Maui Invitational Tournament semifinals	L 70–92	1–1	Lahaina Civic Center; Maui, HI
Nov 22, 1995*		Santa Clara; Maui Invitational Tournament third place game	L 71–77	1–2	Lahaina Civic Center; Maui, HI
Nov 28, 1995*		at No. 25 Arkansas; Great Eight	W 75–72	2–2	The Palace of Auburn Hills; Auburn Hills, MI
Dec 2, 1995*		at No. 18 Louisville	L 59–79	2–3	Freedom Hall; Louisville, KY
Dec 6, 1995*		Evansville	W 67–63	3–3	Breslin Center; East Lansing, MI
Dec 10, 1995*		Detroit Mercy	L 61–63	3–4	Breslin Center; East Lansing, MI
Dec 16, 1995*		at Kansas State	W 67–64	4–4	Bramlage Coliseum; Manhattan, KS
Dec 18, 1995*		at Oklahoma State	L 57–68	4–5	Gallagher-Iba Arena; Stillwater, OK
Dec 21, 1995*		East Tennessee State	W 63–57	5–5	Breslin Center; East Lansing, MI
Dec 29, 1995*		Central Michigan; Oldsmobile Spartan Classic	L 62–69	5–6	Breslin Center; East Lansing, MI
Dec 30, 1995*		Idaho State; Oldsmobile Spartan Classic	W 68–55	6–6	Breslin Center; East Lansing, MI
Big Ten regular season
Jan 4, 1996		Indiana	W 65–60	7–6 (1–0)	Breslin Center; East Lansing, MI
Jan 6, 1996		at No. 13 Illinois	W 68–58	8–6 (–0)	Assembly Hall; Champaign, IL
Jan 13, 1996		No. 23 Michigan; Rivalry	L 54–76	8–7 (2–1)	Breslin Center; East Lansing, MI
Jan 17, 1996		at Wisconsin	L 48–61	8–8 (2–2)	Kohl Center; Madison, WI
Jan 20, 1996		No. 16 Iowa	W 62–60	9–8 (3–2)	Breslin Center; East Lansing, MI
Jan 24, 1996		Northwestern	W 68–54	10–8 (4–2)	Breslin Center; East Lansing, MI
Jan 27, 1996		at Minnesota	W 68–54	11–8 (5–2)	Williams Arena; Minneapolis, MN
Jan 31, 1996		No. 10 Penn State	W 61–58	12–8 (6–2)	Breslin Center; East Lansing, MI
Feb 3, 1996		at No. 17 Purdue	L 51–56	12–9 (6–3)	Mackey Arena; West Lafayette, IN
Feb 7, 1996		Ohio State	W 55–41	13–9 (7–3)	Breslin Center; East Lansing, MI
Feb 10, 1996		at No. 10 Penn State	L 50–54	13–10 (7–4)	Rec Hall; University Park, PA
Feb 14, 1996		Minnesota	L 63–64	13–11 (7–5)	Breslin Center; East Lansing, MI
Feb 17, 1996		at Northwestern	W 75–57	14–11 (8–5)	Welsh-Ryan Arena; Evanston, IL
Feb 21, 1996		at No. 18 Iowa	L 47–83	14–12 (8–6)	Carver-Hawkeye Arena; Iowa City, IA
Feb 24, 1996		Wisconsin	L 52–73	14–13 (8–7)	Breslin Center; East Lansing, MI
Feb 27, 1996		at Michigan; Rivalry	L 46–75	14–14 (8–8)	Crisler Arena; Ann Arbor, MI
Mar 6, 1996		Illinois	W 77–67	15–14 (9–8)	Breslin Center; East Lansing, MI
Mar 10, 1996		at Indiana	L 53–57	15–15 (9–9)	Assembly Hall; Bloomington, IN
NIT
Mar 12, 1996*		Washington first round	W 64–50	16–15	Breslin Center; East Lansing, MI
Mar 19, 1996*		at Fresno State second round	L 63–68	16–16	Selland Arena; Fresno, CA
*Non-conference game. ^{#}Rankings from AP Poll, (#) denotes seed within region. (#) Tournament seedings in parentheses. All times are in Central Time; Source.
