= 2009 MEAC men's basketball tournament =

- 2009 Tournament Logo
- Classification: Division I
- Season: 2008–09
- Teams: 11
- Site: Lawrence Joel Veterans Memorial Coliseum; Winston-Salem, North Carolina
- Champions: Morgan State (2nd title)
- Winning coach: Todd Bozeman (1st title)
- MVP: Reggie Holmes (Morgan State)
- Attendance: 40,046
- Television: ESPNU

2008–09 MEAC men's basketball standings
	Conf.				Overall
Team	W		L	PCT	W		L	PCT
Morgan State †	13	–	3	.813	23	–	12	.657
South Carolina State	10	–	6	.625	17	–	14	.548
Bethune–Cookman	9	–	7	.563	17	–	16	.515
North Carolina A&T	9	–	7	.563	16	–	16	.500
Norfolk State	9	–	7	.563	13	–	18	.419
Coppin State	9	–	7	.563	13	–	19	.406
Hampton	8	–	8	.500	16	–	16	.500
Florida A&M	6	–	10	.375	10	–	21	.323
Howard	6	–	10	.375	8	–	23	.258
Delaware State	6	–	10	.375	8	–	24	.250
Maryland Eastern Shore	3	–	13	.188	7	–	23	.233
Winston-Salem State		–		–	8	–	22	.267
† 2009 MEAC tournament winner Rankings from AP Poll

The 2009 Mid-Eastern Athletic Conference men's basketball tournament, the culmination of the 2008–09 Mid-Eastern Athletic Conference men's basketball season and a part of the 2008-09 NCAA Division I men's basketball season, took place from March 10–March 14, 2009, at the Lawrence Joel Veterans Memorial Coliseum in Winston-Salem, North Carolina. The tournament was broadcast on the ESPNU.

The championship game matched Morgan State against Norfolk State, who made its first appearance in the MEAC championship game since it joined the league in 1997. Morgan State won 83–69, for its 2nd tournament title, the first won in 1977. As champion, Morgan State received the MEAC's automatic bid to the 2009 NCAA tournament.

== Bracket ==
First round
8	Florida A&M	71
9	Howard	58
7	Hampton	51
10	Delaware State	32
6	Bethune–Cookman	52
11	Maryland Eastern Shore	47

Quarterfinals
1	Morgan State	71
8	Florida A&M	41
4	North Carolina A&T	63
5	Coppin State	66
2	South Carolina State	57
7	Hampton	56
3	Norfolk State	63
6	Bethune–Cookman	58

Semifinals
1	Morgan State	75
5	Coppin State	67
2	South Carolina State	71
3	Norfolk State	74

Championship Game
1	Morgan State	83
3	Norfolk State	69
