= 1995–96 Wisconsin Badgers men's basketball team =

American college basketball season

1995–96 Wisconsin Badgers men's basketball

NIT Tournament Second Round
- Conference: Big Ten Conference
- Record: 17-15 (8-10 Big Ten)
- Head coach: Dick Bennett (1st season)
- Assistant coaches: Brad Soderberg; Shawn Hood; Brian Hecker
- Home arena: UW Field House (capacity: 11,500)

1995–96 Big Ten Conference men's basketball standings
	Conf.				Overall
Team	W		L	PCT	W		L	PCT
Indiana (Note: Indiana adjusted from 12–6, 19–12)	13	–	5	.722	20	–	11	.645
No. 18 Penn State	12	–	6	.667	21	–	7	.750
No. 21 Iowa (Note: Iowa adjusted from 11–7, 23–9)	12	–	6	.667	24	–	8	.750
Minnesota (Note: Minnesota adjusted from 10–8, 19–13 (vacated 2 games))	11	–	7	.611	20	–	10	.667
Wisconsin (Note: Wisconsin adjusted from 8–10, 17–15)	9	–	9	.500	18	–	14	.563
Michigan State	9	–	9	.500	16	–	16	.500
Illinois	7	–	11	.389	18	–	13	.581
No. 4 Purdue (Note: Purdue adjusted from 15–3, 26–6 (forfeit 18 wins, vacated 2 games))	6	–	12	.333	7	–	23	.233
Ohio State (Note: Ohio State adjusted from 3–15, 10–17)	5	–	13	.278	12	–	15	.444
Northwestern (Note: Northwestern adjusted from 2–16, 7–20)	4	–	14	.222	9	–	18	.333
Michigan (Note: Michigan adjusted from 10–8/21–11 (vacated 21 games))	1	–	8	.111	1	–	10	.091
Rankings from AP Poll; Records above are after NCAA sanctions against Minnesota, Purdue, and Michigan as noted:

The 1995–96 Wisconsin Badgers men's basketball team represented the University of Wisconsin–Madison as a member of the Big Ten Conference during the 1995-96 NCAA Division I men's basketball season. It was head coach Dick Bennett's first season leading the Badgers. The team played its home games in Madison, Wisconsin at the UW Field House. Wisconsin finished the season 17–15, 8–10 in Big Ten play to finish in eighth place. The Badgers returned to the postseason by accepting a bid to the National Invitation Tournament, in which they beat Manhattan before falling to Illinois State in the second round.

== Offseason ==
Head coach Stan Van Gundy was fired on March 14, 1995, after one season that ended in a disappointing 13–14 record. The university announced the hiring of Dick Bennett as the 13th head coach in program history on March 31, 1995. Bennett had compiled a 361–188 (.658) record over 19 collegiate seasons at UW-Stevens Point and UW-Green Bay. Just prior to taking his "dream job" in Madison, Bennett had led UW-Green Bay to back-to-back NCAA Tournament appearances out of the Mid-Continent Conference and Midwestern Collegiate Conference.

Though 6-foot-7 Sam Okey had verbally committed to Van Gundy the previous year, the McDonald's All-American honored his commitment to play in-state for the Badgers. Okey was regarded across the country as a top 15 recruit despite hailing from tiny Cassville (pop. 1,025) in southwest Wisconsin.

== Season summary ==
Wisconsin started the Bennett-era with losses to a pair of top teams at the Maui Invitational, No. 3 Villanova and defending national champion UCLA (No. 4). In the midst of attrition, the Badgers still put together two separate four-game winning streaks during non-conference play, including a home defeat of Temple, 57–54, in overtime.

Incumbent point guard Darnell Hoskins started the first nine games, then transferred to his hometown University of Dayton in mid-December with the team's record at 5–4. Freshman Duany Duany suffered a season-ending injury to his right foot during practice the weekend of Thanksgiving and played only two games before taking a medical redshirt. Sophomore guard Sean Mason also suffered a season-ending right knee injury late in a win over No. 21 Michigan, 51–46. In that game, the Badgers held the Wolverines to three second-half field goals to make Bennett the first Wisconsin coach to win his Big Ten opener since Walter "Doc" Meanwell in 1912.

The benefits of Bennett's defense-first mentality were evident on other occasions. Wisconsin finished the season 10–1 when holding opponents to fewer than 60 points. The Badgers also held Michigan State scoreless for the first 9:38 of the teams' game in Madison.

Wisconsin managed to go above .500 in conference play (3–2) for the first time after consecutive wins with only seven scholarship players available. First the Badgers beat No. 11 Iowa, 80–71, on January 13, 1996, behind 23 points from Okey. It was the third of 12 sellouts the team took part in away from Maui. The next game, defense and Mosezell Peterson's 23–11 double-double spurred Wisconsin to the aforementioned 61–48 win over visiting Michigan State.

Beyond Okey's all-around brilliance, the emergence of freshman guard Hennssy Auriental eased the loss of Hoskins. After scoring in double figures in nine of 11 contests earlier in the year, Auriental made a game-tying three-pointer with under a minute left to help Wisconsin outlast Minnesota in overtime on January 24, 1996. The Montreal native also hit the game-winning jumper with seven seconds left at Illinois on February 3 to propel the Badgers to a 57–56 win.

On February 21, 1996, Northwestern completed a season sweep of the Badgers at the Field House when Geno Carlisle hit for 39 points in a game televised by ESPN. The loss was part of a 2–5 closing stretch that put an NCAA Tournament bid out of reach, despite a buzzer-beater by sophomore Sean Daugherty to beat No. 16 Penn State on March 6. Wisconsin settled for an NIT bid.

=== Postseason ===
The team hosted a first-round NIT game against Manhattan at the UW Field House. The Badgers held the Jaspers without a field goal for the final 11:28 of the game to pull out a 55–42 win. However, Peterson, the team's second-leading scorer, dislocated his left knee cap in the victory, an injury that would ultimately end the sophomore's career.

Wisconsin hosted Illinois State in the second round. Despite 28 points from Okey, a career-high to that point, the Redbirds advanced with a convincing 77–62 win.

== Awards ==
Sam Okey

- Big Ten Freshman of the Year (coaches and media)
- All-Big Ten Honorable mention (media)

== Roster ==
1995–96 Wisconsin Badgers men's basketball team
Players
Coaches

Pos.	#	Name	Height	Weight	Year	Hometown
F	0	Osita Nwachukwu (C)	6 ft 8 in (2.03 m)	230 lb (104 kg)	Sr	Awo-Mbieri, Imo, Nigeria
G	3	Duany Duany (injured) (redshirt)	6 ft 4 in (1.93 m)	170 lb (77 kg)	Fr	Bloomington, IN
F	4	Sam Okey	6 ft 7 in (2.01 m)	230 lb (104 kg)	Fr	Cassville, WI
G	5	Hennssy Auriantal	6 ft 1 in (1.85 m)	180 lb (82 kg)	Fr	Montreal
G	10	Darnell Hoskins	6 ft 0 in (1.83 m)	170 lb (77 kg)	Jr	Dayton, OH
G	13	Mosezell Peterson	6 ft 4 in (1.93 m)	200 lb (91 kg)	So	Louisville, KY
G	14	Jeremy Hall	5 ft 10 in (1.78 m)	170 lb (77 kg)	Fr	Garrett, KY
G	20	Shawn Carlin (W)	6 ft 3 in (1.91 m)	180 lb (82 kg)	Sr	Middleton, WI
G	22	Sean Mason (injured)	6 ft 2 in (1.88 m)	175 lb (79 kg)	So	Country Club Hills, IL
G	23	Mike Kosolcharoen (W)	6 ft 1 in (1.85 m)	200 lb (91 kg)	Fr	Adams, WI
G	25	David Burkemper (W)	6 ft 1 in (1.85 m)	205 lb (93 kg)	So	Hubertus, WI
G	32	D.J. Walker	6 ft 3 in (1.91 m)	185 lb (84 kg)	Fr	Milwaukee, WI
F	33	Brian Vraney (W)	6 ft 6 in (1.98 m)	230 lb (104 kg)	So	Valders, WI
C	40	Paul Grant (I) (redshirt)	6 ft 11 in (2.11 m)	235 lb (107 kg)	Sr	West Bloomfield, MI
F	41	Booker Coleman	6 ft 9 in (2.06 m)	225 lb (102 kg)	So	Jamestown, NY
F	52	Sean Daugherty	6 ft 10 in (2.08 m)	230 lb (104 kg)	So	Vincennes, IN
F		Donald Hayes (W)	6 ft 5 in (1.96 m)	198 lb (90 kg)	So	Madison, WI
G/F		Adam Shafer (I)(W)	6 ft 4 in (1.93 m)	180 lb (82 kg)	So	Downers Grove, IL
F		Erik Malinowski (W)	—	—		Watertown, WI

Head coach

- Dick Bennett (Ripon)

Assistant coach(es)

- Brad Soderberg (Ripon)
- Shawn Hood
- Brian Hecker

Legend

- (C) Team captain
- (S) Suspended
- (I) Ineligible
- (W) Walk-on
- Injured
- Current redshirt

Roster
Last update: 2019-08-05

== Schedule ==
Date time, TV	Opponent	Result	Record	High points	High rebounds	High assists	Site (attendance) city, state
Regular Season
11/20/1995*	vs. No. 3 Villanova; Maui Invitational	L 58-66	0-1	17 – Peterson	9 – Daugherty	7 – Hoskins	Lahaina Civic Center (2,400); Maui, HI
11/21/1995*	vs. No. 4 UCLA; Maui Invitational	L 57-68	0-2	21 – Okey	9 – Okey	4 – Peterson	Lahaina Civic Center (2,400); Maui, HI
11/22/1995*	vs. Chaminade; Maui Invitational	W 104-66	1-2	17 – Nwachukwu	10 – Nwachukwu	6 – Okey	Lahaina Civic Center (2,400); Maui, HI
11/28/1995*	Northern Illinois	W 89-55	2-2	18 – Peterson	11 – Daugherty	3 – Okey	UW Field House (10,827); Madison, WI
12/2/1995*	Temple	W 57-54 ^{OT}	3-2	16 – Hoskins	6 – Mason, Okey	2 – Auriental, Mason, Okey	UW Field House (11,218); Madison, WI
12/5/1995*	at Wright State	W 94-91	4-2	22 – Hoskins	6 – Daugherty	9 – Hoskins	Ervin J. Nutter Center (8,032); Dayton, OH
12/9/1995*	St. Bonaventure	L 62-76	4-3	27 – Okey	14 – Okey	3 – Okey	UW Field House (10,967); Madison, WI
12/11/1995*	Providence	L 57-58	4-4	19 – Auriental	10 – Okey	5 – Hoskins	Providence Civic Center (8,222); Providence, RI
12/14/1995*	Valparaiso	W 90-73	5-4	23 – Okey	9 – Okey	5 – Okey	UW Field House (11,015); Madison, WI
12/23/1995*	UW-Milwaukee	W 94-63	6-4	20 – Mason	9 – Nwachukwu	3 – Carlin, Hall, Okey	UW Field House (11,128); Madison, WI
12/28/1995	Eastern Illinois	W 105-70	7-4	19 – Hall	8 – Daugherty	6 – Okey	UW Field House (10,913); Madison, WI
12/31/1995*	Marquette	W 55-46	8-4	16 – Nwachukwu	12 – Nwachukwu	3 – Okey	UW Field House (11,719); Madison, WI
1/3/1996	No. 21 Michigan	W 51-46	9-4 (1-0)	17 – Peterson	12 – Daugherty	4 – Okey	UW Field House (11,859); Madison, WI
1/7/1996	at Penn State	L 50-79	9-5 (1-1)	10 – Auriental	6 – Daugherty, Okey	2 – Auriental, Carlin	Rec Hall (6,288); University Park, PA
1/10/1996	at Indiana	L 55-81	9-6 (1-2)	13 – Hall	9 – Okey	7 – Hall	Assembly Hall (16,674); Bloomington, IN
1/13/1996	No. 11 Iowa	W 80-71	10-6 (2-2)	23 – Okey	9 – Peterson	8 – Hall	UW Field House (11,924); Madison, WI
1/17/1996	Michigan State	W 61-48	11-6 (3-2)	23 – Peterson	11 – Peterson	4 – Okey	UW Field House (10,975); Madison, WI
1/20/1996	at Northwestern	L 52-62	11-7 (3-3)	12 – Peterson	8 – Nwachukwu, Okey	3 – Hall	Welsh-Ryan Arena (6,716); Evanston, IL
1/24/1996	Minnesota	W 73-65 ^{OT}	12-7 (4-3)	17 – Daugherty	12 – Daugherty	4 – Auriental, Okey, Peterson	UW Field House (11,483); Madison, WI
1/31/1996; ESPN2	at Ohio State	L 55-63	12-8 (4-4)	16 – Okey	6 – Okey	4 – Hall	St. John Arena (11,917); Columbus, OH
2/3/1996	Illinois	W 57-56	13-8 (5-4)	15 – Hall	13 – Daugherty	3 – Hall	Assembly Hall (16,450); Champaign, IL
2/7/1996	No. 14 Purdue	L 42-75	13-9 (5-5)	13 – Daugherty	7 – Daugherty	2 – Carlin	UW Field House (11,713); Madison, WI
2/10/1996	Ohio State	W 62-56	14-9 (6-5)	18 – Auriental	7 – Nwachukwu	4 – Auriental, Okey, Peterson	UW Field House (11,500); Madison, WI
2/17/1996	at Minnesota	L 66-70	14-10 (6-6)	14 – Okey	8 – Okey	5 – Okey	Williams Arena (14,379); Minneapolis, MN
2/26/1996; ESPN	Northwestern	L 71-82	14-11 (6-7)	17 – Okey	10 – Nwachukwu	7 – Okey	UW Field House (11,266); Madison, WI
2/24/1996	at Michigan State	W 73-52	15-11 (7-7)	16 – Daugherty	7 – Daugherty	5 – Hall	Breslin Student Events Center (15,138); East Lansing, MI
2/28/1996	at No. 20 Iowa	L 54-69	15-12 (7-8)	22 – Daugherty	10 – Okey	4 – Auriental, Okey	Carver-Hawkeye Arena (15,500); Iowa City, IA
3/2/1996	Indiana	L 68-76	15-13 (7-9)	16 – Okey, Peterson	6 – Okey	4 – Auriental, Okey	UW Field House (11,993); Madison, WI
3/6/1996	No. 16 Penn State	W 54-52	16-13 (8-9)	17 – Okey	11 – Nwachukwu	5 – Okey	UW Field House (11,732); Madison, WI
3/9/1996	at Michigan	L 54-69	16-14 (8-10)	12 – Peterson	7 – Peterson	4 – Hall, Okey	Crisler Arena (13,562); Ann Arbor, MI
National Invitation Tournament
3/13/1996*	Manhattan; NIT First Round	W 55-42	17-14 (8-10)	15 – Auriental	10 – Okey	6 – Okey	UW Field House (8,913); Madison, WI
3/18/1996*	Illinois State; NIT Second Round	L 62-77	17-15 (8-10)	28 – Okey	10 – Okey	6 – Okey	UW Field House (11,111); Madison, WI
*Non-conference game. (#) Tournament seedings in parentheses.

== Player statistics ==
Individual player statistics (Final)
			Minutes		Scoring		Total FGs			3-point FGs			Free Throws			Rebounds								
Player	GP	GS	Tot	Avg	Pts	Avg	FG	FGA	Pct	3FG	3FA	Pct	FT	FTA	Pct	Off	Def	Tot	Avg	A	TO	Blk	Stl	PF
Okey, Sam	32	32	1024	32.0	423	13.2	151	343	.440	21	72	.292	100	142	.704			218	6.8	100	77	42	35	101
Peterson, Mosezell	30	21	824	27.5	344	11.5	118	282	.418	29	96	.302	79	107	.738			113	3.8	50	62	1	18	62
Daugherty, Sean	32	31	996	31.1	332	10.4	125	272	.460	12	39	.308	70	96	.729			202	6.3	33	56	13	22	95
Hoskins, Darnell	9	9	277	30.8	85	9.4	26	57	.456	9	27	.333	24	31	.774			18	2.0	35	23	0	15	17
Auriental, Hennssy	32	21	904	28.3	277	8.7	96	213	.451	35	88	.398	50	76	.658			76	2.4	67	77	1	43	71
Mason, Sean	13	10	340	26.2	112	8.6	37	93	.398	10	31	.323	28	33	.848			31	2.4	22	27	6	15	29
Duany, Duany	2	0	22	11.0	15	7.5	4	7	.571	3	4	.750	4	4	1.000			3	1.5	0	0	0	0	1
Hall, Jeremy	28	9	526	18.8	195	7.0	60	155	.387	49	132	.371	26	33	.788			36	1.3	58	57	2	9	25
Nwachukwu, Osita	31	16	702	22.6	181	5.8	59	119	.496	0	0	.000	63	108	.583			167	5.4	11	46	5	21	87
Carlin, Shawn	29	10	470	16.2	89	3.1	26	75	.347	21	56	.375	16	20	.800			33	1.1	36	34	2	18	49
Vraney, Brian	13	0	30	2.3	23	1.8	9	14	.643	0	0	.000	5	6	.833			13	1.0	0	0	0	0	3
Coleman, Booker	25	1	216	8.6	26	1.0	10	21	.476	0	0	.000	6	18	.333			59	2.4	0	12	18	3	36
Hayes, Donald	2	0	6	3.0	2	1.0	1	1	1.000	0	0	.000	0	0	.000			2	1.0	0	0	0	0	0
Kosolcharoen, Mike	18	0	108	6.0	10	0.6	4	20	.200	0	6	.000	2	6	.333			16	0.9	3	7	1	2	18
Burkemper, David	3	0	3	1.0	0	0.0	0	0	.000	0	0	.000	0	0	.000			0	0.0	0	1	0	0	0
Malinowski, Erik	2	0	2	1.0	0	0.0	0	0	.000	0	0	.000	0	0	.000			0	0.0	0	0	0	0	0
Total	32	-	6450	40.3	2114	66.1	726	1672	.434	189	551	.343	473	680	.696	363	708	1071	33.5	415	486	91	201	594
Opponents	32	-	6450	40.3	2073	64.8	733	1704	.430	199	564	.353	408	610	.669	362	689	1051	32.8	408	488	118	225	728

Legend
GP	Games played	GS	Games started	Avg	Average per game
FG	Field goals made	FGA	Field-goal attempts	Off	Offensive rebounds
Def	Defensive rebounds	A	Assists	TO	Turnovers
Blk	Blocks	Stl	Steals	High	Team high

== Records & trivia ==
Okey became the first player in Big Ten history to lead his team in points, rebounds, assists and blocked shots over a full season.
