= 1995–96 Michigan Wolverines men's basketball team =

American college basketball season

1995–96 Michigan Wolverines men's basketball

NCAA tournament, Round of 64 (vacated)
- Conference: Big Ten Conference
- Record: 1–10 (21–11 unadjusted) (1–8 Big Ten)
- Head coach: Steve Fisher
- Assistant coaches: Brian Dutcher; Jay Smith; Scott Trost
- MVP: Maurice Taylor
- Captain: Dugan Fife
- Home arena: Crisler Arena

1995–96 Big Ten Conference men's basketball standings
	Conf.				Overall
Team	W		L	PCT	W		L	PCT
Indiana (Note: Indiana adjusted from 12–6, 19–12)	13	–	5	.722	20	–	11	.645
No. 18 Penn State	12	–	6	.667	21	–	7	.750
No. 21 Iowa (Note: Iowa adjusted from 11–7, 23–9)	12	–	6	.667	24	–	8	.750
Minnesota (Note: Minnesota adjusted from 10–8, 19–13 (vacated 2 games))	11	–	7	.611	20	–	10	.667
Wisconsin (Note: Wisconsin adjusted from 8–10, 17–15)	9	–	9	.500	18	–	14	.563
Michigan State	9	–	9	.500	16	–	16	.500
Illinois	7	–	11	.389	18	–	13	.581
No. 4 Purdue (Note: Purdue adjusted from 15–3, 26–6 (forfeit 18 wins, vacated 2 games))	6	–	12	.333	7	–	23	.233
Ohio State (Note: Ohio State adjusted from 3–15, 10–17)	5	–	13	.278	12	–	15	.444
Northwestern (Note: Northwestern adjusted from 2–16, 7–20)	4	–	14	.222	9	–	18	.333
Michigan (Note: Michigan adjusted from 10–8/21–11 (vacated 21 games))	1	–	8	.111	1	–	10	.091
Rankings from AP Poll; Records above are after NCAA sanctions against Minnesota, Purdue, and Michigan as noted:

The 1995–96 Michigan Wolverines men's basketball team represented the University of Michigan in intercollegiate college basketball during the 1995–96 season. The team played its home games in the Crisler Arena in Ann Arbor, Michigan, and was a member of the Big Ten Conference. Under the direction of head coach Steve Fisher, the team finished fifth in the Big Ten Conference. The team earned an invitation to the 1996 NCAA Division I men's basketball tournament as a number seven seed where it was eliminated in the first round. The team was ranked for thirteen of the eighteen weeks of Associated Press Top Twenty-Five Poll, starting the season ranked seventh, peaking at number sixteen and ending unranked, and it also ended the season unranked in the final USA Today/CNN Poll. The team had a 3–7 record against ranked opponents, including the following victories: December 9, 1995, against #18 Duke 88–84 at home, January 9, 1996, against #21 Illinois 83–68 at home, 1/21 #14 Penn State 67–66 at home.

Dugan Fife served as team captain, while Maurice Taylor earned team MVP honors. The team's leading scorers were Maurice Taylor (447 points), Louis Bullock (432 points), and Maceo Baston (375 points). The leading rebounders were Maurice Taylor (223), Maceo Baston (211) and Albert White (150).

Baston posted a single-season field goal percentage of 68.16%, surpassing his own school record 67.42% set the prior year and establishing the current single-season record.

In the 64-team 1996 NCAA Division I men's basketball tournament, the team earned a number seven seed but was eliminated in the first round Midwest region game by the number ten-seeded Texas Longhorns 80–76 at the Bradley Center, ending the team's season on March 15, 1996.

== Rankings ==
Ranking movements Legend: ██ Increase in ranking ██ Decrease in ranking
	Week																	
Poll	Pre	1	2	3	4	5	6	7	8	9	10	11	12	13	14	15	16	Final
AP Poll	17	16	24	22	18	17	19	21	23	20	16	20	23					

== Team players drafted into the NBA ==
Four players from this team were selected in the NBA draft.

Year	Round	Pick	Overall	Player	NBA Club
1997	1	14	14	Maurice Taylor	Los Angeles Clippers
1998	1	6	6	Robert Traylor	Dallas Mavericks
1998	2	29	58	Maceo Baston	Chicago Bulls
1999	2	13	42	Louis Bullock	Minnesota Timberwolves

== See also ==
- 1996 NCAA Division I men's basketball tournament
- List of vacated and forfeited games in college basketball
- University of Michigan basketball scandal
