= 2010 MEAC men's basketball tournament =

- 2010 MEAC Tournament Logo
- Classification: Division I
- Season: 2009–10
- Teams: 11
- Site: Lawrence Joel Veterans Memorial Coliseum; Winston-Salem, North Carolina
- Champions: Morgan State (3rd title)
- Winning coach: Todd Bozeman (2nd title)
- Television: ESPN2

2009–10 MEAC men's basketball standings
	Conf.				Overall
Team	W		L	PCT	W		L	PCT
Morgan State †	15	–	1	.938	24	–	10	.706
Delaware State	11	–	5	.688	16	–	11	.593
South Carolina State	10	–	6	.625	16	–	13	.552
Norfolk State	9	–	7	.563	11	–	18	.379
Hampton	8	–	8	.500	13	–	17	.433
Maryland Eastern Shore	8	–	8	.500	10	–	20	.333
Bethune–Cookman	7	–	9	.438	16	–	15	.516
Howard	6	–	10	.375	7	–	24	.226
North Carolina A&T	6	–	10	.375	10	–	21	.323
Florida A&M	5	–	11	.313	9	–	21	.300
Coppin St.	3	–	13	.188	8	–	21	.276
† 2010 MEAC tournament winner As of March 19, 2010; Rankings from AP Poll

The 2010 Mid-Eastern Athletic Conference men's basketball tournament took place on March 9–13, 2010 at the Lawrence Joel Veterans Memorial Coliseum in Winston-Salem, North Carolina. The championship game was nationally televised on ESPN2 on Saturday, March 13, 2010 at 2:00 p.m. The tournament champion, Morgan State, received an automatic berth to the 2010 NCAA Men's Division I Basketball Tournament.

The Morgan State Bears, as the 2009-10 conference regular season champions, earned the No. 1 seed and an early round bye for the third straight season.

== Bracket ==
Opening Round; Tuesday–Wednesday, March 9–10
8	Howard	55
9	North Carolina A&T	65
7	Bethune-Cookman	64
10	Florida A&M	53
6	Maryland - Eastern Shore	64
11	Coppin State	58

Quarterfinals; Wednesday–Thursday, March 10–11
1	Morgan State	84
9	North Carolina A&T	57
4	Norfolk State	70
5	Hampton	73
2	Delaware State	57
7	Bethune-Cookman	55
3	South Carolina State	59
6	Maryland - Eastern Shore	53

Semifinals; Friday, March 12
1	Morgan State	74
5	Hampton	67
2	Delaware State	66
3	South Carolina State	70*

Championship; Sunday, March 13
1	Morgan State	68
3	South Carolina State	61

Source: 2010 MEAC Men's Basketball Tournament Bracket at www.meacsports.com
