= 1995–96 Indiana Hoosiers men's basketball team =

American college basketball season

1995–96 Indiana Hoosiers men's basketball

NCAA men's Division I tournament, Round of 64
- Conference: Big Ten Conference
- Record: 20–11 (13–5 Big Ten)
- Head coach: Bobby Knight (25th season)
- Assistant coaches: Dan Dakich; Ron Felling; Craig Hartman
- Captains: Brian Evans; Todd Lindeman
- Home arena: Assembly Hall

1995–96 Big Ten Conference men's basketball standings
	Conf.				Overall
Team	W		L	PCT	W		L	PCT
Indiana (Note: Indiana adjusted from 12–6, 19–12)	13	–	5	.722	20	–	11	.645
No. 18 Penn State	12	–	6	.667	21	–	7	.750
No. 21 Iowa (Note: Iowa adjusted from 11–7, 23–9)	12	–	6	.667	24	–	8	.750
Minnesota (Note: Minnesota adjusted from 10–8, 19–13 (vacated 2 games))	11	–	7	.611	20	–	10	.667
Wisconsin (Note: Wisconsin adjusted from 8–10, 17–15)	9	–	9	.500	18	–	14	.563
Michigan State	9	–	9	.500	16	–	16	.500
Illinois	7	–	11	.389	18	–	13	.581
No. 4 Purdue (Note: Purdue adjusted from 15–3, 26–6 (forfeit 18 wins, vacated 2 games))	6	–	12	.333	7	–	23	.233
Ohio State (Note: Ohio State adjusted from 3–15, 10–17)	5	–	13	.278	12	–	15	.444
Northwestern (Note: Northwestern adjusted from 2–16, 7–20)	4	–	14	.222	9	–	18	.333
Michigan (Note: Michigan adjusted from 10–8/21–11 (vacated 21 games))	1	–	8	.111	1	–	10	.091
Rankings from AP Poll; Records above are after NCAA sanctions against Minnesota, Purdue, and Michigan as noted:

The 1995–96 Indiana Hoosiers men's basketball team represented Indiana University. Their head coach was Bobby Knight, who was in his 25th year. The team played its home games in Assembly Hall in Bloomington, Indiana, and was a member of the Big Ten Conference.

The Hoosiers finished the regular season with an overall record of 20–11 and a conference record of 13–5, finishing 2nd in the Big Ten Conference. The Hoosiers were invited to participate in the 1996 NCAA tournament. However, IU made a quick exit with an 80–62 loss in the first round to Boston College.

== Roster ==
No.	Name	Position	Ht.	Year	Hometown
3	Charlie Miller	F	6–7	So.	Miami, Florida
4	Chris Rowles	G	6–1	So.	Kansas City, Missouri
5	Neil Reed	G	6–2	So.	Metairie, Louisiana
20	Sherron Wilkerson	G	6–4	So.	Jeffersonville, Indiana
21	Richard Mandeville	C	7–1	So.	Pasadena, California
23	Kevin Lemme	G	5–11	Sr.	Granger, Indiana
32	Robbie Eggers	F	6–10	So.	Cuyahoga Falls, Ohio
33	Larry Richardson	G	6–8	RS Fr.	Orange Park, Florida
34	Brian Evans	F	6–8	Sr.	Terre Haute, Indiana
42	Lou Moore	G/F	6–7	So.	Rock Hill, South Carolina
45	Andrae Patterson	F	6–8	So.	Abilene, Texas
50	Todd Lindeman	C	7–1	Sr.	Channing, Michigan
55	Haris Mujezinovic	C	6–9	Jr.	Chicago

== Schedule/results ==
Date time, TV	Rank^{#}	Opponent^{#}	Result	Record	Site city, state
Regular season
11/23/1995*	No. 23	vs. Alaska-Anchorage; Great Alaska Shootout Quarterfinals	W 84–79	1–0	Sullivan Arena; Anchorage, AK
11/24/1995*	No. 23	vs. Duke; Great Alaska Shootout Semifinals	L 64–70	1–1	Sullivan Arena; Anchorage, AK
11/25/1995*	No. 23	vs. Connecticut; Great Alaska Shootout Consolation	L 52–86	1–2	Sullivan Arena; Anchorage, AK
11/28/1995*		Notre Dame	W 73–53	2–2	Assembly Hall; Bloomington, Indiana
12/2/1995*		vs. No. 1 Kentucky; Indiana–Kentucky rivalry	L 82–89	2–3	RCA Dome; Indianapolis, Indiana
12/8/1995*		Delaware; Indiana Classic	W 85–68	3–3	Assembly Hall; Bloomington, Indiana
12/9/1995*		Bowling Green State; Indiana Classic	W 78–67	4–3	Assembly Hall; Bloomington, Indiana
12/16/1995*		vs. No. 1 Kansas	L 83–91	4–4	Kemper Arena; Kansas City, Missouri
12/20/1995*		at Evansville	W 76–48	5–4	Roberts Municipal Stadium; Evansville, Indiana
12/23/1995*		DePaul	L 82–84	5–5	Assembly Hall; Bloomington, Indiana
12/29/1995*		vs. Appalachian State; Union Federal Hoosier Classic	W 103–59	6–5	Market Square Arena; Indianapolis
12/30/1995*		vs. Weber State; Union Federal Hoosier Classic	W 82–62	7–5	Market Square Arena; Indianapolis
1/4/1996		at Michigan State	L 60–65	7–6 (0–1)	Breslin Center; East Lansing, Michigan
1/6/1996		Ohio State	W 89–67	8–6 (1–1)	Assembly Hall; Bloomington, Indiana
1/10/1996		Wisconsin	W 81–55	9–6 (2–1)	Assembly Hall; Bloomington, Indiana
1/13/1996		at No. 21 Illinois; Rivalry	W 85–71	10–6 (3–1)	Assembly Hall; Champaign, Illinois
1/16/1996		at Purdue; Rivalry	L 69–74^	11–6 (4–1)	Mackey Arena; West Lafayette, Indiana
1/23/1996		No. 20 Michigan	W 99–83	12–6 (5–1)	Assembly Hall; Bloomington, Indiana
1/27/1996		at Penn State	L 68–82	12–7 (5–2)	Rec Hall; University Park, Pennsylvania
1/30/1996		Iowa	W 76–73	13–7 (6–2)	Assembly Hall; Bloomington, Indiana
2/4/1996		Northwestern	W 95–61	14–7 (7–2)	Assembly Hall; Bloomingotn, Indiana
2/6/1996		at Minnesota	W 81–66	15–7 (8–2)	Williams Arena; Minneapolis
2/11/1996		at Iowa	L 50–76	15–8 (8–3)	Carver–Hawkeye Arena; Iowa City, Iowa
2/14/1996		Penn State	W 72–54	16–8 (9–3)	Assembly Hall; Bloomington, Indiana
2/18/1996		at Michigan	L 75–80	16–9 (9–4)	Crisler Arena; Ann Arbor, Michigan
2/25/1996		Purdue; Rivalry	L 72–74	16–10 (9–5)	Assembly Hall; Bloomington, Indiana
2/28/1996		Illinois; Rivalry	W 76–64	17–10 (10–5)	Assembly Hall; Bloomington, Indiana
3/2/1996		at Wisconsin	W 76–68	18–10 (11–5)	Wisconsin Field House; Madison, Wisconsin
3/6/1996		at Ohio State	W 73–56	19–10 (12–5)	St. John Arena; Columbus, Ohio
3/10/1996		Michigan State	W 57–53	20–10 (13–5)	Assembly Hall; Bloomington, Indiana
NCAA tournament
3/15/1996*	No. (6)	vs. No. (11) Boston College; First Round	L 62–80	20–11 (13–5)	Orlando Arena; Orlando, Florida
*Non-conference game. ^{#}Rankings from AP Poll. (#) Tournament seedings in parentheses.

== Notes ==
^Jan 16: Purdue forfeited this game, thus IU's official record is 20–11 (13–5).
