= List of vacated and forfeited games in college basketball =

The following is a list of games ordered vacated or forfeited by the National Collegiate Athletic Association (NCAA) in college basketball. The list does not include forfeits imposed by individual conferences.

As a private association, the NCAA only changes its own records to reflect forfeits or vacations that its own Committee on Infractions has ordered, and not for sanctions imposed by individual conferences.

== Most games vacated and forfeited ==
In some cases, NCAA sanctions covered multiple years. The incidents resulting in the largest number of vacated and/or forfeited games are as follows, with all schools involved being Division I and all teams involved being men's teams unless otherwise indicated:

1. Northern Colorado: 153 games (151 regular-season, 2 postseason) vacated, covering all results from 2010 to 2015.
2. Louisville: 126 games (123 regular-season and tournament wins and 3 tournament losses) vacated, covering four seasons (2011–2015). This includes the Cardinals' 2012 Final Four appearance and 2013 national title, making them the first Division I basketball program of either sex forced to vacate a national title. See 2015 University of Louisville basketball sex scandal.
3. Stephen F. Austin: 117 regular-season and tournament wins from 2014 to 2019 due to an administrative error in certifying eligibility for student-athletes.
4. Michigan: 117 games (113 regular-season and tournament wins and 4 tournament losses) vacated covering six of eight seasons between 1992 and 1999. See University of Michigan basketball scandal (also ).
5. Ohio State, men: 113 games (82 regular-season and tournament wins and 31 regular-season and tournament losses) vacated covering four seasons from 1999 to 2002. See Jim O'Brien and NCAA Violations.
6. Southern, women: 109 wins vacated, covering all results from 2009 to 2015.
7. Syracuse: 106 regular-season wins from 2004 to 2007 and 2010 to 2012. See Syracuse University athletics scandal.
8. Arizona: 70 games (69 regular and tournament season wins and 1 tournament loss) vacated from the 2007–08, 2016–17 and 2017–18 season.
9. Saginaw Valley State, men (D-II): 69 games (65 regular-season wins and 4 NCAA tournament wins) vacated, covering four seasons from 2014 to 2018.
10. New Mexico State: 64 games (40 regular-season and tournament wins and 24 regular-season and tournament losses) vacated covering 5 seasons 1992–1994 and 1997–1998. See Neil McCarthy scandal.
11. Ohio State, women: 55 games (52 wins and 3 losses) vacated from 2016–17 to 2018–19.
12. Fresno State: 50 games (49 regular-season wins and 1 tournament loss) vacated covering three seasons from 1999 to 2001. See Tarkanian and the NCAA.
13. BYU: 47 games (42 regular-season wins, 3 NIT wins, and 2 NIT losses) vacated, covering the 2015–16 and 2016–17 seasons.
14. St. John's: 47 games (46 regular-season wins and 1 tournament loss) vacated covering four seasons from 2001 to 2004.
15. Siena: Vacated 46 wins from 2015 to 2018 seasons.
16. Minnesota: 42 games (including 24 regular-season wins forfeited from the 1977 season). See University of Minnesota basketball scandal.
17. Memphis: 39 games (38 regular-season and tournament wins and one tournament loss) vacated from the 2008 season. See John Calipari era and Derrick Rose.
18. Hawaiʻi: 36 regular-season wins vacated covering the 2012–13 and 2013–14 seasons.
19. Thomas More, women (D-III): 33 games—27 regular-season and 6 NCAA tournament wins, including the national championship, from the 2014–15 season.
20. Louisiana-Lafayette: 33 games (31 wins and 2 tournament losses) vacated from the 2004 and 2005 seasons. See Major violations.
21. FIU: 32 regular-season wins vacated covering four seasons from 2003 to 2006.
22. California: 29 games (28 regular-season wins forfeited and 1 regular-season loss) vacated from the 1995 and 1996 season.
23. Georgia Southern: Vacated 27 regular-season wins from the 2008 and 2009 seasons.
24. Saginaw Valley State, women (D-II): 23 regular-season wins vacated, covering the 2013–14 and 2014–15 seasons.
25. Florida State, men: Vacated 22 games (20 regular-season and 2 NIT wins) from the 2006–07 season.
26. Florida State, women: Vacated 20 regular-season and 2 NCAA tournament wins from the 2006–07 and 2007–08 seasons.
27. USC: 21 regular-season wins and 1 tournament loss vacated from the 2008 season. See University of Southern California athletics scandal.
28. Purdue: 19 regular-season and tournament wins and 1 tournament loss vacated from the 1996 season.

In addition to vacating and forfeiting games, the NCAA has the power to issue other forms of sanctions. The harshest sanction is a ban on a school's competing in a sport for at least one year. Sometimes referred to as the NCAA's death penalty, this sanction has been imposed twice against college basketball programs: (1) the Kentucky Wildcats men's basketball program for the 1952–53 season; and (2) the Louisiana Ragin' Cajuns men's basketball program (then known as the University of Southwestern Louisiana) for the 1973–74 and 1974–75 seasons.

== Vacated and forfeited games ==
Unless indicated otherwise, teams listed here are Division I men's teams, and the following information is from Sports-Reference.

School	Coach	Year	Actual W–L	Adjusted W–L	Games Affected
Alabama	Wimp Sanderson	1986–87	28–5	26–4	Vacated 2 tournament wins and 1 tournament loss
Arizona	Lute Olson	1998–99	22–7	22–6	Vacated 1 tournament loss
Arizona	Kevin O'Neill	2007–08	19–15	0–14	Vacated 19 regular-season wins and 1 tournament loss
Arizona	Sean Miller	2016–17	32–5	0–5	Vacated 30 regular-season and 2 tournament wins
Arizona	Sean Miller	2017–18	27–8	9–8	Vacated 18 regular-season wins
Arizona State	Bill Frieder	1994–95	24–9	22–8	Vacated 2 tournament wins and 1 tournament loss
Auburn	Cliff Ellis	1994–95	16–13	0–29	Forfeited 16 regular-season wins
Austin Peay	Lake Kelly	1972–73	22–7	21–5	Vacated 1 tournament win and 2 tournament losses
BYU	Dave Rose	2015–16	26–11	1–10	Vacated 22 regular-season wins, 3 NIT wins, and 1 NIT loss
BYU	Dave Rose	2016–17	22–11	0–10	Vacated 22 regular-season wins and one NIT loss
California	Todd Bozeman	1994–95	13–14	0–27	Forfeited 13 regular-season wins
California	Todd Bozeman	1995–96	17–11	2–25	Forfeited 15 regular-season wins; vacated one regular-season loss
Clemson	Cliff Ellis	1989–90	26–9	24–8	Vacated 2 tournament wins and 1 tournament loss
UConn	Jim Calhoun	1995–96	32–3	30–2	Vacated 2 tournament wins and 1 tournament loss
DePaul	Joey Meyer	1985–86	18–13	16–12	Vacated 2 tournament wins and 1 tournament loss
DePaul	Joey Meyer	1986–87	28–3	26–2	Vacated 2 tournament wins and 1 tournament loss
DePaul	Joey Meyer	1987–88	22–8	21–7	Vacated 1 tournament win and 1 tournament loss
DePaul	Joey Meyer	1988–89	21–12	20–11	Vacated 1 tournament win and 1 tournament loss
FIU	Donnie Marsh	2002–03	8–21	1–21	Vacated 7 regular-season wins
FIU	Donnie Marsh	2003–04	5–22	0–22	Vacated 5 regular-season wins
FIU	Sergio Rouco	2004–05	13–17	0–17	Vacated 13 regular-season wins
FIU	Sergio Rouco	2005–06	8–20	1–20	Vacated 7 regular-season wins
Florida	Norm Sloan	1986–87	23–11	21–10	Vacated 2 tournament wins and 1 tournament loss
Florida	Norm Sloan	1987–88	23–12	22–11	Vacated 1 tournament win and 1 tournament loss
Florida State (men)	Leonard Hamilton	2006–07	22–13	0–13	Vacated 20 regular-season wins and 2 NIT wins
Florida State (women)	Sue Semrau	2006–07	24–10	8–10	Vacated 14 regular-season and two tournament wins
Florida State (women)	Sue Semrau	2007–08	19–14	13–14	Vacated six regular-season wins
Fresno State	Jerry Tarkanian	1998–99	21–12	1–12	Vacated 20 regular-season wins
Fresno State	Jerry Tarkanian	1999–2000	24–10	12–9	Vacated 12 regular-season wins and 1 tournament loss
Fresno State	Jerry Tarkanian	2000–01	26–7	9–7	Vacated 17 regular-season wins
Georgia	Hugh Durham	1984–85	22–9	21–8	Vacated 1 tournament win and 1 tournament loss
Georgia	Jim Harrick	2001–02	22–10	21–9	Vacated 1 tournament win and 1 tournament loss
Georgia Southern	Jeff Price	2007–08	20–12	0–12	Vacated 20 regular-season wins
Georgia Southern	Jeff Price	2008–09	8–22	1–22	Vacated seven regular-season wins
Hawaii	Gib Arnold	2012–13	17–15	1–15	Vacated 16 regular-season wins
Hawaii	Gib Arnold	2013–14	20–11	0–11	Vacated 20 regular-season wins
Iona	Jim Valvano	1979–80	29–5	28–4	Vacated 1 tournament win and 1 tournament loss
IUPUI	Ron Hunter	2003–04	21–11	3–11	Vacated 18 regular-season wins
Kentucky	Eddie Sutton	1987–88	27–6	25–5	Vacated 2 tournament wins and 1 tournament loss
Long Beach State	Jerry Tarkanian	1970–71	24–5	22–4	Vacated two tournament wins and one tournament loss
Long Beach State	Jerry Tarkanian	1971–72	25–4	23–3	Vacated two tournament wins and one tournament loss
Long Beach State	Jerry Tarkanian	1972–73	26–3	24–2	Vacated two tournament wins and one tournament loss
Long Beach State	Larry Reynolds	2005–06	18–12	0–12	Vacated 18 regular-season wins
Louisiana	Beryl Shipley	1971–72	25–4	23–3	Vacated 2 tournament wins and 1 tournament loss
Louisiana	Beryl Shipley	1972–73	24–5	23–3	Vacated 1 tournament win and 2 tournament losses
Louisiana	Jessie Evans	2003–04	20–9	6–8	Vacated 14 regular-season wins and 1 tournament loss
Louisiana	Robert Lee	2004–05	20–11	3–10	Vacated 17 regular-season wins and 1 tournament loss
Louisville	Rick Pitino	2011–12	30–10	0–9	Vacated 26 regular-season wins, 4 tournament wins, and 1 tournament loss
Louisville	Rick Pitino	2012–13	35–5	0–5	Vacated 29 regular-season wins and 6 tournament wins, including national championship
Louisville	Rick Pitino	2013–14	31–6	0–5	Vacated 29 regular-season wins, 2 tournament wins, and 1 tournament loss
Louisville	Rick Pitino	2014–15	27–9	0–8	Vacated 24 regular-season wins, 3 tournament wins, and 1 tournament loss
Loyola Marymount	Ron Jacobs	1979–80	14–14	14–13	Vacated 1 tournament loss
Manhattan	Bob Delle Bovi	1987–88	7–23	7–23	Forfeited 1 game against Drexel (record unaffected)
Marshall	Rick Huckabay	1986–87	25–6	25–5	Vacated 1 tournament loss
Maryland	Bob Wade	1987–88	18–13	17–12	Vacated 2 tournament wins and 1 tournament loss
Massachusetts	John Calipari	1995–96	35–2	31–1	Vacated 4 tournament wins and 1 tournament loss
Memphis	Dana Kirk	1981–82	24–5	23–4	Vacated 1 tournament win and 1 tournament loss
Memphis	Dana Kirk	1982–83	23–8	22–7	Vacated 1 tournament win and 1 tournament loss
Memphis	Dana Kirk	1983–84	26–7	24–6	Vacated 2 tournament wins and 1 tournament loss
Memphis	Dana Kirk	1984–85	31–4	27–3	Vacated 4 tournament wins and 1 tournament loss
Memphis	Dana Kirk	1985–86	28–6	27–5	Vacated 1 tournament win and 1 tournament loss
Memphis	John Calipari	2007–08	38–2	0–1	Vacated 33 regular-season wins, 5 tournament wins, and 1 tournament loss
Miami (OH)	Jerry Pierson	1988–89	13–15	5–23	Forfeited 8 regular-season wins
Michigan	Steve Fisher	1991–92	25–9	24–8	Vacated 1 tournament win and 1 tournament loss
Michigan	Steve Fisher	1992–93	31–5	0–4	Vacated 26 regular-season wins, five tournament wins, and one tournament loss
Michigan	Steve Fisher	1995–96	21–11	1–10	Vacated 20 regular-season wins and one tournament loss (gained one forfeited win)
Michigan	Steve Fisher	1996–97	24–11	0–11	Vacated 19 regular-season wins and 5 NIT wins
Michigan	Brian Ellerbe	1997–98	25–9	0–8	Vacated 24 regular-season wins, 1 tournament win, and 1 tournament loss
Michigan	Brian Ellerbe	1998–99	12–19	0–19	Vacated 12 regular-season wins
Minnesota	Bill Musselman	1971–72	18–7	17–6	Vacated 1 tournament win and 1 tournament loss
Minnesota	Jim Dutcher	1976–77	24–3	0–27	Forfeited 24 regular-season wins
Minnesota	Clem Haskins	1993–94	22–13	21–12	Vacated 1 tournament win and 1 tournament loss
Minnesota	Clem Haskins	1994–95	19–13	20–11	Vacated 1 tournament loss (gained 1 forfeited win)
Minnesota	Clem Haskins	1995–96	19–13	20–10	Vacated 1 NIT win and 1 NIT loss (gained 2 forfeited wins)
Minnesota	Clem Haskins	1996–97	35–5	31–4	Vacated 4 tournament wins and 1 tournament loss
Minnesota	Clem Haskins	1997–98	20–15	15–15	Vacated 5 NIT wins
Missouri	Norm Stewart	1993–94	28–4	25–3	Vacated 3 tournament wins and 1 tournament loss
New Mexico State	Neil McCarthy	1991–92	25–8	23–7	Vacated 2 tournament wins and 1 tournament loss
New Mexico State	Neil McCarthy	1992–93	26–8	25–7	Vacated 1 tournament win and 1 tournament loss
New Mexico State	Neil McCarthy	1993–94	23–8	23–7	Vacated 1 tournament loss
New Mexico State	Neil McCarthy	1996–97	19–9	0–0	Vacated 19 regular-season wins and 9 regular-season losses
New Mexico State	Lou Henson	1997–98	18–12	0–0	Vacated 18 regular-season wins and 12 regular-season losses
Northern Colorado	B. J. Hill	2010–11	21–11	0–0	Vacated 21 regular-season wins, 10 regular-season losses, and one tournament loss
Northern Colorado	B. J. Hill	2011–12	9–19	0–0	Vacated nine regular-season wins and 19 regular-season losses
Northern Colorado	B. J. Hill	2012–13	13–18	0–0	Vacated 13 regular-season wins and 18 regular-season losses
Northern Colorado	B. J. Hill	2013–14	18–14	0–0	Vacated 18 regular-season wins, 13 regular-season losses, and one CIT loss
Northern Colorado	B. J. Hill	2014–15	15–15	0–0	Vacated 15 regular-season wins and 15 regular-season losses
Ohio State	Jim O'Brien	1998–99	27–9	1–1	Vacated 22 regular-season wins, 7 regular-season losses, 4 tournament wins and 1 tournament loss
Ohio State	Jim O'Brien	1999–2000	23–7	11–3	Vacated 11 regular-season wins, 3 regular-season losses, 1 tournament win, and 1 tournament loss
Ohio State	Jim O'Brien	2000–01	20–11	0–0	Vacated 20 regular-season wins, 10 regular-season losses, and 1 tournament loss
Ohio State	Jim O'Brien	2001–02	24–8	0–0	Vacated 23 regular-season wins, 7 regular-season losses, 1 tournament win, and 1 tournament loss
Oregon State	Ralph Miller	1975–76	18–9	3–24	Forfeited 15 regular-season wins
Oregon State	Ralph Miller	1979–80	26–4	26–3	Vacated 1 tournament loss
Oregon State	Ralph Miller	1980–81	26–2	26–1	Vacated 1 tournament loss
Oregon State	Ralph Miller	1981–82	25–5	23–4	Vacated 2 tournament wins and 1 tournament loss
Purdue	Gene Keady	1995–96	26–6	7–23	Forfeited 18 regular-season wins; vacated 1 tournament win and 1 tournament loss
Saginaw Valley State (DII men)	Randy Baruth	2014–15	21–9	0–9	Vacated 20 regular-season and one tournament wins
Saginaw Valley State (DII men)	Randy Baruth	2015–16	25–8	0–8	Vacated 22 regular-season and three tournament wins
Saginaw Valley State (DII men)	Randy Baruth	2016–17	17–11	0–11	Vacated 17 regular-season wins
Saginaw Valley State (DII men)	Randy Baruth	2017–18	12–17	6–17	Vacated six regular-season wins
Saginaw Valley State (DII women)	Jamie Pewinski	2013–14	14–12	0–12	Vacated 14 regular-season wins
Saginaw Valley State (DII women)	Jamie Pewinski	2014–15	9–19	0–19	Vacated nine regular-season wins
St. Bonaventure	Jan van Breda Kolff	2002–03	13–14	1–14	Vacated 12 regular-season wins
St. John's	Mike Jarvis	2000–01	14–15	5–15	Vacated 9 regular-season wins
St. John's	Mike Jarvis	2001–02	20–12	7–11	Vacated 13 regular-season wins and 1 tournament loss
St. John's	Mike Jarvis	2002–03	21–13	1–13	Vacated 20 regular-season wins
St. John's	Mike Jarvis	2003–04	6–21	2–21	Vacated 4 regular-season wins
Saint Joseph's	Jack Ramsay	1960–61	25–5	22–4	Vacated 3 tournament wins and 1 tournament loss
Savannah State	Horace Broadnax	2013–14	13–19	0–19	Vacated 13 regular-season wins
Savannah State	Horace Broadnax	2014–15	9–22	6–22	Vacated three regular-season wins
Savannah State	Horace Broadnax	2017–18	15–17	5–17	Vacated 10 regular-season wins
SMU	Larry Brown	2013–14	27–10	0–10	Vacated 23 regular-season and four NIT wins
Southeast Missouri State	Scott Edgar	2007–08	12–19	1–19	Vacated 11 regular-season wins
Southern (women)	Sandy Pugh	2009–10	23–9	0–9	Vacated 23 regular-season wins
Southern (women)	Sandy Pugh	2010–11	20–12	0–12	Vacated 20 regular-season wins
Southern (women)	Sandy Pugh	2011–12	13–13	0–13	Vacated 13 regular-season wins
Southern (women)	Sandy Pugh	2012–13	13–17	0–17	Vacated 13 regular-season wins
Southern (women)	Sandy Pugh	2013–14	20–8	0–8	Vacated 20 regular-season wins
Southern (women)	Sandy Pugh	2014–15	19–12	0–12	Vacated 19 regular-season wins
Stephen F. Austin	Brad Underwood	2014–15	29–5	0–5	Vacated 29 regular-season wins
Stephen F. Austin	Brad Underwood	2015–16	28–6	0–6	Vacated 28 regular-season and tournament wins
Stephen F. Austin	Kyle Keller	2016–17	18–15	0–15	Vacated 18 regular-season wins
Stephen F. Austin	Kyle Keller	2017–18	28–7	0–7	Vacated 28 regular-season wins
Stephen F. Austin	Kyle Keller	2018–19	14–16	0–16	Vacated 14 regular-season wins
Syracuse	Jim Boeheim	2004–05	27–7	12–7	Vacated 15 regular-season and tournament wins
Syracuse	Jim Boeheim	2005–06	23–12	0–12	Vacated 23 regular-season and tournament wins
Syracuse	Jim Boeheim	2006–07	24–11	2–11	Vacated 22 regular-season and NIT wins
Syracuse	Jim Boeheim	2010–11	27–8	20–8	Vacated 7 regular-season and tournament wins
Syracuse	Jim Boeheim	2011–12	34–3	0–3	Vacated 34 regular-season and tournament wins
Texas Tech	James Dickey	1995–96	30–2	28–1	Vacated 2 tournament wins and 1 tournament loss
Thomas More (DIII women)	Jeff Hans	2014–15	33–0	0–0	Vacated 27 regular-season and six tournament wins, including national championship
UCLA	Larry Brown	1979–80	22–10	17–9	Vacated 5 tournament wins and 1 tournament loss
UCLA	Steve Lavin	1998–99	22–9	22–8	Vacated 1 tournament loss
USC	Tim Floyd	2007–08	21–12	0–11	Vacated 21 regular-season wins and 1 tournament loss
Villanova	Jack Kraft	1970–71	27–7	23–6	Vacated 4 tournament wins and 1 tournament loss
Western Kentucky	Johnny Oldham	1970–71	24–6	20–5	Vacated 4 tournament wins and 1 tournament loss

== See also ==
- Death penalty (NCAA)
- University of Southwestern Louisiana basketball scandal
