= 1995–96 Penn State Nittany Lions basketball team =

American college basketball season

1995–96 Penn State Nittany Lions men's basketball

NCAA tournament
- Conference: Big Ten Conference

Ranking
- AP: No. 18
- Record: 21–7 (12–6 Big Ten)
- Head coach: Jerry Dunn (1st season)
- Assistant coach: Frank Haith (1st season)
- Home arena: Rec Hall; Bryce Jordan Center

1995–96 Big Ten Conference men's basketball standings
	Conf.				Overall
Team	W		L	PCT	W		L	PCT
Indiana (Note: Indiana adjusted from 12–6, 19–12)	13	–	5	.722	20	–	11	.645
No. 18 Penn State	12	–	6	.667	21	–	7	.750
No. 21 Iowa (Note: Iowa adjusted from 11–7, 23–9)	12	–	6	.667	24	–	8	.750
Minnesota (Note: Minnesota adjusted from 10–8, 19–13 (vacated 2 games))	11	–	7	.611	20	–	10	.667
Wisconsin (Note: Wisconsin adjusted from 8–10, 17–15)	9	–	9	.500	18	–	14	.563
Michigan State	9	–	9	.500	16	–	16	.500
Illinois	7	–	11	.389	18	–	13	.581
No. 4 Purdue (Note: Purdue adjusted from 15–3, 26–6 (forfeit 18 wins, vacated 2 games))	6	–	12	.333	7	–	23	.233
Ohio State (Note: Ohio State adjusted from 3–15, 10–17)	5	–	13	.278	12	–	15	.444
Northwestern (Note: Northwestern adjusted from 2–16, 7–20)	4	–	14	.222	9	–	18	.333
Michigan (Note: Michigan adjusted from 10–8/21–11 (vacated 21 games))	1	–	8	.111	1	–	10	.091
Rankings from AP Poll; Records above are after NCAA sanctions against Minnesota, Purdue, and Michigan as noted:

The 1995–96 Penn State Nittany Lions basketball team represented Pennsylvania State University as a member of the Big Ten Conference during the 1995–96 season. The team was led by long-time assistant Jerry Dunn, serving in his first-year as head coach. Penn State played its home games in University Park, Pennsylvania – the first six at Rec Hall before opening the brand new Bryce Jordan Center on January 11, 1996. After winning the first 13 games of the season, the Nittany Lions climbed as high as No. 9 in the AP poll, and received an at-large bid to the NCAA tournament. Penn State lost to Arkansas in the opening round to finish the season with an overall record of 21–7 (12–6 Big Ten).

== Roster ==
1995–96 Penn State Nittany Lions men's basketball team
Players
Coaches

Pos.	#	Name	Height	Weight	Year	Hometown
G	32	Pete Lisicky	6 ft 4 in (1.93 m)	—	So	Whitehall, Pennsylvania
C	52	Calvin Booth	6 ft 11 in (2.11 m)	235 lb (107 kg)	Fr	Groveport, Ohio
F	33	Glenn Sekunda	6 ft 8 in (2.03 m)	—	Sr	{{{home}}}
G	10	Dan Earl	6 ft 4 in (1.93 m)	—	Jr	{{{home}}}
F	24	Matt Gaudio	6 ft 8 in (2.03 m)	—		{{{home}}}

Head coach

- Jerry Dunn

Assistant coach(es)

- Frank Haith

Legend

- (C) Team captain
- (S) Suspended
- (I) Ineligible
- (W) Walk-on
- Injured
- Current redshirt

== Schedule and results ==
Date time, TV	Rank^{#}	Opponent^{#}	Result	Record	Site city, state
Regular Season
Nov 25, 1995*		Morgan State	W 90–65	1–0	Rec Hall; University Park, Pennsylvania
Dec 9, 1995*		vs. Penn	W 77–65	5–0	Convention Hall; Philadelphia, Pennsylvania
Dec 29, 1995*		vs. Santa Clara; Cable Car Classic	W 70–49	8–0	San Jose Arena; San Jose, California
Dec 30, 1995*		vs. Bradley; Cable Car Classic	W 75–72	9–0	San Jose Arena; San Jose, California
Big Ten Regular Season
Jan 3, 1996		at Ohio State	W 72–69	10–0 (1–0)	St. John Arena; Columbus, Ohio
Jan 7, 1996		Wisconsin	W 79–50	11–0 (2–0)	Rec Hall; University Park, Pennsylvania
Jan 11, 1996	No. 20	Minnesota	W 76–61	12–0 (3–0)	Bryce Jordan Center (14,852); University Park, Pennsylvania
Jan 31, 1996	No. 10	at Michigan State	L 58–61	15–2 (6–2)	Breslin Student Events Center; East Lansing, Michigan
Feb 3, 1996	No. 10	at No. 16 Iowa	W 95–87 ^{OT}	16–2 (7–2)	Carver-Hawkeye Arena (15,500); Iowa City, Iowa
Mar 9, 1996	No. 16	Ohio State	W 86–70	21–6 (12–6)	Bryce Jordan Center; University Park, Pennsylvania
NCAA Tournament
Mar 14, 1996*	(5 E) No. 18	vs. (12 E) Arkansas; First Round	L 80–86	21–7	Providence Civic Center; Providence, Rhode Island
*Non-conference game. ^{#}Rankings from AP Poll. (#) Tournament seedings in parentheses. E=East. All times are in Eastern Time.

– Source:

== Rankings ==
Ranking movements Legend: ██ Increase in ranking ██ Decrease in ranking — = Not ranked
	Week																		
Poll	Pre	1	2	3	4	5	6	7	8	9	10	11	12	13	14	15	16	17	Final
AP	—	—	—	—	—	—	—	—	20	14	14	10	10	9	14	12	16	18	Not released
Coaches	—	—	—	—	—	—	—	25	22	14	14	11	10	8	12	13	17	18	—
