= 1995–96 Illinois Fighting Illini men's basketball team =

American college basketball season

1995–96 Illinois Fighting Illini men's basketball

Illini Classic, Champion

National Invitation Tournament, First Round
- Conference: Big Ten Conference
- Record: 18–13 (7–11 Big Ten)
- Head coach: Lou Henson (21st season)
- Assistant coaches: Dick Nagy (17th season); Jimmy Collins (13th season); Mark Bial (2nd season)
- MVP: Kiwane Garris
- Captains: Richard Keene; Kiwane Garris; Jerry Hester
- Home arena: Assembly Hall

1995–96 Big Ten Conference men's basketball standings
	Conf.				Overall
Team	W		L	PCT	W		L	PCT
Indiana (Note: Indiana adjusted from 12–6, 19–12)	13	–	5	.722	20	–	11	.645
No. 18 Penn State	12	–	6	.667	21	–	7	.750
No. 21 Iowa (Note: Iowa adjusted from 11–7, 23–9)	12	–	6	.667	24	–	8	.750
Minnesota (Note: Minnesota adjusted from 10–8, 19–13 (vacated 2 games))	11	–	7	.611	20	–	10	.667
Wisconsin (Note: Wisconsin adjusted from 8–10, 17–15)	9	–	9	.500	18	–	14	.563
Michigan State	9	–	9	.500	16	–	16	.500
Illinois	7	–	11	.389	18	–	13	.581
No. 4 Purdue (Note: Purdue adjusted from 15–3, 26–6 (forfeit 18 wins, vacated 2 games))	6	–	12	.333	7	–	23	.233
Ohio State (Note: Ohio State adjusted from 3–15, 10–17)	5	–	13	.278	12	–	15	.444
Northwestern (Note: Northwestern adjusted from 2–16, 7–20)	4	–	14	.222	9	–	18	.333
Michigan (Note: Michigan adjusted from 10–8/21–11 (vacated 21 games))	1	–	8	.111	1	–	10	.091
Rankings from AP Poll; Records above are after NCAA sanctions against Minnesota, Purdue, and Michigan as noted:

The 1995–96 Illinois Fighting Illini men's basketball team represented the University of Illinois.

== Regular season ==
After advancing to the NCAA Tournament in 1994–95, Illinois extended its run on postseason play with a berth in the 1996 NIT. The Illini started the 1995–96 season 11–1 before losing Kiwane Garris to injury. Without its leader, the Illini dropped its first five Big Ten games. Garris returned, but was never 100 percent and junior forward Jerry Hester missed games with a severely sprained ankle. The Illini finished the 1996 season 18–13 overall, 7–11 in the Big Ten. But more importantly the 1996 season marked the end of the most successful era in Illinois basketball when Lou Henson announced his retirement before the end of the season. In his 21 years at Illinois, Henson notched 423 victories and guided the Illini to 11 NCAA Tournament appearances. The Okay, Oklahoma native coached Illinois to 11, 20 win seasons and finished his career as the third winningest coach in Big Ten history with 214 league victories.

=== Roster ===
1995–96 Illinois Fighting Illini men's basketball team
Players
Coaches

Pos.	#	Name	Height	Weight	Year	Previous school	Hometown
G	10	Jeff Lindenmeyer	6 ft 7 in (2.01 m)	220 lb (100 kg)	Fr	Arcola High School	Arcola, Illinois
G	21	Matt Heldman	6 ft 0 in (1.83 m)	165 lb (75 kg)	So	Libertyville High School	Libertyville, Illinois
G	22	Kiwane Garris (C)	6 ft 2 in (1.88 m)	185 lb (84 kg)	Jr	Westinghouse High School	Chicago, Illinois
G	24	Richard Keene (C)	6 ft 6 in (1.98 m)	205 lb (93 kg)	Sr	Collinsville High School	Collinsville, Illinois
G	25	Bryant Notree	6 ft 5 in (1.96 m)	205 lb (93 kg)	So	Simeon High School	Chicago, Illinois
C	31	Brett Robisch	6 ft 11 in (2.11 m)	240 lb (109 kg)	RS So	Calvary Academy	Springfield, Illinois
F	32	Jarrod Gee	6 ft 8 in (2.03 m)	240 lb (109 kg)	So	St. Martin de Porres High School	Chicago, Illinois
G	33	Kevin Turner	6 ft 2 in (1.88 m)	160 lb (73 kg)	So	Simeon High School	Chicago, Illinois
F	34	Brian Johnson	6 ft 6 in (1.98 m)	195 lb (88 kg)	RS So	Maine West High School	Des Plaines, Illinois
F	40	Jerry Hester (C)	6 ft 6 in (1.98 m)	210 lb (95 kg)	Jr	Manual High School	Peoria, Illinois
F	42	Herb Caldwell	6 ft 8 in (2.03 m)	220 lb (100 kg)	Jr	Jacksonville High School	Jacksonville, Illinois
F	44	Ryan Blackwell	6 ft 8 in (2.03 m)	205 lb (93 kg)	Fr	Pittsford Sutherland High School	Pittsford, New York
F	45	Chris Gandy	6 ft 9 in (2.06 m)	205 lb (93 kg)	RS Jr	Bradley-Bourbonnais High School	Kankakee, Illinois

Head coach

- Lou Henson (New Mexico A&M) (21st year)

Assistant coach(es)

- Dick Nagy (New Mexico State University) (17th year)
- Jimmy Collins (New Mexico State University) (13th year)
- Mark Bial (University of Illinois) (2nd year)

Legend

- (C) Team captain
- (S) Suspended
- (I) Ineligible
- (W) Walk-on
- Injured
- Current redshirt

Roster

== Schedule ==
Date time, TV	Rank^{#}	Opponent^{#}	Result	Record	Site (attendance) city, state
Non-Conference regular season
11/25/1995*		Texas-San Antonio	W 83–80	1–0	Assembly Hall (12,382); Champaign, IL
11/28/1995*		Eastern Illinois	W 89–57	2–0	Assembly Hall (13,521); Champaign, IL
12/2/1995*		at No. 12 Duke	W 75–65	3–0	Cameron Indoor Stadium (9,314); Durham, NC
12/4/1995*	No. 21	Kansas State	W 82–56	4–0	Assembly Hall (13,814); Champaign, IL
12/8/1995*	No. 21	Southeast Missouri State; Illini Classic	W 89–70	5–0	Assembly Hall (14,611); Champaign, IL
12/9/1995*	No. 21	Ball State; Illini Classic	W 97–53	6–0	Assembly Hall (14,920); Champaign, IL
12/16/1995*	No. 16	Illinois-Chicago	W 81–73	7–0	Assembly Hall (15,902); Champaign, IL
12/20/1995*	No. 14	vs. No. 15 Missouri; Braggin' Rights	W 96–85 ^{ot}	8–0	Scottrade Center (21,901); St. Louis, MO
12/23/1995*	No. 14	vs. California	W 83–69	9–0	United Center (15,046); Chicago, IL
12/27/1995*	No. 12	vs. No. 13 Syracuse; Rainbow Classic	L 64–75	9–1	Stan Sheriff Center (8,757); Honolulu, HI
12/29/1995*	No. 12	at Hawaii; Rainbow Classic	W 82–81 ^{ot}	10–1	Stan Sheriff Center (7,827); Honolulu, HI
12/30/1995*	No. 12	vs. North Carolina State; Rainbow Classic	W 85–76	11–1	Assembly Hall (7,787); Champaign, IL
Big Ten regular season
1/3/1996	No. 13	at Minnesota	L 64–69	11–2 (0–1)	Williams Arena (14,221); Minneapolis, MN
1/6/1996	No. 13	Michigan State	L 58–68	11–3 (0–2)	Assembly Hall (16,413); Champaign, IL
2/26/1995	No. 21	at No. 23 Michigan	L 68–83	11–4 (0–3)	Crisler Arena (13,562); Ann Arbor, MI
1/13/1996	No. 21	Indiana; Rivalry	L 71–85	11–5 (0–4)	Assembly Hall (16,450); Champaign, IL
1/18/1996		at No. 16 Iowa; Rivalry	L 79–82	11–6 (0–5)	Carver–Hawkeye Arena (15,500); Iowa City, IA
1/20/1996		at No. 17 Purdue	W 71–67	12–6 (1–5)	Mackey Arena (14,123); West Lafayette, IN
1/24/1996		Ohio State	W 77–46	13–6 (2–5)	Assembly Hall (14,862); Champaign, IL
1/27/1996		at Northwestern; Rivalry	W 74–62	14–6 (3–5)	Welsh-Ryan Arena (8,117); Evanston, IL
2/3/1996		Wisconsin	L 56–57	14–7 (3–6)	Assembly Hall (16,450); Champaign, IL
2/8/1996		at No. 10 Penn State	L 58–61	14–8 (3–7)	Bryce Jordan Center (14,754); University Park, PA
2/14/1996		Northwestern; Rivalry	W 93–62	15–8 (4–7)	Assembly Hall (13,560); Champaign, IL
2/17/1996		at Ohio State	W 76–67	16–8 (5–7)	St. John Arena (12,718); Columbus, OH
2/20/1996		No. 7 Purdue	L 71–74	16–9 (5–8)	Assembly Hall (15,628); Champaign, IL
2/24/1996		No. 18 Iowa; Rivalry	W 91–86	17–9 (6–8)	Assembly Hall (16,450); Champaign, IL
2/28/1996		at Indiana; Rivalry	L 64–76	17–10 (6–9)	Assembly Hall (17,139); Bloomington, IN
3/3/1996		Michigan	W 73–62	18–10 (7–9)	Assembly Hall (16,450); Champaign, IL
3/6/1996		at Michigan State	L 67–77	18–11 (7–10)	Breslin Student Events Center (13,187); East Lansing, MI
3/9/1996		Minnesota	L 66–67 ^{ot}	18–12 (7–11)	Assembly Hall (16,206); Champaign, IL
National Invitation Tournament
3/13/1996*		Alabama; First Round	L 69–72	18–13	Assembly Hall (8,398); Champaign, IL
*Non-conference game. ^{#}Rankings from AP Poll. (#) Tournament seedings in parentheses. All times are in Central Time.

== Player stats ==
Player	Games Played	2 pt. Field Goals	3 pt. Field Goals	Free Throws	Rebounds	Assists	Blocks	Steals	Points
Kiwane Garris	25	80	38	112	86	98	0	42	386
Bryant Notree	31	105	17	66	190	30	5	32	327
Richard Keene	31	38	69	34	116	162	8	40	317
Jerry Hester	28	74	38	46	111	35	9	16	308
Jarrod Gee	31	115	0	35	190	16	33	17	265
Chris Gandy	31	72	4	33	126	14	16	14	189
Matt Heldman	31	23	30	33	29	43	1	11	175
Kevin Turner	31	40	25	15	49	54	3	17	170
Ryan Blackwell	30	33	6	34	86	23	6	9	118
Brett Robisch	14	14	3	3	22	6	1	2	40
Brian Johnson	20	13	0	3	23	17	1	3	29
Herb Caldwell	14	3	0	7	9	1	1	1	13
Jeff Lindenmeyer	12	4	0	0	8	0	0	1	8

== Awards and honors ==
- Kiwane Garris
  - Team Most Valuable Player

== Team players drafted into the NBA ==
Player	NBA Club	Round	Pick
