= Todd Bozeman =

American college basketball coach

Biographical details
- Born: December 5, 1963 (age 62); Washington, D.C., U.S.

Playing career
- 1982–1986: Rhode Island
- Position: Guard

Coaching career (HC unless noted)
- 1986–1987: Potomac HS (assistant)
- 1987–1988: George Mason (assistant)
- 1988–1990: Tulane (assistant)
- 1990–1993: California (assistant)
- 1993–1996: California
- 1997–1998: Vancouver Grizzlies (scout)
- 1998–2001: Toronto Raptors (scout)
- 2006–2019: Morgan State
- 2021–2022: Rhode Island (assistant)

Head coaching record
- Overall: 258–253

Accomplishments and honors

Championships
- 3 MEAC regular season (2008–2010); 2 MEAC tournament (2009, 2010)

Awards
- 3x MEAC Coach of the Year (2008–2010); Hugh Durham Award (2009)

Todd Anthony Bozeman (born December 5, 1963) is an American college basketball coach who is currently an assistant coach for Rhode Island, where he also had a collegiate playing career. He was the head men's basketball coach at Morgan State University from 2006 to 2019.

== Berkeley ==
Bozeman previously served as head coach at University of California, Berkeley from 1993 to 1996. He took over as interim coach in February 1993 when Lou Campanelli was fired with 10 games to go in the season. He led the Golden Bears to an upset of two-time defending national champion Duke in the second round of the 1993 tourney, becoming the youngest coach (29 years old) ever to take a team to the "Sweet Sixteen". Following the season, Bozeman was given the coaching job on a permanent basis. He led the Golden Bears to two more NCAA tournaments.

== Scandal and controversy ==
Bozeman was forced to resign in August 1996, just over two months before the start of the 1996–97 season. He admitted paying $30,000 over two years to the parents of Golden Bears recruit Jelani Gardner so they could drive from their home in Mendocino to see him play. When Gardner's playing time dwindled, his parents turned Bozeman in to the NCAA and Gardner eventually transferred to Pepperdine. He had also been the subject of a sexual harassment complaint; just before the announcement he had been ordered to stay away from a former Cal student who had accused him of making lewd phone calls and threatening her.

As a result of a subsequent investigation, Cal had to forfeit the entire 1994–95 season and all but two games of the 1995–96 season. The school also vacated its appearance in the 1996 NCAA Tournament, and gave up a total of four scholarships from 1998 to 2000. The NCAA imposed an eight-year "show-cause" order on Bozeman. This meant that until 2005, no NCAA member school could hire Bozeman unless it either agreed to impose sanctions on him or convinced the NCAA that he had served his punishment. The NCAA came down particularly hard on Bozeman because he'd lied to school and NCAA officials about his role in making the payments. He only came clean about the payments a week before the NCAA hearing when it became apparent that close friends would be implicated. As severe as these penalties were, the NCAA found the violations egregious enough that it would have at least considered imposing even more severe sanctions had Bozeman still been employed at Cal.

Since most schools will not even consider hiring a coach with an outstanding "show-cause" on his record, Bozeman was effectively blackballed from the college ranks for eight years. He was also hampered by rumors that he had deliberately undermined Campanelli, even though the National Association of Basketball Coaches cleared him of any wrongdoing in the events that led to Campanelli's ouster.

== After Berkeley ==
Bozeman spent four years as an NBA assistant and scout for the Vancouver Grizzlies and Toronto Raptors, and later working as representative for Pfizer pharmaceuticals and coaching AAU basketball in the Washington D.C. area. "I went from coaching a Pac-10 team to coaching 9-and-under, and having a parent tell me how to coach the team," he told Newsday.

== Morgan State ==
Bozeman returned to the collegiate ranks with Morgan State in 2006, becoming the first coach to return to Division I after being handed a show-cause. It had long been prohibitively difficult for coaches slapped with a show-cause to get back into the collegiate ranks even after the penalty expires, since many athletic directors and administrators look askance at hiring anyone with such a serious penalty on his record.

Morgan State was 4–26 the year before Bozeman arrived, but he quickly rebuilt the program and led it to new heights, making the NIT in 2008 and the school's only NCAA appearances to date in 2009 and 2010. He was a three-time MEAC conference coach of the year. In 2009 he was named Hugh Durham National Coach of the Year, which is awarded to the country's most outstanding mid-major basketball coach.

On March 20, 2019, Bozeman's contract was not renewed, ending his tenure at Morgan State after 13 seasons.

== Head coaching record ==
Record table
Season	Team	Overall	Conference	Standing	Postseason
California Golden Bears (Pacific-10 Conference) (1993–1996)
1992–93*	California	11–2*	8–1*	2nd	NCAA Division I Sweet 16
1993–94	California	22–8	13–5	T–2nd	NCAA Division I Round of 64
1994–95	California	13–14**	5–13**	T–8th	
1995–96	California	17–11**	11–7**	4th	NCAA Division I Round of 64**
California:		63–35&	37–26&		
Morgan State Bears (Mid-Eastern Athletic Conference) (2006–2019)
2006–07	Morgan State	13–18	10–8	3rd	
2007–08	Morgan State	22–11	14–2	1st	NIT first round
2008–09	Morgan State	23–12	13–3	1st	NCAA Division I Round of 64
2009–10	Morgan State	27–10	15–1	1st	NCAA Division I Round of 64
2010–11	Morgan State	17–14	10–6	3rd	
2011–12	Morgan State	9–20	6–10	10th	
2012–13	Morgan State	17–15	10–6	5th	
2013–14	Morgan State	15–16	11–5	3rd	
2014–15	Morgan State	7–24	5–11	T–11th	
2015–16	Morgan State	9–22	6–10	T–9th	
2016–17	Morgan State	14–16	11–5	T–3rd	
2017–18	Morgan State	13–19	7–9	T–7th	
2018–19	Morgan State	9–21	4–12	11th	
Morgan State:		195–218	122–88		
Total:		258–253			
National champion Postseason invitational champion Conference regular season champion Conference regular season and conference tournament champion Division regular season champion Division regular season and conference tournament champion Conference tournament champion

*Bozeman was named acting head coach in February 1993 following the firing of Lou Campanelli; California credits the first 17 games of the regular season to Campanelli and the final 13 games (including the NCAA Tournament) to Bozeman.
**Entire 1994–95 season and all but two games of 1995–96 season forfeited by NCAA after it was discovered that Jelani Gardner was ineligible. 1996 NCAA Tournament appearance was vacated. Official record for 1994–95 is 0–27 (0–18 Pac-10), official record for 1995–96 is 2–26 (2–16 Pac-10).
&Official record at California is 35–63 (23–41 Pac-10) not including forfeited and vacated games.
