= Russ Millard =

American basketball player

Personal information
- Born: March 1, 1973 (age 53) Cedar Rapids, Iowa, U.S.
- Listed height: 6 ft 8 in (2.03 m)
- Listed weight: 240 lb (109 kg)

Career information
- High school: Washington (Cedar Rapids, Iowa)
- College: Iowa (1992–1996)
- NBA draft: 1996: 2nd round, 39th overall pick
- Drafted by: Phoenix Suns
- Playing career: 1996–1998
- Position: Forward

Career history
- 1996–1998: La Crosse Bobcats
- 1997–1998: Des Moines Dragons

Career highlights
- CBA All-Rookie Second Team (1997)
- Stats at Basketball Reference
Medals
Men's basketball
Representing United States
FIBA Americas Championship
Gold medal – first place	1997 Montevideo	Team competition

Russ Dwayne Millard (born March 1, 1973) is an American former basketball player who was selected by the Phoenix Suns in the second round (39th pick overall) of the 1996 NBA draft. A 6'8" forward from University of Iowa,

== College career ==
Millard was a member of the Iowa Hawkeyes for five seasons, redshirting his true freshman season. He was named third team All-Big Ten Conference as a senior after averaging 13.7 and seven rebounds per game.

== Professional career ==
Millard was drafted by Phoenix Suns in the second round (39th pick overall) of the 1996 NBA draft, but never played in an NBA game. He signed a contract with Pallacanestro Varese to start his professional career.

Millard played for the La Crosse Bobcats of the Continental Basketball Association (CBA) from 1996 to 1998. He was selected to the CBA All-Rookie Second Team in 1997.
