= Reggie Holmes =

American basketball player

Personal information
- Born: August 8, 1987 (age 39) Baltimore, Maryland, U.S.
- Listed height: 6 ft 4 in (1.93 m)
- Listed weight: 180 lb (82 kg)

Career information
- High school: Southern (Baltimore, Maryland); St. Frances Academy (Baltimore, Maryland)
- College: Morgan State (2006–2010)
- NBA draft: 2010: undrafted
- Playing career: 2010–2019
- Position: Shooting guard

Career history
- 2010–2011: AS Salé
- 2011: Erie BayHawks
- 2011–2012: Kotwica Kołobrzeg
- 2012–2013: Beroe
- 2013–2015: Final Gençlik
- 2015: Le Mans Sarthe
- 2015–2016: Basket Brescia Leonessa
- 2016–2017: Ankara DSİ
- 2017–2018: Akhisar Belediyespor
- 2018: Kymis
- 2018–2019: Al Ahly
- 2019: Beirut Club

Career highlights
- FIBA Africa Basketball League scoring champion (2019); AP Honorable mention All-American (2010); MEAC Player of the Year (2010); 2× First-team All-MEAC (2009, 2010); MEAC tournament MVP (2009)

Reggie Holmes (born August 8, 1987) is an American former professional basketball player. A 6 ft 4 in (1.93 m) shooting guard, he is best known for his college career, where he was an All-American and Mid-Eastern Athletic Conference Player of the Year at Morgan State University.

== College career ==
Holmes came to Morgan State from Southern High School and St. Frances Academy, both in Baltimore, Maryland. He played there from 2006 to 2010, leaving as the school's all-time leading scorer with 2,049 points. As a junior, Holmes scored 20 points in the 2009 MEAC tournament final and was named tournament Most Valuable Player, leading the Bears to their first Division I NCAA tournament appearance. As a senior, Holmes again helped the Bears to a MEAC championship and an NCAA tournament bid. For the season, he averaged 21.4 points per game and at the close of the season was named conference Player of the Year and an honorable mention All-American by the Associated Press.

== Playing career ==
Following the close of his NCAA career, Holmes signed with AS Salé, later moving to the Erie BayHawks of the NBA Development League. He would also play in Poland and Bulgaria. On November 20, 2018, he joined Kymis of the Greek Basket League, but left the team a month later.

In 2018, Holmes played with Egyptian club Al Ahly in the 2018–19 FIBA Africa Basketball League, where he led the league in scoring.
