= Stanford Cardinal men's basketball statistical leaders =

The Stanford Cardinal men's basketball statistical leaders are individual statistical leaders of the Stanford Cardinal men's basketball program in various categories including points, three-pointers, assists, blocks, rebounds, and steals. Within those areas, the lists identify single-game, single-season, and career leaders. As of the next college basketball season in 2024–25, the Cardinal represent Stanford University in the NCAA Division I Atlantic Coast Conference.

Stanford began competing in intercollegiate basketball in 1913. However, the school's record book does not generally list records from before the 1950s, as records from before this period are often incomplete and inconsistent. Since scoring was much lower in this era, and teams played much fewer games during a typical season, it is likely that few or no players from this era would appear on these lists anyway.

The NCAA did not officially record assists as a stat until the 1983–84 season, and blocks and steals until the 1985–86 season, but Stanford's record books includes players in these stats before these seasons. These lists are updated through the end of the 2020–21 season.

== Scoring ==
Career
Rk	Player	Points	Seasons
1	Chasson Randle	2,375	2011–12 2012–13 2013–14 2014–15
2	Todd Lichti	2,336	1985–86 1986–87 1987–88 1988–89
3	Adam Keefe	2,319	1988–89 1989–90 1990–91 1991–92
4	Casey Jacobsen	1,723	1999–00 2000–01 2001–02
5	Brevin Knight	1,714	1993–94 1994–95 1995–96 1996–97
6	Dion Cross	1,635	1992–93 1993–94 1994–95 1995–96
7	Maxime Raynaud	1,623	2021–22 2022–23 2023–24 2024–25
8	Kimberly Belton	1,615	1976–77 1977–78 1978–79 1979–80
9	Spencer Jones	1,610	2019–20 2020–21 2021–22 2022–23 2023–24
10	Howard Wright	1,599	1985–86 1986–87 1987–88 1988–89

Season
Rk	Player	Points	Season
1	Adam Keefe	734	1991–92
2	Chasson Randle	724	2014–15
3	Ebuka Okorie	719	2025–26
4	Adam Keefe	709	1990–91
5	Maxime Raynaud	707	2024–25
6	Landry Fields	704	2009–10
7	Reid Travis	682	2017–18
8	Chasson Randle	675	2013–14
9	Todd Lichti	664	1987–88
10	Todd Lichti	663	1988–89

Single game
Rk	Player	Points	Season	Opponent
1	Hank Luisetti	50	1937–38	Duquesne
2	Casey Jacobsen	49	2001–02	Arizona State
3	Hank Luisetti	46	1937–38	Oregon
4	Tom Dose	42	1963–64	Washington State
5	Casey Jacobsen	41	2001–02	Oregon
	Kimberly Belton	41	1979–80	USC
	Claude Terry	41	1970–71	Oregon State
8	Ron Tomsic	40	1954–55	USC
	Ebuka Okorie	40	2025–26	Georgia Tech
10	Ron Tomsic	39	1952–53	Bradley

== Rebounds ==
Career
Rk	Player	Rebounds	Seasons
1	Adam Keefe	1,119	1988–89 1989–90 1990–91 1991–92
2	Tim Young	1,070	1994–95 1995–96 1996–97 1997–98 1998–99
3	Maxime Raynaud	989	2021–22 2022–23 2023–24 2024–25
4	Kimberly Belton	955	1976–77 1977–78 1978–79 1979–80
5	Rich Kelley	944	1972–73 1973–74 1974–75
6	Howard Wright	860	1985–86 1986–87 1987–88 1988–89
7	Mark Madsen	857	1996–97 1997–98 1998–99 1999–00
8	Dwight Powell	853	2010–11 2011–12 2012–13 2013–14
9	Josh Huestis	834	2010–11 2011–12 2012–13 2013–14
10	John Revelli	798	1980–81 1981–82 1982–83 1983–84

Season
Rk	Player	Rebounds	Season
1	Maxime Raynaud	371	2024–25
2	Adam Keefe	355	1991–92
3	Curtis Borchardt	332	2001–02
4	Rich Kelley	331	1972–73
5	Rich Kelley	313	1973–74
	Adam Keefe	313	1990–91
7	Josh Huestis	307	2012–13
8	Maxime Raynaud	306	2023–24
9	Ed Schweitzer	302	1975–76
10	Rich Kelley	300	1974–75

Single game
Rk	Player	Rebounds	Season	Opponent
1	Rich Kelley	27	1973–74	Kentucky
2	Rich Kelley	24	1974–75	LSU
	Kimberly Belton	24	1976–77	California
4	Adam Keefe	22	1991–92	Oregon
5	Curtis Borchardt	21	2001–02	Arizona
	Tim Young	21	1996–97	Oregon
	Adam Keefe	21	1991–92	Southern Utah
	Ed Schweitzer	21	1975–76	California
	Clayton Raaka	21	1963–64	California
10	Michael Humphrey	20	2017–18	Oklahoma State
	Matt Haryasz	20	2004–05	Oregon
	Curtis Borchardt	20	2001–02	Purdue
	Mark Madsen	20	1999–00	Washington
	Rich Kelley	20	1973–74	Utah
	Chuck Moore	20	1969–70	Wyoming
	Tom Dose	20	1962–63	Oregon State

== Assists ==
Career
Rk	Player	Assists	Seasons
1	Brevin Knight	780	1993–94 1994–95 1995–96 1996–97
2	Mitch Johnson	534	2005–06 2006–07 2007–08 2008–09
3	Keith Ramee	513	1982–83 1983–84 1984–85 1985–86
4	Terry Taylor	490	1985–86 1986–87 1987–88 1988–89
5	Marcus Lollie	474	1989–90 1990–91 1991–92 1992–93
6	Daejon Davis	429	2017–18 2018–19 2019–20 2020–21
7	Chris Hernandez	396	2001–02 2002–03 2003–04 2004–05 2005–06
8	Michael McDonald	393	1997–98 1998–99 1999–00 2000–01
9	Arthur Lee	382	1995–96 1996–97 1997–98 1998–99
10	Chasson Randle	354	2011–12 2012–13 2013–14 2014–15

Season
Rk	Player	Assists	Season
1	Brevin Knight	234	1996–97
2	Brevin Knight	212	1995–96
3	Marcus Lollie	189	1991–92
4	Mitch Johnson	188	2007–08
5	Brevin Knight	184	1994–95
6	Keith Ramee	178	1985–86
7	Michael McDonald	165	2000–01
8	Terry Taylor	161	1987–88
	Arthur Lee	161	1997–98
10	Daejon Davis	160	2017–18

Single game
Rk	Player	Assists	Season	Opponent
1	Mitch Johnson	16	2007–08	Marquette
2	Brevin Knight	13	1996–97	California
	Brevin Knight	13	1996–97	Arizona State
	Brevin Knight	13	1996–97	Alaska-Anchorage
	Brevin Knight	13	1995–96	California
	Brevin Knight	13	1994–95	USC
7	Michael O'Connell	12	2022–23	Washington
	Brevin Knight	12	1996–97	Arizona
	Brevin Knight	12	1994–95	California
	Terry Taylor	12	1986–87	Washington State
	Keith Ramee	12	1982–83	Oregon State

== Steals ==
Career
Rk	Player	Steals	Seasons
1	Brevin Knight	298	1993–94 1994–95 1995–96 1996–97
2	Keith Ramee	199	1982–83 1983–84 1984–85 1985–86
3	Chasson Randle	167	2011–12 2012–13 2013–14 2014–15
4	Todd Lichti	156	1985–86 1986–87 1987–88 1988–89
5	Spencer Jones	151	2019–20 2020–21 2021–22 2022–23 2023–24
6	Daejon Davis	147	2017–18 2018–19 2019–20 2020–21
7	Adam Keefe	141	1988–89 1989–90 1990–91 1991–92
8	Chris Hernandez	138	2001–02 2002–03 2003–04 2004–05 2005–06
9	Andrew Vlahov	130	1987–88 1988–89 1989–90 1990–91
10	Keith Jones	128	1980–81 1981–82 1982–83 1983–84

Season
Rk	Player	Steals	Season
1	Brevin Knight	83	1996–97
2	Brevin Knight	78	1994–95
3	Brevin Knight	77	1993–94
4	Brevin Knight	60	1995–96
5	Mike Bratz	59	1976–77
	Arthur Lee	59	1998–99
7	Keith Ramee	55	1984–85
	Daejon Davis	55	2019–20
9	Jaylen Blakes	54	2024–25
10	Keith Ramee	53	1985–86

Single game
Rk	Player	Steals	Season	Opponent
1	Brevin Knight	10	1993–94	McNeese State

== Blocks ==
Career
Rk	Player	Blocks	Seasons
1	Josh Huestis	190	2010–11 2011–12 2012–13 2013–14
2	Tim Young	167	1994–95 1995–96 1996–97 1997–98 1998–99
3	Robin Lopez	156	2006–07 2007–08
4	Curtis Borchardt	146	1999–00 2000–01 2001–02
5	Matt Haryasz	130	2002–03 2003–04 2004–05 2005–06
6	Josh Sharma	126	2015–16 2016–17 2017–18 2018–19
7	Howard Wright	121	1985–86 1986–87 1987–88 1988–89
	Oscar da Silva	121	2017–18 2018–19 2019–20 2020–21
9	Dwight Powell	118	2010–11 2011–12 2012–13 2013–14
10	Spencer Jones	112	2019–20 2020–21 2021–22 2022–23 2023–24

Season
Rk	Player	Blocks	Season
1	Curtis Borchardt	85	2001–02
2	Robin Lopez	83	2007–08
3	Robin Lopez	73	2006–07
4	Josh Huestis	71	2012–13
5	Josh Huestis	69	2013–14
6	Brook Lopez	56	2007–08
7	Tim Young	50	1996–97
	Maxime Raynaud	50	2024–25
9	Matt Haryasz	47	2005–06
10	Josh Childress	46	2002–03

Single game
Rk	Player	Blocks	Season	Opponent
1	Brook Lopez	12	2006–07	USC
2	Josh Huestis	10	2012–13	Seattle
3	Josh Huestis	8	2012–13	Belmont
4	Michael Humphrey	7	2015–16	Green Bay
5	Robin Lopez	6	2006–07	Siena
	Lawrence Hill	6	2005–06	Washington
	Matt Haryasz	6	2003–04	Oregon State
	Curtis Borchardt	6	2001–02	Michigan State
	Curtis Borchardt	6	2001–02	Purdue
	Curtis Borchardt	6	1999–00	CS Bakersfield
