= UCLA Bruins men's basketball statistical leaders =

The UCLA Bruins men's basketball statistical leaders are individual statistical leaders of the UCLA Bruins men's basketball program in various categories, including points, assists, blocks, rebounds, and steals. Within those areas, the lists identify single-game, single-season, and career leaders. As of the next college basketball season in 2024–25, the Bruins represent the University of California, Los Angeles in the NCAA Division I Big Ten Conference.

UCLA began competing in intercollegiate basketball in 1919. However, the school's record book does not generally list records from before the 1950s, as records from before this period are often incomplete and inconsistent. Since scoring was much lower in this era, and teams played much fewer games during a typical season, it is likely that few or no players from this era would appear on these lists anyway.

The NCAA did not officially record assists as a stat until the 1983–84 season, and blocks and steals until the 1985–86 season, but UCLA's record books includes players in these stats before these seasons. These lists are updated through the end of the 2020–21 season.

== Scoring ==
Career
Rk	Player	Points	Seasons
1	Don MacLean	2608	1988–89 1989–90 1990–91 1991–92
2	Lew Alcindor	2325	1966–67 1967–68 1968–69
3	Jason Kapono	2095	1999–00 2000–01 2001–02 2002–03
	Reggie Miller	2095	1983–84 1984–85 1985–86 1986–87
5	Bryce Alford	1922	2013–14 2014–15 2015–16 2016–17
6	Toby Bailey	1846	1994–95 1995–96 1996–97 1997–98
7	Ed O'Bannon	1815	1991–92 1992–93 1993–94 1994–95
8	Jaime Jaquez, Jr.	1802	2019–20 2020–21 2021–22 2022–23
9	J.R. Henderson	1801	1994–95 1995–96 1996–97 1997–98
10	Trevor Wilson	1798	1986–87 1987–88 1988–89 1989–90

Season
Rk	Player	Points	Season
1	Lew Alcindor	870	1966–67
2	Reggie Miller	750	1985–86
3	Gail Goodrich	744	1964–65
4	Lew Alcindor	734	1967–68
5	Lew Alcindor	721	1968–69
6	Don MacLean	714	1990–91
7	Reggie Miller	712	1986–87
8	Tracy Murray	706	1991–92
9	Kevin Love	681	2007–08
10	Tracy Murray	679	1990–91

Single game
Rk	Player	Points	Season	Opponent
1	Lew Alcindor	61	1966–67	Washington State
2	Lew Alcindor	56	1966–67	USC
3	Lew Alcindor	45	1966–67	Illinois
	Lew Alcindor	45	1967–68	Iowa State
5	Lew Alcindor	44	1967–68	California
	Jason Kapono	44	2002–03	Washington State
	Bill Walton	44	1972–73	Memphis State
8	Reggie Miller	42	1986–87	Louisville
	Gail Goodrich	42	1964–65	Michigan
10	Don MacLean	41	1988–89	North Texas
	Reggie Miller	41	1985–86	Oregon State

== Rebounds ==
Career
Rk	Player	Rebounds	Seasons
1	Bill Walton	1370	1971–72 1972–73 1973–74
2	Lew Alcindor	1367	1966–67 1967–68 1968–69
3	Thomas Welsh	1035	2014–15 2015–16 2016–17 2017–18
4	David Greenwood	1022	1975–76 1976–77 1977–78 1978–79
5	Trevor Wilson	1001	1986–87 1987–88 1988–89 1989–90
6	Don MacLean	992	1988–89 1989–90 1990–91 1991–92
7	Willie Naulls	900	1953–54 1954–55 1955–56
8	Marques Johnson	897	1973–74 1974–75 1975–76 1976–77
9	Dan Gadzuric	896	1998–99 1999–00 2000–01 2001–02
10	Sidney Wicks	894	1968–69 1969–70 1970–71

Season
Rk	Player	Rebounds	Season
1	Bill Walton	506	1972–73
2	Bill Walton	466	1971–72
	Lew Alcindor	466	1966–67
4	Lew Alcindor	461	1967–68
5	Lew Alcindor	440	1968–69
6	Kevin Love	415	2007–08
7	Willie Naulls	410	1955–56
8	Bill Walton	398	1973–74
9	Sidney Wicks	384	1970–71
10	Thomas Welsh	358	2017–18

Single game
Rk	Player	Rebounds	Season	Opponent
1	Willie Naulls	28	1955–56	Arizona State
2	Bill Walton	27	1973–74	Maryland
	Bill Walton	27	1972–73	Loyola (Chicago)
4	Bill Walton	24	1972–73	Providence
	Bill Walton	24	1971–72	Washington
	Bill Walton	24	1971–72	Texas
	Lew Alcindor	24	1966–67	Washington State
	Lew Alcindor	24	1966–67	Georgia Tech
9	David Greenwood	23	1977–78	Washington
	David Greenwood	23	1976–77	Tulsa
	Lew Alcindor	23	1967–68	New Mexico State
	Lew Alcindor	23	1966–67	Oregon State
	Lew Alcindor	23	1966–67	UC Santa Barbara

== Assists ==
Career
Rk	Player	Assists	Seasons
1	Pooh Richardson	833	1985–86 1986–87 1987–88 1988–89
2	Tyger Campbell	655	2019–20 2020–21 2021–22 2022–23
3	Tyus Edney	652	1991–92 1992–93 1993–94 1994–95
4	Darrick Martin	636	1988–89 1989–90 1990–91 1991–92
5	Earl Watson	607	1997–98 1998–99 1999–00 2000–01
6	Darren Collison	577	2005–06 2006–07 2007–08 2008–09
7	Bryce Alford	537	2013–14 2014–15 2015–16 2016–17
8	Ralph Jackson	523	1980–81 1981–82 1982–83 1983–84
9	Roy Hamilton	512	1975–76 1976–77 1977–78 1978–79
10	Aaron Holiday	477	2015–16 2016–17 2017–18

Season
Rk	Player	Assists	Season
1	Lonzo Ball	274	2016–17
2	Donovan Dent	265	2025–26
3	Larry Drew II	256	2012–13
4	Pooh Richardson	236	1988–89
5	Kyle Anderson	233	2013–14
6	Darrick Martin	217	1990–91
7	Tyus Edney	216	1994–95
8	Pooh Richardson	210	1987–88
9	Pooh Richardson	208	1986–87
10	Jaylen Hands	201	2018–19
	Roy Hamilton	201	1978–79

Single game
Rk	Player	Assists	Season	Opponent
1	Earl Watson	16	1999–00	Maryland
2	Donovan Dent	15	2025–26	Minnesota
	Donovan Dent	15	2025–26	Illinois
	Darren Collison	15	2006–07	Arizona
	Darrick Martin	15	1990–91	Pittsburgh
6	Tyger Campbell	14	2019–20	Arizona State
	Lonzo Ball	14	2016–17	Washington State
	Pooh Richardson	14	1988–89	Iowa State
	Pooh Richardson	14	1986–87	St. John's
	Pooh Richardson	14	1986–87	Pepperdine
	Roy Hamilton	14	1977–78	Michigan
	Andre McCarter	14	1974–75	Kentucky

== Steals ==
Career
Rk	Player	Steals	Seasons
1	Earl Watson	235	1997–98 1998–99 1999–00 2000–01
2	Darren Collison	231	2005–06 2006–07 2007–08 2008–09
3	Tyus Edney	224	1991–92 1992–93 1993–94 1994–95
4	Cameron Dollar	214	1993–94 1994–95 1995–96 1996–97
5	Pooh Richardson	189	1985–86 1986–87 1987–88 1988–89
6	Darrick Martin	179	1988–89 1989–90 1990–91 1991–92
	Josh Shipp	179	2004–05 2005–06 2006–07 2007–08 2008–09
8	Jaime Jaquez Jr.	178	2019–20 2020–21 2021–22 2022–23
9	Jordan Adams	168	2012–13 2013–14
10	Reggie Miller	158	1983–84 1984–85 1985–86 1986–87
	Norman Powell	158	2011–12 2012–13 2013–14 2014–15

Season
Rk	Player	Steals	Season
1	Jordan Adams	95	2013–14
2	Cameron Dollar	82	1996–97
3	Darren Collison	78	2006–07
	Jaylen Clark	78	2022–23
5	Baron Davis	77	1997–98
6	Tyus Edney	74	1994–95
7	Jordan Adams	73	2012–13
8	Baron Davis	68	1998–99
9	Norman Powell	66	2014–15
	Lonzo Ball	66	2016–17

Single game
Rk	Player	Steals	Season	Opponent
1	Tyus Edney	11	1994–95	George Mason
2	Kenny Fields	10	1982–83	Maryland
3	Darren Collison	9	2006–07	Long Beach State
4	Jordan Adams	8	2013–14	Sacramento State
	Earl Watson	8	2000–01	Arizona State
	Baron Davis	8	1997–98	Northern Arizona
7	Jaylen Clark	7	2022–23	Sacramento State
	Jordan Adams	7	2012–13	Stanford
	Luc Mbah a Moute	7	2006–07	Michigan
	Earl Watson	7	1997–98	Northern Arizona
	Cameron Dollar	7	1996–97	California
	Cameron Dollar	7	1996–97	Cal State Northridge
	Tyus Edney	7	1994–95	Oregon
	Tracy Murray	7	1991–92	Oregon State
	Pooh Richardson	7	1987–88	USC

== Blocks ==
Career
Rk	Player	Blocks	Seasons
1	Jelani McCoy	188	1995–96 1996–97 1997–98
2	Dan Gadzuric	184	1998–99 1999–00 2000–01 2001–02
3	Thomas Welsh	143	2014–15 2015–16 2016–17 2017–18
4	Charles O'Bannon	118	1993–94 1994–95 1995–96 1996–97
5	Lorenzo Mata-Real	117	2004–05 2005–06 2006–07 2007–08
6	Adem Bona	115	2022–23 2023–24
7	Ryan Hollins	101	2002–03 2003–04 2004–05 2005–06
8	Tyler Honeycutt	99	2009–10 2010–11
9	Rodney Zimmerman	97	1990–91 1991–92 1992–93 1993–94
10	Ed O'Bannon	95	1991–92 1992–93 1993–94 1994–95

Season
Rk	Player	Blocks	Season
1	Jelani McCoy	102	1995–96
2	David Greenwood	76	1978–79
3	Tyler Honeycutt	68	2010–11
4	Moses Brown	62	2018–19
5	Jelani McCoy	61	1996–97
	Keith Owens	61	1990–91
7	Dan Gadzuric	60	2000–01
8	Richard Petruska	58	1992–93
	Adem Bona	58	2023–24
10	Adem Bona	57	2022–23

Single game
Rk	Player	Blocks	Season	Opponent
1	Jelani McCoy	11	1995–96	Maryland
2	Moses Brown	8	2018–19	St. Francis Univ. (Pa.)
	Tyler Honeycutt	8	2010–11	Oregon State
	David Greenwood	8	1978–79	Boston College
5	Adem Bona	7	2023–24	Arizona State
	Kevin Love	7	2007–08	Texas A&M
	Ryan Hollins	7	2002–03	Oregon
	Jelani McCoy	7	1995–96	Washington
	Jelani McCoy	7	1995–96	Arizona
10	Jelani McCoy	6	1995–96	Arizona State
	Jelani McCoy	6	1995–96	Santa Clara
	David Greenwood	6	1978–79	Stanford
