= Arizona Wildcats men's basketball statistical leaders =

The Arizona Wildcats men's basketball statistical leaders are individual statistical leaders of the Arizona Wildcats men's basketball program in various categories, including points, rebounds, assists, steals, and blocks. Within those areas, the lists identify single-game, single-season, and career leaders. As of the next college basketball season in 2024–25, the Wildcats represent the University of Arizona in the NCAA Division I Big 12 Conference.

Arizona began competing in intercollegiate basketball in 1904. However, the school's record book does not generally list records from before the 1950s, as records from before this period are often incomplete and inconsistent. Since scoring was much lower in this era, and teams played much fewer games during a typical season, it is likely that few or no players from this era would appear on these lists anyway.

The NCAA did not officially record assists as a stat until the 1983–84 season, and blocks and steals until the 1985–86 season, but Arizona's record books includes players in these stats before these seasons. These lists are updated through the end of the 2025–26 season.

== Scoring ==
Career
Rk	Player	Points	Seasons
1	Sean Elliott	2,555	1985–86 1986–87 1987–88 1988–89
2	Bob Elliott	2,131	1973–74 1974–75 1975–76 1976–77
3	Jason Gardner	1,984	1999–00 2000–01 2001–02 2002–03
4	Salim Stoudamire	1,960	2001–02 2002–03 2003–04 2004–05
5	Khalid Reeves	1,925	1990–91 1991–92 1992–93 1993–94
6	Damon Stoudamire	1,849	1991–92 1992–93 1993–94 1994–95
7	Hassan Adams	1,818	2002–03 2003–04 2004–05 2005–06
8	Michael Dickerson	1,791	1994–95 1995–96 1996–97 1997–98
9	Channing Frye	1,789	2001–02 2002–03 2003–04 2004–05
10	Al Fleming	1,765	1972–73 1973–74 1974–75 1975–76

Season
Rk	Player	Points	Season
1	Khalid Reeves	848	1993–94
2	Sean Elliott	743	1987–88
3	Derrick Williams	741	2010–11
4	Sean Elliott	735	1988–89
5	Deandre Ayton	704	2017–18
6	Ąžuolas Tubelis	694	2022–23
7	Jason Gardner	692	2001–02
8	Damon Stoudamire	684	1994–95
9	Bob Elliott	677	1974–75
10	Salim Stoudamire	662	2004–05

Single game
Rk	Player	Points	Season	Opponent
1	Ernie McCray	46	1959–60	Cal State Los Angeles
2	Damon Stoudamire	45	1994–95	Stanford
3	Coniel Norman	44	1973–74	BYU
3	Joe Skaisgir	44	1961–62	Hardin-Simmons
5	Al Fleming	41	1975–76	Detroit
6	Ąžuolas Tubelis	40	2022–23	Oregon
6	Damon Stoudamire	40	1994–95	Washington State
6	Khalid Reeves	40	1993–94	Michigan
9	Jerryd Bayless	39	2007–08	Arizona State
9	Bob Elliott	39	1974–75	Utah
9	Al Fleming	39	1974–75	San Diego State

== Rebounds ==
Career
Rk	Player	Rebounds	Seasons
1	Al Fleming	1,190	1972–73 1973–74 1974–75 1975–76
2	Bob Elliott	1,083	1973–74 1974–75 1975–76 1976–77
3	Channing Frye	975	2001–02 2002–03 2003–04 2004–05
4	Kaleb Tarczewski	879	2012–13 2013–14 2014–15 2015–16
5	Anthony Cook	861	1985–86 1986–87 1987–88 1988–89
6	Bill Reeves	837	1954–55 1955–56 1956–57
7	Michael Wright	832	1998–99 1999–00 2000–01
8	Oumar Ballo	830	2021–22 2022–23 2023–24
9	Ernie McCray	824	1957–58 1958–59 1959–60
10	A.J. Bramlett	817	1995–96 1996–97 1997–98 1998–99

Season
Rk	Player	Rebounds	Season
1	Deandre Ayton	405	2017–18
2	Jordan Hill	375	2008–09
3	Leo Johnson	373	1950–51
4	Oumar Ballo	365	2023–24
5	Tobe Awaka	353	2025–26
6	Bill Reeves	343	1955–56
6	Al Fleming	343	1974–75
8	Bob Elliott	341	1975–76
9	Ryan Anderson	334	2015–16
10	Al Fleming	329	1975–76

Single game
Rk	Player	Rebounds	Season	Opponent
1	Bill Reeves	26	1955–56	UC-Santa Barbara
1	Joe Skaisgir	26	1961–62	Cal State-Los Angeles
3	Bob Elliott	25	1973–74	Arizona State
3	Kenney Davis	25	1976–77	Arizona State
5	Leo Johnson	23	1950–51	San Jose State
5	Al Fleming	23	1972–73	San Diego
5	Al Fleming	23	1975–76	Old Dominion
8	Ernie McCray	22	1957–58	Cal State-LA
8	Jordan Hill	22	2008–09	UAB
10	Oumar Ballo	21	2023–24	Florida Atlantic
10	Albert Johnson	21	1962–63	Idaho State
10	Al Fleming	21	1974–75	Columbia

== Assists ==
Career
Rk	Player	Assists	Seasons
1	Russell Brown	810	1977–78 1978–79 1979–80 1980–81
2	Mustafa Shakur	670	2003–04 2004–05 2005–06 2006–07
3	Damon Stoudamire	663	1991–92 1992–93 1993–94 1994–95
4	Jason Gardner	622	1999–00 2000–01 2001–02 2002–03
5	Luke Walton	582	1999–00 2000–01 2001–02 2002–03
6	Reggie Geary	560	1992–93 1993–94 1994–95 1995–96
7	Matt Othick	552	1988–89 1989–90 1990–91 1991–92
8	Jason Terry	493	1995–96 1996–97 1997–98 1998–99
9	Parker Jackson-Cartwright	459	2014–15 2015–16 2016–17 2017–18
10	Matt Muehlebach	458	1987–88 1988–89 1989–90 1990–91

Season
Rk	Player	Assists	Season
1	Russell Brown	247	1978–79
2	T. J. McConnell	238	2014–15
3	Reggie Geary	231	1995–96
4	Damon Stoudamire	220	1994–95
5	Mustafa Shakur	215	2006–07
6	Damon Stoudamire	208	1993–94
7	T. J. McConnell	202	2013–14
8	Russell Brown	200	1979–80
9	Mike Bibby	199	1997–98
10	Russell Brown	197	1977–78

Single game
Rk	Player	Assists	Season	Opponent
1	Russell Brown	19	1979–80	Grand Canyon
2	Russell Brown	17	1978–79	California
3	Russell Brown	15	1977–78	Utah
3	Russell Brown	15	1978–79	Southwestern Louisiana
3	Russell Brown	15	1979–80	Midwestern
6	Matt Othick	14	1991–92	Northern Arizona
6	Damon Stoudamire	14	1994–95	Oregon
8	Eric Money	13	1973–74	Brigham Young
8	Gilbert Myles	13	1974–75	Purdue
8	Russell Brown	13	1977–78	Wyoming
8	Russell Brown	13	1978–79	Stanford
8	Russell Brown	13	1979–80	Oregon State
8	Russell Brown	13	1980–81	UCLA
8	Reggie Geary	13	1995–96	Iowa
8	Mike Bibby	13	1997–98	Morgan State

== Steals ==
Career
Rk	Player	Steals	Seasons
1	Jason Terry	245	1995–96 1996–97 1997–98 1998–99
2	Hassan Adams	238	2002–03 2003–04 2004–05 2005–06
3	Jason Gardner	225	1999–00 2000–01 2001–02 2002–03
4	Reggie Geary	208	1992–93 1993–94 1994–95 1995–96
5	Ken Lofton	200	1985–86 1986–87 1987–88 1988–89
6	Khalid Reeves	187	1990–91 1991–92 1992–93 1993–94
7	Russell Brown	177	1977–78 1978–79 1979–80 1980–81
8	Damon Stoudamire	174	1991–92 1992–93 1993–94 1994–95
9	Nic Wise	167	2006–07 2007–08 2008–09 2009–10
10	Mike Bibby	164	1996–97 1997–98

Season
Rk	Player	Steals	Season
1	Mike Bibby	87	1997–98
2	Jason Terry	85	1996–97
3	T. J. McConnell	83	2014–15
4	Hassan Adams	82	2005–06
5	Jason Terry	80	1998–99
6	Mike Bibby	76	1996–97
7	Gilbert Arenas	71	1999–00
8	Hassan Adams	69	2004–05
9	Nick Johnson	68	2012–13
10	Ken Lofton	67	1988–89
10	Reggie Geary	67	1995–96

Single game
Rk	Player	Steals	Season	Opponent
1	Bennett Davison	9	1997–98	Stanford
2	Mike Bibby	8	1996–97	Texas
2	TJ McConnell	8	2014–15	Oregon State
4	Jason Gardner	7	1999–00	UCLA
4	Jaden Bradley	7	2024–25	Iowa State

== Blocks ==
Career
Rk	Player	Blocks	Seasons
1	Anthony Cook	278	1985–86 1986–87 1987–88 1988–89
2	Channing Frye	258	2001–02 2002–03 2003–04 2004–05
3	Loren Woods	186	1999–00 2000–01
4	Ed Stokes	167	1989–90 1990–91 1991–92 1992–93
5	Christian Koloko	162	2019–20 2020–21 2021–22
6	Sean Rooks	142	1988–89 1989–90 1990–91 1991–92
7	Jordan Hill	140	2006–07 2007–08 2008–09
8	Oumar Ballo	134	2021–22 2022–23 2023–24
9	Kaleb Tarczewski	117	2012–13 2013–14 2014–15 2015–16
10	Motiejus Krivas	113	2023–24 2024–25 2025–26 2026–27

Season
Rk	Player	Blocks	Season
1	Christian Koloko	102	2021–22
1	Loren Woods	102	1999–00
3	Channing Frye	85	2004–05
4	Anthony Cook	84	1988–89
4	Loren Woods	84	2000–01
6	Anthony Cook	75	1987–88
7	Motiejus Krivas	73	2025–26
8	Anthony Cook	69	1986–87
9	Deandre Ayton	66	2017–18
10	Channing Frye	63	2003–04

Single game
Rk	Player	Blocks	Season	Opponent
1	Loren Woods	14	1999–00	Oregon
2	Loren Woods	10	2000–01	Washington
3	Channing Frye	7	2004–05	Oregon
3	Anthony Cook	7	1986–87	UTEP
3	Loren Woods	7	2000–01	Illinois
6	Channing Frye	6	2004–05	Illinois
6	Jordan Hill	6	2007–08	Washingtoin State
6	Jordan Hill	6	2008–09	San Diego State
6	Deandre Ayton	6	2017–18	Stanford
6	Motiejus Krivas	6	2025–26	South Dakota State
6	Motiejus Krivas	6	2025–26	Kansas
6	Motiejus Krivas	6	2026–27	UCLA

== Triple Doubles ==
Career
Player	Date	Points	Rebounds	Assists	Blocks	Steals	Opponent	Seasons
Matt Muehlebach	3/9/1990	10	11	10	0	2	USC	1989–90
Chris Mills	12/18/1991	19	10	10	1	1	Northern Arizona	1991–92
Damon Stoudamire	2/25/1995	32	12	14	0	1	Oregon	1994–95
Loren Woods	2/3/2000	16	10	2	14	0	Oregon	1999–00
Loren Woods	1/13/2001	13	10	1	10	0	Washington	2000–01
Luke Walton	1/17/2002	27	11	10	4	4	USC	2001–02
Andre Iguodala	12/9/2003	13	10	10	2	1	Texas	2003–04
Andre Iguodala	12/28/2003	13	11	11	1	5	Liberty	2003–04
Andre Iguodala	2/14/2004	14	11	10	0	5	UCLA	2003–04
Kerr Kriisa	2/24/2022	21	10	10	0	0	Utah	2021–22
Kerr Kriisa	11/11/2022	14	11	12	0	0	Southern	2022–23

== 1,000 Point Club ==
As of the start of the 2026–27 Arizona season, 57 players have scored at least 1,000 points for the University of Arizona Men's Basketball team. Link Richmond was the first Arizona player to reach 1,000 total points and Jaden Bradley is the most recent player.

Career
Rk	Player	Points	Games	Avg.
1	Sean Elliott	2,555	133	19.2
2	Bob Elliott	2,131	114	18.7
3	Jason Gardner	1,984	136	14.6
4	Salim Stoudamire	1,960	129	15.2
5	Khalid Reeves	1,925	128	15.0
6	Damon Stoudamire	1,849	123	15.0
7	Hassan Adams	1,818	130	14.0
8	Michael Dickerson	1,791	130	13.8
9	Channing Frye	1,789	133	13.5
10	Al Fleming	1,765	114	15.5
11	Chase Budinger	1,697	100	17.0
12	Miles Simon	1,664	114	14.6
13	Chris Mills	1,619	94	17.2
14	Anthony Cook	1,590	133	12.0
15	Ąžuolas Tubelis	1,510	97	15.6
16	Sean Rooks	1,497	129	11.6
17	Michael Wright	1,491	99	15.1
18	Bill Warner	1,462	78	18.7
19	Jason Terry	1,461	129	11.3

Career
Rk	Player	Points	Games	Avg.
20	Steve Kerr	1,445	129	10.4
21	Solomon Hill	1,430	139	10.3
22	Joe Nehls	1,409	84	16.8
23	Ernie McCray	1,349	76	17.8
24	Kyle Fogg	1,341	139	9.6
25	Nick Johnson	1,333	108	12.3
26	Frank Smith	1,329	109	12.2
27	Mustafa Shakur	1,31 8	131	10.1
28	Allonzo Trier	1,307	78	16.8
29	Ivan Radenovic	1,300	122	10.7
30	Caleb Love	1,286	72	17.9
31	Nic Wise	1,285	115	11.2
32	Link Richmond	1,246	118	10.6
33	Derrick Williams	1,227	69	17.8
34	Ed Nymeyer	1,225	78	15.7
35	Jaden Bradley	1,215	112	10.8
36	Oumar Ballo	1,213	108	11.2
37	Jordan Hill	1,208	97	12.5
38	Coniel Norman	1,194	50	23.9

Career
Rk	Player	Points	Games	Avg.
39	Kaleb Tarczewski	1,185	135	8.8
40	Dušan Ristić	1,181	141	8.4
41	Luke Walton	1,179	129	9.1
42	Ray Owes	1,178	120	9.8
43	Craig McMillan	1,174	130	8.4
44	Herman Harris	1,158	93	12.5
45	Jud Buechler	1,144	131	8.7
46	Gabe York	1,143	124	9.2
47	Phil Taylor	1,127	106	11.1
48	Gilbert Arenas	1,105	70	15.8
49	A.J. Bramlett	1,098	127	8.6
50	Albert Johnson	1,090	78	13.9
51	Joseph Blair	1,086	104	10.4
52	Pelle Larsson	1,073	108	9.9
53	Mike Bibby	1,061	69	15.4
54	Matt Othick	1,055	129	8.2
55	Roger Johnson	1,046	85	12.3
56	Joe Skaisgir	1,034	52	19.8
57	Matt Muehlebach	1,006	128	7.9
