= 1995–96 Stanford Cardinal men's basketball team =

American college basketball season

1995–96 Stanford Cardinal men's basketball

NCAA tournament, second round
- Conference: Pacific-10 Conference
- Record: 21–8 (13–5 Pac-10)
- Head coach: Mike Montgomery (10th season)
- Assistant coaches: Doug Oliver; Jeff Jackson
- Home arena: Maples Pavilion (Capacity: 7,392)

1995–96 Pacific-10 Conference men's basketball standings
	Conf.				Overall
Team	W		L	PCT	W		L	PCT
No. 14 UCLA	16	–	2	.889	23	–	8	.742
No. 11 Arizona	14	–	4	.778	27	–	6	.818
Stanford	12	–	6	.667	21	–	8	.724
Washington State	9	–	9	.500	18	–	11	.621
Washington	9	–	9	.500	16	–	12	.571
Oregon	9	–	9	.500	16	–	13	.552
USC	6	–	12	.333	13	–	17	.433
Arizona State	6	–	12	.333	11	–	16	.407
Oregon State	4	–	14	.222	6	–	21	.222
California^{1}	2	–	16	.111	2	–	26	.071
As of November 23, 2011; Rankings from AP Poll^{1}California forfeited games due to infractions.

The 1995–96 Stanford Cardinal men's basketball team represented Stanford University as a member of the Pac-10 Conference during the 1995–96 NCAA Division I men's basketball season. The team was led by head coach Mike Montgomery and played their home games at Maples Pavilion. Stanford finished third in the Pac-10 regular season standings and received an at-large bid to the 1996 NCAA tournament. Playing as the No. 9 seed in the East region, the Cardinal defeated No. 8 seed Bradley in the opening round before falling to No. 1 UMass in the second round for the second straight season. Stanford finished with an overall record of 20–9 (12–6 Pac-10; later adjusted to 21–8 overall and 13–5 Pac-10).

== Roster ==
1995–96 Stanford Cardinal men's basketball team
Players
Coaches

Pos.	#	Name	Height	Weight	Year	Previous school	Hometown
G	3	Kris Weems	6 ft 2 in (1.88 m)	—	Fr		Kansas City, KS
G	4	Dion Cross	6 ft 2 in (1.88 m)	—	Sr
F	5	Peter Sauer	6 ft 7 in (2.01 m)	—	Fr		Pittsburgh, PA
	10	Mark Thompson (redshirt)	—	—	So		Los Angeles, CA
G	11	Arthur Lee	6 ft 1 in (1.85 m)	—	Fr		Los Angeles, CA
G	22	Brevin Knight	5 ft 10 in (1.78 m)	170 lb (77 kg)	Jr	Seton Hall Prep	Livingston, NJ
F	24	Rich Jackson	6 ft 6 in (1.98 m)	—	Jr		Provo, UT
G	25	David Harbour	6 ft 3 in (1.91 m)	—	Sr
F	30	Darren Allaway (C)	6 ft 8 in (2.03 m)	—	Sr
F	32	Andy Popink (C)	6 ft 7 in (2.01 m)	—	RS Sr
F	34	Karl Wente	6 ft 7 in (2.01 m)	—	Fr
G	35	Kamba Tshionyi	6 ft 2 in (1.88 m)	—	So		Eugene, OR
F	44	Mark Seaton	6 ft 9 in (2.06 m)	—	Fr		Cypress, CA
C	55	Tim Young	7 ft 0 in (2.13 m)	220 lb (100 kg)	Fr	Harbor	Santa Cruz, CA

Head coach

- Mike Montgomery (Long Beach State)

Assistant coach(es)

- Doug Oliver (San José State)
- Jeff Jackson (Cornell)

Legend

- (C) Team captain
- (S) Suspended
- (I) Ineligible
- (W) Walk-on
- Injured
- Current redshirt

Roster

== Schedule and results ==
Date time, TV	Rank^{#}	Opponent^{#}	Result	Record	Site (attendance) city, state
Regular season
Nov 24, 1995*	No. 18	Stetson; Fry's Invitational	W 92–60	1–0	Maples Pavilion; Stanford, California
Nov 25, 1995*	No. 18	Rice; Fry's Invitational	W 75–64	2–0	Maples Pavilion; Stanford, California
Nov 28, 1995*	No. 16	vs. San Francisco	L 58–59	2–1	War Memorial Gymnasium; San Francisco, California
Dec 1, 1995*	No. 16	vs. South Carolina; Diet Pepsi Tournament of Champions	W 82–70	3–1	Charlotte Coliseum; Charlotte, North Carolina
Dec 2, 1995*	No. 16	at No. 17 North Carolina; Diet Pepsi Tournament of Champions	L 63–87	3–2	Charlotte Coliseum; Charlotte, North Carolina
Dec 22, 1995*		at Navy	W 80–62	4–2	Alumni Hall; Annapolis, Maryland
Dec 28, 1995*		American	W 80–52	5–2	Maples Pavilion; Stanford, California
Dec 30, 1995*		Harvard	W 65–59	6–2	Maples Pavilion; Stanford, California
Jan 4, 1996		Arizona State	W 83–70	7–2 (1–0)	Maples Pavilion; Stanford, California
Jan 6, 1996		No. 9 Arizona	W 80–71	8–2 (2–0)	Maples Pavilion; Stanford, California
Jan 11, 1996	No. 24	at No. 17 UCLA	L 56–64	8–3 (2–1)	Pauley Pavilion; Los Angeles, California
Jan 14, 1996	No. 24	at USC	L 80–84	8–4 (2–2)	L.A. Sports Arena; Los Angeles, California
Jan 18, 1996		Oregon	W 94–74	9–4 (3–2)	Maples Pavilion; Stanford, California
Jan 20, 1996		Oregon State	W 84–51	10–4 (4–2)	Maples Pavilion; Stanford, California
Jan 25, 1996		at Washington	L 71–74	10–5 (4–3)	Hec Edmundson Pavilion; Seattle, Washington
Jan 27, 1996		at Washington State	W 78–67	11–5 (5–3)	Beasley Coliseum; Pullman, Washington
Jan 31, 1996		California	W 93–79	12–5 (6–3)	Maples Pavilion; Stanford, California
Feb 4, 1996*		vs. Seton Hall	W 83–60	13–5	San Jose Arena; San Jose, California
Feb 8, 1996	No. 25	USC	W 99–69	14–5 (7–3)	Maples Pavilion; Stanford, California
Feb 10, 1996	No. 25	No. 17 UCLA	W 67–66	15–5 (8–3)	Maples Pavilion; Stanford, California
Feb 15, 1996	No. 20	at Oregon State	W 65–50	16–5 (9–3)	Gill Coliseum; Corvallis, Oregon
Feb 17, 1996	No. 20	at Oregon	L 62–64	16–6 (9–4)	McArthur Court; Eugene, Oregon
Feb 22, 1996	No. 24	Washington State	L 59–68	16–7 (9–5)	Maples Pavilion; Stanford, California
Feb 24, 1996	No. 24	Washington	W 71–56	17–7 (10–5)	Maples Pavilion; Stanford, California
Mar 3, 1996	No. 25	at California	L 69–85	17–8 (10–6)	Harmon Gym; Berkeley, California
Mar 7, 1996		at No. 11 Arizona	W 85–79	18–8 (11–6)	McKale Center; Tucson, Arizona
Mar 9, 1996		at Arizona State	W 67–53	19–8 (12–6)	Desert Financial Arena; Tempe, Arizona
NCAA tournament
Mar 14, 1996*	(9 E)	vs. (8 E) Bradley; First Round	W 66–58	20–8	Providence Civic Center; Providence, Rhode Island
Mar 16, 1996*	(9 E)	vs. (1 E) No. 1 UMass; Second Round	L 74–79	20–9	Providence Civic Center (11,931); Providence, Rhode Island
*Non-conference game. ^{#}Rankings from AP Poll. (#) Tournament seedings in parentheses. E=East. All times are in Pacific Time. (#) during NCAA is seed within region.

Schedule Source:

== Rankings ==
Ranking movements Legend: ██ Increase in ranking ██ Decrease in ranking RV = Received votes т = Tied with team above or below
	Week																			
Poll	Pre	1	2	3	4	5	6	7	8	9	10	11	12	13	14	15	16	17	18	Final
AP	18	18*	18	16	24	RV	RV	RV	RV	24	RV	RV	RV	25	20	24	25	RV	RV	Not released
Coaches	16т	16т*	18	15	23	RV	RV	RV	RV	24	24	25	24	24	20	23	24	24	25	RV

*Coaches and AP Poll did not release a week 1 poll.

== Awards and honors ==
Team honors
Honors	Player	Position	Ref.
The Hank Luisetti MVP	Brevin Knight	G	
Howie Dallmar Coaches Award	Rich Jackson	F	
Most Inspirational Player	Rich Jackson	F	
Most Improved Player	Mark Seaton	F	
Best Defensive Player	Darren Allaway	F	
