= 1991–92 USC Trojans men's basketball team =

American college basketball season

1991–92 USC Trojans men's basketball

NCAA tournament, second round
- Conference: Pacific-10 Conference

Ranking
- Coaches: No. 6
- AP: No. 8
- Record: 24–6 (15–3 Pac-10)
- Head coach: George Raveling (6th season)
- Home arena: L. A. Sports Arena

1991–92 Pacific-10 Conference men's basketball standings
	Conf.				Overall
Team	W		L	PCT	W		L	PCT
No. 4 UCLA	16	–	2	.889	28	–	5	.848
No. 8 USC	15	–	3	.833	24	–	6	.800
No. 10 Arizona	13	–	5	.722	24	–	7	.774
Stanford	10	–	8	.556	18	–	11	.621
Washington State	9	–	9	.500	22	–	11	.667
Arizona State	9	–	9	.500	19	–	14	.576
Oregon State	7	–	11	.389	15	–	16	.484
Washington	5	–	13	.278	12	–	17	.414
California	4	–	14	.222	10	–	18	.357
Oregon	2	–	16	.111	6	–	21	.222
As of April 15, 1991; Rankings from AP Poll

The 1991–92 USC Trojans men's basketball team represented the University of Southern California during the 1991–92 NCAA Division I men's basketball season. Led by head coach George Raveling, they played their home games at the L. A. Sports Arena in Los Angeles, California as members of the Pac-10 Conference.

== Roster ==
1991–92 USC Trojans men's basketball team
Players
Coaches

Pos.	#	Name	Height	Weight	Year	Previous school	Hometown
G	12	Duane Cooper	6 ft 1 in (1.85 m)	185 lb (84 kg)	Sr	Lakewood	Benton Harbor, MI
F	21	Lorenzo Orr	6 ft 8 in (2.03 m)	230 lb (104 kg)	Fr	Southeastern	Detroit, MI
G	23	Harold Miner	6 ft 5 in (1.96 m)	205 lb (93 kg)	Jr	Inglewood	Inglewood, CA

Head coach

- George Raveling (Villanova)

Assistant coach(es)

Legend

- (C) Team captain
- (S) Suspended
- (I) Ineligible
- (W) Walk-on
- Injured
- Current redshirt

== Schedule and results ==
Date time, TV	Rank^{#}	Opponent^{#}	Result	Record	Site (attendance) city, state
Non-conference regular season
Nov 22, 1991*		at UT Martin	W 102–81	1–0	L.A. Sports Arena; Los Angeles, CA
Nov 25, 1991*		at Nebraska	L 84–93	1–1	Bob Devaney Sports Center; Lincoln, NE
Nov 30, 1991*		Sacramento State	W 107–94	2–1	L.A. Sports Arena; Los Angeles, CA
Dec 2, 1991*		Saint Louis	W 76–60	3–1	L.A. Sports Arena; Los Angeles, CA
Dec 4, 1991*		at Gonzaga	W 77–60	4–1	The Kennel; Spokane, Washington
Dec 6, 1991*		vs. Kent State; Disneyland Freedom Bowl Classic	W 74–62	5–1	Bren Events Center; Irvine, California
Dec 7, 1991*		at UC Irvine; Disneyland Freedom Bowl Classic	W 80–71	6–1	Bren Events Center (3,316); Irvine, California
Dec 21, 1991*		No. 4 Ohio State	W 79–77 ^{OT}	7–1	L.A. Sports Arena; Los Angeles, CA
Dec 28, 1991*		Robert Morris	W 92–77	8–1	L.A. Sports Arena; Los Angeles, CA
Jan 6, 1992*	No. 23	Notre Dame	L 58–64	8–2	L.A. Sports Arena; Los Angeles, CA
Pac-10 regular season
Jan 9, 1992	No. 23	at No. 6 Arizona	L 68–107	8–3 (0–1)	McKale Center; Tucson, Arizona
Jan 12, 1992	No. 23	at Arizona State	W 69–64	9–3 (1–1)	ASU Activity Center; Tempe, Arizona
Jan 16, 1992		Oregon State	W 90–73	10–3 (2–1)	L.A. Sports Arena; Los Angeles, CA
Jan 18, 1992		Oregon	W 85–56	11–3 (3–1)	L.A. Sports Arena; Los Angeles, CA
Jan 23, 1992*		at No. 24 Stanford	W 82–72	12–3 (4–1)	Maples Pavilion; Stanford, California
Jan 25, 1992*		at California	W 85–83	13–3 (5–1)	Harmon Gym; Berkeley, California
Jan 29, 1992	No. 25	at No. 2 UCLA	W 86–82	14–3 (6–1)	Pauley Pavilion; Los Angeles, CA
Feb 6, 1992	No. 16	Washington State	W 75–62	15–3 (7–1)	L.A. Sports Arena; Los Angeles, CA
Feb 9, 1992	No. 16	Washington	W 59–56	16–3 (8–1)	L.A. Sports Arena; Los Angeles, CA
Feb 13, 1992	No. 13	at Oregon	W 69–68	17–3 (9–1)	McArthur Court; Eugene, Oregon
Feb 15, 1992	No. 13	at Oregon State	L 78–92	17–4 (9–2)	Gill Coliseum; Corvallis, Oregon
Feb 20, 1992	No. 15	California	W 94–81	18–4 (10–2)	L.A. Sports Arena; Los Angeles, CA
Feb 22, 1992	No. 15	Stanford	W 73–72	19–4 (11–2)	L.A. Sports Arena; Los Angeles, CA
Feb 27, 1992	No. 13	No. 4 UCLA	W 83–79	20–4 (12–2)	L.A. Sports Arena; Los Angeles, CA
Mar 5, 1992	No. 8	at Washington	W 75–63	21–4 (13–2)	Bank of America Arena; Seattle, WA
Mar 8, 1992	No. 8	at Washington State	L 68–82	21–5 (13–3)	Friel Court; Pullman, WA
Mar 12, 1992	No. 10	Arizona State	W 81–66	22–5 (14–3)	L.A. Sports Arena; Los Angeles, CA
Mar 14, 1992	No. 10	No. 2 Arizona	W 70–69	23–5 (15–3)	L.A. Sports Arena; Los Angeles, CA
NCAA Tournament
Mar 19, 1992*	(2 MW) No. 8	vs. (15 MW) Northeast Louisiana	W 84–54	24–5	Bradley Center; Milwaukee, WI
Mar 21, 1992*	(2 MW) No. 8	vs. (7 MW) Georgia Tech	L 78–79	24–6	Bradley Center (18,392); Milwaukee, WI
*Non-conference game. ^{#}Rankings from AP Poll. (#) Tournament seedings in parentheses. All times are in Pacific Time.

== Awards and honors ==
- Harold Miner – Pac-10 Player of the Year, Consensus First-team All-American
- George Raveling – Pac-10 Coach of the Year, Kodak National Coach of the Year

== Team Players in the 1992 NBA draft ==
Round	Pick	Player	NBA club
1	12	Harold Miner	Miami Heat
2	36	Duane Cooper	Los Angeles Lakers
