= 1991–92 Stanford Cardinal men's basketball team =

American college basketball season

1991–92 Stanford Cardinal men's basketball

1992 NCAA Division I men's basketball tournament, first round
- Conference: Pacific-10 Conference
- Record: 18–11 (10–8 Pac-10)
- Head coach: Mike Montgomery (6th season)
- Assistant coaches: Doug Oliver; Willis Wilson
- Home arena: Maples Pavilion (Capacity: 7,392)

1991–92 Pacific-10 Conference men's basketball standings
	Conf.				Overall
Team	W		L	PCT	W		L	PCT
No. 4 UCLA	16	–	2	.889	28	–	5	.848
No. 8 USC	15	–	3	.833	24	–	6	.800
No. 10 Arizona	13	–	5	.722	24	–	7	.774
Stanford	10	–	8	.556	18	–	11	.621
Washington State	9	–	9	.500	22	–	11	.667
Arizona State	9	–	9	.500	19	–	14	.576
Oregon State	7	–	11	.389	15	–	16	.484
Washington	5	–	13	.278	12	–	17	.414
California	4	–	14	.222	10	–	18	.357
Oregon	2	–	16	.111	6	–	21	.222
As of April 15, 1991; Rankings from AP Poll

The 1991–92 Stanford Cardinal men's basketball team represented Stanford University as a member of the Pacific-10 Conference during the 1991–92 NCAA Division I men's basketball season. Led by head coach Mike Montgomery, the Cardinal played their home games at Maples Pavilion.

== Roster ==
1991–92 Stanford Cardinal men's basketball team
Players
Coaches

Pos.	#	Name	Height	Weight	Year	Previous school	Hometown
G	11	Warren Gravely	6 ft 3 in (1.91 m)	—	Fr		Dallas, TX
G	14	Mike Morris	6 ft 5 in (1.96 m)	—	RS Sr		Santa Ana, CA
G	20	Marcus Lollie	6 ft 0 in (1.83 m)	—	Jr		Seattle, WA
G	21	Kenny Hicks	6 ft 4 in (1.93 m)	—	Jr		Sherman Oaks, CA
G	22	Peter Dukes	6 ft 5 in (1.96 m)	—	Jr		Seattle, WA
G	23	Bobby Patton	6 ft 0 in (1.83 m)	—			Youngstown, OH
G	25	David Harbour	6 ft 3 in (1.91 m)	—	Fr		Camarillo, CA
F	31	Adam Keefe	6 ft 9 in (2.06 m)	220 lb (100 kg)	Sr	Woodbridge High School	Irvine, California
F	32	Andy Poppink (redshirt)	6 ft 4 in (1.93 m)	—	Fr		Tecumseh, MI
F	33	Brent Williams	6 ft 6 in (1.98 m)	—	So		Tacoma, WA
F	35	Nick Ravn	6 ft 7 in (2.01 m)	—			Spencer, IA
C	40	Paul Garrett	6 ft 9 in (2.06 m)	—	Jr		Pacific Palisades, CA
F	43	Jason Weaver	6 ft 7 in (2.01 m)	—			Pueblo, CO
F	44	Todd Manley	6 ft 9 in (2.06 m)	—	Fr		Boring, OR
C	45	Bart Lammersen	6 ft 9 in (2.06 m)	—			Vienna, VA
C	55	Jim Morgan	6 ft 11 in (2.11 m)	—	Fr		Marietta, GA

Head coach

- Mike Montgomery (Long Beach State)

Assistant coach(es)

- Doug Oliver (San José State)
- Willis Wilson (Rice)

Legend

- (C) Team captain
- (S) Suspended
- (I) Ineligible
- (W) Walk-on
- Injured
- Current redshirt

Roster

== Schedule and results ==
Date time, TV	Rank^{#}	Opponent^{#}	Result	Record	Site (attendance) city, state
Regular season
November 22, 1991*		Loyola (MD); Apple Invitational	W 98–56	1–0	Maples Pavilion; Stanford, CA
November 23, 1991*		Rice; Apple Invitational	W 68–64	2–0	Maples Pavilion; Stanford, CA
November 30, 1991*; PSN SportsChannel		Colorado	W 71–58	3–0	Maples Pavilion; Stanford, CA
December 14, 1991*; PSN SportsChannel		at Santa Clara	W 75–59	4–0	Leavey Center; Santa Clara, CA
December 21, 1991*; ESPN		Virginia	W 74–60	5–0	Maples Pavilion; Stanford, CA
December 27, 1991*		vs. Siena; Oldsmobile Spartan Classic	W 94–72	6–0	Breslin Center; East Lansing, Michigan
December 28, 1991*		at No. 9 Michigan State; Oldsmobile Spartan Classic	L 62–72	6–1	Breslin Center; East Lansing, Michigan
January 2, 1992*		Southern Utah	W 89–71	7–1	Maples Pavilion; Stanford, CA
January 4, 1992*		Cal State Northridge	W 80–59	8–1	Maples Pavilion; Stanford, CA
January 9, 1992; PSN SportsChannel		at Oregon State	W 67–64	9–1 (1–0)	Gill Coliseum; Corvallis, OR
January 11, 1992; PSN Prime		at Oregon	W 78–57	10–1 (2–0)	McArthur Court; Eugene, OR
January 18, 1992		California	W 76–61	11–1 (3–0)	Maples Pavilion; Stanford, CA
January 23, 1992; PSN Prime	No. 24	USC	L 72–82	11–2 (3–1)	Maples Pavilion; Stanford, CA
January 25, 1992; PSN Raycom	No. 24	No. 2 UCLA	L 77–83	11–3 (3–2)	Maples Pavilion; Stanford, CA
January 30, 1992; PSN Prime		at Washington State	L 59–67	11–4 (3–3)	Beasley Coliseum; Pullman, WA
February 2, 1992		at Washington	W 64–58	12–4 (4–3)	Hec Edmundson Pavilion; Seattle, WA
February 6, 1992		No. 7 Arizona	L 70–72	12–5 (4–4)	Maples Pavilion; Stanford, CA
February 8, 1992		Arizona State	W 86–73	13–5 (5–4)	Maples Pavilion; Stanford, CA
February 11, 1992*; PSN SportsChannel		at Notre Dame	L 63–64	13–6	Joyce Center; South Bend, IN
February 15, 1992; ESPN		at California	W 92–66	14–6 (6–4)	Harmon Gym; Berkeley, CA
February 20, 1992; PSN SportsChannel		at No. 2 UCLA	L 70–96	14–7 (6–5)	Pauley Pavilion; Los Angeles, CA
February 22, 1992		at No. 15 USC	L 72–73	14–8 (6–6)	L.A. Sports Arena; Los Angeles, CA
February 27, 1992		Washington	W 78–66	15–8 (7–6)	Maples Pavilion; Stanford, CA
March 1, 1992		Washington State	W 85–70	16–8 (8–6)	Maples Pavilion; Stanford, CA
March 5, 1992		at Arizona State	L 71–76	16–9 (8–7)	Desert Financial Arena; Tempe, AZ
March 7, 1992		at No. 4 Arizona	L 83–89	16–10 (8–8)	McKale Center; Tucson, AZ
March 12, 1992		Oregon	L 47–70	17–10 (9–8)	Maples Pavilion; Stanford, CA
March 14, 1992; PSN SportsChannel		Oregon State	W 76–56	18–10 (10–8)	Maples Pavilion; Stanford, CA
NCAA Tournament
March 19, 1992*; CBS	(12 SE)	vs. (5 SE) No. 13 Alabama; First Round	L 75–80	18–11	Riverfront Coliseum; Cincinnati, Ohio
*Non-conference game. ^{#}Rankings from AP Poll. (#) Tournament seedings in parentheses. SE=Southeast.

== NBA draft ==
Round	Pick	Player	NBA club
1	10	Adam Keefe	Atlanta Hawks
