= 1995–96 UCLA Bruins men's basketball team =

American college basketball season

1995–96 UCLA Bruins men's basketball

Pac-10 regular season champions

NCAA tournament, Round of 64
- Conference: Pacific-10

Ranking
- Coaches: No. 19
- AP: No. 14
- Record: 23–8 (16–2 Pac-10)
- Head coach: Jim Harrick (8th season)
- Assistant coaches: Lorenzo Romar; Steve Lavin; Greg White
- Home arena: Pauley Pavilion

1995–96 Pacific-10 Conference men's basketball standings
	Conf.				Overall
Team	W		L	PCT	W		L	PCT
No. 14 UCLA	16	–	2	.889	23	–	8	.742
No. 11 Arizona	14	–	4	.778	27	–	6	.818
Stanford	12	–	6	.667	21	–	8	.724
Washington State	9	–	9	.500	18	–	11	.621
Washington	9	–	9	.500	16	–	12	.571
Oregon	9	–	9	.500	16	–	13	.552
USC	6	–	12	.333	13	–	17	.433
Arizona State	6	–	12	.333	11	–	16	.407
Oregon State	4	–	14	.222	6	–	21	.222
California^{1}	2	–	16	.111	2	–	26	.071
As of November 23, 2011; Rankings from AP Poll^{1}California forfeited games due to infractions.

The 1995–96 UCLA Bruins men's basketball team represented the University of California, Los Angeles in the 1995–96 NCAA Division I men's basketball season as Defending National Champions from 1995, but bookended the season with two disappointing losses. While ranked #4, one loss was in the Maui Classic to a Santa Clara team led by then obscure guard Steve Nash. The team finished 1st in the conference. The Bruins competed in the 1996 NCAA Division I men's basketball tournament, flopping in a spectacular upset to the unranked Princeton Tigers in the round of 64. This was the final season for head coach Jim Harrick, a national championship coach who was fired over a transgression where he lied about two current players attending a recruiting dinner at Monty's Steakhouse, in contravention of NCAA rules.

== Roster ==
1995–96 UCLA Bruins men's basketball team
Players
Coaches

Pos.	#	Name	Height	Weight	Year	Hometown
G	12	Toby Bailey	6 ft 5 in (1.96 m)	185 lb (84 kg)	So	Los Angeles, California
F	30	Kevin Dempsey	6 ft 6 in (1.98 m)	210 lb (95 kg)	Sr	San Jose, California
G	5	Cameron Dollar (C)	6 ft 1 in (1.85 m)	173 lb (78 kg)	Jr	Atlanta, Georgia
C	50	Omm'A Givens	6 ft 10 in (2.08 m)	235 lb (107 kg)	So	Frances, Washington
F	52	J. R. Henderson	6 ft 9 in (2.06 m)	215 lb (98 kg)	So	Bakersfield, California
G	54	Kris Johnson	6 ft 5 in (1.96 m)	220 lb (100 kg)	So	Los Angeles, California
G	20	Brandon Loyd	6 ft 1 in (1.85 m)	175 lb (79 kg)	Fr	Tulsa, Oklahoma
C	34	Jelani McCoy	6 ft 10 in (2.08 m)	225 lb (102 kg)	Fr	Oakland, California
F	24	Bob Myers	6 ft 6 in (1.98 m)	210 lb (95 kg)	Jr	Danville, California
C	35	Ike Nwankwo	6 ft 11 in (2.11 m)	234 lb (106 kg)	Jr	Houston, Texas
F	13	Charles O'Bannon (C)	6 ft 6 in (1.98 m)	205 lb (93 kg)	Jr	Bellflower, California
G		Harold Sylvester	5 ft 10 in (1.78 m)	—	So

Head coach

Jim Harrick (Morris Harvey College)

Assistant coach(es)

- Steve Lavin (Chapman)
- Lorenzo Romar (Washington)
- Greg White (Marshall)

Legend

- (C) Team captain
- (S) Suspended
- (I) Ineligible
- (W) Walk-on
- Injured
- Current redshirt

Roster
Last update: 30 January 2018

== Schedule ==
Date time, TV	Rank^{#}	Opponent^{#}	Result	Record	Site city, state
November 20, 1995	No. 4	vs. Santa Clara; Maui Invitational Quarterfinals	L 69–78	0–1	Lahaina Civic Center (2,400); Maui, HI
November 21, 1995	No. 4	vs. Wisconsin; Maui Invitational Consolation Second Round	W 68–57	1–1	Lahaina Civic Center (2,400); Maui, HI
November 22, 1995	No. 4	vs. Vanderbilt; Maui Invitational Fifth Place Game	L 71–75	1–2	Lahaina Civic Center (2,400); Maui, HI
November 28, 1995	No. 23	Cal State Fullerton	W 79–63	2–2	Pauley Pavilion (10,941); Los Angeles, CA
December 2, 1995	No. 23	at No. 2 Kansas	L 70–85	2–3	Allen Fieldhouse (16,300); Lawrence, KS
December 9, 1995		vs. No. 20 Maryland; John R. Wooden Classic	W 73–63	3–3	Arrowhead Pond of Anaheim (17,330); Anaheim, CA
December 18, 1995		Stephen F. Austin	W 109–88	4–3	Pauley Pavilion (9,421); Los Angeles, CA
December 20, 1995		at Notre Dame	W 83–58	5–3	Edmund P. Joyce Center (9,339); Notre Dame, IN
December 23, 1995		at UNLV	W 89–82	6–3	Thomas & Mack Center (9,935); Paradise, NV
December 30, 1995	No. 23	San Francisco	W 93–58	7–3	Pauley Pavilion (11,495); Los Angeles, CA
January 4, 1996	No. 20	at Washington State	W 78–73 ^{OT}	8–3 (1–0)	Spokane Arena (11,897); Spokane, WA
January 6, 1996	No. 20	at Washington	W 78–70	9–3 (2–0)	Hec Edmundson Pavilion (7,900); Seattle, WA
January 11, 1996	No. 17	No. 24 Stanford	W 64–56	10–3 (3–0)	Pauley Pavilion (12,695); Los Angeles, CA
January 13, 1996	No. 17	California	W 93–73	11–3 (4–0)	Pauley Pavilion (12,881); Los Angeles, CA
January 18, 1996	No. 13	at Arizona State	W 87–73	12–3 (5–0)	ASU Activity Center (11,081); Tempe, AZ
January 20, 1996	No. 13	at No. 18 Arizona	L 79–88	12–4 (5–1)	McKale Center (14,638); Tucson, AZ
January 24, 1996	No. 15	USC	W 99–72	13–4 (6–1)	Pauley Pavilion (12,635); Los Angeles, CA
January 27, 1996	No. 15	Louisville	L 76–78	13–5	Pauley Pavilion (11,978); Los Angeles, CA
February 1, 1996	No. 19	Oregon	W 85–78	14–5 (7–1)	Pauley Pavilion (12,073); Los Angeles, CA
February 3, 1996	No. 19	Oregon State	W 69–60	15–5 (8–1)	Pauley Pavilion (11,280); Los Angeles, CA
February 8, 1996	No. 17	at California	W 73–65	16–5 (9–1)	Oakland Arena (15,039); Oakland, CA
February 10, 1996	No. 17	at No. 25 Stanford	L 66–67	16–6 (9–2)	Maples Pavilion (7,391); Stanford, CA
February 15, 1996	No. 18	No. 13 Arizona	W 76–75	17–6 (10–2)	Pauley Pavilion (13,014); Los Angeles, CA
February 17, 1996	No. 18	Arizona State	W 87–70	18–6 (11–2)	Pauley Pavilion (12,062); Los Angeles, CA
February 22, 1996	No. 16	at USC	W 61–59	19–6 (12–2)	Los Angeles Memorial Sports Arena (9,433); Los Angeles, CA
February 25, 1996	No. 16	at Duke	L 66–85	19–7	Cameron Indoor Stadium (9,314); Durham, NC
February 29, 1996	No. 17	at Oregon State	W 68–66	20–7 (13–2)	Gill Coliseum (5,873); Corvallis, OR
March 02, 1996	No. 17	at Oregon	W 77–71	21–7 (14–2)	McArthur Court (9,738); Eugene, OR
March 07, 1996	No. 17	Washington	W 91–88 ^{OT}	22–7 (15–2)	Pauley Pavilion (11,890); Los Angeles, CA
March 09, 1996	No. 17	Washington State	W 82–71	23–7 (16–2)	Pauley Pavilion (11,966); Los Angeles, CA
NCAA tournament
March 14, 1996	No. 14	vs. Princeton; First Round	L 41–43	23–8	Hoosier Dome (31,569); Indianapolis, IN
*Non-conference game. ^{#}Rankings from AP Poll. (#) Tournament seedings in parentheses. All times are in Pacific Time.
