= 1995–96 Washington Huskies men's basketball team =

American college basketball season

1995–96 Washington Huskies men's basketball

NIT, First round
- Conference: Pacific-10 Conference
- Record: 16–12 (9–9 Pac-10)
- Head coach: Bob Bender (3rd season)
- Assistant coach: Ray Giacoletti
- Home arena: Hec Edmundson Pavilion

1995–96 Pacific-10 Conference men's basketball standings
	Conf.				Overall
Team	W		L	PCT	W		L	PCT
No. 14 UCLA	16	–	2	.889	23	–	8	.742
No. 11 Arizona	14	–	4	.778	27	–	6	.818
Stanford	12	–	6	.667	21	–	8	.724
Washington State	9	–	9	.500	18	–	11	.621
Washington	9	–	9	.500	16	–	12	.571
Oregon	9	–	9	.500	16	–	13	.552
USC	6	–	12	.333	13	–	17	.433
Arizona State	6	–	12	.333	11	–	16	.407
Oregon State	4	–	14	.222	6	–	21	.222
California^{1}	2	–	16	.111	2	–	26	.071
As of November 23, 2011; Rankings from AP Poll^{1}California forfeited games due to infractions.

The 1995–96 Washington Huskies men's basketball team represented the University of Washington for the 1995–96 NCAA Division I men's basketball season. Led by third-year head coach Bob Bender, the Huskies were members of the Pacific-10 Conference and played their home games on campus at Hec Edmundson Pavilion in Seattle, Washington.

The Huskies were 16–11 overall in the regular season and 9–9 in conference play, tied for fifth (later fourth) in the standings. There was no conference tournament this season; last played in 1990, it resumed in 2002.

Washington played in the National Invitation Tournament for the first time in nine years and lost by fourteen points at Michigan State.

== Postseason result ==
Date time, TV	Opponent	Result	Record	Site (attendance) city, state
National Invitation Tournament
Wed, March 13*; 4:30 pm	at Michigan State; First round	L 50–64	16–12	Breslin Center (6,611); Lansing, Michigan
*Non-conference game. ^{#}Rankings from AP poll. (#) Tournament seedings in parentheses. All times are in Pacific time.
