= 1995–96 Washington State Cougars men's basketball team =

American college basketball season

1995–96 Washington State Cougars men's basketball

National Invitation Tournament, Second round
- Conference: Pacific-10 Conference
- Record: 18–11 (9–9 Pac-10)
- Head coach: Kevin Eastman (2nd season)
- Home arena: Beasley Coliseum

1995–96 Pacific-10 Conference men's basketball standings
	Conf.				Overall
Team	W		L	PCT	W		L	PCT
No. 14 UCLA	16	–	2	.889	23	–	8	.742
No. 11 Arizona	14	–	4	.778	27	–	6	.818
Stanford	12	–	6	.667	21	–	8	.724
Washington State	9	–	9	.500	18	–	11	.621
Washington	9	–	9	.500	16	–	12	.571
Oregon	9	–	9	.500	16	–	13	.552
USC	6	–	12	.333	13	–	17	.433
Arizona State	6	–	12	.333	11	–	16	.407
Oregon State	4	–	14	.222	6	–	21	.222
California^{1}	2	–	16	.111	2	–	26	.071
As of November 23, 2011; Rankings from AP Poll^{1}California forfeited games due to infractions.

The 1995–96 Washington State Cougars men's basketball team represented Washington State University for the 1995–96 NCAA Division I men's basketball season. Led by second-year head coach Kevin Eastman, the Cougars were members of the Pacific-10 Conference and played their home games on campus at Beasley Coliseum in Pullman, Washington.

The Cougars were 17–10 overall in the regular season and 9–9 in conference play (after a forfeit by California), tied for fourth in the standings. There was no conference tournament this season; last played in 1990, it resumed in 2002.

For the second consecutive year, Washington State played in the National Invitation Tournament, and advanced to the second round.

== Postseason results ==
Date time, TV	Opponent	Result	Record	Site (attendance) city, state
National Invitation Tournament
Thu, March 14*; 7:00 pm	Gonzaga; First round	W 92–73	18–10	Beasley Coliseum (6,985); Pullman, Washington
Tue, March 19*; 5:00 pm	at Nebraska; Second round	L 73–82	18–11	Devaney Center (9,037); Lincoln, Nebraska
*Non-conference game. ^{#}Rankings from AP poll. (#) Tournament seedings in parentheses. All times are in Pacific time.
