= 1991–92 Washington State Cougars men's basketball team =

American college basketball season

1991–92 Washington State Cougars men's basketball

National Invitation Tournament, Second round
- Conference: Pacific-10
- Record: 22–11 (9–9 Pac-10)
- Head coach: Kelvin Sampson (5th season)
- Home arena: Beasley Coliseum

1991–92 Pacific-10 Conference men's basketball standings
	Conf.				Overall
Team	W		L	PCT	W		L	PCT
No. 4 UCLA	16	–	2	.889	28	–	5	.848
No. 8 USC	15	–	3	.833	24	–	6	.800
No. 10 Arizona	13	–	5	.722	24	–	7	.774
Stanford	10	–	8	.556	18	–	11	.621
Washington State	9	–	9	.500	22	–	11	.667
Arizona State	9	–	9	.500	19	–	14	.576
Oregon State	7	–	11	.389	15	–	16	.484
Washington	5	–	13	.278	12	–	17	.414
California	4	–	14	.222	10	–	18	.357
Oregon	2	–	16	.111	6	–	21	.222
As of April 15, 1991; Rankings from AP Poll

The 1991–92 Washington State Cougars men's basketball team represented Washington State University for the 1991–92 NCAA Division I men's basketball season. Led by fifth-year head coach Kelvin Sampson, the Cougars were members of the Pacific-10 Conference and played their home games on campus at Beasley Coliseum in Pullman, Washington.

The Cougars were 21–10 overall in the regular season and 9–9 in conference play, tied for fifth in the standings. There was no conference tournament this season; last played in 1990, it resumed in 2002.

For the first time, Washington State played in the National Invitation Tournament, and advanced to the second round.

== Postseason results ==
Date time, TV	Opponent	Result	Record	Site (attendance) city, state
National Invitation Tournament
Wed, March 18*; 9:00 pm, ESPN	Minnesota; First round	W 72–70	22–10	Beasley Coliseum (4,003); Pullman, Washington
Mon, March 23*; 6:30 pm	at New Mexico; Second round	L 71–79	22–11	The Pit (11,184); Albuquerque, New Mexico
*Non-conference game. ^{#}Rankings from AP poll. (#) Tournament seedings in parentheses. All times are in Pacific time.
