= 1995–96 California Golden Bears men's basketball team =

American college basketball season

1995–96 California Golden Bears men's basketball

NCAA tournament (vacated)
- Conference: Pacific-10 Conference
- Record: 2–26 (17–11 unadjusted) (2–16 (11–7 unadjusted) Pac-10)
- Head coach: Todd Bozeman
- Assistant coach: Billy Kennedy (3rd season)
- Home arena: Harmon Gym

1995–96 Pacific-10 Conference men's basketball standings
	Conf.				Overall
Team	W		L	PCT	W		L	PCT
No. 14 UCLA	16	–	2	.889	23	–	8	.742
No. 11 Arizona	14	–	4	.778	27	–	6	.818
Stanford	12	–	6	.667	21	–	8	.724
Washington State	9	–	9	.500	18	–	11	.621
Washington	9	–	9	.500	16	–	12	.571
Oregon	9	–	9	.500	16	–	13	.552
USC	6	–	12	.333	13	–	17	.433
Arizona State	6	–	12	.333	11	–	16	.407
Oregon State	4	–	14	.222	6	–	21	.222
California^{1}	2	–	16	.111	2	–	26	.071
As of November 23, 2011; Rankings from AP Poll^{1}California forfeited games due to infractions.

The 1995–96 California Golden Bears men's basketball team represented the University of California, Berkeley as a member of the Pacific-10 Conference during the 1995–96 season.

Led by head coach Todd Bozeman, the Bears finished the regular season with a 11–7 record in the Pac-10, placing them fourth behind UCLA, Arizona, and Stanford. The Bears received an at-large bid to the NCAA tournament, where they were eliminated by Iowa State in the opening round.

The Golden Bears finished the season with an overall record of 17–11, but that record was adjusted to 2–26 due to NCAA infractions. Following the season, in late summer, head coach Todd Bozeman resigned his position.

== Roster ==
1995–96 California Golden Bears men's basketball team
Players
Coaches

Pos.	#	Name	Height	Weight	Year	Hometown
F	3	Shareef Abdur-Rahim	6 ft 9 in (2.06 m)	220 lb (100 kg)	Fr	Marietta, GA
F	4	Alfred Grigsby	6 ft 9 in (2.06 m)	—	Jr
G	13	Jelani Gardner	6 ft 6 in (1.98 m)	200 lb (91 kg)	So	Pasadena, CA
G	22	Ed Gray	6 ft 3 in (1.91 m)	210 lb (95 kg)	Jr	Riverside, CA
G	23	Randy Duck	6 ft 0 in (1.83 m)	—	Jr
F	24	Tremaine Fowlkes	6 ft 8 in (2.03 m)	215 lb (98 kg)	So	Los Angeles, CA
F	34	Tony Gonzalez	6 ft 5 in (1.96 m)	235 lb (107 kg)	So	Huntington Beach, CA
F/C	40	Sean Marks	6 ft 10 in (2.08 m)	245 lb (111 kg)	So	Auckland, New Zealand
F	44	Michael Stewart	6 ft 10 in (2.08 m)	220 lb (100 kg)	Jr	Sacramento, CA

Head coach

- Ben Braun

Assistant coach(es)

- Billy Kennedy (Southeastern Louisiana)

Legend

- (C) Team captain
- (S) Suspended
- (I) Ineligible
- (W) Walk-on
- Injured
- Current redshirt

== Schedule and results ==
Date time, TV	Rank^{#}	Opponent^{#}	Result	Record	Site city, state
Non-conference regular season
Dec 16, 1995*		at Minnesota	W 70–67	4–0	Williams Arena; Minneapolis, Minnesota
Dec 20, 1995*	No. 24	No. 9 Cincinnati	L 70–77	4–1	Harmon Gym; Berkeley, California
Dec 23, 1995*	No. 24	vs. No. 14 Illinois	L 69–83	4–2	United Center; Chicago, Illinois
Dec 28, 1995*		Holy Cross	W 75–64	5–2	Harmon Gym; Berkeley, California
Dec 29, 1995*		Kansas State	L 58–65	5–3	Harmon Gym; Berkeley, California
Pac-10 regular season
Jan 4, 1996		No. 9 Arizona	W 99–75	6–3 (1–0)	Harmon Gym; Berkeley, California
Jan 6, 1996		Arizona State	W 97–82	7–3 (2–0)	Harmon Gym; Berkeley, California
Jan 11, 1996		at USC	W 63–60	8–3 (3–0)	L.A. Sports Arena; Los Angeles, California
Jan 13, 1996		at No. 17 UCLA	L 73–93	8–4 (3–1)	Pauley Pavilion; Los Angeles, California
Jan 18, 1996		Oregon State	W 70–52	9–4 (4–1)	Harmon Gym; Berkeley, California
Jan 20, 1996		Oregon	W 97–72	10–4 (5–1)	Harmon Gym; Berkeley, California
Jan 25, 1996	No. 25	at Washington State	W 87–79	11–4 (6–1)	Beasley Coliseum; Pullman, Washington
Jan 27, 1996	No. 25	at Washington	L 69–71	11–5 (6–2)	Hec Edmundson Pavilion; Seattle, Washington
Jan 31, 1996	No. 25	at Stanford	L 79–93	11–6 (6–3)	Maples Pavilion; Stanford, California
Feb 4, 1996*		vs. DePaul	W 62–59	12–6	
Feb 8, 1996		No. 17 UCLA	L 65–73	12–7 (6–4)	Harmon Gym; Berkeley, California
Feb 10, 1996		USC	W 85–69	13–7 (7–4)	Harmon Gym; Berkeley, California
Mar 9, 1996		at No. 11 Arizona	L 68–71	17–10 (11–7)	McKale Center; Tucson, Arizona
NCAA Tournament
Mar 14, 1996*; CBS	(12 MW)	vs. (5 MW) No. 17 Iowa State; First round	L 64–74	17–11	Reunion Arena; Dallas, Texas
*Non-conference game. ^{#}Rankings from AP Poll. (#) Tournament seedings in parentheses. MW=Midwest. All times are in Pacific.

== Team players drafted into the NBA ==
Round	Pick	Player	NBA team
1	3	Shareef Abdur-Rahim	Vancouver Grizzlies
