= 1991–92 Arizona Wildcats men's basketball team =

American college basketball season

1991–92 Arizona Wildcats men's basketball

NCAA tournament, first round
- Conference: Pacific-10 Conference

Ranking
- Coaches: No. 7
- AP: No. 10
- Record: 24–7 (13–5 Pac-10)
- Head coach: Lute Olson (9th season)
- Assistant coaches: Jim Rosborough (3rd season); Jessie Evans (4th season)
- Home arena: McKale Center

1991–92 Pacific-10 Conference men's basketball standings
	Conf.				Overall
Team	W		L	PCT	W		L	PCT
No. 4 UCLA	16	–	2	.889	28	–	5	.848
No. 8 USC	15	–	3	.833	24	–	6	.800
No. 10 Arizona	13	–	5	.722	24	–	7	.774
Stanford	10	–	8	.556	18	–	11	.621
Washington State	9	–	9	.500	22	–	11	.667
Arizona State	9	–	9	.500	19	–	14	.576
Oregon State	7	–	11	.389	15	–	16	.484
Washington	5	–	13	.278	12	–	17	.414
California	4	–	14	.222	10	–	18	.357
Oregon	2	–	16	.111	6	–	21	.222
As of April 15, 1991; Rankings from AP Poll

The 1991–92 Arizona Wildcats men's basketball team represented the University of Arizona as members of the Pacific-10 Conference during the 1991–92 season. The team's head coach was Lute Olson. The team played its home games in McKale Center.

After going 13–5 to finish third in the Pac-10 during the regular-season, the team was seeded third in the Southeast region of the NCAA tournament. The Wildcats were upset in the first round by East Tennessee State, 87–80, and finished with an overall record of 24–7.

== Roster ==
1991–92 Arizona Wildcats men's basketball team
Players
Coaches

Pos.	#	Name	Height	Weight	Year	Previous school	Hometown
G	3	Khalid Reeves	6 ft 3 in (1.91 m)	195 lb (88 kg)	So		Queens, New York
PG	12	Matt Othick	6 ft 2 in (1.88 m)	165 lb (75 kg)	Sr	Bishop Gorman HS	Clovis, NM
G	20	Damon Stoudamire	5 ft 10 in (1.78 m)	165 lb (75 kg)	Fr		Portland, Oregon
G	21	Brian Nelson	6 ft 4 in (1.93 m)	180 lb (82 kg)	Fr	LyonsTownship HS	Western Springs, IL
F	22	Ray Owes	6 ft 9 in (2.06 m)	215 lb (98 kg)	Fr		San Bernardino, California
G/F	23	Deron Johnson	6 ft 5 in (1.96 m)	173 lb (78 kg)	So	Sunyside HS	Tucson, AZ
G/F	24	Sean Allen	6 ft 8 in (2.03 m)	173 lb (78 kg)	Fr	Western HS	Las Vegas, NV
G	25	Dylan Rigdon	6 ft 3 in (1.91 m)	189 lb (86 kg)	Jr	University of California Irvine	Laguna Beach, CA
F	30	Wayne Womack	6 ft 8 in (2.03 m)	205 lb (93 kg)	Sr	John Muir HS	Pasadena, CA
C	41	Ed Stokes	7 ft 0 in (2.13 m)	255 lb (116 kg)	Jr		Los Angeles, California
F	42	Chris Mills	6 ft 9 in (2.06 m)	210 lb (95 kg)	Jr		Los Angeles, California
C	45	Sean Rooks	6 ft 10 in (2.08 m)	250 lb (113 kg)	Sr	Fontana HS	New York, NY
F	51	Kevin Flanagan	6 ft 10 in (2.08 m)	233 lb (106 kg)	So	Torrey Pines HS	Del Mar, CA

Head coach

- Lute Olson (Augsburg)

Assistant coach(es)

Legend

- (C) Team captain
- (S) Suspended
- (I) Ineligible
- (W) Walk-on
- Injured
- Current redshirt

== Schedule and results ==
Date time, TV	Rank^{#}	Opponent^{#}	Result	Record	Site city, state
Regular Season
Nov 29, 1991*	No. 3	vs. Dayton; Hawaii Tip-Off Tournament	W 84–68	1–0	Neal S. Blaisdell Center; Honolulu, Hawaii
Nov 30, 1991*	No. 3	at Hawaii; Hawaii Tip-Off Tournament	W 85–71	2–0	Neal S. Blaisdell Center; Honolulu, Hawaii
Dec 7, 1991*	No. 3	No. 16 LSU	W 87–67	3–0	McKale Center; Tucson, Arizona
Dec 15, 1991*	No. 2	at New Mexico	W 66–54	4–0	The Pit; Albuquerque, New Mexico
Dec 18, 1991*	No. 2	Northern Arizona	W 127–81	5–0	McKale Center; Tucson, Arizona
Dec 21, 1991*	No. 2	at No. 19 Arkansas	L 59–65	5–1	Barnhill Arena; Fayetteville, Arkansas
Dec 28, 1991*	No. 6	Evansville	W 83–76	6–1	McKale Center; Tucson, Arizona
Dec 29, 1991*	No. 6	Rutgers	W 103–80	7–1	McKale Center; Tucson, Arizona
Jan 2, 1992*	No. 6	New Orleans	W 82–64	8–1	McKale Center; Tucson, Arizona
Jan 5, 1992*	No. 6	Santa Clara	W 79–60	9–1	McKale Center; Tucson, Arizona
Jan 9, 1992	No. 6	No. 23 USC	W 107–68	10–1 (1–0)	McKale Center; Tucson, Arizona
Jan 11, 1992	No. 6	No. 2 UCLA	L 87–89	10–2 (1–1)	McKale Center; Tucson, Arizona
Jan 16, 1992	No. 7	at Washington	L 60–62	10–3 (1–2)	Bank of America Arena; Seattle, Washington
Jan 18, 1992	No. 7	at Washington State	W 78–65	11–3 (2–2)	Friel Court; Pullman, Washington
Jan 23, 1992	No. 11	Arizona State	W 92–55	12–3 (3–2)	McKale Center; Tucson, Arizona
Jan 25, 1992*	No. 11	Pittsburgh	W 96–76	13–3	McKale Center; Tucson, Arizona
Jan 30, 1992	No. 9	Oregon	W 104–53	14–3 (4–2)	McKale Center; Tucson, Arizona
Feb 2, 1992	No. 9	Oregon State	W 86–58	15–3 (5–2)	McKale Center; Tucson, Arizona
Feb 6, 1992	No. 7	at Stanford	W 72–70	16–3 (6–2)	Maples Pavilion; Stanford, California
Feb 9, 1992	No. 7	at California	W 80–68	17–3 (7–2)	Harmon Gym; Berkeley, California
Feb 13, 1992	No. 7	Washington State	W 94–72	18–3 (8–2)	McKale Center; Tucson, Arizona
Feb 15, 1992	No. 7	Washington	W 85–51	19–3 (9–2)	McKale Center; Tucson, Arizona
Feb 20, 1992	No. 5	at Arizona State	L 74–77	19–4 (9–3)	Wells Fargo Arena; Tempe, Arizona
Feb 23, 1992*	No. 5	vs. Temple; 7-Up Shootout	W 66–60	20–4	St. Petersburg, Florida
Feb 27, 1992	No. 5	at Oregon	W 104–56	21–4 (10–3)	McArthur Court; Eugene, Oregon
Mar 1, 1992	No. 5	at Oregon State	W 70–62	22–4 (11–3)	Gill Coliseum; Corvallis, Oregon
Mar 5, 1992	No. 4	California	W 100–77	23–4 (12–3)	McKale Center; Tucson, Arizona
Mar 7, 1992	No. 4	Stanford	W 89–83	24–4 (13–3)	McKale Center; Tucson, Arizona
Mar 12, 1992	No. 2	at No. 8 UCLA	L 81–89	24–5 (13–4)	Pauley Pavilion; Los Angeles, California
Mar 14, 1992	No. 2	at No. 10 USC	L 69–70	24–6 (13–5)	L.A. Sports Arena; Los Angeles, California
NCAA Tournament
Mar 20, 1992*	(3 SE) No. 10	vs. (14 SE) East Tennessee State; First Round	L 80–87	24–7	Omni Coliseum; Atlanta, Georgia
*Non-conference game. ^{#}Rankings from AP Poll. (#) Tournament seedings in parentheses. SE=Southeast.

== Team players drafted into the NBA ==
Round	Pick	Player	NBA club
2	35	Sean Rooks	Dallas Mavericks
