= Mike Montgomery (basketball) =

American basketball coach (born 1947)

- Montgomery in 2026

Biographical details
- Born: February 27, 1947 (age 79); Long Beach, California, U.S.
- Education: Long Beach State, B.A. Colorado State, M.Ed.

Coaching career (HC unless noted)
- 1969–1970: Coast Guard (assistant)
- 1970–1971: Colorado State (assistant)
- 1971–1972: The Citadel (assistant)
- 1972–1973: Florida (assistant)
- 1973–1976: Boise State (assistant)
- 1976–1978: Montana (assistant)
- 1978–1986: Montana
- 1986–2004: Stanford
- 2004–2006: Golden State Warriors
- 2008–2014: California

Head coaching record
- Overall: 677–317 (college); 68–96 (NBA)
- Tournaments: 18–16 (NCAA Division I); 9–7 (NIT)

Accomplishments and honors

Championships
- NCAA Regional—Final Four (1998); NIT (1991); Big Sky regular season (1986); 5 Pac-10 regular season (1999–2001, 2004, 2010); Pac-10 tournament (2004)

Awards
- Naismith College Coach of the Year (2000) co-NABC Coach of the Year (2004); 4× Pac-10 Coach of the Year (1999, 2000, 2003, 2004); John R. Wooden Award Legends of Coaching Award (2004)
- College Basketball Hall of Fame; Inducted in 2016

Michael John Montgomery (born February 27, 1947) is an American former basketball coach. He is best known for his 18-year tenure at Stanford (1986–2004), where he led the program to 12 NCAA Tournaments, including a Final Four appearance in 1998. Montgomery previously served as head coach at the Montana (1978–1986). Following his time at Stanford, he coached the Golden State Warriors of the National Basketball Association (NBA) for two seasons (2004–2006) before ending his career at the University of California (2008–2014). He announced his retirement from coaching following the 2013–14 season.

Over his 32-year collegiate coaching career, Montgomery made 16 NCAA Tournaments, captured 6 conference championships, and amassed nearly 700 victories. He also led Stanford to the NIT championship in 1991.

== Early years ==
Born and reared in Long Beach, California, Montgomery graduated from its Millikan High School and attended Long Beach State. He received a Bachelor of Arts degree in physical education from Long Beach State and later a Master's degree in physical education from Colorado State University in Fort Collins. Montgomery is an alumni member of Sigma Alpha Epsilon fraternity, which he joined while at Long Beach State.

== College coaching career ==
Montgomery compiled a 677–317 (.681) overall record in over 30 years at Berkeley (2008–2014), Stanford (1986–2004) and Montana (1978–1986). He boasts 31 winning seasons in his 32 years as a head coach at Berkeley, Stanford and Montana. Montgomery's Stanford teams reached the NCAA tournament ten straight times from 1995 to 2004. Stanford reached the Final Four under Montgomery in 1998, the school's first Final Four appearance in 56 years. He made his third appearance along the USA Basketball sidelines in 2002 when he was named an assistant under George Karl for the US national team in the 2002 FIBA World Championship.

Prior to being named head coach at Montana in 1978, he was an assistant for the Grizz in Missoula for two seasons under new head coach Jim Brandenburg, who succeeded hall of famer Jud Heathcote in 1976. Brandenburg left after two season for Wyoming in 1978 and Montgomery was promoted. At Montana, Montgomery coached future NBA players Micheal Ray Richardson and Larry Krystkowiak. Prior to Montana, Montgomery was an assistant for three years at Boise State under Bus Connor, and had previously been an assistant for a season each at four different schools.

In 2000, Montgomery was named the Naismith and Basketball Times Coach of the Year. He was also named the Pac-10 Coach of the Year four times. Following his career at Stanford, he was awarded the John R. Wooden Legends of Coaching Lifetime Achievement Award.

On August 30, 2007, Stanford University announced that Montgomery was returning to the university as Assistant to the Athletic Director on a part-time basis. According to the announcement, "his duties will include fund raising and public relations while also serving as a mentor to Stanford's coaching staff."

On April 4, 2008, Montgomery was named the head coach of the California men's basketball program. In his first season the Golden Bears went 22–10 and made it to the NCAA tournament, where they lost in the first round to Maryland.

On February 27, 2010, Cal defeated Arizona State, 62–46, to clinch at least a tie for the Pacific-10 Conference championship, the first for the school since 1960. On March 6, the Bears defeated Montgomery's former team, Stanford, 71–61, to clinch an undisputed conference championship. Cal was defeated by Washington in the finals of the Pac-10 tournament, but received a bid to the NCAA tournament, where they were seeded 8th in the South Region. The Bears advanced to the second round, where they were defeated by eventual National Champion Duke.

On March 31, 2014, Montgomery announced his retirement from California.

== NBA coaching career ==
Montgomery left Stanford to become the head coach of the Golden State Warriors on May 21, 2004. He coached the Warriors for two seasons, during each of which the team compiled identical 34-48 records. Montgomery was terminated as Warriors coach on August 29, 2006.

== Personal ==
In October 2011, Montgomery revealed that he had recently been diagnosed and treated for bladder cancer. After a surgical procedure was performed, Montgomery declared himself "cancer-free.

On February 18, 2013, Coach Montgomery was reprimanded by the Pac-12 Conference for shoving one of his players in the chest during a game against USC. The conference did not announce what punishment Montgomery received for his actions, although he was not suspended. Commissioner Larry Scott commented, "While emotions can run high in competitive environments, Pac-12 coaches are expected to conduct themselves in a manner that will reflect credit on the institution and the conference."

Montgomery and his wife Sara have two adult children; son John is an assistant coach at Hawaii.

== Head coaching record ==
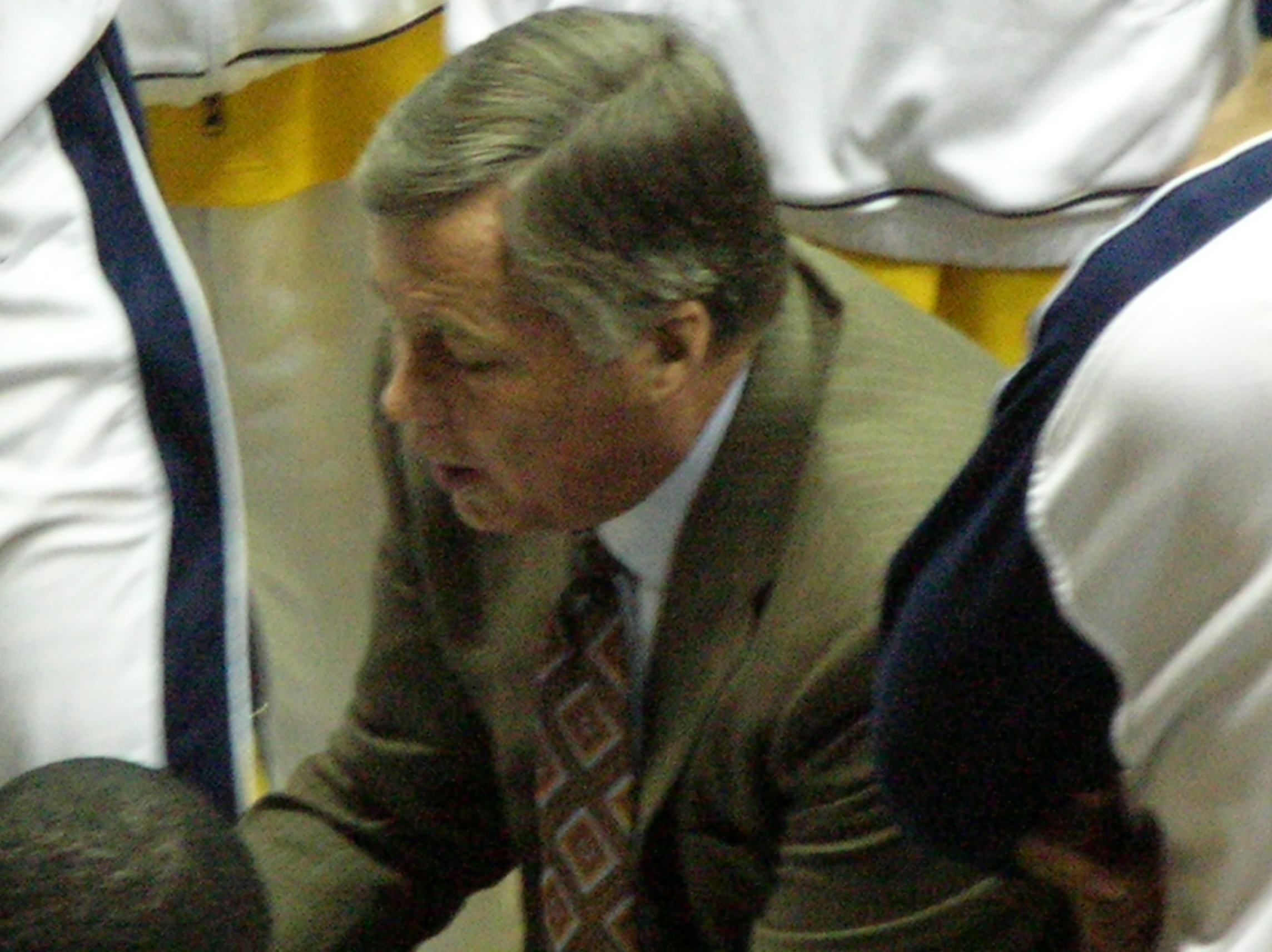
Montgomery huddles with his players in December 2008

=== College ===
Record table
Season	Team	Overall	Conference	Standing	Postseason
Montana Grizzlies (Big Sky Conference) (1978–1986)
1978–79	Montana	14–13	7–7	T–4th	
1979–80	Montana	17–11	8–6	3rd	
1980–81	Montana	19–9	11–3	2nd	
1981–82	Montana	17–10	10–4	2nd	
1982–83	Montana	21–8	9–5	3rd	
1983–84	Montana	23–7	9–5	2nd	
1984–85	Montana	22–8	10–4	2nd	NIT First Round
1985–86	Montana	21–11	9–5	T–1st	NIT First Round
Montana:		154–77 (.667)	73–39 (.652)		
Stanford Cardinal (Pacific-10 Conference) (1986–2004)
1986–87	Stanford	15–13	9–9	6th	
1987–88	Stanford	21–12	11–7	4th	NIT Second Round
1988–89	Stanford	26–7	15–3	2nd	NCAA Division I First Round
1989–90	Stanford	18–12	9–9	6th	NIT First Round
1990–91	Stanford	20–13	8–10	5th	NIT Champion
1991–92	Stanford	18–11	10–8	4th	NCAA Division I First Round
1992–93	Stanford	7–23	2–16	10th	
1993–94	Stanford	17–11	10–8	5th	NIT First Round
1994–95	Stanford	20–9	10–8	5th	NCAA Division I Second Round
1995–96	Stanford	21–8	12–6	3rd	NCAA Division I Second Round
1996–97	Stanford	22–8	12–6	T–2nd	NCAA Division I Sweet 16
1997–98	Stanford	30–5	15–3	2nd	NCAA Division I Final Four
1998–99	Stanford	26–7	15–3	1st	NCAA Division I Second Round
1999–00	Stanford	27–4	15–3	T–1st	NCAA Division I Second Round
2000–01	Stanford	31–3	16–2	1st	NCAA Division I Elite Eight
2001–02	Stanford	20–10	12–6	T–2nd	NCAA Division I Second Round
2002–03	Stanford	24–9	14–4	2nd	NCAA Division I Second Round
2003–04	Stanford	30–2	17–1	1st	NCAA Division I Second Round
Stanford:		393–167 (.702)	212–112 (.654)		
California Golden Bears (Pacific-10/Pac-12 Conference) (2008–2014)
2008–09	California	22–11	11–7	T–3rd	NCAA Division I First Round
2009–10	California	24–11	13–5	1st	NCAA Division I Second Round
2010–11	California	18–15	10–8	T–4th	NIT Second Round
2011–12	California	24–10	13–5	T–2nd	NCAA Division I First Four
2012–13	California	21–12	12–6	T–2nd	NCAA Division I Second Round
2013–14	California	21–14	10–8	T–3rd	NIT Quarterfinals
California:		130–73 (.640)	69–39 (.639)		
Total:		677–317 (.681)			
National champion Postseason invitational champion Conference regular season champion Conference regular season and conference tournament champion Division regular season champion Division regular season and conference tournament champion Conference tournament champion

=== NBA ===
Legend
Regular season	G	Games coached	W	Games won	L	Games lost	W–L %	Win–loss %
Playoffs	PG	Playoff games	PW	Playoff wins	PL	Playoff losses	PW–L %	Playoff win–loss %

Team	Year	G	W	L	W–L%	Finish	PG	PW	PL	PW–L%	Result
Golden State	2004–05	82	34	48	.415	5th in Pacific	—	—	—	—	Missed playoffs
Golden State	2005–06	82	34	48	.415	5th in Pacific	—	—	—	—	Missed playoffs
Career		164	68	96	.415		—	—	—	—	

== See also ==
- List of college men's basketball coaches with 600 wins
- List of NCAA Division I Men's Final Four appearances by coach
