= Tom Urbani =

American baseball player (1968–2022)

- Pitcher
- Born: January 21, 1968; Santa Cruz, California, U.S.
- Died: September 28, 2022 (aged 54); Santa Cruz, California, U.S.
- Batted: Left Threw: Left

MLB debut
- April 21, 1993, for the St. Louis Cardinals

Last MLB appearance
- August 4, 1996, for the Detroit Tigers

MLB statistics
- Win–loss record: 10–17
- Earned run average: 4.98
- Strikeouts: 149
- Stats at Baseball Reference

Teams
- St. Louis Cardinals (1993–1996); Detroit Tigers (1996)

Thomas James Urbani (January 21, 1968 – September 28, 2022) was an American professional baseball pitcher who played in Major League Baseball for four seasons. He pitched for the St. Louis Cardinals from 1993 through the 1996 midseason, before joining the Detroit Tigers for the rest of the season. He also pitched in the Italian Baseball League and coached youth baseball after his playing career.

== Early life and career ==
Urbani was born in Santa Cruz, California, on January 21, 1968. His great-grandfather, Giuseppi, immigrated to Santa Cruz from Italy in 1906. Urbani played Little League Baseball in Santa Cruz. He attended Harbor High School, and was named the Santa Cruz Sentinel's All-Santa Cruz County high school baseball player of the year after he had a .493 batting average and a 1.13 earned run average (ERA). Urbani then enrolled at Cabrillo College, where he played college baseball for two years. In 1988, he was named the Coast Conference's player of the year.

Urbani transferred to California State University, Long Beach, where he played college baseball for the Long Beach State Dirtbags baseball team for two years. He was a member of the "original Dirtbags", the Long Beach State 49ers baseball players who practiced on a dirt field while the university renovated their facilities, which generated a new nickname that stuck. With Long Beach State, Urbani played as a pitcher, a first baseman, and a designated hitter. Urbani participated in the 1989 College World Series with Long Beach State.

Urbani was selected in the Major League Baseball (MLB) draft three times without signing. He was drafted by the Kansas City Royals in the 33rd round in the 1986 MLB draft, the Texas Rangers in the 34th round of the 1988 MLB draft, and the Minnesota Twins in the 29th round of the 1989 MLB draft.

== Professional career ==
The St. Louis Cardinals selected Urbani in the 13th round of the 1990 MLB draft. He signed with the Cardinals, receiving a $1,000 signing bonus, and began his professional career with the Johnson City Cardinals of the Rookie-level Appalachian League. In August, he pitched for the Hamilton Redbirds of the Class A-Short Season New York-Penn League. Urbani began the 1991 season with the Springfield Cardinals of the Class A Midwest League and was promoted to the St. Petersburg Cardinals of the Class A-Advanced Florida State League during the season. Urbani began the 1992 season with the Arkansas Travelers of the Class AA Texas League and was promoted to the Louisville Redbirds of the Class AAA International League during the season. He returned to Louisville for the start of the 1993 season after he was the last pitcher cut by the Cardinals during spring training.

The Cardinals promoted Urbani to the major leagues on April 21, 1993, when René Arocha needed surgery for a broken finger. Urbani made his major league debut with the Cardinals that day. The Cardinals shuttled Urbani back and forth between St. Louis and Louisville, promoting him to the major leagues four times during the 1993 season. The Cardinals transitioned Urbani from a starting pitcher to a relief pitcher for the 1994 season. Urbani underwent surgery after the 1995 season to repair a damaged rotator cuff. Urbani started the 1996 season with St. Louis, but struggled to a 7.71 ERA and was demoted to Louisville. On June 7, 1996, the Cardinals traded Urbani and Miguel Inzunza to the Detroit Tigers for Micah Franklin and Brian Maxcy. The Tigers released Urbani after the 1996 season.

Urbani last pitched in MLB in 1996 for Detroit. In his four MLB seasons, he had a 10–17 win–loss record and a 4.98 ERA with 149 strikeouts in 260 1/3 innings pitched. He pitched in the minor leagues for the Oklahoma City 89ers in the Rangers organization and for the Ottawa Lynx in the Montreal Expos organization in 1997. He signed a minor league contract with Boston Red Sox in 1998 and attended spring training with them, but was released before the beginning of the season. He signed a minor league contract with the Cardinals for the 1998 season and pitched for the Memphis Redbirds, the Cardinals' new Class AAA affiliate, before he was released in June. He announced his retirement from baseball, but signed with the Reno Chukars of the Western Baseball League, an independent baseball league, in July 1998.

In 1999, Urbani ended his professional career while pitching for the Rimini Baseball Club of the Italian Baseball League. In his only season in the league, Urbani led all pitchers with 12 wins and a 1.35 ERA. Afterwards, he guided Rimini to the best-of-seven championship series with a victory over the Nettuno Baseball Club. Urbani pitched the fifth perfect game in Italian baseball history against the San Marino Baseball Club in the regular season, which was also the only one in the 40-years' history of the Rimini team. In that summer, Urbani also played as a starting pitcher for the Italian national baseball team in the 1999 European Baseball Championship, a pre-Olympic European tournament. He helped Italy earn the silver medal, earning a berth in the 2000 Summer Olympics.

== Personal life ==
During his career, Urbani bought a house in Carson City, Nevada, on the recommendation of Donovan Osborne, a teammate and Carson City native. Urbani held youth baseball clinics in Carson City during the offseason.

After his professional career, Urbani worked as a mortgage broker in Santa Cruz and also coached for Harbor High and Scotts Valley High School in Scotts Valley, California. Urbani later moved near Folsom.

Urbani and his wife, Lisa, had three children. He died on September 28, 2022, at the age of 54.
