= 1991–92 Washington Huskies men's basketball team =

American college basketball season

1991–92 Washington Huskies men's basketball
- Conference: Pacific-10 Conference
- Record: 12–17 (5–13 Pac-10)
- Head coach: Lynn Nance (3rd season)
- Assistant coach: Trent Johnson (3rd season)
- Home arena: Hec Edmundson Pavilion

1991–92 Pacific-10 Conference men's basketball standings
	Conf.				Overall
Team	W		L	PCT	W		L	PCT
No. 4 UCLA	16	–	2	.889	28	–	5	.848
No. 8 USC	15	–	3	.833	24	–	6	.800
No. 10 Arizona	13	–	5	.722	24	–	7	.774
Stanford	10	–	8	.556	18	–	11	.621
Washington State	9	–	9	.500	22	–	11	.667
Arizona State	9	–	9	.500	19	–	14	.576
Oregon State	7	–	11	.389	15	–	16	.484
Washington	5	–	13	.278	12	–	17	.414
California	4	–	14	.222	10	–	18	.357
Oregon	2	–	16	.111	6	–	21	.222
As of April 15, 1991; Rankings from AP Poll

The 1991–92 Washington Huskies men's basketball team represented the University of Washington for the 1991–92 NCAA Division I men's basketball season. Led by third-year head coach Lynn Nance, the Huskies were members of the Pacific-10 Conference and played their home games on campus at Hec Edmundson Pavilion in Seattle, Washington.

The Huskies were 12–17 overall in the regular season and 5–13 in conference play, eighth in the standings.

There was no conference tournament this season; last played in 1990, it resumed in 2002.
