= Kristin Klein =

American volleyball player

Personal information
- Full name: Kristin Magdalen Klein (-Keefe)
- Born: March 20, 1970 (age 56); Santa Monica, California, U.S.
- Height: 6 ft 0 in (183 cm)
- Education: Stanford University

Volleyball information
- Position: Outside hitter
- Number: 6

National team
| 1992–1996 | United States |
Medal record
Women's volleyball
Representing the United States
FIVB World Grand Prix
| Gold medal – first place | 1995 Shanghai |
Pan American Games
| Silver medal – second place | 1995 Mar del Plata | Team |
World Student Games
| Bronze medal – third place | 1991 Sheffield | Team |

Kristin Klein Keefe (née Kristin Magdalen Klein; born March 20, 1970), more commonly known as Kristin Klein, is an American retired volleyball player who played as an outside hitter. She represented the United States national team at the 1996 Summer Olympics in Atlanta, finishing in seventh place.

Klein played as a member of the United States B-team at the 1991 Pan American Games. She also played at the 1991 Summer Universiade in Sheffield, where she won a bronze medal.

Klein joined the United States national team in August 1992. In 1995, she won a silver medal at the Pan American Games in Mar del Plata. She then won a gold medal at the 1995 FIVB Grand Prix in Shanghai.

== College ==
Klein played college women's volleyball for Stanford University, where she was a four-time All-American from 1988 to 1991. In 1991, she was selected as Volleyball Monthly's Player of the Year.

== International competitions ==
- 1991 – Pan American Games
- 1991 – World University Games (bronze)
- 1993 – NORCECA Zone Championship (silver)
- 1994 – World Grand Prix
- 1994 – World Championship
- 1995 – NORCECA Zone Championship
- 1995 – World Grand Prix (gold)
- 1995 – Pan American Games (silver)
- 1996 – Summer Olympics (7th place)

== Personal life ==
Klein is married to former Stanford basketball and NBA player Adam Keefe; both were inducted into the Stanford Athletic Hall of Fame in 2000. They have two daughters, Caitlin and Michaela, who were on the Stanford women's volleyball team from 2016 to 2020. They also have a son, James, who is on the Stanford men's basketball team.
