= 1995–96 Arizona Wildcats men's basketball team =

American college basketball season

1995–96 Arizona Wildcats men's basketball

Preseason NIT Champions

NCAA tournament, Sweet 16
- Conference: Pacific-10 Conference

Ranking
- Coaches: No. 11
- AP: No. 11
- Record: 26–7 (13–5 Pac-10)
- Head coach: Lute Olson (13th season)
- Assistant coaches: Jim Rosborough (7th season); Jessie Evans (8th season); Phil Johnson (3rd season)
- Home arena: McKale Center

1995–96 Pacific-10 Conference men's basketball standings
	Conf.				Overall
Team	W		L	PCT	W		L	PCT
No. 14 UCLA	16	–	2	.889	23	–	8	.742
No. 11 Arizona	14	–	4	.778	27	–	6	.818
Stanford	12	–	6	.667	21	–	8	.724
Washington State	9	–	9	.500	18	–	11	.621
Washington	9	–	9	.500	16	–	12	.571
Oregon	9	–	9	.500	16	–	13	.552
USC	6	–	12	.333	13	–	17	.433
Arizona State	6	–	12	.333	11	–	16	.407
Oregon State	4	–	14	.222	6	–	21	.222
California^{1}	2	–	16	.111	2	–	26	.071
As of November 23, 2011; Rankings from AP Poll^{1}California forfeited games due to infractions.

The 1995–96 Arizona Wildcats men's basketball team represented the University of Arizona. The team's head coach was Lute Olson. The team played its home games in McKale Center as members of the Pacific-10 Conference.

After going 13–5 to finish second in the Pac-10 regular-season, the team was seeded third in the West region of the NCAA tournament. They advanced to the Sweet Sixteen before falling to #4 Kansas 83–80 in the regional semifinal. The team finished with a record of 26–7.

== Roster ==
1995–96 Arizona Wildcats men's basketball team
Players
Coaches

Pos.	#	Name	Height	Weight	Year	Hometown
F	4	Ben Davis	6 ft 8 in (2.03 m)	240 lb (109 kg)	Sr	Fort Pierce, FL
F	13	Donnell Harris	6 ft 11 in (2.11 m)	—	Fr	Salinas, CA
F	23	Michael Dickerson	6 ft 5 in (1.96 m)	180 lb (82 kg)	So	Seattle, WA
G	31	Jason Terry	6 ft 2 in (1.88 m)	180 lb (82 kg)	Fr	Seattle, WA
G	34	Miles Simon	6 ft 4 in (1.93 m)	190 lb (86 kg)	So	Fullerton, CA
F	42	A. J. Bramlett	6 ft 11 in (2.11 m)	225 lb (102 kg)	Fr	Albuquerque, NM
G	44	Reggie Geary	6 ft 2 in (1.88 m)	185 lb (84 kg)	Sr	Santa Ana, CA
SF	33	Corey Williams	6 ft 6 in (1.98 m)	212 lb (96 kg)	Sr	Batavia, IL
F/C	50	Joseph Blair	6 ft 11 in (2.11 m)	260 lb (118 kg)	Sr	Houston, TX

Head coach

- Lute Olson (Augsburg)

Assistant coach(es)

Legend

- (C) Team captain
- (S) Suspended
- (I) Ineligible
- (W) Walk-on
- Injured
- Current redshirt

== Schedule and results ==
Date time, TV	Rank^{#}	Opponent^{#}	Result	Record	Site city, state
Regular season
11/15/1995*		Long Beach State	W 91-57	1-0	McKale Center; Tucson, AZ
11/17/1995*		at No. 16 Arkansas	W 83-73	2-0	Bud Walton Arena; Fayetteville, AR
11/22/1995*; ESPN	No. 19	vs. No. 16 Michigan; Preseason NIT Semifinal	W 86-79	3-0	Madison Square Garden; New York, NY
11/24/1995*; ESPN	No. 19	vs. No. 5 Georgetown; Preseason NIT Championship	W 91-81	4-0	Madison Square Garden (12,949); New York, NY
NCAA tournament
3/15/1996*	(3 W) No. 11	vs. (14 W) Valparaiso; West Regional 1st Round	W 90-51	25-6	Wells Fargo Arena; Tempe, AZ
3/17/1996*	(3 W) No. 11	vs. (6 W) No. 21 Iowa; West Regional 2nd Round	W 87-83	26-6	Wells Fargo Arena (12,441); Tempe, AZ
3/22/1996*	(3 W) No. 11	vs. (2 W) No. 4 Kansas; West Regional semifinal	L 80-83	26-7	McNichols Sports Arena; Denver, CO
*Non-conference game. ^{#}Rankings from AP Poll. (#) Tournament seedings in parentheses. W=West.

== Team players drafted into the NBA ==
Round	Pick	Player	NBA Team
2	35	Joseph Blair	Seattle SuperSonics
2	43	Ben Davis	Phoenix Suns
2	56	Reggie Geary	Cleveland Cavaliers
