= 1991–92 UCLA Bruins men's basketball team =

American college basketball season

1991–92 UCLA Bruins men's basketball

Pac-10 champions

NCAA men's Division I tournament, Elite Eight
- Conference: Pacific-10

Ranking
- Coaches: No. 5
- AP: No. 4
- Record: 28–5 (16–2, 1st Pac-10)
- Head coach: Jim Harrick (4th season)
- Assistant coaches: Mark Gottfried; Steve Lavin
- Home arena: Pauley Pavilion

1991–92 Pacific-10 Conference men's basketball standings
	Conf.				Overall
Team	W		L	PCT	W		L	PCT
No. 4 UCLA	16	–	2	.889	28	–	5	.848
No. 8 USC	15	–	3	.833	24	–	6	.800
No. 10 Arizona	13	–	5	.722	24	–	7	.774
Stanford	10	–	8	.556	18	–	11	.621
Washington State	9	–	9	.500	22	–	11	.667
Arizona State	9	–	9	.500	19	–	14	.576
Oregon State	7	–	11	.389	15	–	16	.484
Washington	5	–	13	.278	12	–	17	.414
California	4	–	14	.222	10	–	18	.357
Oregon	2	–	16	.111	6	–	21	.222
As of April 15, 1991; Rankings from AP Poll

The 1991–92 UCLA Bruins men's basketball team represented the University of California, Los Angeles in the 1991–92 NCAA Division I men's basketball season. Jim Harrick coached his fourth year for the Bruins. The Bruins started the season ranked 11th in the AP Poll and beat the #2 Indiana Hoosiers, 87–72, in their season opener at the Hall of Fame Tip-Off Classic (Springfield, Massachusetts). This UCLA squad won their first 14 games, which was their best start since John Wooden's 1972–73 team. For the first time since the 1986–87 season, the Bruins were Pac-10 conference champions with a 16–2 conference record (there was no Pac-10 tournament that year). The Bruins were given a #1 seed in the NCAA Tournament that year, but lost to Indiana in the Elite Eight, 106–79. UCLA finished ranked 3rd and 4th in the UPI and AP Polls respectively.

== Starting lineup ==
Position	Player	Class
F	Don MacLean	Sr.
F	Tracy Murray	Jr.
F	Mitchell Butler	Jr.
G	Gerald Madkins	Jr.
G	Shon Tarver	So.

== Roster ==
1991–92 UCLA Bruins men's basketball team
Players
Coaches

Pos.	#	Name	Height	Weight	Year	Hometown
G	23	Mitchell Butler	6 ft 5 in (1.96 m)	—	Jr	Los Angeles, California
G	11	Tyus Edney	5 ft 10 in (1.78 m)	—	Fr	Gardena, California
G	22	Steve Elkind	6 ft 5 in (1.96 m)	—	Jr
C	21	Mike Lanier	7 ft 6 in (2.29 m)	—	Jr
F	42	Don MacLean	6 ft 10 in (2.08 m)	—	Sr	Palo Alto, California
G	12	Gerald Madkins (C)	6 ft 4 in (1.93 m)	—	Sr	Merced, California
G	15	Darrick Martin	5 ft 11 in (1.8 m)	—	Sr	Denver, Colorado
F	30	Tracy Murray	6 ft 8 in (2.03 m)	—	Jr	Los Angeles, California
F	31	Ed O'Bannon	6 ft 8 in (2.03 m)	—	Fr	Los Angeles, California
G	21	Shon Tarver	6 ft 5 in (1.96 m)	—	So
C	25	George Zidek	7 ft 0 in (2.13 m)	—	Fr	Gottwaldov, Czechoslovakia
C	14	Rodney Zimmerman	6 ft 9 in (2.06 m)	—	So

Head coach

Jim Harrick (Morris Harvey College)

Assistant coach(es)

Legend

- (C) Team captain
- (S) Suspended
- (I) Ineligible
- (W) Walk-on
- Injured
- Current redshirt

== Schedule ==
Date time, TV	Rank^{#}	Opponent^{#}	Result	Record	Site city, state
Regular Season
November 15, 1991	No. 11	vs. No. 2 Indiana	W 87–72	1–0	Springfield Civic Center (8,500); Springfield, MA
November 30, 1991	No. 4	Long Beach State	W 68–57	2–0	Pauley Pavilion (8,384); Los Angeles, CA
December 7, 1991	No. 2	Pepperdine	W 98–58	3–0	Pauley Pavilion (10,413); Los Angeles, CA
December 14, 1991	No. 3	at San Diego State	W 84–64	4–0	San Diego Sports Arena (6,656); San Diego, CA
December 20, 1991	No. 3	Loyola Marymount	W 106–80	5–0	Pauley Pavilion (8,217); Los Angeles, CA
December 23, 1991	No. 2	Cal State Fullerton	W 86–80	6–0	Pauley Pavilion (7,569); Los Angeles, CA
December 28, 1991	No. 2	Oral Roberts	W 113–62	7–0	Pauley Pavilion (6,289); Los Angeles, CA
January 4, 1992	No. 2	Georgia	W 87–80	8–0	Pauley Pavilion (12,618); Los Angeles, CA
January 9, 1992	No. 2	at Arizona State	W 83–62	9–0 (1–0)	ASU Activity Center (11,598); Tempe, AZ
January 11, 1992	No. 2	at No. 6 Arizona	W 89–87	10–0 (2–0)	McKale Center (13,965); Tucson, AZ
January 16, 1992	No. 2	Oregon	W 99–71	11–0 (3–0)	Pauley Pavilion (12,102); Los Angeles, CA
January 18, 1992	No. 2	Oregon State	W 87–81 ^{OT}	12–0 (4–0)	Pauley Pavilion (11,921); Los Angeles, CA
January 23, 1992	No. 2	at California	W 86–66	13–0 (5–0)	Harmon Gym (15,039); Berkeley, CA
January 25, 1992	No. 2	at No. 24 Stanford	W 83–77	14–0 (6–0)	Maples Pavilion (7,500); Stanford, CA
January 29, 1992	No. 2	No. 25 USC	L 82–86	15–0 (6–1)	Pauley Pavilion (12,842); Los Angeles, CA
February 2, 1992	No. 2	at No. 24 Louisville	W 78–64	15–1	Freedom Hall (19,466); Louisville, KY
February 6, 1992	No. 4	Washington	W 74–61	16–1 (7–1)	Pauley Pavilion (11,686); Los Angeles, CA
February 8, 1992	No. 4	Washington State	W 82–61	17–1 (8–1)	Pauley Pavilion (12,041); Los Angeles, CA
February 13, 1992	No. 3	at Oregon State	W 72–62	18–1 (9–1)	Gill Coliseum (9,374); Corvallis, OR
February 15, 1992	No. 3	at Oregon	W 84–65	19–1 (10–1)	McArthur Court (7,061); Eugene, OR
February 18, 1992	No. 2	California	W 82–76	20–1 (11–1)	Pauley Pavilion (12,151); Los Angeles, CA
February 20, 1992	No. 2	Stanford	W 96–70	21–1 (12–1)	Pauley Pavilion (12,532); Los Angeles, CA
February 22, 1992	No. 2	at Notre Dame	L 71–84	21–2	Edmund P. Joyce Center (11,418); Notre Dame, IN
February 27, 1992	No. 4	at No. 13 USC	L 79–83	21–3 (12–2)	Los Angeles Memorial Sports Arena (15,517); Los Angeles, CA
March 1, 1992	No. 4	No. 1 Duke	L 65–75	21–4	Pauley Pavilion (13,023); Los Angeles, CA
March 5, 1992	No. 9	at Washington State	W 89–85	22–4 (13–2)	Beasley Coliseum (7,121); Pullman, WA
March 8, 1992	No. 9	at Washington	W 80–79	23–4 (14–2)	Hec Edmundson Pavilion (4,853); Seattle, WA
March 12, 1992	No. 8	No. 2 Arizona	W 89–81	24–4 (15–2)	Pauley Pavilion (12,898); Los Angeles, CA
March 14, 1992	No. 8	Arizona State	W 85–77	25–4 (16–2)	Pauley Pavilion (12,317); Los Angeles, CA
NCAA tournament
March 20, 1992	No. 4	vs. Robert Morris; First Round	W 73–53	26–4	ASU Activity Center (7,639); Tempe, AZ
March 22, 1992	No. 4	vs. Louisville; Second Round	W 85–69	27–4	ASU Activity Center (10,125); Tempe, AZ
March 26, 1992	No. 4	vs. New Mexico State; Sweet Sixteen	W 85–78	28–4	The Pit (15,914); Albuquerque, NM
March 28, 1992	No. 4	vs. No. 5 Indiana; Elite Eight	L 79–106	28–5	The Pit (16,106); Albuquerque, NM
*Non-conference game. ^{#}Rankings from AP Poll. (#) Tournament seedings in parentheses. All times are in Pacific Time.

== Notes ==
The 27-point loss to the Hoosiers in the tournament would go down as the worst loss (by margin of defeat) in UCLA's NCAA Tournament history. UCLA had beaten this Indiana Hoosiers squad in the first game of the season.
