= Harbor High School (California) =

Coordinates: 36.9863°N 121.9943°W

Location
- 300 La Fonda Avenue; Santa Cruz, California 95062; United States of America

Information
- Established: 1968
- Principal: Amariah Hernandez
- Teaching staff: 54.83 (FTE)
- Grades: 9-12
- Age range: 13-19
- Student to teacher ratio: 18.97
- Colors: Green; Gold
- Mascot: Pirate
- Rivals: Santa Cruz High Soquel High School
- Tuition: Public
- Website: hh.sccs.net

Harbor High School is a high school located in Santa Cruz, California, with roughly 950 members of its student body. The mascot, Petey the Pirate, sports the school colors of green and gold.

== Arts programs ==
Harbor High is well known for its variety of arts programs. The school's theater department offers a student-directed play and musical each year, amassing over 100 participants in total. Harbor High School has an award-winning music program that boasts over 120 members and offers band, varsity band, and their prestigious jazz ensemble. Harbor High also hosts Escapade, a local dance group also run by students.

== Sports ==
Harbor competes in the Santa Cruz Coast Athletic League alongside Santa Cruz High School, Scotts Valley High School, Soquel High School, San Lorenzo Valley High School and Aptos High School.

The school has somewhat of a notorious history with football, winning its first varsity game since 2008 on August 31, 2019. Harbor lost the Monterey Bay League Championship in 1973 in a close battle with Monterey High School.

Harbor High School has seen notable athletic success over the years. The Girls' Soccer team won 9 CCS Championships in 14 years. The boys’ swim team has claimed 26 SCCAL Championships in the school’s 40-year history. In 2021, the Boys' Soccer team won the CCS Division IV Championship, defeating Carmel in overtime.

Recently Harbor has made great strides in surf competitions, even getting an article on the National Surf League Website.

== The Conch ==
As Harbor and Santa Cruz are the only two teams within the City of Santa Cruz, the Pirates and Cardinals annually compete for the City Championship in football represented by a large Conch Shell trophy. Beginning in 2004, Harbor won the Shell 3 consecutive times. Santa Cruz has won the last 2 games. 2004: Santa Cruz 21, Harbor 23; 2005: Harbor 35, Santa Cruz 15; 2006: Santa Cruz 6, Harbor 28; 2007: Harbor 0, Santa Cruz 49; 2008: Santa Cruz 27, Harbor 14. As of the 2012 season Harbor holds the Conch until 2015.

== Notable alumni ==
- Jennifer Otter Bickerdike, Music Writer and Presenter
- Juli Simpson Inkster, LPGA professional golfer
- Bill Miller, Major League Baseball umpire
- Wali Razaqi, film producer and actor
- Adam Scott, actor
- Tim Young, former NBA center
- Oliver Tree, musician
- Tom Urbani, baseball player

== See also ==
- Santa Cruz County high schools
