= Todd Lichti =

American basketball player (born 1967)

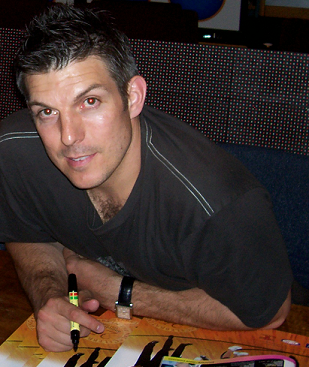
- Lichti in 2007

Personal information
- Born: January 8, 1967 (age 59) Walnut Creek, California, U.S.
- Listed height: 6 ft 4 in (1.93 m)
- Listed weight: 205 lb (93 kg)

Career information
- High school: Mount Diablo (Concord, California)
- College: Stanford (1985–1989)
- NBA draft: 1989: 1st round, 15th overall pick
- Drafted by: Denver Nuggets
- Playing career: 1989–1999
- Position: Shooting guard
- Number: 21, 24, 22, 30

Career history
- 1989–1993: Denver Nuggets
- 1993–1994: Orlando Magic
- 1994: Golden State Warriors
- 1994: Boston Celtics
- 1996–1999: Perth Wildcats

Career highlights
- Consensus second-team All-American (1989); 4× First-team All-Pac-10 (1986–1989)
- Stats at NBA.com
- Stats at Basketball Reference
- Collegiate Basketball Hall of Fame

Todd Samuel Lichti (born January 8, 1967) is an American former professional basketball player. At 6 ft 4 in (1.93 m) and 205 pounds (93 kg) he played at guard. He was selected with 15th pick in the 1989 NBA draft by the Denver Nuggets where he stayed for 4 years. He also had short stints with Orlando Magic, Golden State Warriors, and Boston Celtics before moving to Australia to play for the Perth Wildcats.

Lichti was inducted into the College Basketball Hall of Fame in 2019.

== College career ==
In four seasons with Stanford, Lichti averaged 18.8 points per game, 5.3 rebounds per game, and 2.5 assists per game, appearing in 124 games. At graduation, Lichti was Stanford's all-time leading scorer with 2,336 points, a record broken by Chasson Randle on March 31, 2015.

== Professional career ==
=== NBA ===
Lichti started his professional career when he was drafted via the 15th overall pick by the Denver Nuggets in the 1989 NBA draft. With the Nuggets, he performed well in his first season (8 points per game), and continued to improve in his second season (14 points per game), before knee injuries limited him to 29 of 82 contests. Various injuries (including being involved in a serious car accident, which killed his fiancée, Kirstin Gravrock of Bellevue, Washington) further kept him from playing at a competitive level. Lichti stayed on in Denver for two more seasons until August 19, 1993, when he was traded to the Orlando Magic for Brian Williams. He played a combined 13 games with three different teams before being waived by the Golden State Warriors in 1993-94, his final NBA season.

=== NBL ===
His last appearance was in the Australian National Basketball League with the Perth Wildcats. Lichti's recruitment was in part due to his association with native Perth player Andrew Vlahov, with whom he was teammates at Stanford. Lichti played 82 games over four seasons for the Wildcats from 1996 to 1999, and averaged impressive NBL career stats of 16.8 points, 5.4 rebounds, 2.7 assists and 1.6 steals per game.
