= Lorenzo Orr =

American basketball player

Personal information
- Born: January 20, 1971 (age 55) Detroit, Michigan, U.S.
- Listed height: 6 ft 8 in (2.03 m)
- Listed weight: 242 lb (110 kg)

Career information
- High school: Detroit Southeastern
- College: USC (1991–1995)
- Position: Power forward / center

Career history
- 1995–1996: Chicago Rockers
- 1997–1998: Wisconsin Blast
- 1998–1999: Thor Akureyri
- 1999: Wisconsin Blast
- 1999–2000: Tadamon Zouk
- 2000–2001: MZT Skopje
- 2002–2003: Élan Chalon
- 2003–2004: Saint-Quentin Basket
- 2004–2005: Orléans Loiret Basket
- 2005–2006: Porto Ferpinta
- 2006–2007: Fribourg Olympic
- 2007–2008: ADA Blois Basket
- 2008–2009: CS Autun Basket
- 2009–2010: ADA Blois Basket
- 2010–2011: ALS Basket Andrézieux

Career highlights
- First-team All-Pac-10 (1994)

Lorenzo Orr (born January 20, 1971) is an American former professional basketball player who had 12-year career in Europe. He played college basketball for USC Trojans.
