= Cameron Dollar =

American college basketball coach (born 1975)

Biographical details
- Born: December 9, 1975 (age 50); Atlanta, Georgia, U.S.

Playing career
- 1993–1997: UCLA
- Position: Guard

Coaching career (HC unless noted)
- 1997–1998: UC Irvine (assistant)
- 1998–1999: Southern California College
- 1999: Georgia (assistant)
- 1999–2002: Saint Louis (assistant)
- 2002–2009: Washington (assistant)
- 2009–2017: Seattle
- 2017–2021: Washington (assistant)

Head coaching record
- Overall: 118–160
- Tournaments: 3–2 (CBI)

Cameron Dollar (born December 9, 1975) is an American college basketball coach who was most recently an assistant coach for the Washington Huskies. He was previously an assistant coach at Washington before serving as the head coach for the Seattle Redhawks. Dollar played college basketball for the UCLA Bruins, and was a member of their 1995 national championship team. In the championship game against Arkansas, he replaced injured starter Tyus Edney.

== Early life ==
Dollar was born in Atlanta. His father Donald was a longtime high school basketball coach in Georgia who won three state championships and more than 600 games. Dollar's mother was murdered in Atlanta when Cameron was four years old. Her killer has never been identified.

Dollar played at Douglass High School in Atlanta as a sophomore under his father. After his father briefly stopped coaching to become a school administrator, Dollar attended a pair of prep schools in Maryland.

== College career ==
While in Maryland, Dollar was recruited to the University of California, Los Angeles (UCLA) by Bruins assistant coach Mark Gottfried. Dollar attended UCLA in the fall of 1993. Leading up to the final game against Arkansas in the 1995 NCAA tournament, the team was uncertain of the status of Tyus Edney, their starting point guard, who had injured his wrist in the semifinals against Oklahoma State. After Edney did not return after leaving less than three minutes into the Arkansas game, Dollar played 36 minutes and contributed eight assists and four steals as UCLA won the championship game, 89–78. Asked if UCLA would have won without Dollar's performance, then-UCLA coach Jim Harrick said, "Absolutely not." Earlier in the tournament against Missouri, Dollar inbounded the ball with 4.8 seconds left in the game to Edney, who drove the length of the court and hit a bank shot as time expired to win 75–74 in the second round. Dollar would repeat the feat himself 2 years later in the 1997 NCAA tournament, going coast to coast and hitting the game winner against Iowa State to advance to the Elite 8.

Dollar started in his last two seasons, and the Bruins won three Pacific-10 Conference championships. During his four-year career, Dollar averaged 5.0 points, 3.7 assists and 2.3 rebounds. "His leadership qualities were off the charts," Harrick said. "He was always an extension of the coach on the floor."

== Coaching career ==
At age 22, Dollar was the country's youngest college coach when he was first hired as a head coach at Southern California College, a National Association of Intercollegiate Athletics (NAIA) school (now known as Vanguard University). He served ten years (1999–2009) as an assistant with Saint Louis and Washington under head coach Lorenzo Romar, who was an assistant at UCLA during Dollar's playing career. At Washington, Dollar received a one-month suspension in 2002 for a recruiting violation.

Dollar was hired in the spring of 2009 as the head coach of Seattle, which was transitioning to compete in Division I after dropping out in 1980. He hired his father as an assistant. Dollar was fired after eight seasons. He was re-hired as an assistant at Washington under new coach Mike Hopkins.

== Head coaching record ==
Record table
Season	Team	Overall	Conference	Standing	Postseason
Southern California College Lions (Golden State Athletic Conference) (1998–1999)
1998–99	Southern California College	11–22	5–9	6th	
Southern California College:		11–22 (.333)	5–9 (.357)		
Seattle Redhawks (NCAA Division I independent) (2009–2012)
2009–10	Seattle	17–14			
2010–11	Seattle	11–20			
2011–12	Seattle	12–15			
Seattle Redhawks (Western Athletic Conference) (2012–2017)
2012–13	Seattle	8–22	3–15	10th	
2013–14	Seattle	13–17	5–11	7th	
2014–15	Seattle	18–16	7–7	T–4th	CBI Semifinals
2015–16	Seattle	15–17	7–7	4th	CBI Quarterfinals
2016–17	Seattle	13–17	5–9	6th	
Seattle University:		107–138 (.437)	27–46 (.370)		
Total:		118–160 (.424)			
National champion Postseason invitational champion Conference regular season champion Conference regular season and conference tournament champion Division regular season champion Division regular season and conference tournament champion Conference tournament champion

== Personal ==
Dollar has three children. His brother Chad served as an assistant coach at Arkansas State. Dollar is a Christian.
