= Doug Oliver =

Biographical details
- Born: August 28, 1951 (age 75); San Jose, California, U.S.
- Education: San Jose State University

Coaching career (HC unless noted)
- 1973–1975: West Valley JC (asst.)
- 1975–1976: Tulelake HS
- 1976–1980: Boise State (men's asst.)
- 1980–1981: Whitefish HS
- 1981–1982: Saratoga HS
- 1982–1985: Lynbrook HS
- 1985–1986: Utah (men's asst.)
- 1986–1998: Stanford (men's asst.)
- 1998–2006: Idaho State (men's)
- 2006–2008: Stanford (men's asst.)
- 2009–2011: UC Irvine (men's asst.)
- 2011–2012: UC Irvine (women's asst.)
- 2012–2016: UC Irvine (women's)

Head coaching record
- Overall: 88–134 (men's basketball); 38–87(women's basketball)

Douglas Patrick Oliver (born August 28, 1951) was the head basketball coach for the women's team at UC Irvine. He previously served as special assistant to UCI athletic director Mike Izzi.

== Head coaching record ==
=== Men's basketball ===
Record table
Season	Team	Overall	Conference	Standing	Postseason
Idaho State Bengals (Big Sky Conference) (1998–2006)
1998–99	Idaho State	6–20	4–12	8th	
1999–2000	Idaho State	8–19	3–13	9th	
2000–01	Idaho State	14–14	10–6	3rd	
2001–02	Idaho State	10–17	3–11	T–7th	
2002–03	Idaho State	15–14	7–7	T–3rd	
2003–04	Idaho State	15–14	7–7	T–2nd	
2004–05	Idaho State	9–18	3–13	8th	
2005–06	Idaho State	13–14	4–10	T–7th	
Idaho State:		88–134 (.396)	41–79 (.342)		
Total:		88–134 (.396)			

Women's basketball

Record table
Season	Team	Overall	Conference	Standing	Postseason
UC Irvine Anteaters (Big West Conference) (2012–2016)
2012–13	UC Irvine	9–21	5–13	T–8th	
2013–14	UC Irvine	17–15	9–7	T–4th	
2014–15	UC Irvine	8–24	5–11	T–7th	
2015–16	UC Irvine	4–27	1–15	T–8th	
UC Irvine:		38–87 (.304)	20–46 (.303)		
Total:		38–87 (.304)			
