= Matt Othick =

American basketball player, film producer, and restaurateur (born 1969)

Personal information
- Born: March 16, 1969 (age 57) Clovis, New Mexico, U.S.
- Listed height: 6 ft 2 in (1.88 m)
- Listed weight: 195 lb (88 kg)

Career information
- High school: Bishop Gorman (Las Vegas, Nevada)
- College: Arizona (1988–1992)
- NBA draft: 1992: undrafted
- Position: Point guard
- Number: 12

Career history
- 1992: San Antonio Spurs
- 1992–1993: Omaha Racers
- 1993–1994: Fargo-Moorhead Fever
- 1998–1999: Yakima Sun Kings
- Stats at NBA.com
- Stats at Basketball Reference

Matthew Brian Othick (born March 16, 1969) is an American former professional basketball player, independent film producer, and restaurateur.

== Biography ==
Born in Clovis, New Mexico, Othick played basketball at Bishop Gorman high school in Las Vegas, Nevada, where he was named two-time Nevada state player of the year in 1987 and 1988. He played college basketball at the University of Arizona from 1989 to 1992. He is one of a small group of Arizona players to score over 1000 points and dish out 500 plus assists in his career. He went on to play with the NBA's San Antonio Spurs in 1992. A 6-foot-2-inch (1.88 m), 175-pound (79 kg) point guard, he continued his pro basketball career with the Omaha Racers 1992–1993, Fargo Fever 1994-1996 and Yakima Sun Kings in the CBA1998.

In 2006, Othick was part of group developing a film based on the life of his former high school and college teammate, the late Bison Dele (then known as Brian Williams), who presumably died during a boat trip in 2002. With his brother, Trent, Othick helped finance the Magnolia Pictures film Yonkers Joe, on which he is listed as an executive producer.

As of 2008, Othick is a Las Vegas and Del Mar, California-based land broker/investor.

Othick opened Crust Pizzeria in Carlsbad, California, in 2011. He went on to open and operate two more locations, one in San Diego, California, in 2014 and his latest in Solana Beach, California, in 2018.
