= Adam Keefe (basketball) =

American retired basketball player

Personal information
- Born: February 22, 1970 (age 56) Irvine, California, U.S.
- Listed height: 6 ft 9 in (2.06 m)
- Listed weight: 230 lb (104 kg)

Career information
- High school: Woodbridge (Irvine, California)
- College: Stanford (1988–1992)
- NBA draft: 1992: 1st round, 10th overall pick
- Drafted by: Atlanta Hawks
- Playing career: 1992–2003
- Position: Power forward / center
- Number: 31, 32

Career history
- 1992–1994: Atlanta Hawks
- 1994–2000: Utah Jazz
- 2000–2001: Golden State Warriors
- 2001–2002: Casademont Girona
- 2002–2003: Estudiantes

Career highlights
- Torneo Comunidad de Madrid champion (2002); Second-team All-American – AP (1992); Third-team All-American – NABC, UPI (1992); 3× First-team All-Pac-10 (1990–1992); Fourth-team Parade All-American (1988)

Career NBA statistics
- Points: 3,107 (5.0 ppg)
- Rebounds: 2,556 (4.1 rpg)
- Stats at NBA.com
- Stats at Basketball Reference
Medals
Men's Basketball
Representing the United States
Pan American Games
Bronze medal – third place	1991 Havana	Team competition

Adam Thomas Keefe (born February 22, 1970) is an American former professional basketball player. He played college basketball for the Stanford Cardinal. The tenth overall pick in the 1992 NBA draft by the Atlanta Hawks, Keefe played in the National Basketball Association (NBA) from 1992 to 2001 and in Spain from 2001 to 2003.

== Early life and college career ==
Born and raised in Irvine, California, Keefe played basketball for Woodbridge High School. As a senior at Woodbridge in 1988, Keefe was the USA Today California Athlete of the Year. From 1988 to 1992, Keefe attended Stanford University, where he earned a degree in political science while a member of both the basketball and volleyball teams. He finished as the Pac-10's fifth all-time scorer and fourth all-time rebounder. He led the conference in rebounding for three seasons and as a senior averaged 25.3 points and 12.2 rebounds per game. Keefe was an honorable mention Associated Press (AP) All-American in 1991 and second-team AP All-American in 1992.

== Pro basketball career ==
In the 1992 NBA draft, the Atlanta Hawks selected Keefe with the 10th overall pick. He eventually spent nine years in the NBA, mainly with the Utah Jazz. Keefe's NBA career eventually ended as a member of the Golden State Warriors. In nine seasons, Keefe played in 617 games and averaged 5.0 points, 4.1 rebounds, and 0.7 assists.

From 2001 to 2003, Keefe played professional basketball in Spain, first for Casademont Girona of Liga ACB in 2001–02 averaging 13.9 points and 9.9 rebounds. Then in 2002–03, Keefe played for CB Estudiantes of Liga ACB, averaging 6.8 points and 5.2 rebounds.

== Post-playing career ==
After retiring from basketball, Keefe became a financial advisor.

In 2005, Keefe collaborated with former NBA player Ed O'Bannon to coach the Pump N Run youth basketball league based in Los Angeles. In 2021, Keefe led the "36 Sports Strong" campaign that successfully persuaded Stanford to reverse a 2020 decision to cut 11 varsity sports including field hockey and wrestling.

== Personal life ==
Keefe married US volleyball team member Kristin Klein. They have four children. Their twin daughters, Caitlin and Michaela, were on the Stanford women's volleyball team until their graduation in 2020. Their youngest daughter, Kerry, joined the Duke women's volleyball team in 2022. Their son, James, became a member of the Stanford men's basketball team in 2019.

== See also ==
- List of NCAA Division I men's basketball players with 2000 points and 1000 rebounds
