= Jelani McCoy =

American basketball player (born 1977)

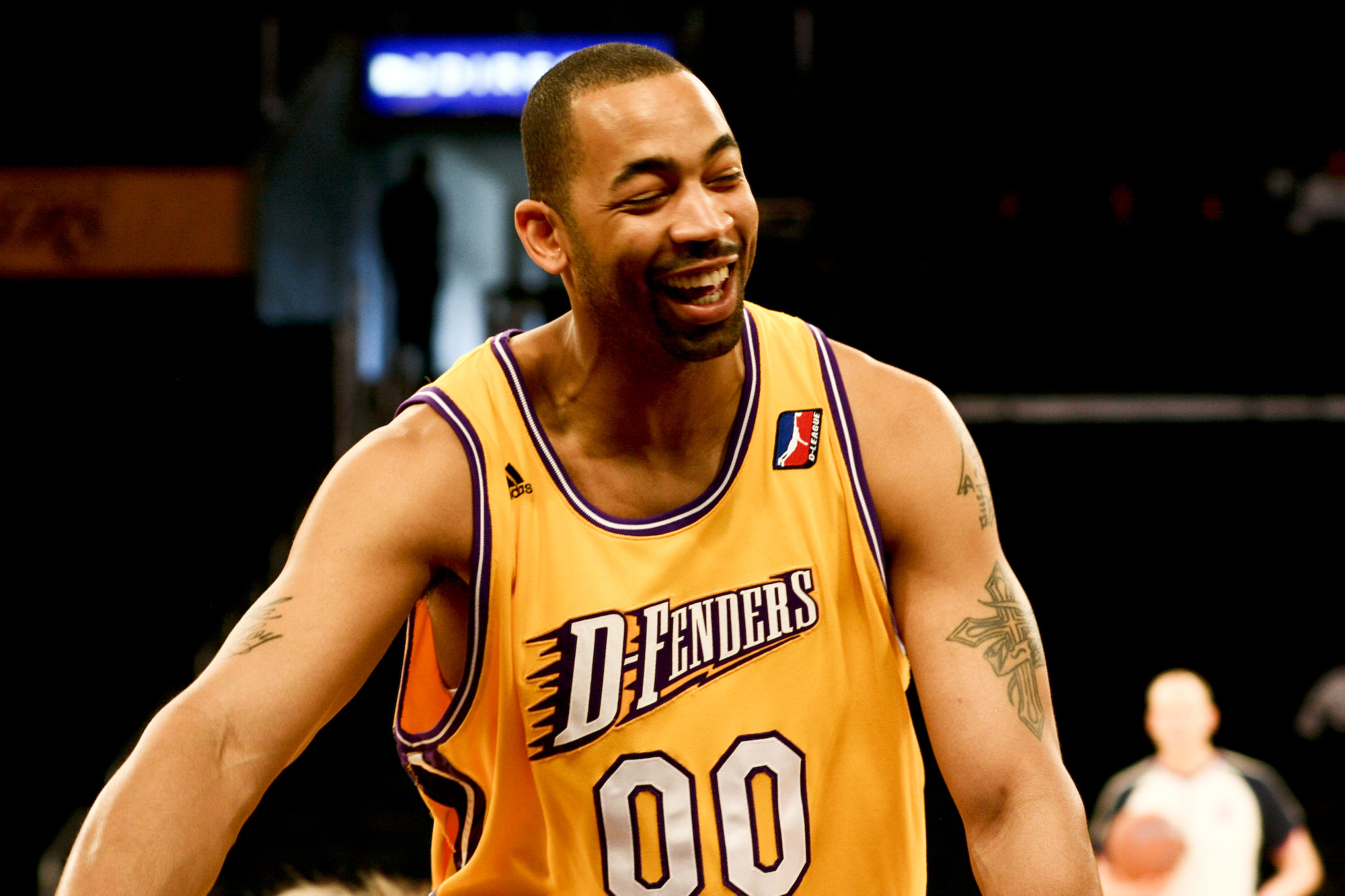
- McCoy with the Los Angeles D-Fenders in 2008

Personal information
- Born: December 6, 1977 (age 48) Oakland, California, U.S.
- Listed height: 6 ft 10 in (2.08 m)
- Listed weight: 245 lb (111 kg)

Career information
- High school: St. Augustine (San Diego, California)
- College: UCLA (1995–1998)
- NBA draft: 1998: 2nd round, 33rd overall pick
- Drafted by: Seattle SuperSonics
- Playing career: 1998–2013
- Position: Power forward / center
- Number: 34, 6, 4, 32

Career history
- 1998–2001: Seattle SuperSonics
- 2001–2002: Los Angeles Lakers
- 2002–2003: Toronto Raptors
- 2003–2004: Cleveland Cavaliers
- 2004: Atlanta Hawks
- 2004–2005: Long Beach Jam
- 2004–2005: Jiangsu Nangang Dragons
- 2005–2006: Reggio Calabria
- 2005–2006: Azovmash Mariupol
- 2007: Menorca Bàsquet
- 2007: Santa Barbara Breakers
- 2007–2008: Denver Nuggets
- 2007–2008: Los Angeles D-Fenders
- 2009: Zhejiang Guangsha
- 2009–2010: Fujian Xunxing
- 2010–2011: Cáceres 2016
- 2011: Mets de Guaynabo
- 2012: Marinos de Anzoátegui
- 2012: Osos de Guadalajara

Career highlights
- NBA champion (2002); All-NBA D-League Third Team (2008); First-team All-Pac-10 (1997); McDonald's All-American (1995)

Career NBA statistics
- Points: 1,200 (4.6 ppg)
- Rebounds: 921 (3.5 rpg)
- Blocks: 193 (0.7 bpg)
- Stats at NBA.com
- Stats at Basketball Reference

Jelani Marwan McCoy (born December 6, 1977) is an American former professional basketball player. A 6'10" power forward/center, he played in the NBA from 1998 to 2007 for the Seattle SuperSonics, Los Angeles Lakers, Toronto Raptors, Cleveland Cavaliers, Atlanta Hawks, and Denver Nuggets. He attended college at UCLA and high school at St. Augustine High School in San Diego, California.

== College career ==
In 1998, was UCLA's career leader in blocked shots.

McCoy was suspended in late September 1997 for violating "unspecified" team rules but reinstated three months later.

== Professional career ==
McCoy compiled NBA career averages of 4.7 points and 3.6 rebounds. He was part of the Los Angeles Lakers team that won the 2002 NBA Finals, but he was injured most of the season and was not on their playoff roster.

McCoy played for the Denver Nuggets in the NBA Summer League in Las Vegas. In five games, McCoy averaged 9 points and 9 rebounds in 21 minutes per game. After averaging 8 points, 6.5 rebounds, 4 blocks and 3.5 assists in two games with the D-League's Los Angeles D-Fenders, McCoy was signed during the 2007-08 season in late November 2007 by the Nuggets to fill their depleted frontcourt after players Kenyon Martin, Nenê and Steven Hunter were unavailable due to injuries. Mike Wilks was waived to make room on the roster. On December 19, 2007, he was waived by the Denver Nuggets. McCoy started the 2008-09 preseason with the Los Angeles Clippers, but was waived before the start of the season.

On January 19, 2006, McCoy signed with Italian club Viola Reggio Calabria. In February 2007, he signed with Spanish club Menorca Bàsquet.
