= Tim Young (basketball) =

American basketball player (born 1976)

Personal information
- Born: February 6, 1976 (age 50) Santa Cruz, California, U.S.
- Listed height: 7 ft 2 in (2.18 m)
- Listed weight: 250 lb (113 kg)

Career information
- High school: Harbor (Santa Cruz, California)
- College: Stanford (1994–1999)
- NBA draft: 1999: 2nd round, 56th overall pick
- Drafted by: Golden State Warriors
- Playing career: 1999–2005
- Position: Center
- Number: 55

Career history
- 1999–2000: Golden State Warriors
- 2000–2001: Stal Ostrów Wielkopolski
- 2001: Polonia Warszawa
- 2001–2002: Baloncesto León
- 2002–2003: Cantabria Lobos
- 2004–2005: Gijón Baloncesto

Career highlights
- First-team All-Pac-10 (1998)
- Stats at NBA.com
- Stats at Basketball Reference
Medals
Men's basketball
Representing the United States
FIBA Americas U18 Championship
Gold medal – first place	1994 Santa Rosa	National team

Timothy Aaron Young (born February 6, 1976) is an American former professional basketball player.

Young, a seven-foot center, played collegiately at Stanford University and was selected in the 1999 NBA draft by the Golden State Warriors with the 27th pick of the second round (56th overall). He lasted 25 games with the Warriors in the 1999-2000 NBA season, averaging 2.2 points and 1.4 rebounds.

Young went to Harbor High School in Santa Cruz.

== NBA career statistics ==
Legend
GP	Games played	GS	Games started	MPG	Minutes per game
FG%	Field goal percentage	3P%	3-point field goal percentage	FT%	Free throw percentage
RPG	Rebounds per game	APG	Assists per game	SPG	Steals per game
BPG	Blocks per game	PPG	Points per game	**Bold**	Career high

=== Regular season ===
Year	Team	GP	GS	MPG	FG%	3P%	FT%	RPG	APG	SPG	BPG	PPG
1999–00	Golden State	25	0	5.5	.333	.000	.778	1.4	.2	.1	.0	2.2
Career		25	0	5.5	.333	.000	.778	1.4	.2	.1	.0	2.2
