= Washington State Cougars men's basketball statistical leaders =

The Washington State Cougars men's basketball statistical leaders are individual statistical leaders of the Washington State Cougars men's basketball program in various categories, including points, assists, blocks, rebounds, and steals. Within those areas, the lists identify single-game, single-season, and career leaders. As of the next college basketball season in 2026–27, the Cougars represent Washington State University in the NCAA Division I Pac-12 Conference.

Washington State began competing in intercollegiate basketball in 1901. However, the school's record book does not generally list records from before the 1950s, as records from before this period are often incomplete and inconsistent. Since scoring was much lower in this era, and teams played much fewer games during a typical season, it is likely that few or no players from this era would appear on these lists anyway.

The NCAA did not officially record assists as a stat until the 1983–84 season, and blocks and steals until the 1985–86 season, but Washington's record books includes players in these stats before these seasons. These lists are updated through the end of the 2020–21 season.

== Scoring ==
Career
Rk	Player	Points	Seasons
1	Isaac Fontaine	2003	1993–94 1994–95 1995–96 1996–97
2	Steve Puidokas	1894	1973–74 1974–75 1975–76 1976–77
3	Klay Thompson	1756	2008–09 2009–10 2010–11
4	Don Collins	1563	1976–77 1977–78 1978–79 1979–80
5	DaVonté Lacy	1548	2011–12 2012–13 2013–14 2014–15
6	Brock Motum	1530	2009–10 2010–11 2011–12 2012–13
7	Mark Hendrickson	1496	1992–93 1993–94 1994–95 1995–96
8	Marcus Moore	1458	2000–01 2001–02 2002–03 2003–04
9	Bennie Seltzer	1423	1989–90 1990–91 1991–92 1992–93
10	Josh Hawkinson	1414	2013–14 2014–15 2015–16 2016–17

Season
Rk	Player	Points	Season
1	Klay Thompson	733	2010–11
2	Isaac Fontaine	657	1996–97
3	Don Collins	647	1979–80
4	Brock Motum	613	2011–12
5	Klay Thompson	609	2009–10
6	Brock Motum	597	2012–13
	Vince Hanson	597	1944–45
8	C. J. Elleby	589	2019–20
9	Robert Franks	583	2018–19
10	Terrence Lewis	575	1991–92

Single game
Rk	Player	Points	Season	Opponent
1	Brian Quinnett	45	1986–87	Loyola-Marymount
2	Brian Quinnett	44	1988–89	USC
3	Guy Williams	43	1982–83	Idaho State
	Klay Thompson	43	2009–10	San Diego
	Klay Thompson	43	2010–11	Washington
6	Steve Puidokas	42	1974–75	Gonzaga
	Marcus Moore	42	2002–03	Gonzaga
8	Jay Locklier	40	2001–02	Centenary
	Noah Williams	40	2020–21	Stanford
	Ace Glass	40	2025–26	Arizona State

== Rebounds ==
Career
Rk	Player	Rebounds	Seasons
1	Josh Hawkinson	1015	2013–14 2014–15 2015–16 2016–17
2	Steve Puidokas	992	1973–74 1974–75 1975–76 1976–77
3	Mark Hendrickson	927	1992–93 1993–94 1994–95 1995–96
4	Jim McKean	844	1965–66 1966–67 1967–68
5	Ted Werner	837	1962–63 1963–64 1964–65
6	Charlie Sells	827	1959–60 1960–61 1961–62
7	John Maras	808	1957–58 1958–59 1959–60
8	Carlos Daniel	775	1994–95 1995–96 1996–97 1997–98
9	Stuart House	687	1976–77 1977–78 1978–79 1979–80
10	James Donaldson	677	1975–76 1976–77 1977–78 1978–79

Season
Rk	Player	Rebounds	Season
1	Josh Hawkinson	334	2014–15
2	Ted Werner	323	1963–64
3	Josh Hawkinson	321	2015–16
4	Josh Hawkinson	315	2016–17
5	James Donaldson	305	1977–78
6	Jim McKean	304	1966–67
7	D.J. Shelton	297	2013–14
8	Ted Werner	396	1964–65
9	Charlie Sells	286	1961–62
10	John Maras	285	1958–59

Single game
Rk	Player	Rebounds	Season	Opponent
1	Jim McKean	27	1966–67	West Virginia
2	Ted Werner	24	1964–65	UCLA
	James Donaldson	24	1978–79	Seattle Pacific
4	Charlie Sells	23	1959–60	Gonzaga
5	Bill Rehder	21	1954–55	Montana
	Charlie Sells	21	1959–60	Idaho
	Ted Werner	21	1963–64	Idaho
	Dwayne Scholten	21	1986–87	Delaware
9	Ted Werner	20	1963–64	USC
	Jim McKean	20	1966–67	Montana State
	Josh Hawkinson	20	2015–16	Washington

== Assists ==
Career
Rk	Player	Assists	Seasons
1	Bennie Seltzer	473	1989–90 1990–91 1991–92 1992–93
2	Kyle Weaver	465	2004–05 2005–06 2006–07 2007–08
3	Keith Morrison	456	1982–83 1983–84 1984–85 1985–86
4	Donminic Ellison	441	1993–94 1994–95 1995–96
5	Marcus Moore	423	2000–01 2001–02 2002–03 2003–04
6	Reggie Moore	419	2009–10 2010–11 2011–12
7	Taylor Rochestie	381	2006–07 2007–08 2008–09
8	Ike Iroegbu	375	2013–14 2014–15 2015–16 2016–17
9	Marty Giovacchini	371	1973–74 1974–75 1975–76 1976–77
10	Blake Pengelly	324	1996–97 1997–98 1998–99 1999–00

Season
Rk	Player	Assists	Season
1	Reggie Moore	193	2011–12
2	Donminic Ellison	192	1994–95
3	Taylor Rochestie	165	2007–08
4	Kyle Weaver	157	2006–07
5	Donminic Ellison	151	1995–96
	Kyle Weaver	151	2007–08
7	Taylor Rochestie	150	2008–09
8	LeJuan Watts	149	2024–25
9	Brad Jackson	145	1973–74
	Nate Calmese	145	2024–25

Single game
Rk	Player	Assists	Season	Opponent
1	Donminic Ellison	15	1994–95	Cal State Northridge

== Steals ==
Career
Rk	Player	Steals	Seasons
1	Don Collins	204	1976–77 1977–78 1978–79 1979–80
2	Keith Morrison	191	1982–83 1983–84 1984–85 1985–86
3	Kyle Weaver	188	2004–05 2005–06 2006–07 2007–08
4	Marcus Moore	168	2000–01 2001–02 2002–03 2003–04
5	Isaac Fontaine	161	1993–94 1994–95 1995–96 1996–97
6	Mike Bush	149	1998–99 1999–00 2000–01 2001–02
7	Bennie Seltzer	147	1989–90 1990–91 1991–92 1992–93
8	Derrick Low	145	2004–05 2005–06 2006–07 2007–08
9	Thomas Kelati	133	2001–02 2002–03 2003–04 2004–05
10	Klay Thompson	130	2008–09 2009–10 2010–11

Season
Rk	Player	Steals	Season
1	Don Collins	76	1979–80
2	Kyle Weaver	74	2006–07
3	Don Collins	71	1978–79
4	Bryan Rison	70	1979–80
5	Keith Morrison	60	1985–86
	Kyle Weaver	60	2007–08
7	Craig Ehlo	59	1982–83
8	Ken McFadden	57	1980–81
9	Keith Morrison	56	1984–85
	Klay Thompson	56	2010–11
	C. J. Elleby	56	2019–20
	Myles Rice	56	2023–24

Single game
Rk	Player	Steals	Season	Opponent
1	Don Collins	8	1979–80	Washington
	Mike Bush	8	1999–00	Portland State

== Blocks ==
Career
Rk	Player	Blocks	Seasons
1	James Donaldson	176	1975–76 1976–77 1977–78 1978–79
2	DeAngelo Casto	165	2008–09 2009–10 2010–11
3	Carlos Daniel	136	1994–95 1995–96 1996–97 1997–98
4	Stuart House	118	1976–77 1977–78 1978–79 1979–80
	Robbie Cowgill	118	2004–05 2005–06 2006–07 2007–08
6	Otis Jennings	116	1982–83 1983–84 1984–85 1985–86
7	Efe Abogidi	102	2020–21 2021–22
8	Rob Corkrum	94	1990–91 1991–92 1992–93 1994–95
	Josh Hawkinson	94	2013–14 2014–15 2015–16 2016–17
10	Kyle Weaver	93	2004–05 2005–06 2006–07 2007–08
	Aron Baynes	93	2005–06 2006–07 2007–08 2008–09

Season
Rk	Player	Blocks	Season
1	James Donaldson	82	1977–78
2	James Donaldson	76	1978–79
3	Stuart House	69	1979–80
4	DeAngelo Casto	67	2009–10
5	Efe Abogidi	66	2021–22
6	DeAngelo Casto	59	2010–11
7	Ivory Clark	53	2006–07
8	Valentine Izundu	50	2015–16
9	Todd Anderson	47	1987–88
10	ND Okafor	46	2025–26

Single game
Rk	Player	Blocks	Season	Opponent
1	James Donaldson	10	1977–78	Seattle U.
