= Kelvin Sampson =

American basketball coach (born 1955)

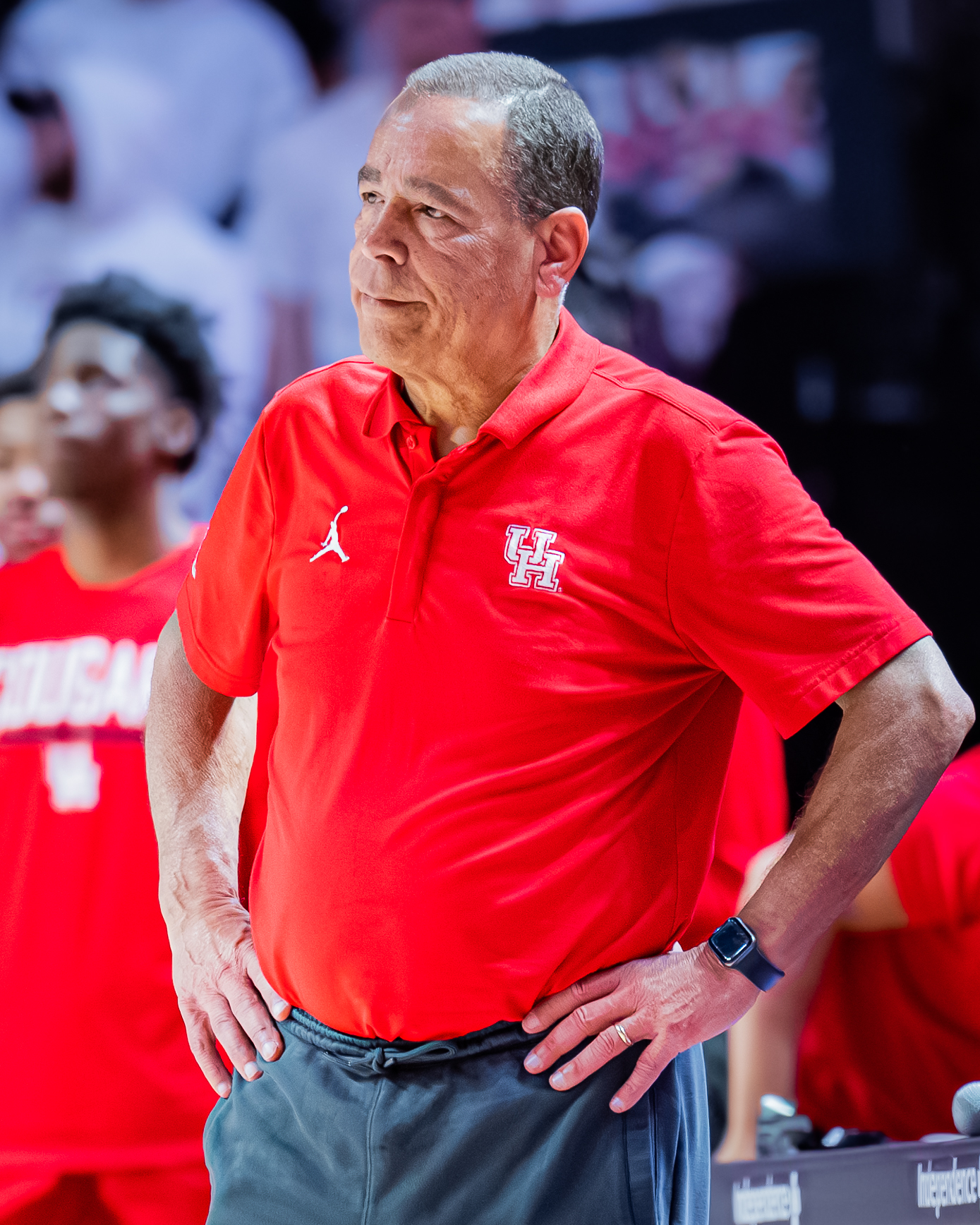
- Sampson as coach of Houston in 2023

Current position
- Title: Head coach
- Team: Houston
- Conference: Big 12
- Record: 335–91 (.786)

Biographical details
- Born: October 5, 1955 (age 71); Laurinburg, North Carolina, U.S.

Playing career
- 1973–1978: Pembroke State
- Position: Guard

Coaching career (HC unless noted)
- 1979–1980: Michigan State (GA)
- 1980–1981: Montana Tech (assistant)
- 1981–1985: Montana Tech
- 1985–1987: Washington State (assistant)
- 1987–1994: Washington State
- 1994–2006: Oklahoma
- 2006–2008: Indiana
- 2008–2011: Milwaukee Bucks (assistant)
- 2011–2014: Houston Rockets (assistant)
- 2014–present: Houston

Head coaching record
- Overall: 834–362 (.697)
- Tournaments: 33–21 (NCAA Division I); 2–4 (NIT)

Accomplishments and honors

Championships
- 3 NCAA Division I regional – Final Four (2002, 2021, 2025); 3 Frontier tournament (1983–1985); 2 Frontier regular season (1984, 1985); 4 Big 12 tournament (2001–2003, 2025); 3 Big 12 regular season (2005, 2024, 2025); 2 AAC tournament (2021, 2022); 4 AAC regular season (2019, 2020, 2022, 2023)

Awards
- 2× AP Coach of the Year (1995, 2024); 2× Henry Iba Award (1995, 2024); 2× NABC Coach of the Year (2002, 2024); Ben Jobe Award (2022); Sporting News Coach of the Year (2025); 2× Frontier Coach of the Year (1983, 1985); Pacific-10 Coach of the Year (1991); Big Eight Coach of the Year (1995); 4× AAC Coach of the Year (2018, 2019, 2022, 2023); 2× Big 12 Coach of the Year (2024, 2025)

Kelvin Dale Sampson (born October 5, 1955) is an American college basketball coach, currently the head coach for the University of Houston Cougars of the Big 12 Conference.

== Early life ==
Sampson was born in Laurinburg, North Carolina, to parents who were members of the Lumbee Native American tribe of Pembroke in Robeson County, North Carolina, in which he was reared. Sampson excelled in the classroom and the athletic arena during his prep days at Pembroke High School, in Pembroke, North Carolina. Sampson was captain of his high school basketball team for two years, and played for his father John W. "Ned" Sampson, who was later named to the UNC Pembroke Athletics Hall of Fame. His father was also one of the 500 Lumbee Native Americans who made national news by driving the Ku Klux Klan out of Maxton, North Carolina in what is annually celebrated by the Lumbee as the Battle of Hayes Pond. Later he played at Pembroke State University (now UNC Pembroke), concentrating on basketball and baseball. He earned four letters in basketball and three in baseball, and was team captain of the basketball team as a senior.

After earning degrees from Pembroke State in both health and physical education and political science, Sampson pursued his master's degree in coaching and administration at Michigan State University. He left with his degree and a year's experience as a graduate assistant under hall of fame head coach Jud Heathcote.

== Coaching career ==
=== Montana Tech ===
After a season as a graduate assistant at Michigan State, Sampson was hired in 1980 as an assistant coach at Montana Tech (of the NAIA) in Butte. During that first season, he was promoted to interim head coach of the Orediggers in January, and was soon named head coach. The coach of the year in the Frontier Conference twice (1983, 1985), he was also Tech's athletic director.

=== Washington State ===
After five years at Montana Tech, Sampson joined the staff of third-year head coach Len Stevens at Washington State University in June 1985, replacing Stu Jackson as assistant coach. Two years later in early April 1987, Stevens left the Palouse for Nevada; after a week, Sampson was promoted to head coach at age 31, with a two-year contract and a base salary of $42,500 per year. When he led the Cougars to the NIT in 1992, it was Washington State's first postseason appearance in nine years. Sampson was named Kodak District 14 Coach of the Year by the NABC for the second time in three years; he first won it in 1991 when the Cougars produced their first winning season since 1983. Sampson was also named Pac-10 Coach of the Year in 1992.

In his final year in Pullman in 1994, he led WSU to their first NCAA tournament berth in eleven years. With records of 22–11 in 1992 and 20–11 in 1994, Sampson became one of only four men to win twenty or more games in a single season in Washington State history; he finished with a 103–103 record in his seven seasons as head coach.

=== Oklahoma ===
Sampson became the 11th head coach at the University of Oklahoma on April 25, 1994. Sampson was named national coach of the year in 1995 (his first year at OU) by the Associated Press, United States Basketball Writers Association and Basketball Weekly after guiding the Sooners to 23–9 overall and 15–0 home marks. It was the second-best overall record posted by a first-year coach in Big 8 history.

The University of Oklahoma is where Sampson earned his nickname "Mr. Blue Shirt" as he only wore blue dress shirts when he coached.

=== Indiana ===
On March 29, 2006, Sampson was named the head coach at Indiana University following the resignation of Mike Davis. Sampson was the second minority coach in the history of the Hoosier basketball program behind Davis. Upon taking the reins of the Indiana Hoosiers he noted, "I love my job at Oklahoma and I would not leave OU for any job unless it was a job like Indiana. My family and I have had 12 great years at Oklahoma, the best years of our life, but Indiana is one of the great programs in college basketball and if they call and offer, it is a job as a coach that you have to take."

On February 22, 2008, Sampson was forced to resign due to allegations of serious NCAA violations, which included sending text messages to recruits, something that was against NCAA rules between 2007 and 2013. As a result of these allegations, Sampson received a five-year show-cause penalty. See NCAA violations section below.

=== NBA ===
On March 8, 2008, Sampson was hired in an advisory role by the San Antonio Spurs, before accepting a role on May 14, 2008, as assistant coach of the Bucks under Scott Skiles. In 2011, he became an assistant coach with the Houston Rockets before returning to the NCAA in 2014.

=== Houston Cougars ===
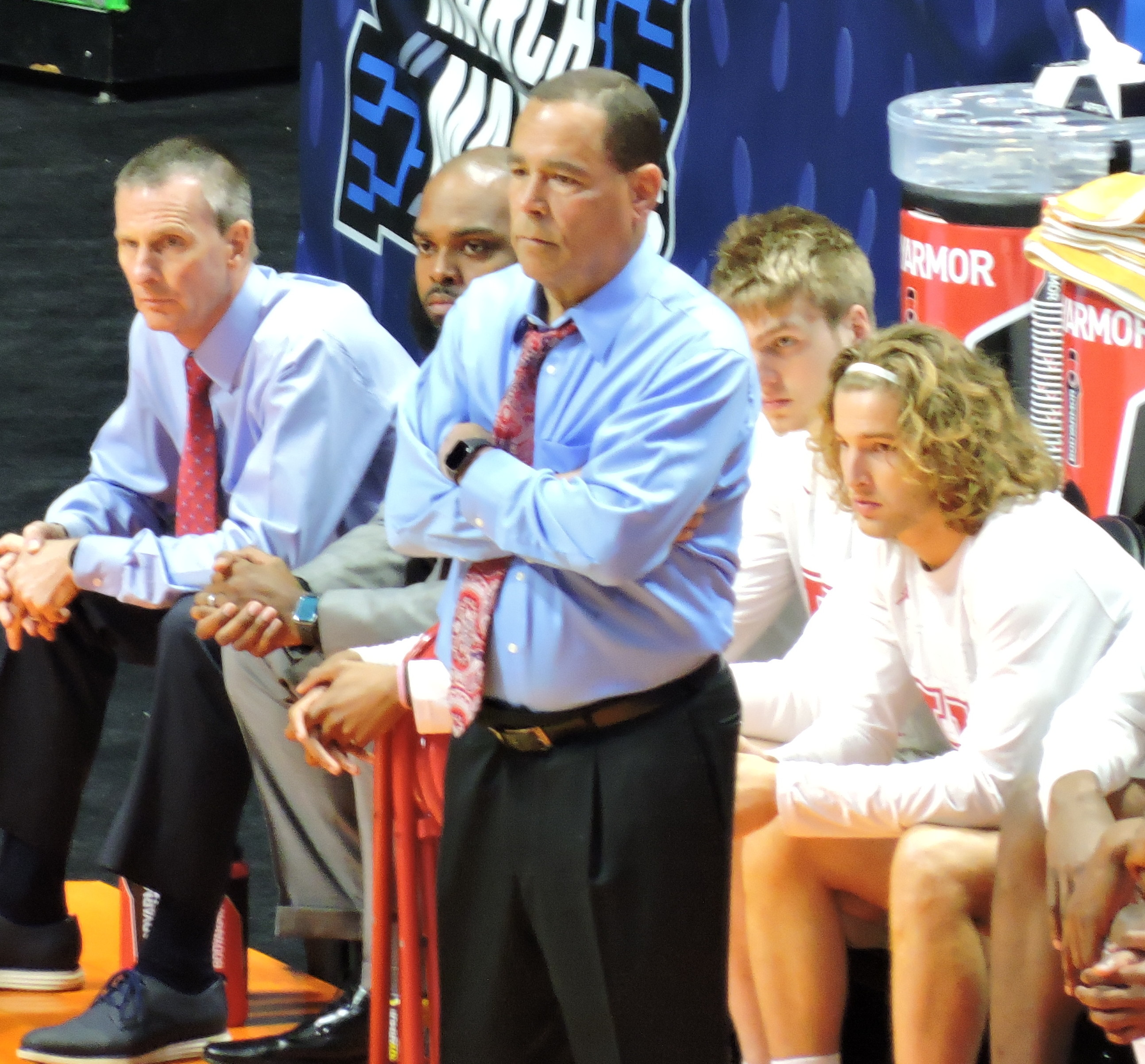
Sampson coaching Houston in 2019

Following the expiration of the five-year show cause penalty, the Houston Cougars hired Sampson to coach the men's basketball team on April 2, 2014. Sampson was instrumental in Houston's push to raise funds to build a $25 million practice facility in 2016 and a $60 million renovation to Hofheinz Pavilion (renamed the Fertitta Center) in 2018. Sampson led Houston to the NIT in his second and third seasons. In 2018, Houston posted its first Top 25 finish since 1984 and won its first NCAA tournament game also since 1984. In 2019, the Cougars won a school-record 33 games, only the fourth 30-win season in school history. They also advanced to the Sweet Sixteen, their deepest run in the tournament since advancing all the way to the national championship game in 1983 and 1984.

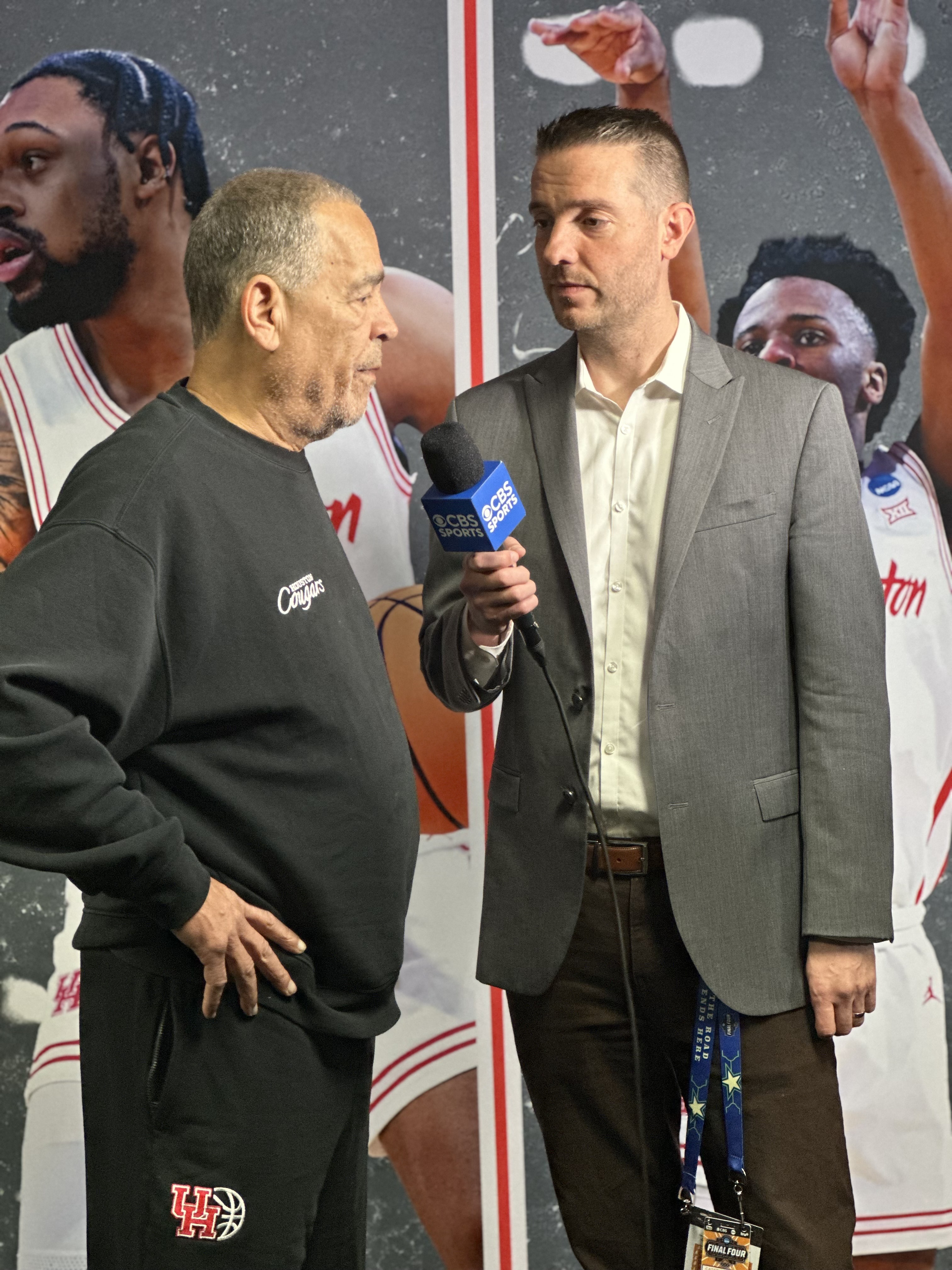
Sampson being interviewed by CBS Sports prior to Houston's 2025 Final Four win against Duke at the Alamodome.

In 2021, Sampson led Houston to its first conference tournament crown since 2010. In the NCAA Tournament the Cougars, who became the first team to play four schools seeded tenth or higher, defeated Oregon State to advance to the Final Four for the first time since 1984. Sampson became the fifteenth coach to have reached a Final Four again after a gap of over ten years, having last reached the Final Four in 2002 (only Ray Meyer, Lon Kruger, and Lou Henson had a longer gap between Final Four appearances). In 2022, Sampson's Cougars overcame season-ending injuries to two key players to win both the regular-season American Athletic Conference crown and the conference tournament and proceeded to advance to the Elite Eight in the NCAA Tournament. They finished with a record of 32–6 and a ranking of #7 in the Coaches Poll, and Sampson was voted AAC Coach of the Year for the third time.

In 2025, Sampson's Cougars were a #1 seed entering the NCAA tournament. After reaching the Final Four, the Cougars pulled a stunning upset of heavily favored Duke. Down 45–59 with eight minutes left, the Cougars ended the game with a 25–8 run, defeating Duke by a score of 70–67, and setting up a clash against Florida for the championship. They went on to lose to Florida, 63–65.

Sampson is currently the second-winningest coach in UH history, behind only Hall of Famer Guy Lewis.

== NCAA violations ==
Sampson played a role in the controversial recruitment of star player Eric Gordon, who signed with Indiana after reneging on an early verbal commitment to the University of Illinois. Sampson was criticized by fellow coaches for failing to communicate with then-Illinois coach Bruce Weber about the recruitment, and hiring people close to Gordon to gain favor. Some observers said that Sampson's recruitment of the verbally committed Gordon was unethical, but legal.

In addition to the Gordon incident, Sampson has been in the middle of a number of other controversies. Under Sampson's watch, Oklahoma was placed under a three-year investigation by the NCAA for recruiting violations. At the end of their investigation, the NCAA issued a report citing more than 550 impermissible calls made by Sampson and his staff to 17 different recruits. The NCAA barred Sampson from recruiting off campus and making phone calls for one year, ending May 24, 2007.

Prior to the findings by the NCAA, Kelvin Sampson was the President of the National Association of Basketball Coaches (NABC), an organization that supports basketball coaches across the country. During his tenure the Ethics Committee of the NABC was formed to address the many problems with violations that college basketball faced going into the 2003 season. That very same Ethics Committee would later reprimand Kelvin Sampson as a result of the NCAA findings, placing him on probation for three years, during which time he would not be eligible to serve in any official capacity for the NABC, be considered for Coach of the Year honors, or receive Final Four ticket privileges.

As coach at Indiana in October 2007, Sampson again came under scrutiny for making impermissible phone calls. Despite being restricted from making any outbound recruiting phone calls, Sampson participated in approximately 10 conference calls with recruits that violate the terms of the sanctions levied against him by the NCAA. IU assistant Rob Senderoff (who later resigned) also made some 35 impermissible phone calls to recruits from his home. On February 8, 2008, the NCAA informed Indiana that Sampson had committed five "major" rules violations. The NCAA alleged that Sampson knowingly violated telephone recruiting restrictions imposed on him. More seriously, the NCAA also alleged that Sampson lied to IU and NCAA officials regarding his involvement in the impermissible calls.

Indiana launched an internal investigation that school president Michael McRobbie said would take seven days. On February 14, 2008, ESPN reported that Sampson's status as coach of the Hoosiers would be decided on a "game-by-game basis". Fox Sports reported that Sampson was to be fired on February 22, 2008, but later reports indicated that Sampson would be suspended without pay. Eventually it was announced that Sampson would resign, reaching a $750,000 settlement with Indiana. In return, Sampson agreed not to sue Indiana for wrongful termination. Assistant Dan Dakich was named as interim head coach for the rest of the season.

According to many college basketball pundits, however, Sampson had virtually no chance of keeping his job once the allegations broke. Sports Illustrated college basketball columnist Seth Davis implied that Indiana officials had already decided Sampson was guilty, based on the fact that its internal investigation would only last a week. The NCAA had given Indiana 90 days to respond to the notice. ESPN's Mark Schlabach suggested that Indiana wanted to look for a reason not to pay the remaining money he was owed on his contract, and also wanted to eliminate any chance of being sued. He also said that the only reason Sampson was allowed to continue coaching was because his contract didn't allow the school to suspend him immediately. ESPN's Pat Forde said that Sampson's departure was "preordained" the moment the NCAA sent out its notice of allegations, and suggested that Sampson might never coach in Division I again.

During a private meeting with the NCAA infractions committee on June 30, McRobbie apologized for hiring Sampson and called that decision a mistake. McRobbie said that Sampson betrayed his trust as Indiana's coach, and demonstrated that his hiring had been "a risk that should not have been taken."

On November 25, 2008, the NCAA issued Indiana three years' probation for violations largely tied to Sampson's watch. It also imposed a five-year show-cause order on Sampson, meaning that any NCAA member school who wanted to hire Sampson while the order was in effect would have to impose sanctions on him unless it can "show cause" that Sampson has served his punishment. As most NCAA members will not consider hiring a coach with an outstanding show-cause order, the show-cause effectively prevented Sampson from coaching at the major-college level until 2013. A similar incident happened to Todd Bozeman, who was slapped with an eight-year show-cause order in 1996 and was unable to find work in the college ranks again until 2006. Senderoff, now head coach at Kent State, was hit with a three-year show-cause order. When he was hired at Houston, Sampson became only the fourth coach to get a head coaching job at another school after receiving a show-cause (after Bozeman, Senderoff and Bruce Pearl). Most athletic directors, presidents, and chancellors are reluctant to hire a coach who has been hit with a show-cause.

In December 2008, Eric Gordon raised issues of drug use on the Indiana team, stating that some players were abusing drugs and that this led to the disintegration of the team, and that Sampson tried to stop it, but did not as he was focused on winning.

== International basketball ==
Sampson coached the 2004 Under-21 USA national team to a gold medal in Under-21 Tournament of the Americas in Halifax, Nova Scotia, after it posted a 5–0 record. He was an assistant coach under George Karl for the US national team in the 2002 FIBA World Championship. Sampson was also the head coach of the United States Junior National Team that participated in the Junior World Games in Athens, Greece, in the summer of 1995.

In the summer of 1994, Sampson was selected to coach at the Goodwill Games in St. Petersburg, Russia. He served as an assistant to former Southern California head coach George Raveling. The team earned a bronze medal and competed against USA Basketball's Dream Team II following the games. In 1993, Sampson was selected head coach of the West team at the U.S. Olympic Festival in San Antonio, Texas. His squad won the silver medal.

In the summer of 2012, Sampson was assistant coach of the Canadian national team. Steve Nash was the team's general manager and Jay Triano, the head coach.

== Personal life ==
Sampson is married to Karen Lowry. They have one daughter, Lauren, and one son, Kellen. Lauren is the Men's Basketball Director of External Operations at the University of Houston, and Kellen is an assistant coach, also at Houston.

== Head coaching record ==
Record table
Season	Team	Overall	Conference	Standing	Postseason
Montana Tech Orediggers (Frontier Conference) (1981–1985)
1981–82	Montana Tech	7–20	0–15	6th	
1982–83	Montana Tech	22–9	10–5	3rd	
1983–84	Montana Tech	22–7	11–4	T–1st	
1984–85	Montana Tech	22–9	12–3	1st	
Montana Tech:		73–45 (.619)	33–27 (.550)		
Washington State Cougars (Pacific-10 Conference) (1987–1994)
1987–88	Washington State	13–16	7–11	6th	
1988–89	Washington State	10–19	4–14	8th	
1989–90	Washington State	7–22	1–17	10th	
1990–91	Washington State	16–12	8–10	T–5th	
1991–92	Washington State	22–11	9–9	T–5th	NIT Second Round
1992–93	Washington State	15–12	9–9	T–5th	
1993–94	Washington State	20–11	10–8	4th	NCAA Division I Round of 64
Washington State:		103–103 (.500)	48–78 (.381)		
Oklahoma Sooners (Big Eight Conference) (1994–1996)
1994–95	Oklahoma	23–9	9–5	3rd	NCAA Division I Round of 64
1995–96	Oklahoma	18–12	8–6	3rd	NCAA Division I Round of 64
Oklahoma Sooners (Big 12 Conference) (1996–2006)
1996–97	Oklahoma	19–11	9–7	6th	NCAA Division I Round of 64
1997–98	Oklahoma	22–11	11–5	T–2nd	NCAA Division I Round of 64
1998–99	Oklahoma	22–11	11–5	T–2nd	NCAA Division I Sweet 16
1999–2000	Oklahoma	27–7	12–4	T–3rd	NCAA Division I Round of 32
2000–01	Oklahoma	26–7	12–4	T–2nd	NCAA Division I Round of 64
2001–02	Oklahoma	31–5	13–3	2nd	NCAA Division I Final Four
2002–03	Oklahoma	27–7	12–4	3rd	NCAA Division I Elite Eight
2003–04	Oklahoma	20–11	8–8	7th	NIT Second Round
2004–05	Oklahoma	25–8	12–4	T–1st	NCAA Division I Round of 32
2005–06	Oklahoma	20–9	11–5	3rd	NCAA Division I Round of 64
Oklahoma:		280–108 (.722)	128–60 (.681)		
Indiana Hoosiers (Big Ten Conference) (2006–2008)
2006–07	Indiana	21–11	10–6	3rd	NCAA Division I Round of 32
2007–08	Indiana	22–4	11–2	–	
Indiana:		43–15 (.741)	21–8 (.724)		
Houston Cougars (American Athletic Conference) (2014–2023)
2014–15	Houston	13–19	4–14	10th	
2015–16	Houston	22–10	12–6	T–3rd	NIT First Round
2016–17	Houston	21–11	12–6	3rd	NIT First Round
2017–18	Houston	27–8	14–4	T–2nd	NCAA Division I Round of 32
2018–19	Houston	33–4	16–2	1st	NCAA Division I Sweet 16
2019–20	Houston	23–8	13–5	T–1st	No postseason held
2020–21	Houston	28–4	14–3	2nd	NCAA Division I Final Four
2021–22	Houston	32–6	15–3	1st	NCAA Division I Elite Eight
2022–23	Houston	33–4	17–1	1st	NCAA Division I Sweet 16
Houston Cougars (Big 12 Conference) (2023–present)
2023–24	Houston	32–5	15–3	1st	NCAA Division I Sweet 16
2024–25	Houston	35–5	19–1	1st	NCAA Division I Runner-up
2025–26	Houston	30–7	14–4	2nd	NCAA Division I Sweet 16
2026–27	Houston	6–0	0–0		
Houston:		335–91 (.786)	165–52 (.760)		
Total:		834–362 (.697)			
National champion Postseason invitational champion Conference regular season champion Conference regular season and conference tournament champion Division regular season champion Division regular season and conference tournament champion Conference tournament champion

- Sampson resigned on February 22, 2008, and was replaced by assistant Dan Dakich for the remainder of the season. Indiana credits the last seven games of the season to Dakich.
- In some sources, Sampson's 1996–97 record with Oklahoma is given as 20–10 overall, 10–6 in Big 12 conference games, based on the fact that Texas Tech, which was 1–1 versus Oklahoma in Big 12 play that season, would later have all its 1996–97 conference wins vacated due to participation by ineligible personnel.

== See also ==
- List of college men's basketball career coaching wins leaders
- List of NCAA Division I men's basketball tournament Final Four appearances by coach
