= Dick DiBiaso =

American basketball player and coach

Biographical details
- Born: February 6, 1941
- Died: October 19, 2017 (aged 76); Auburn, California, U.S.

Playing career
- 1958–1962: Mansfield State
- Position(s): Point guard

Coaching career (HC unless noted)
- 1964–1968: Beacon HS
- 1968–1971: Virginia (assistant)
- 1971–1975: Notre Dame (assistant)
- 1975–1982: Stanford

Head coaching record
- Overall: 70–118

Accomplishments and honors

Awards
- Pac-8 Co-Coach of the Year (1976)

Richard J. DiBiaso (February 6, 1941 – October 19, 2017) was an American college basketball coach for Stanford University.

From Monessen, Pennsylvania, DiBiaso played college basketball for coach Bill Gibson at Mansfield State (now Mansfield University of Pennsylvania). Years later, DiBiaso got his college coaching break from Beacon High School in Beacon, New York, when Gibson hired him as an assistant at Virginia. In 1971, Digger Phelps added DiBiaso to his first staff at Notre Dame, where he stayed until 1975.

in 1975, DiBiaso was named head coach at Stanford. In his first season, DiBiaso took a team that returned one starter and experienced significant injuries to a 9–18 record. Eleven of the losses were by six points are fewer. His efforts were recognized at the end of the season when he was named Pac-8 Conference co-coach of the year with George Raveling. DiBiaso would stay for several more seasons and was given a two-year contract in February 1981. However, he announced he was resigning at the end of the 1981–82 season in February 1982.

DiBiaso died on October 19, 2017, in Auburn, California.

== Head coaching record ==
Statistics overview
Season	Team	Overall	Conference	Standing	Postseason
Stanford Cardinal (Pac-8 Conference/Pac-10 Conference) (1975–1982)
1975–76	Stanford	11–16	3–11	7th	
1976–77	Stanford	11–16	3–11	7th	
1977–78	Stanford	13–14	3–11	8th	
1978–79	Stanford	12–15	6–12	8th–T	
1979–80	Stanford	7–19	5–13	7th–T	
1980–81	Stanford	9–18	5–13	8th–T	
1981–82	Stanford	7–20	2–16	10th	
Stanford:		68–120 (.362)	27–87 (.237)		
Total:		68–120 (.362)			
National champion Postseason invitational champion Conference regular season champion Conference regular season and conference tournament champion Division regular season champion Division regular season and conference tournament champion Conference tournament champion
