= 1977–78 Washington Huskies men's basketball team =

American college basketball season

1977–78 Washington Huskies men's basketball
- Conference: Pacific-8 Conference
- Record: 14–13 (6–8 Pac-8)
- Head coach: Marv Harshman (7th season)
- Assistant coach: Bob Johnson
- Home arena: Hec Edmundson Pavilion

1977–78 Pacific-8 Conference men's basketball standings
	Conf.				Overall
Team	W		L	PCT	W		L	PCT
No. 2 UCLA	14	–	0	1.000	25	–	3	.893
Oregon State	9	–	5	.643	16	–	11	.593
Washington State	7	–	7	.500	16	–	11	.593
USC	7	–	7	.500	14	–	13	.519
Oregon	6	–	8	.429	16	–	11	.593
Washington	6	–	8	.429	14	–	13	.519
California	4	–	10	.286	11	–	16	.407
Stanford	3	–	11	.214	13	–	14	.481
Rankings from AP Poll

The 1977–78 Washington Huskies men's basketball team represented the University of Washington for the 1977–78 NCAA Division I men's basketball season. Led by seventh-year head coach Marv Harshman, the Huskies were members of the Pacific-8 Conference and played their home games on campus at Hec Edmundson Pavilion in Seattle, Washington.

The Huskies were 14–13 overall in the regular season and 6–8 in conference play, tied for fifth in the standings.

== Roster ==
1977–78 Washington Huskies men's basketball team
Players
Coaches

Pos.	#	Name	Height	Weight	Year	Previous school	Hometown
G	14	Mike Neill	6 ft 3 in (1.91 m)	—	Jr
F	21	Mark Scott	6 ft 6 in (1.98 m)	—	Sr
G	22	Bart Hess	6 ft 0 in (1.83 m)	—	Sr
	30	Bill Lewis	—	—
F	31	Andra Griffin	6 ft 7 in (2.01 m)	—	Fr
F	32	Stan Walker	6 ft 5 in (1.96 m)	—	So
C	33	James Woods	6 ft 8 in (2.03 m)	—	So
G	34	Bob Fronk	6 ft 4 in (1.93 m)	—	Fr
F	43	Kim Stewart	6 ft 7 in (2.01 m)	—	Sr
F		Steve Matzen	6 ft 4 in (1.93 m)	—	So
G		Don Vaughn	5 ft 11 in (1.8 m)	—	Fr
C		Pétur Guðmundsson	7 ft 2 in (2.18 m)	260 lb (118 kg)	Fr	Mercer Island

Head coach

- Marv Harshman (Pacific Lutheran)

Assistant coach(es)

- Bob Johnson (Washington)

Legend

- (C) Team captain
- (S) Suspended
- (I) Ineligible
- (W) Walk-on
- Injured
- Current redshirt

Roster

== Schedule and results ==
Date time, TV	Rank^{#}	Opponent^{#}	Result	Record	Site (attendance) city, state
Exhibition
Nov 22, 1977		Australian Nationals	W 88–55	–	Hec Edmundson Pavilion; Seattle, WA
Regular season
Nov 28, 1977*		Arizona State	W 68–62	1–0	Hec Edmundson Pavilion; Seattle, WA
Dec 2, 1977*		Seattle Pacific	W 78–70	2–0	Hec Edmundson Pavilion; Seattle, WA
Dec 7, 1977*		Wyoming	W 69–64	3–0	Hec Edmundson Pavilion; Seattle, WA
Dec 10, 1977*		at Seattle	W 85–58	4–0	Seattle Center Coliseum; Seattle, WA
Dec 15, 1977*		at Colorado	W 81–70	5–0	Balch Fieldhouse; Boulder, CO
Dec 17, 1977*		at Utah State	L 85–91	5–1	Smith Spectrum; Logan, UT
Dec 19, 1977*		at Santa Clara	L 75–82	5–2	Toso Pavilion; Santa Clara, CA
Dec 23, 1977*		Wake Forest	L 70–77	5–3	Hec Edmundson Pavilion; Seattle, WA
Dec 27, 1977*		vs. Villanova; Far West Classic	L 73–78	5–4	Veterans Memorial Coliseum; Portland, OR
Dec 29, 1977*		vs. Rice; Far West Classic	W 70–57	6–4	Veterans Memorial Coliseum; Portland, OR
Dec 30, 1977*		vs. Illinois; Far West Classic	W 81–68	7–4	Veterans Memorial Coliseum (6,542); Portland, OR
Jan 6, 1978		No. 7 UCLA	L 60–79	7–5 (0–1)	Hec Edmundson Pavilion (7,461); Seattle, WA
Jan 7, 1978		USC	L 73–81	7–6 (0–2)	Hec Edmundson Pavilion; Seattle, WA
Jan 12, 1978		at California	W 85–77	8–6 (1–2)	Harmon Gym; Berkeley, CA
Jan 14, 1978		at Stanford	L 68–72	8–7 (1–3)	Maples Pavilion; Stanford, CA
Jan 18, 1978*		at Seattle	W 69–60	9–7	Hec Edmundson Pavilion; Seattle, WA
Jan 21, 1978*		No. 2 Marquette	L 63–71	9–8	MECCA Arena (10,938); Milwaukee, WI
Jan 28, 1978		Washington State	W 68–52	10–8 (2–3)	Hec Edmundson Pavilion; Seattle, WA
Feb 2, 1978		Oregon	W 58–52	11–8 (3–3)	Hec Edmundson Pavilion; Seattle, WA
Feb 4, 1978		Oregon State	W 64–61	12–8 (4–3)	Hec Edmundson Pavilion; Seattle, WA
Feb 9, 1978		at Oregon State	L 60–64	12–9 (4–4)	Gill Coliseum; Corvallis, OR
Feb 11, 1978		at Oregon	L 60–64	12–10 (4–5)	McArthur Court; Eugene, OR
Feb 17, 1978		at USC	W 84–79	13–10 (5–5)	Los Angeles Memorial Sports Arena; Los Angeles, CA
Feb 18, 1978		at No. 4 UCLA	L 64–104	13–11 (5–6)	Pauley Pavilion (12,593); Los Angeles, CA
Feb 23, 1978		Stanford	L 74–81	13–12 (5–7)	Hec Edmundson Pavilion; Seattle, WA
Feb 26, 1978		California	W 83–76	14–12 (6–7)	Hec Edmundson Pavilion; Seattle, WA
Mar 4, 1978		at Washington State	L 52–57	14–13 (6–8)	Washington State University Performing Arts Coliseum; Pullman, WA
*Non-conference game. ^{#}Rankings from AP poll. (#) Tournament seedings in parentheses. All times are in Pacific Time.
