= 1976–77 Oregon Webfoots men's basketball team =

American college basketball season

1976–77 Oregon Webfoots men's basketball

NIT, Quarterfinals
- Conference: Pacific-8 Conference
- Record: 19–10 (9–5 Pac-8)
- Head coach: Dick Harter
- MVP: Greg Ballard
- Home arena: McArthur Court

1976–77 Pacific-8 Conference men's basketball standings
| | Conf. | | | | Overall |
| Team | W | | L | PCT | W | | L | PCT |
|---|---|---|---|---|---|---|---|---|
| No. 2 UCLA | 11 | – | 3 | .786 | 24 | – | 5 | .828 |
| Oregon | 9 | – | 5 | .643 | 19 | – | 10 | .655 |
| Washington State | 8 | – | 6 | .571 | 19 | – | 8 | .704 |
| Washington | 8 | – | 6 | .571 | 17 | – | 10 | .630 |
| Oregon State | 8 | – | 6 | .571 | 16 | – | 13 | .552 |
| California | 7 | – | 7 | .500 | 12 | – | 15 | .444 |
| Stanford | 3 | – | 11 | .214 | 11 | – | 16 | .407 |
| USC | 2 | – | 12 | .143 | 6 | – | 20 | .231 |
As of April 15, 1977; Rankings from AP Poll

The 1976–77 Oregon Webfoots men's basketball team represented the University of Oregon during the 1976–77 NCAA men's college basketball season.

== Schedule ==
| Date time, TV | Rank^{#} | Opponent^{#} | Result | Record | Site city, state |
|---|---|---|---|---|---|
| December 1* | | at No. 6 UNLV | L 67–78 | | Las Vegas Convention Center (6,257); Las Vegas, NV |
| December 3* | | vs. Wichita State; Sun Devil Classic | W 57–49 | | Tempe, AZ |
| December 4* | | at Arizona State; Sun Devil Classic | W 78–51 | | Tempe, AZ |
| December 9* | | San Francisco State | W 78–51 | | McArthur Court; Eugene, OR |
| December 14* | | Cal-State Fullerton | W 61–51 | | McArthur Court; Eugene, OR |
| December 18* | | Cal-State Los Angeles | W 87–56 | | McArthur Court; Eugene, OR |
| December 22* | | Pepperdine | W 67–55 | | McArthur Court; Eugene, OR |
| December 23* | | Grambling State | W 42–38 | | McArthur Court; Eugene, OR |
| December 27* | | vs. Bowling Green; Far West Classic | W 66–54 | | Veterans Memorial Coliseum; Portland, OR |
| December 28* | | vs. No. 9 North Carolina; Far West Classic | L 60–86 | | Veterans Memorial Coliseum; Portland, OR |
| December 29* | | vs. Saint Louis; Far West Classic | W 59–55 | | Veterans Memorial Coliseum; Portland, OR |
| January 7 | | at No. 7 UCLA | W 61–60 | | Pauley Pavilion (12,497); Los Angeles, CA |
| January 8 | | at USC | W 64–52 | | Los Angeles Memorial Sports Arena; Los Angeles, CA |
| January 13 | No. 20 | Washington | W 72–68 ^{OT} | | McArthur Court; Eugene, OR |
| January 15 | No. 20 | Washington State | L 45–49 | | McArthur Court; Eugene, OR |
| January 22 | | at Oregon State; Civil War | L 52–53 | | Gill Coliseum; Corvallis, OR |
| January 26 | | Oregon State | L 53–64 | | Portland, OR |
| January 29* | | at St. John's | L 51–61 | | Alumni Hall; Queens, NY |
| February 4 | | Stanford | W 73–48 | | McArthur Court; Eugene, OR |
| February 5 | | California | W 75–49 | | McArthur Court; Eugene, OR |
| February 10 | | at California | L 102–107 ^{5OT} | | Harmon Gym; Berkeley, CA |
| February 12 | | at Stanford | W 74–65 | | Maples Pavilion; Stanford, CA |
| February 17 | | USC | W 60–57 | | McArthur Court; Eugene, OR |
| February 19 | | No. 3 UCLA | W 64–55 | | McArthur Court (10,500); Eugene, OR |
| February 24 | No. 17 | at Washington State | L 53–55 | | WSU Performing Arts Coliseum; Pullman, WA |
| February 26 | No. 17 | at Washington | W 61–60 | | Hec Edmundson Pavilion; Seattle, WA |
| March 3 | | Oregon State | L 73–78 ^{OT} | | McArthur Court; Eugene, OR |
| March 9* | | vs. Oral Roberts; NIT | W 90–89 | | Tulsa, OK |
| March 15* | | vs. St. Bonaventure; NIT | L 73–76 | | New York, NY |
*Non-conference game. ^{#}Rankings from AP Poll. (#) Tournament seedings in parentheses.

- 400th win at McArthur Court versus San Francisco State

== Personnel ==
- Greg Ballard
- Rob Closs
- Mike Drummond
- Ernie Kent
- Kelvin Small
