= 1975–76 Stanford Cardinal men's basketball team =

American college basketball season

1975–76 Stanford Cardinal men's basketball
- Conference: Pac 8 Conference
- Record: 9–18 (3-11 Pac 8)
- Head coach: Dick DiBiaso (1st season)
- Assistant coaches: Tom McLaughlin (1st season); Bob Frederick (1st season)
- Home arena: Maples Pavilion

1975–76 Pacific-8 Conference men's basketball standings
	Conf.				Overall
Team	W		L	PCT	W		L	PCT
No. 5 UCLA	12	–	2	.857	27	–	5	.844
Oregon State	10	–	4	.714	18	–	9	.667
Oregon	10	–	4	.714	19	–	11	.633
Washington	9	–	5	.643	22	–	6	.786
Washington State	8	–	6	.571	18	–	8	.692
California	4	–	10	.286	12	–	14	.462
Stanford	3	–	11	.214	9	–	18	.333
USC	0	–	14	.000	11	–	16	.407
Rankings from AP Poll

The 1975–76 Stanford Cardinal men's basketball team represented Stanford University as a member of the Pacific-8 Conference during the 1975–76 NCAA Division I men's basketball season.

== Roster ==
1975–76 Stanford Cardinal men's basketball team
Players
Coaches

Pos.	#	Name	Height	Weight	Year	Hometown
G	14	Ben Bluitt	6 ft 1 in (1.85 m)	165 lb (75 kg)	Sr	Detroit, Michigan
G	23	Mike Bratz	6 ft 2 in (1.88 m)	180 lb (82 kg)	Jr	Lompoc, California
G	33	Jay Carter	6 ft 4 in (1.93 m)	185 lb (84 kg)	So	Dayton, Ohio
F	42	Dick Dohrmann	6 ft 8 in (2.03 m)	198 lb (90 kg)	So	Atherton, California
F	45	Mark Fitzner	6 ft 7 in (2.01 m)	205 lb (93 kg)	So	San Diego, California
G	25	Paul Giovacchini	6 ft 1 in (1.85 m)	165 lb (75 kg)	Fr	Salt Lake City, Utah
G	41	Eddy Harris	6 ft 3 in (1.91 m)	180 lb (82 kg)	So	Kirkwood, Missouri
	13	John Mancasola	—	—
C	54	Jeff McHugh	6 ft 8 in (2.03 m)	215 lb (98 kg)	So	Long Beach, California
		Andy Paterson	—	—
C	55	Tim Patterson	6 ft 11 in (2.11 m)	235 lb (107 kg)	Sr	Santa Maria, California
G	21	Wolfe Perry	6 ft 2 in (1.88 m)	178 lb (81 kg)	Fr	Oakland, California
F	43	Scott Russell	6 ft 8 in (2.03 m)	185 lb (84 kg)	Jr	Campbell, California
F	22	George Schader	6 ft 7 in (2.01 m)	215 lb (98 kg)	Jr	Covina, California
F	44	Ed Schweitzer	6 ft 8 in (2.03 m)	210 lb (95 kg)	Sr	Newbury Park, California
G	15	Mike Simons	6 ft 4 in (1.93 m)	185 lb (84 kg)	Sr	McLean, Virginia

Head coach

- Dick DiBiaso

Assistant coach(es)

Legend

- (C) Team captain
- (S) Suspended
- (I) Ineligible
- (W) Walk-on
- Injured
- Current redshirt

== Schedule ==
Date time, TV	Rank^{#}	Opponent^{#}	Result	Record	Site city, state
November 29*		Nevada	W 94–70	1–0	Maples Pavilion; Stanford, California
December 1*		at Santa Clara	L 67–70	1–1	Leavey Center; Santa Clara, California
December 5*		San Francisco	L 44–49	1–2	Maples Pavilion; Stanford, California
December 8*		Montana State	W 95–76	2–2	Maples Pavilion; Stanford, California
December 20*		Cal Poly Pomona	W 63–61	3–2	Maples Pavilion; Stanford, California
December 22*		Minnesota	L 84–89	3–3	Maples Pavilion; Stanford, California
December 23*		Saint Mary's	W 87–71	4–3	Maples Pavilion; Stanford, California
December 27*		at LSU	L 85–89	4–4	LSU Assembly Center; Baton Rouge, Louisiana
December 29*		vs. Wisconsin	L 64–70	4–5	MECCA Arena; Milwaukee, Wisconsin
December 30*		vs. Miami (OH)	L 72–90	4–6	MECCA Arena; Milwaukee, Wisconsin
January 9		Washington State	L 60–62	4–7 (0–1)	Maples Pavilion; Stanford, California
January 10		Washington	L 81–87	4–8 (0–2)	Maples Pavilion; Stanford, California
January 16		at UCLA	L 67–68	4–9 (0–3)	Pauley Pavilion; Los Angeles, California
January 17		at USC	W 86–75	5–9 (1–3)	Los Angeles Memorial Sports Arena; Los Angeles, California
January 21*		UC-Davis	W 91–76	6–9 (1–3)	Maples Pavilion; Stanford, California
January 24		California	L 85–89 ^{2OT}	6–10 (1–4)	Maples Pavilion; Stanford, California
January 30*		at Hawaii	L 53–70	6–11 (1–4)	Neal S. Blaisdell Center; Honolulu, Hawaii
January 31*		at Hawaii	W 66–65	7–11 (1–4)	Neal S. Blaisdell Center; Honolulu, Hawaii
February 5		at Oregon	L 59–72	7–12 (1–5)	McArthur Court; Eugene, Oregon
February 7		at Oregon State	W 82–76	8–12 (2–5)	Gill Coliseum; Corvallis, Oregon
February 13		Oregon State	W 70–66	9–12 (3–5)	Maples Pavilion; Stanford, California
February 14		Oregon	L 62–84	9–13 (3–6)	Maples Pavilion; Stanford, California
February 19		at Washington	L 59–80	9–14 (3–7)	Hec Edmundson Pavilion; Seattle, Washington
February 21		at Washington State	L 79–91	9–15 (3–8)	Beasley Coliseum; Pullman, Washington
February 27		USC	W 96–83	10–15 (4–8)	Maples Pavilion; Stanford, California
February 28		UCLA	L 74–120	10–16 (4–9)	Maples Pavilion; Stanford, California
March 5		at California	W 73–65	11–16 (5–9)	Harmon Gym; Berkeley, California
*Non-conference game. ^{#}Rankings from AP Poll. (#) Tournament seedings in parentheses.
