= 1975–76 UCLA Bruins men's basketball team =

American college basketball season

1975–76 UCLA Bruins men's basketball

Pac-8 champions

NCAA tournament, Final Four
- Conference: Pacific-8

Ranking
- Coaches: No. 5
- AP: No. 5
- Record: 28–4 (13–1, 1st Pac-8)
- Head coach: Gene Bartow (1st year)
- Assistant coaches: Larry Farmer; Lee Hunt
- Home arena: Pauley Pavilion

1975–76 Pacific-8 Conference men's basketball standings
	Conf.				Overall
Team	W		L	PCT	W		L	PCT
No. 5 UCLA	12	–	2	.857	27	–	5	.844
Oregon State	10	–	4	.714	18	–	9	.667
Oregon	10	–	4	.714	19	–	11	.633
Washington	9	–	5	.643	22	–	6	.786
Washington State	8	–	6	.571	18	–	8	.692
California	4	–	10	.286	12	–	14	.462
Stanford	3	–	11	.214	9	–	18	.333
USC	0	–	14	.000	11	–	16	.407
Rankings from AP Poll

The 1975–76 UCLA Bruins men's basketball team represented the University of California, Los Angeles in the 1975–76 NCAA Division I men's basketball season. Gene Bartow as the first coach of the post-Wooden era, began his first year as head coach.

The Bruins were ranked #2 in the polls and opened in St. Louis against #1 Indiana, and lost 84–64. UCLA won the Pac-8 title (regular season) and accepted the bid to the 32-team NCAA tournament. They advanced to the Final Four, but lost again to eventual champion Indiana, 65–51. This was the last of ten consecutive Final Fours for UCLA, going back to March 1967 (an NCAA record streak); they were upset in the Sweet 16 in 1977.

== Starting lineup ==
Position	Player	Class
F	Marques Johnson	Jr.
F	Richard Washington	Jr.
C	David Greenwood	Fr.
G	Raymond Townsend	So.
G	Andre McCarter	Sr.

== Roster ==
1975–76 UCLA Bruins men's basketball team
Players
Coaches

Pos.	#	Name	Height	Weight	Year	Hometown
C	35	Ralph Drollinger	7 ft 1 in (2.16 m)	230 lb (104 kg)	Sr	La Mesa, California
C	34	David Greenwood	6 ft 10 in (2.08 m)	217 lb (98 kg)	Fr	Los Angeles, California
G	24	Roy Hamilton	6 ft 2 in (1.88 m)	168 lb (76 kg)	Fr	Los Angeles, California
G	14	Brad Holland	6 ft 2 in (1.88 m)	180 lb (82 kg)	Fr	La Crescenta, California
F	54	Marques Johnson (C)	6 ft 6 in (1.98 m)	215 lb (98 kg)	Jr	Los Angeles, California
G	30	David Byrum	6 ft 4 in (1.93 m)	195 lb (88 kg)	Jr	Santa Monica, California
G	45	Andre McCarter	6 ft 3 in (1.91 m)	175 lb (79 kg)	Sr	Philadelphia, Pennsylvania
F	53	Wilbert Olinde	6 ft 7 in (2.01 m)	205 lb (93 kg)	Jr	La Mesa, California
G/F	55	Gavin Smith	6 ft 6 in (1.98 m)	189 lb (86 kg)	Jr	Sherman Oaks, California
G	44	Jim Spillane	5 ft 11 in (1.8 m)	149 lb (68 kg)	Jr	Palos Verdes Estates, California
G	22	Raymond Townsend	6 ft 2 in (1.88 m)	160 lb (73 kg)	So	San Jose, California
C	32	Brett Vroman	6 ft 11 in (2.11 m)	210 lb (95 kg)	So	Provo, Utah
F/C	31	Richard Washington (C)	6 ft 10 in (2.08 m)	226 lb (103 kg)	Jr	Portland, Oregon

Head coach

Gene Bartow

Assistant coach(es)

- Larry Farmer (UCLA)
- Lee Hunt (Central Missouri State)

Legend

- (C) Team captain
- (S) Suspended
- (I) Ineligible
- (W) Walk-on
- Injured
- Current redshirt

Roster

== Schedule ==
Date time, TV	Rank^{#}	Opponent^{#}	Result	Record	Site city, state
Regular Season
November 29, 1975*	No. 2	vs. No. 1 Indiana	L 64–84	0–1	St. Louis Arena; St. Louis Missouri
December 5, 1975*	No. 5	San Jose State	W 90–60	1–1	Pauley Pavilion; Los Angeles, CA
December 6, 1975*	No. 5	Southern Illinois	W 81–60	2–1	Pauley Pavilion; Los Angeles, CA
December 15, 1975*	No. 5	San Diego State	W 101–86	3–1	Pauley Pavilion; Los Angeles, CA
December 18, 1975*	No. 6	Missouri	W 83–71	4–1	Pauley Pavilion; Los Angeles, CA
December 20, 1975*	No. 6	Seattle	W 106–72	5–1	Pauley Pavilion; Los Angeles, CA
December 23, 1975*	No. 4	Baylor	W 96–75	6–1	Pauley Pavilion; Los Angeles, CA
December 29, 1975*	No. 4	Santa Clara; Bruin Classic	W 52–48	7–1	Pauley Pavilion; Los Angeles, CA
December 30, 1975*	No. 4	Purdue; Bruin Classic	W 99–86	8–1	Pauley Pavilion; Los Angeles, CA
January 2, 1976*	No. 4	Denver	W 111–79	9–1	Pauley Pavilion; Los Angeles, CA
January 3, 1976*	No. 4	No. 5 Notre Dame	W 86–70	10–1	Pauley Pavilion; Los Angeles, CA
January 8, 1976	No. 3	at Oregon	W 62–61	11–1 (1–0)	McArthur Court; Eugene, OR
January 10, 1976	No. 3	at Oregon State	L 58–75 (Note: Oregon State vacated 15 wins from the 1975–76 season. UCLA record book records the vacated loss as a win)	12–1 (2–0)	Gill Coliseum; Corvallis, OR
January 16, 1976	No. 8	Stanford	W 68–67	13–1 (3–0)	Pauley Pavilion; Los Angeles, CA
January 17, 1976	No. 8	California	W 80–71	14–1 (4–0)	Pauley Pavilion; Los Angeles, CA
January 22, 1976*	No. 6	UC Santa Barbara	W 64–50	15–1	Pauley Pavilion; Los Angeles, CA
January 24, 1976*	No. 6	at No. 15 Notre Dame	L 85–95	15–2	Athletic & Convocation Center; Notre Dame, IN
January 31, 1976	No. 12	USC	W 68–62	16–2 (5–0)	Pauley Pavilion; Los Angeles, CA
February 5, 1976	No. 9	at No. 6 Washington	W 92–87	17–2 (6–0)	Hec Edmundson Pavilion; Seattle, WA
February 7, 1976	No. 9	at Washington State	W 91–71	18–2 (7–0)	Beasley Coliseum; Pullman, WA
February 12, 1976	No. 6	Washington State	W 104–78	19–2 (8–0)	Pauley Pavilion; Los Angeles, CA
February 14, 1976	No. 6	No. 9 Washington	W 78–76	20–2 (9–0)	Pauley Pavilion; Los Angeles, CA
February 19, 1976	No. 5	Oregon State	W 78–69	21–2 (10–0)	Pauley Pavilion; Los Angeles, CA
February 21, 1976	No. 5	Oregon	L 45–65	21–3 (10–1)	Pauley Pavilion; Los Angeles, CA
February 27, 1976	No. 9	at California	W 113–93	22–3 (11–1)	Harmon Gym; Berkeley, CA
February 28, 1976	No. 9	at Stanford	W 120–74	23–3 (12–1)	Maples Pavilion; Stanford, CA
March 6, 1976	No. 7	at USC	W 87–73	24–3 (13–1)	Los Angeles Memorial Sports Arena; Los Angeles, CA
NCAA Tournament
March 13, 1976*	No. 6	vs. San Diego State; First round	W 74–64	25–3	ASU Activity Center; Tempe, AZ
March 18, 1976*	No. 5	No. 20 Pepperdine; Regional semifinal	W 70–61	26–3	Pauley Pavilion; Los Angeles, CA
March 20, 1976*	No. 5	No. 15 Arizona; Regional Final	W 82–66	27–3	Pauley Pavilion; Los Angeles, CA
March 27, 1976*	No. 5	vs. No. 1 Indiana; National semifinal	L 51–65	27–4	Spectrum; Philadelphia, PA
March 29, 1976*	No. 5	vs. Rutgers; National third-place game	W 106–92	28–4	Spectrum; Philadelphia, PA
*Non-conference game. ^{#}Rankings from AP Poll. (#) Tournament seedings in parentheses. All times are in Pacific time.
