= 1975–76 Washington Huskies men's basketball team =

American college basketball season

1975–76 Washington Huskies men's basketball

NCAA Tournament, First round
- Conference: Pacific-8 Conference

Ranking
- Coaches: No. 10
- Record: 22–6 (9–5 Pac-8)
- Head coach: Marv Harshman (5th season)
- Assistant coach: Bob Johnson
- Home arena: Hec Edmundson Pavilion

1975–76 Pacific-8 Conference men's basketball standings
	Conf.				Overall
Team	W		L	PCT	W		L	PCT
No. 5 UCLA	12	–	2	.857	27	–	5	.844
Oregon State	10	–	4	.714	18	–	9	.667
Oregon	10	–	4	.714	19	–	11	.633
Washington	9	–	5	.643	22	–	6	.786
Washington State	8	–	6	.571	18	–	8	.692
California	4	–	10	.286	12	–	14	.462
Stanford	3	–	11	.214	9	–	18	.333
USC	0	–	14	.000	11	–	16	.407
Rankings from AP Poll

The 1975–76 Washington Huskies men's basketball team represented the University of Washington for the 1975–76 NCAA Division I men's basketball season. Led by fifth-year head coach Marv Harshman, the Huskies were members of the Pacific-8 Conference and played their home games on campus at Hec Edmundson Pavilion in Seattle, Washington.

The Huskies were 22–5 overall in the regular season and 9–5 in conference play, fourth in the standings. In their final three games, all on the road, the eighth-ranked Huskies defeated #17 Oregon, but then lost at Oregon State and Washington State.

Washington made the 32-team NCAA Tournament as an at-large team, their first appearance in 23 years. The NCAA announced the selections prior to the end of the regular season, two days before the Huskies' loss to the rival Cougars in Pullman. Oregon was seeded into the quarterfinals of the twelve-team NIT, while OSU and WSU stayed home.

The eleventh-ranked Huskies met #10 Missouri in the first round in Lawrence, Kansas, and lost by two points. Despite this close loss, the final AP poll dropped them out of the top twenty; they ended at 22–6 (.786), but on a three-game losing streak. (Missouri also fell in that poll, four slots to fourteenth.)

The next NCAA tournament appearance for Washington was eight years away.

== Postseason result ==
Date time, TV	Rank^{#}	Opponent^{#}	Result	Record	Site (attendance) city, state
NCAA Tournament
Sat, March 13*; 10:30 am	No. 11	vs. No. 10 Missouri; First round	L 67–69	22–6	Allen Fieldhouse (11,130); Lawrence, Kansas
*Non-conference game. ^{#}Rankings from AP poll. (#) Tournament seedings in parentheses. All times are in Pacific time.
