= 1979–80 Washington State Cougars men's basketball team =

American college basketball season

1979–80 Washington State Cougars men's basketball

NCAA tournament, First round
- Conference: Pacific-10
- Record: 22–6 (14–4 Pac-10)
- Head coach: George Raveling (8th season)
- Home arena: Performing Arts Coliseum

1979–80 Pacific-10 Conference men's basketball standings
	Conf.				Overall
Team	W		L	PCT	W		L	PCT
^#5 Oregon State	16	–	2	.889	26	–	3	.897
No. 18 Arizona State	15	–	3	.833	22	–	7	.759
Washington State	14	–	4	.778	22	–	6	.786
*UCLA	12	–	6	.667	17	–	9	.654
Washington	9	–	9	.500	18	–	10	.643
Arizona	6	–	12	.333	12	–	15	.444
USC	5	–	13	.278	12	–	15	.444
Oregon	5	–	13	.278	10	–	17	.370
Stanford	5	–	13	.278	7	–	19	.269
California	3	–	15	.167	8	–	19	.296
As of April 15, 1980; *Oregon State vacated all tournament games (0–1) due to NCAA sanctions. Disputed record (16-2, 26-4)^UCLA vacated all tournament games (5–1) due to NCAA sanctions. Disputed record (22-10, 12-6); Rankings from AP Poll

The 1979–80 Washington State Cougars men's basketball team represented Washington State University for the 1979–80 NCAA Division I men's basketball season. Led by eighth-year head coach George Raveling, the Cougars were members of the Pacific-10 Conference and played their home games on campus at the Performing Arts Coliseum in Pullman, Washington.

The Cougars were 22–5 overall in the regular season and 14–4 in conference play, third in the standings.

For the first time since its national runner-up finish in 1941, WSU was invited to the 48-team NCAA tournament and were seeded fifth in the Mideast region; they met twelfth seed Penn, the Ivy League champion, in the first round in West Lafayette, Indiana. The Cougars had a ten-point lead early in the second half, but it was tied at 51 with just under four minutes to go when Don Collins fouled out and Penn outscored the Cougars eleven to four.

WSU's next NCAA appearance was three years away in 1983.

== Roster ==
1979–80 Washington State Cougars men's basketball team
Players	Coaches
Pos. / # / Name / Height / Weight / Year / Hometown; F / 42 / Don Collins / 6 ft 6 in (1.98 m) / 190 lb (86 kg) / Sr / Toledo, Ohio	Head coach: George Raveling; Assistant coach(es) Legend: (C) Team captain; (S) Suspended; (I) Ineligible; (W) Walk-on; Injured; Current redshirt

== Postseason result ==
Date time, TV	Rank^{#}	Opponent^{#}	Result	Record	Site (attendance) city, state
NCAA Tournament
Thu, March 6*; 6:10 pm	(5 ME)	vs. (12ME) Penn; First round	L 55–62	22–6	Mackey Arena (12,632); West Lafayette, Indiana
*Non-conference game. ^{#}Rankings from AP poll. (#) Tournament seedings in parentheses. All times are in Pacific time.
