= 1973–74 Washington State Cougars men's basketball team =

American college basketball season

1973–74 Washington State Cougars men's basketball
- Conference: Pacific-8
- Record: 8–21 (3–11 Pac-8)
- Head coach: George Raveling (2nd season)
- Home arena: Performing Arts Coliseum

1973–74 Pacific-8 Conference men's basketball standings
	Conf.				Overall
Team	W		L	PCT	W		L	PCT
No. 2 UCLA	12	–	2	.857	26	–	4	.867
USC	11	–	3	.786	24	–	5	.828
Oregon	9	–	5	.643	15	–	11	.577
Washington	7	–	7	.500	16	–	10	.615
Oregon State	6	–	8	.429	13	–	13	.500
Stanford	5	–	9	.357	11	–	14	.440
California	3	–	11	.214	9	–	17	.346
Washington State	3	–	11	.214	8	–	21	.276
Rankings from AP Poll

The 1973–74 Washington State Cougars men's basketball team represented Washington State University for the 1973–74 NCAA Division I men's basketball season. Led by second-year head coach George Raveling, the Cougars were members of the Pacific-8 Conference and played their home games on campus at the new Performing Arts Coliseum in Pullman, Washington.

The Cougars were 8–21 overall in the regular season and 3–11 in conference play, tied for last in the standings.

The court surface at the new coliseum was tartan (polyurethane) for its first decade; a traditional hardwood floor debuted in the fall of 1983.
