= 1978–79 Washington State Cougars men's basketball team =

American college basketball season

1978–79 Washington State Cougars men's basketball
- Conference: Pacific-10
- Record: 18–9 (10–8 Pac-10)
- Head coach: George Raveling (7th season)
- Home arena: Performing Arts Coliseum

1978–79 Pacific-10 Conference men's basketball standings
	Conf.				Overall
Team	W		L	PCT	W		L	PCT
No. 2 UCLA	15	–	3	.833	25	–	5	.833
USC	14	–	4	.778	20	–	9	.690
Oregon State	11	–	7	.611	18	–	10	.643
Washington State	10	–	8	.556	18	–	9	.667
Arizona	10	–	8	.556	16	–	11	.593
Arizona State	7	–	11	.389	12	–	15	.444
Oregon	7	–	11	.389	12	–	15	.444
Stanford	6	–	12	.333	12	–	15	.444
Washington	6	–	12	.333	11	–	16	.407
California	4	–	14	.222	6	–	21	.222
Rankings from AP Poll

The 1978–79 Washington State Cougars men's basketball team represented Washington State University for the 1978–79 NCAA Division I men's basketball season. Led by seventh-year head coach George Raveling, the Cougars were members of the Pacific-10 Conference and played their home games on campus at the Performing Arts Coliseum in Pullman, Washington.

The Cougars were 18–9 overall in the regular season and 10–8 in conference play, tied for fourth in the standings. A late season loss at Arizona likely kept them out of the NIT.
