= Washington State Cougars men's basketball =

Men's basketball team of Washington State University

| 2026–27 Washington State Cougars men's basketball team |
- University: Washington State University
- Head coach: David Riley (3rd season)
- Location: Pullman, Washington
- Arena: Beasley Coliseum (capacity: 12,058)
- Conference: Pac-12
- Nickname: Cougars
- Colors: Crimson and gray

NCAA Division I tournament runner-up
- 1941
Other NCAA Division I tournament results
| Final Four | 1941 |
| Elite Eight | 1941 |
| Sweet Sixteen | 2008 |
| Appearances | 1941, 1980, 1983, 1994, 2007, 2008, 2024 |

Pre-tournament Helms national champions
- 1917

Conference regular-season champions
- 1917, 1941

Uniforms
| Home | Away | Alternate |

The Washington State Cougars men's basketball team represents Washington State University and competes in the Pac-12 Conference (Pac-12) of NCAA Division I. The Cougars play their home games on campus in Pullman at Beasley Coliseum, which has a capacity of 12,058. They are currently led by head coach David Riley. Washington State has appeared in the NCAA Division I men's basketball tournament seven times, most recently in 2024.

== History ==
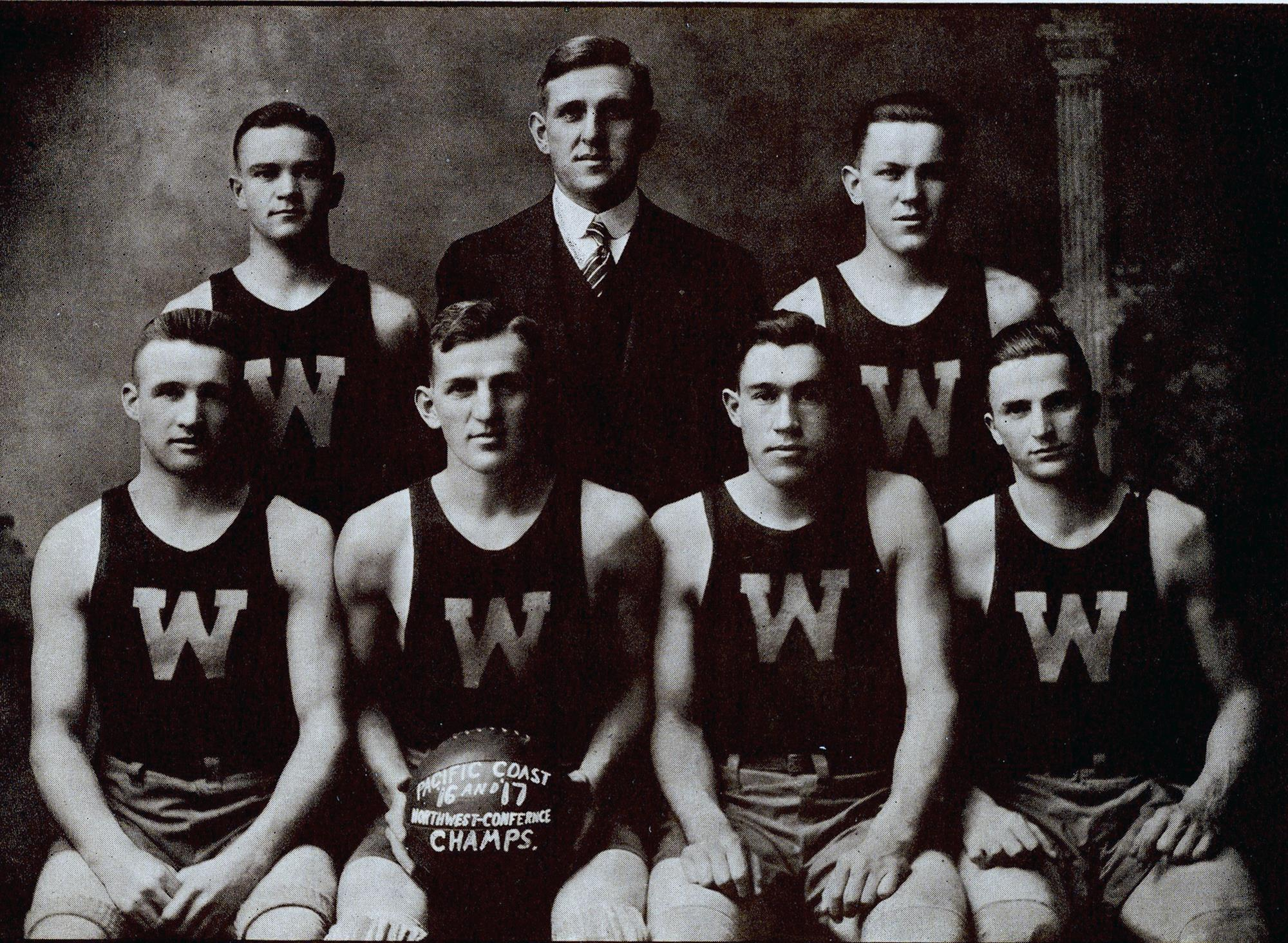
1916–17 Washington State men's basketball team

Washington State began varsity intercollegiate competition in men's basketball in 1902. The Cougars were retroactively awarded as a national champion in 1917 by the Helms Athletic Foundation in 1957 and the Premo-Porretta Power Poll in 1995. While the NCAA lists the historical Helms selections for reference, neither the Helms nor the Premo-Porretta titles are officially recognized as NCAA national championships. The team played to large crowds in the late-1970s when George Raveling was head coach.

For the better part of seven decades, the Cougars were a consistent contender in the Pac-10 and its predecessor, the Pacific Coast Conference. After a dark period in the late 1990s and early 2000s, there was the beginning of a resurgence under coach Dick Bennett. The 2004–05 season saw a large increase in student support as the team finished within a few wins of a .500 record (along with a stunning upset win against Arizona, an eventual Elite Eight team). Bennett retired at the end of the 2005–06 season and was replaced by his son, Tony.

Tony Bennett tied the all-time WSU record for wins (26) twice in three seasons as head coach before leaving to coach the Virginia Cavaliers in 2009. Washington State had recently cancelled a trip to the 2009 Final Four for Bennett and his staff, and was considering dropping chartered recruiting trips which had been started one year prior at Bennett's request.

=== 2006–07 ===
The Cougars earned a #3 seed in the NCAA tournament and beat Oral Roberts 70–54 in the first round. The Cougars then lost to Vanderbilt in the second round 78–74 in double overtime. Their final record was 13–5 in the Pac-10 and 26–8 overall, which tied the school record for most wins in a season. During the 2006–07 season, the Cougars swept rival Washington, Arizona, Arizona State, USC, Oregon State, and California. In the tournament, the coaching staff wore a pin saying TAY, which stood for Turn-Around Year. After the season, Coach Tony Bennett received the Naismith Coach of the Year award, the highest honor for a college basketball coach.

=== 2007–08 ===
In 2008, the Cougars returned to the NCAA tournament. The Cougars earned a #4 seed and were matched up against #13 seed Winthrop University. The Cougars dominated in the second half after a 29–29 tie in the first half to finish 71–40, far beyond the 9 point margin they were favored by.

After two straight victories in the NCAA Tournament, the Cougars headed to the Sweet Sixteen for the second time in school history. In the Sweet Sixteen, Washington State was matched against the #1 overall seed North Carolina. During the first half, both teams seem evenly matched, but North Carolina took control in the second half and won by a score of 68–47. The Cougars finished the 2007–08 season with a record of 26–9.

=== Since 2019 ===
On March 27, 2019, Smith was named as the 19th head coach of Washington State, agreeing to a six-year contract worth $1.4 million annually. He was formally introduced at a press conference on April 1, 2019. In his first season at Washington State, Smith led the Cougars to a 6–12 conference record (16-16 overall), their best since 2011–12. In the first round of the Pac-12 Tournament, Washington State beat Colorado, their first win in the conference tournament in over 10 years. In September 2021, Smith signed a contract extension through the 2026-27 season.

During the 2021-22 season, Smith led the Cougars to their first winning record in conference play (11-9) in 14 years (2007-08). The Cougars followed up their regular season success with a win in the Pac-12 Tournament before losing to eventual runner-up UCLA. Following that, an NIT berth as a No. 4 seed gave the Cougs their first postseason bout in 11 years. Their first round win against Santa Clara (63-50) notched their first 20-win season since 2010-11. The 2021–22 season ended after an impressive run that landed the Cougs in the Semifinals of the NIT (for the second time in program history) against Texas A&M, where their final record on the season was 22-15.

On February 19, 2024, the Cougars returned to the AP Poll for the first time since the 2007–08 season (#21 with a 20–6 record). The following week, Washington State completed a season sweep of the 4th ranked team in the country, Arizona, to move into 1st place in the PAC-12 and all but ensure their first March Madness appearance in 16 years.

On March 17, 2024, Washington State was given an at-large bid by the selection committee, officially ending their 16-year long NCAA Tournament drought. The Cougars received a 7-seed and a first-round matchup against the Drake Bulldogs.

== Head coaches ==
- John B. Evans (1901–03)
- James N. Ashmore (1904–05)
- Everett M. Sweeley (1905–07)
- John R. Bender (1907–08)
- Fred Bohler (1908–26)
- Karl Schlademan (1926–28)
- Jack Friel (1928–58)
- Marv Harshman (1959–71)
- Bob Greenwood (1971–72)
- George Raveling* (1972–83)
- Len Stevens (1983–87)
- Kelvin Sampson (1987–94)
- Kevin Eastman (1994–99)
- Paul Graham (1999–2003)
- Dick Bennett (2003–06)
- Tony Bennett (2006–09)
- Ken Bone (2009–14)
- Ernie Kent (2014–19)
- Kyle Smith (2019–24)
- David Riley (2024–present)

Winningest Coaches (Min. 100 games)
| Coach | Wins | Losses | Percentage (%) |
|---|---|---|---|
| Tony Bennett | 69 | 33 | .676 |
| Jack Friel | 495 | 377 | .568 |
| J. Fred Bohler | 226 | 177 | .561 |
| George Raveling | 166 | 137 | .548 |
| Kyle Smith | 94 | 71 | .573 |
| Kelvin Sampson | 103 | 103 | .500 |
| Marv Harshman | 155 | 181 | .461 |
| Ken Bone | 80 | 86 | .482 |

George Raveling* was the first African American head coach in the Pacific Athletic Conference (known as the PAC 8 at the time). He coached from 1972–1983 and won 167 games at WSU.

Head coach Tony Bennett announced that he was leaving for Virginia following the 2008–09 season. Bennett, who became head coach after his father Dick Bennett's retirement, finished the season with a 17–16 record. In the previous two years, he led the Cougars to consecutive NCAA tournament appearances; father and son coached the Cougars for three seasons each.

Ken Bone replaced Bennett as head coach of the WSU Cougars Men's Basketball Team in February 2009. Bone served as head coach until 2014 and he was followed as head coach by Ernie Kent. Kent served as head coach until 2019. He was replaced by Kyle Smith, who served in the role until 2024. He was replaced by current head coach, David Riley.

== Postseason ==
=== NCAA tournament results ===
The Cougars have appeared in seven NCAA Tournaments, with an overall record of 7–7.

| Year | Seed | Round | Opponent | Result |
|---|---|---|---|---|
| 1941 | | Elite Eight; Final Four; National Final | Creighton; Arkansas; Wisconsin | W 48–39; W 64–53; L 34–39 |
| 1980 | 5 | Round of 48 | (12) Penn | L 55–62 |
| 1983 | 8 | Round of 48; Round of 32 | (9) Weber State (1) Virginia | W 62–52; L 49–54 |
| 1994 | 8 | Round of 64 | (9) Boston College | L 64–67 |
| 2007 | 3 | Round of 64; Round of 32 | (14) Oral Roberts (6) Vanderbilt | W 70–54; L 74–78 ^{2OT} |
| 2008 | 4 | Round of 64; Round of 32; Sweet Sixteen | (13) Winthrop (5) Notre Dame (1) North Carolina | W 71–40; W 61–41; L 47–68 |
| 2024 | 7 | First Round; Second Round | (10) Drake (2) Iowa State | W 66–61; L 56–67 |

=== NIT results ===
The Cougars have appeared in seven National Invitation Tournaments (NIT), with a combined record of 10–7.

| Year | Round | Opponent | Result |
|---|---|---|---|
| 1992 | First Round; Second Round | Minnesota; New Mexico | W 72–70; L 71–79 |
| 1995 | First Round; Second Round; Quarterfinals | Texas Tech; Illinois State; Canisius | W 94–82; W 83–80; L 80–99 |
| 1996 | First Round; Second Round | Gonzaga; Nebraska | W 92–73; L 73–82 |
| 2009 | First Round | Saint Mary's | L 57–68 |
| 2011 | First Round; Second Round; Quarterfinals; Semifinals | Long Beach State; Oklahoma State; Northwestern; Wichita State | W 85–74; W 74–64; W 69–66 ^{OT} L 44–75 |
| 2022 | First Round; Second Round; Quarterfinals; Semifinals | Santa Clara; SMU; BYU; Texas A&M | W 63–50; W 75–63; W 77–58; L 56–72 |
| 2023 | First Round | Eastern Washington | L 74–81 |

=== CBI results ===
The Cougars have appeared in one College Basketball Invitational (CBI). Their combined record is 4–2.

| Year | Round | Opponent | Result |
|---|---|---|---|
| 2012 | First Round; Quarterfinals; Semifinals; Finals Game 1 Finals Game 2 Finals Game 3 | San Francisco; Wyoming; Oregon State; Pittsburgh; Pittsburgh; Pittsburgh | W 89–75; W 61–41; W 72–55; W 67–66; L 53–57; L 65–71 |

=== CBC results ===
The Cougars have appeared in one College Basketball Crown (CBC). Their combined record is 0–1.

| Year | Round | Opponent | Result |
|---|---|---|---|
| 2025 | First Round | Georgetown | L 82–85 |

== Retired numbers ==
The Cougars have retired two jersey numbers in program history, most recently Klay Thompson's number 1 in 2020.

Washington State Cougars retired numbers
| No. | Player | Pos. | Career | No. ret. | Ref. |
| 1 | Klay Thompson | SG | 2008–2011 | 2020 | |
| 55 | Steve Puidokas | C | 1973–1977 | | |

== Cougars in the NBA ==
Washington State has had 21 former players who have gone on to play in the NBA.

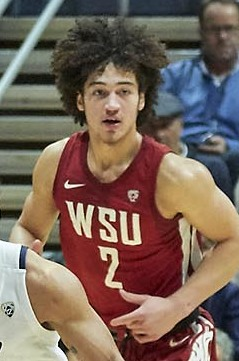
C. J. Elleby

| Name | Years in NBA |
|---|---|
| Josh Akognon | 2013 |
| Norton Barnhill | 1977 |
| Aron Baynes | 2013–2021 |
| Robert Bishop | 1949 |
| Don Collins | 1981–1987 |
| Gene Conley | 1953–1964 |
| Cedric Coward | 2025-Present |
| Ron Davis | 1977–1982 |
| James Donaldson | 1981–1995 |
| Craig Ehlo | 1984–1997 |
| C. J. Elleby | 2021–2022 |
| Malachi Flynn | 2021–2023 |
| Isaac Fontaine | 2002 |
| Robert Franks | 2021 |
| Ed Gayda | 1951 |
| Mouhamed Gueye | 2023–Present |
| Mark Hendrickson | 1997–2000 |
| Brian Quinnett | 1990–1992 |
| Randy Stoll | 1968 |
| Klay Thompson | 2012–Present |
| Kyle Weaver | 2009–2011 |
| Jaylen Wells | 2024–Present |
| Guy Williams | 1985–1986 |

== Cougars playing in overseas leagues ==
- C. J. Elleby, in the Israeli Basketball Premier League

== Rivalries ==
=== Gonzaga ===
Gonzaga University is a Jesuit university in Spokane, about 75 miles (120 km) north of Pullman. As of the 2013–14 season, Washington State has a 98–50 (.662) lead in the series against the Bulldogs; the series began in 1907 and has most recently been played annually since 2001. The game in December 2007 marked the first time the two met as ranked teams. Visiting Washington State was ranked #6 in the AP Poll and won 51–47 over #19 Gonzaga at the McCarthey Athletic Center.

=== Idaho ===
A non-conference series since 1959, Washington State has played the Idaho Vandals of neighboring Moscow annually since 1906 in a rivalry dubbed the Battle of the Palouse; the U of I is less than eight miles (13 km) east of Pullman. They often met four or five times per season until 1964, reduced to twice a season for the next decade. It has since become an annual event early in the schedule (except for the mid-1990s, when two games per season were played). The continuing rivalry is the oldest in the western United States, four years older than WSU's series with the Washington Huskies.

The two played the first-ever regular season basketball game in the newly-enclosed Kibbie Dome in January 1976, won by the Cougars. The rivalry was at its peak in December 1982 when 11,000 were in the same venue for a Saturday night overtime thriller, won by the Vandals.

Washington State has a 167–110 (.603) lead in the series through November 2021, when Washington State won 109–61 in Moscow, for a fourth straight win.

=== Washington ===
The University of Washington is located in Seattle, nearly 300 miles (480 km) west of Pullman. As of 2023, the Washington Huskies have a 186–111 (.626) lead in the series that began in 1910. Recently, Washington State has dominated, winning 7 of the last 9 meetings.

== Statistical records ==
=== Scoring ===
Career
| Rk | Player | Points | Seasons |
|---|---|---|---|
| 1 | Isaac Fontaine | 2,003 | 1993–94 1994–95 1995–96 1996–97 |
| 2 | Steve Puidokas | 1,894 | 1973–74 1974–75 1975–76 1976–77 |
| 3 | Klay Thompson | 1,756 | 2008–09 2009–10 2010–11 |
| 4 | Don Collins | 1,563 | 1976–77 1977–78 1978–79 1979–80 |
| 5 | DaVonté Lacy | 1,548 | 2011–12 2012–13 2013–14 2014–15 |
| 6 | Brock Motum | 1,530 | 2009–10 2010–11 2011–12 2012–13 |
| 7 | Mark Hendrickson | 1,496 | 1992–93 1993–94 1994–95 1995–96 |
| 8 | Marcus Moore | 1,458 | 2000–01 2001–02 2002–03 2003–04 |
| 9 | Bennie Seltzer | 1,423 | 1989–90 1990–91 1991–92 1992–93 |
| 10 | Josh Hawkinson | 1,414 | 2013–14 2014–15 2015–16 2016–17 |

Season
| Rk | Player | Points | Season |
|---|---|---|---|
| 1 | Klay Thompson | 733 | 2010–11 |
| 2 | Isaac Fontaine | 657 | 1996–97 |
| 3 | Don Collins | 647 | 1979–80 |
| 4 | Brock Motum | 613 | 2011–12 |
| 5 | Klay Thompson | 609 | 2009–10 |
| 6 | Brock Motum | 597 | 2012–13 |
| | Vince Hanson | 597 | 1944–45 |
| 8 | C. J. Elleby | 589 | 2019–20 |
| 9 | Robert Franks | 583 | 2018–19 |
| 10 | Terrence Lewis | 575 | 1991–92 |

Single Game
| Rk | Player | Points | Season | Opponent |
|---|---|---|---|---|
| 1 | Brian Quinnett | 45 | 1986–87 | Loyola-Marymount |
| 2 | Brian Quinnett | 44 | 1988–89 | USC |
| 3 | Guy Williams | 43 | 1982–83 | Idaho State |
| | Klay Thompson | 43 | 2009–10 | San Diego |
| | Klay Thompson | 43 | 2010–11 | Washington |
| 6 | Steve Puidokas | 42 | 1974–75 | Gonzaga |
| | Marcus Moore | 42 | 2002–03 | Gonzaga |
| 8 | Noah Williams | 40 | 2020–21 | Stanford |
| 9 | J Locklier | 40 | 2001–02 | Centenary |
| 10 | DaVonté Lacy | 39 | 2013–14 | California |

=== Assists ===
Career
| Rk | Player | Assists | Seasons |
|---|---|---|---|
| 1 | Bennie Seltzer | 473 | 1989–90 1990–91 1991–92 1992–93 |
| 2 | Kyle Weaver | 465 | 2004–05 2005–06 2006–07 2007–08 |
| 3 | Keith Morrison | 456 | 1982–83 1983–84 1984–85 1985–86 |
| 4 | Donminic Ellison | 441 | 1993–94 1994–95 1995–96 |
| 5 | Marcus Moore | 423 | 2000–01 2001–02 2002–03 2003–04 |
| 6 | Reggie Moore | 419 | 2009–10 2010–11 2011–12 |
| 7 | Taylor Rochestie | 381 | 2006–07 2007–08 2008–09 |
| 8 | Ike Iroegbu | 375 | 2013–14 2014–15 2015–16 2016–17 |
| 9 | Marty Giovacchini | 371 | 1973–74 1974–75 1975–76 1976–77 |
| 10 | Blake Pengelly | 324 | 1996–97 1997–98 1998–99 1999–00 |

Season
| Rk | Player | Assists | Season |
|---|---|---|---|
| 1 | Reggie Moore | 193 | 2011–12 |
| 2 | Donminic Ellison | 192 | 1994–95 |
| 3 | Taylor Rochestie | 165 | 2007–08 |
| 4 | Kyle Weaver | 157 | 2006–07 |
| 5 | Donminic Ellison | 151 | 1995–96 |
| | Kyle Weaver | 151 | 2007–08 |
| 7 | Taylor Rochestie | 150 | 2008–09 |
| 8 | Brad Jackson | 145 | 1973–74 |
| 9 | Keith Morrison | 137 | 1984–85 |
| 10 | Craig Ehlo | 135 | 1982–83 |

Single Game
| Rk | Player | Assists | Season | Opponent |
|---|---|---|---|---|
| 1 | Donminic Ellison | 15 | 1994–95 | Cal State Northridge |

=== Rebounds ===
Career
| Rk | Player | Rebounds | Seasons |
|---|---|---|---|
| 1 | Josh Hawkinson | 1,015 | 2013–14 2014–15 2015–16 2016–17 |
| 2 | Steve Puidokas | 992 | 1973–74 1974–75 1975–76 1976–77 |
| 3 | Mark Hendrickson | 927 | 1992–93 1993–94 1994–95 1995–96 |
| 4 | Jim McKean | 844 | 1965–66 1966–67 1967–68 |
| 5 | Ted Werner | 837 | 1962–63 1963–64 1964–65 |
| 6 | Charlie Sells | 827 | 1959–60 1960–61 1961–62 |
| 7 | John Maras | 808 | 1957–58 1958–59 1959–60 |
| 8 | Carlos Daniel | 775 | 1994–95 1995–96 1996–97 1997–98 |
| 9 | Stuart House | 687 | 1976–77 1977–78 1978–79 1979–80 |
| 10 | James Donaldson | 677 | 1975–76 1976–77 1977–78 1978–79 |

Season
| Rk | Player | Rebounds | Season |
|---|---|---|---|
| 1 | Josh Hawkinson | 334 | 2014–15 |
| 2 | Ted Werner | 323 | 1963–64 |
| 3 | Josh Hawkinson | 321 | 2015–16 |
| 4 | Josh Hawkinson | 315 | 2016–17 |
| 5 | James Donaldson | 305 | 1977–78 |
| 6 | Jim McKean | 304 | 1966–67 |
| 7 | D.J. Shelton | 297 | 2013–14 |
| 8 | Ted Werner | 396 | 1964–65 |
| 9 | Charlie Sells | 286 | 1961–62 |
| 10 | John Maras | 285 | 1958–59 |

Single Game
| Rk | Player | Rebounds | Season | Opponent |
|---|---|---|---|---|
| 1 | Jim McKean | 27 | 1966–67 | West Virginia |
| 2 | Ted Werner | 24 | 1964–65 | UCLA |
| | James Donaldson | 24 | 1978–79 | Seattle Pacific |
| 4 | Charlie Sells | 23 | 1959–60 | Gonzaga |
| 5 | Bill Rehder | 21 | 1954–55 | Montana |
| | Charlie Sells | 21 | 1959–60 | Idaho |
| | Ted Werner | 21 | 1963–64 | Idaho |
| | Dwayne Scholten | 21 | 1986–87 | Delaware |
| 9 | Ted Werner | 20 | 1963–64 | USC |
| | Jim McKean | 20 | 1966–67 | Montana State |
| | Josh Hawkinson | 20 | 2015–16 | Washington |

== Record vs. Pac-12 opponents ==
The Washington State Cougars have the following all-time series records vs. Pac-12 opponents.

| Opponent | Wins | Losses | Pct. | Streak |
|---|---|---|---|---|
| Arizona | 20 | 69 | .225 | WSU 2 |
| Arizona St. | 42 | 46 | .477 | ASU 1 |
| California | 61 | 82 | .427 | WSU 1 |
| Colorado | 7 | 19 | .269 | Colorado 1 |
| Oregon | 130 | 176 | .425 | WSU 1 |
| Oregon St. | 131 | 172 | .432 | WSU 5 |
| Stanford | 67 | 83 | .447 | WSU 6 |
| UCLA | 19 | 113 | .144 | WSU 1 |
| USC | 50 | 81 | .382 | WSU 2 |
| Utah | 6 | 30 | .167 | WSU 1 |
| Washington | 111 | 185 | .375 | UW 1 |

- Note all-time series includes non-conference matchups.
