= Guy Williams (basketball) =

American basketball player (born 1960)

Personal information
- Born: July 1, 1960 (age 66) Los Angeles, California, U.S.
- Listed height: 6 ft 9 in (2.06 m)
- Listed weight: 200 lb (91 kg)

Career information
- High school: Bishop O'Dowd (Oakland, California)
- College: San Francisco (1978–1980); Washington State (1981–1983)
- NBA draft: 1983: 2nd round, 34th overall pick
- Drafted by: Washington Bullets
- Position: Small forward / power forward
- Number: 3, 34

Career history
- 1984–1985: Washington Bullets
- 1985: Golden State Warriors
- 1986–1987: Filanto Desio
- 1990: Teorematour Arese
- 1990: Aresium Milano
- 1990–1991: Chorale Roanne Basket

Career highlights
- Third-team Parade All-American (1978)
- Stats at NBA.com
- Stats at Basketball Reference

Guy Bernard Williams (born July 1, 1960) is an American former professional basketball player. Williams began his career as a point guard, but changed to the forward position upon entering the National Basketball Association (NBA). He played for the Washington Bullets and Golden State Warriors.

Williams played collegiately at San Francisco College from 1978 to 1980, and then transferred to Washington State where he played the 1981–1983 seasons. His son, Noah Williams, played college basketball at Washington State, Washington, and James Madison.

== Career statistics ==
Legend
GP	Games played	GS	Games started	MPG	Minutes per game
FG%	Field goal percentage	3P%	3-point field goal percentage	FT%	Free throw percentage
RPG	Rebounds per game	APG	Assists per game	SPG	Steals per game
BPG	Blocks per game	PPG	Points per game	**Bold**	Career high

=== NBA ===
==== Regular season ====
Year	Team	GP	GS	MPG	FG%	3P%	FT%	RPG	APG	SPG	BPG	PPG
1984–85	Washington	**21**	0	**5.7**	**.460**	**.250**	.400	**1.3**	**.4**	**.2**	.1	**2.9**
1985–86	Golden State	5	0	5.0	.400	–	.500	1.2	.0	**.2**	**.4**	1.4
Career		26	0	5.5	.456	.250	.455	1.3	.3	.2	.2	2.6
