= 1974–75 Washington State Cougars men's basketball team =

American college basketball season

1974–75 Washington State Cougars men's basketball
- Conference: Pacific-8
- Record: 10–16 (1–13 Pac-8)
- Head coach: George Raveling (3rd season)
- Home arena: Performing Arts Coliseum

1974–75 Pacific-8 Conference men's basketball standings
	Conf.				Overall
Team	W		L	PCT	W		L	PCT
No. 1 UCLA	12	–	2	.857	28	–	3	.903
No. 18 Oregon State	10	–	4	.714	19	–	12	.613
USC	8	–	6	.571	18	–	8	.692
California	7	–	7	.500	17	–	9	.654
Oregon	6	–	8	.429	21	–	9	.700
Washington	6	–	8	.429	16	–	10	.615
Stanford	6	–	8	.429	12	–	14	.462
Washington State	1	–	13	.071	10	–	16	.385
Rankings from AP Poll

The 1974–75 Washington State Cougars men's basketball team represented Washington State University for the 1974–75 NCAA Division I men's basketball season. Led by third-year head coach George Raveling, the Cougars were members of the Pacific-8 Conference and played their home games on campus at the Performing Arts Coliseum in Pullman, Washington.

The Cougars were 10–16 overall in the regular season and 1–13 in conference play, last in the standings. The sole win came in the last game over rival Washington in Seattle.

The NCAA Tournament expanded to 32 teams this season and for the first time, WSU hosted sub-regional games. Two opening round games in the West regional were played at the Performing Arts Coliseum on Saturday, March 15, with Montana and eventual champion UCLA advancing.
