= 2001–02 Washington State Cougars men's basketball team =

American college basketball season

2001–02 Washington State Cougars men's basketball
- Conference: Pacific-10 Conference
- Record: 6–21 (1–17 Pac-10)
- Head coach: Paul Graham (3rd season)
- Home arena: Beasley Coliseum

2001–02 Pacific-10 Conference men's basketball standings
	Conf.				Overall
Team	W		L	PCT	W		L	PCT
No. 6 Oregon	14	–	4	.778	26	–	9	.743
California	12	–	6	.667	23	–	9	.719
No. 10 Arizona†	12	–	6	.667	24	–	10	.706
No. 18 USC	12	–	6	.667	22	–	10	.688
Stanford	12	–	6	.667	20	–	10	.667
No. 20 UCLA	11	–	7	.611	21	–	12	.636
Arizona State	7	–	11	.389	12	–	15	.444
Washington	5	–	13	.278	11	–	17	.393
Oregon State	4	–	14	.222	11	–	17	.393
Washington State	1	–	17	.056	6	–	21	.222
† Conference tournament winner As of July 10, 2011; Rankings from Coaches Poll

The 2001–02 Washington State Cougars men's basketball team represented Washington State University for the 2001–02 NCAA Division I men's basketball season. Led by third-year head coach Paul Graham, the Cougars were members of the Pacific-10 Conference and played their home games on campus at Beasley Coliseum in Pullman, Washington.

The Cougars were 6–21 overall in the regular season and 1–17 in conference play, last in the standings.

The conference tournament, last played in 1990, resumed this year, but only the top eight teams qualified.
