= Josh Hawkinson =

American-born Japanese basketball player

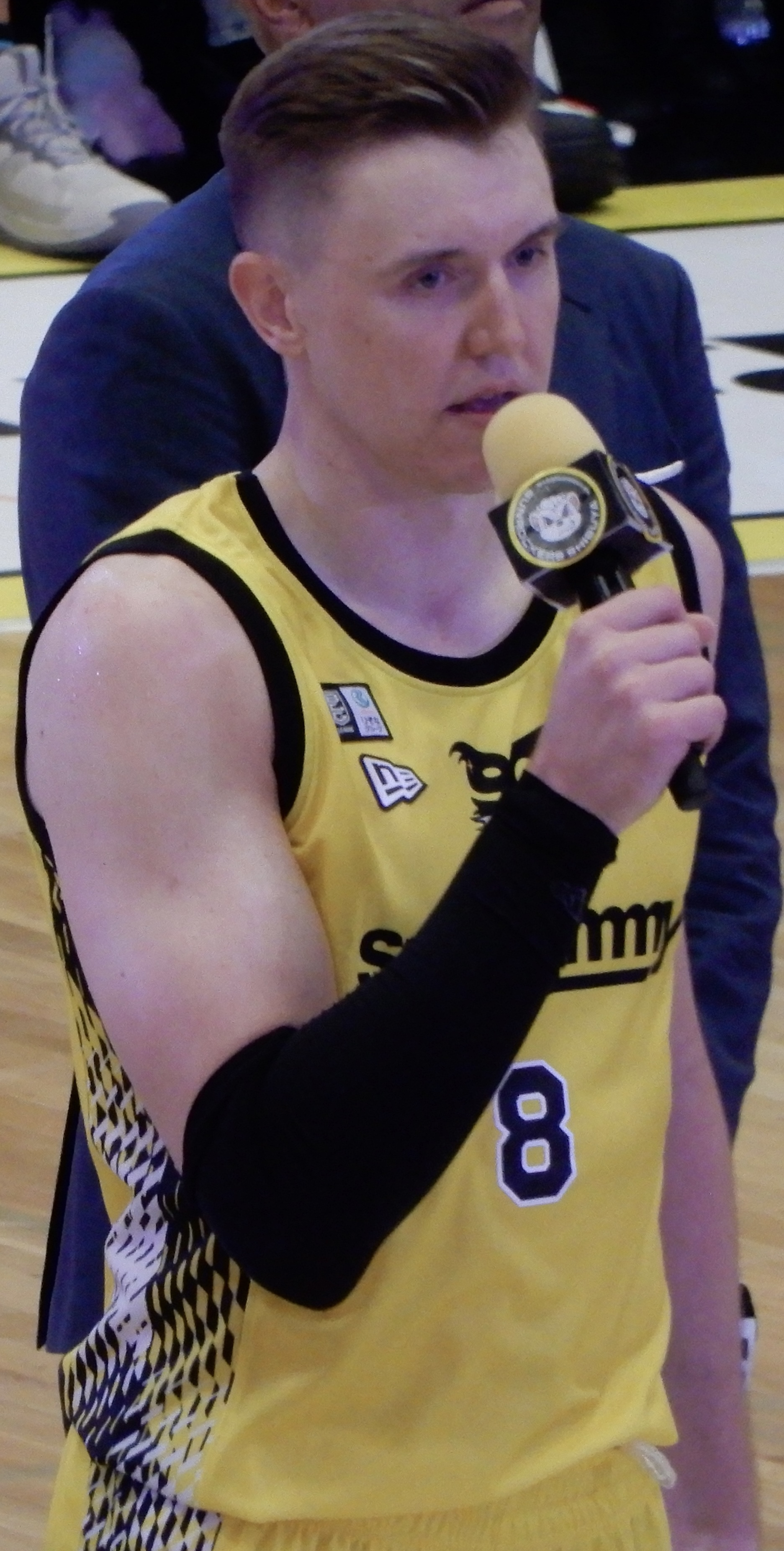
- Hawkinson with Sun Rockers in 2025

No. 8 – Sun Rockers Shibuya
- Position: Center / power forward
- League: B.League

Personal information
- Born: June 23, 1995 (age 31) Seattle, Washington, U.S.
- Listed height: 6 ft 10 in (2.08 m)
- Listed weight: 240 lb (109 kg)

Career information
- High school: Shorewood (Shoreline, Washington)
- College: Washington State (2013–2017)
- NBA draft: 2017: undrafted
- Playing career: 2017–present

Career history
- 2017–2020: Fighting Eagles Nagoya
- 2020–2023: Shinshu Brave Warriors
- 2023–present: Sun Rockers Shibuya

Career highlights
- Second-team All-Pac-12 (2017); Pac-12 Most Improved Player (2015)

Joshua Haakon Hawkinson (born June 23, 1995) is an American-born Japanese professional basketball player for Sun Rockers Shibuya of the B.League. He played college basketball for the Washington State Cougars, where he finished his career as the school's all-time leader in rebounds and double-doubles.

Hawkinson began his professional career in Japan in 2017, later becoming a Japanese citizen in 2023. He played for the Japanese national team at the 2023 FIBA Basketball World Cup and at the 2024 Olympics.

== Early life ==
Hawkinson was born in Seattle, Washington, to Nels and Nancy Hawkinson. He has one younger sister Carlyn, and his family lives in Shoreline, Washington. Both of his parents played basketball collegiately; his dad at Trinity Western University and his mom at the University of Washington.

Hawkinson attended Shorewood High School in Shoreline. Over his junior and senior seasons, Hawkinson led his team to a 32–14 record and averaged 20 points, 10 rebounds and 5 blocks per game. Hawkinson was very lightly recruited out of high school with no Power 5 conference schools interested in him, besides Washington State.

== College career ==
Hawkinson began his college career in 2013 for Washington State and played limited minutes in a supporting role as a freshman. He served as a backup to upperclassmen D.J. Shelton and Jordan Railey and went on to average 1.2 points, and 1.6 rebounds in just 6 minutes per game.

Following his freshman season, Washington States head coach Ken Bone was fired and replaced by new head coach Ernie Kent. Hawkinson thrived under Kent in his sophomore season at Washington State. His minutes per game skyrocketed from 6 to 33, and he became the second-most improved scorer in the nation from 1.2 to 14.7 points per game, and the most improved rebounder in the country from 1.6 to 10.8 rebounds per game. Hawkinson would go on to lead the league in rebounding and his 334 total rebounds and 20 double-doubles set single season Washington State records in both categories. He led the Pac-12 and NCAA in defensive rebounds per game at 8.7, and earned Pac-12 Most Improved Player of the Year and All-Pac-12 Honorable Mention honors.

As a junior, Hawkinson was given team captain responsibilities and once again led the league in rebounding and double-doubles. He improved both his points per game from 14.7 to 15.4, and rebounds per game from 10.8 to 11.1 and tied his own single-season Washington State record with another 20 double-doubles. He earned All-Pac-12 Honorable Mention for the second straight season and was named a Finalist for the Kareem Abdul-Jabbar Center of the year award.

In his senior campaign, Hawkinson retained his team captain status and led his team to a sweep of the Washington Huskies for the first time since the 2010–11 season. Hawkinson went on to average 15.5 points per game and 10.2 rebounds per game earning him All-Pac-12 Second Team honors. Hawkinson would also be selected to the Second Team All-District 20 team by the NABC and was named as a finalist for the Kareem Abdul-Jabbar Center of the year award for the second straight year. For his outstanding achievements both on and off the court, Hawkinson became the first Washington State player ever to be named a Senior CLASS Award First Team All-American. and followed that up by winning the Tom Hansen Conference Medal given to the Pac-12's "most outstanding senior student-athlete based on the exhibition of the greatest combination of performance and achievement in scholarship, athletics and leadership."

Academically, Hawkinson completed his bachelor's degree from Washington State University in just three years, receiving his degree in Management Operations in the summer of 2016 while being a three-time Pac-12 All-Academic honoree. In his senior year, Hawkinson finished his Master's of Business Administration in Data Analytics, completing both his bachelor's and master's degrees in four years, and was named the 2017 Pac-12 Scholar-Athlete of the Year. Hawkinson concluded his career tenth in points scored with 1,414 and set school records in double-doubles with 56 and rebounds with 1,015. He became the first Washington State player ever to amass 1,000 points and 1,000 rebounds, and was the 13th player in Pac-12 history to reach those marks.

=== College statistics ===
Year	Team	GP	GS	MPG	FG%	3P%	FT%	RPG	APG	SPG	BPG	PPG
2013–14	Washington State	28	0	6.4	.458	0.0	.600	1.6	0.2	0.0	0.1	1.2
2014–15	Washington State	31	29	32.7	.500	.200	.853	10.8	1.0	0.4	1.1	14.7
2015–16	Washington State	29	28	33.3	.543	.385	.778	11.1	1.5	0.7	1.1	15.4
2016–17	Washington State	31	31	35.4	.531	.406	.833	10.2	2.5	0.6	0.8	15.5
Career		119	88	27.4	.523	.350	.812	8.5	1.3	0.4	0.8	11.9

== Professional career ==
On June 26, 2017, Hawkinson signed his first professional contract with the Toyotsu Fighting Eagles of the Japanese B.League. He played for the Fighting Eagles in the 2017–18, 2018–19 and 2019–20 seasons.

For the 2020–21 season, Hawkinson joined the Shinshu Brave Warriors. He continued with the Brave Warriors in the 2021–22 and 2022–23 seasons.

On June 12, 2023, Hawkinson signed with Sun Rockers Shibuya.

== National team career ==
In February 2023, Hawkinson became a naturalized Japanese citizen. He played for the Japanese national team at the 2023 FIBA Basketball World Cup and at the 2024 Olympics.
