= 1982–83 Washington State Cougars men's basketball team =

American college basketball season

1982–83 Washington State Cougars men's basketball

NCAA tournament, Second round
- Conference: Pacific-10
- Record: 23–7 (14–4 Pac-10)
- Head coach: George Raveling (11th season)
- Assistant coaches: Len Stevens; Ron Righter
- Home arena: Beasley Coliseum

1982–83 Pacific-10 Conference men's basketball standings
	Conf.				Overall
Team	W		L	PCT	W		L	PCT
No. 7 UCLA	15	–	3	.833	23	–	6	.793
Washington State	14	–	4	.778	23	–	7	.767
Oregon State	12	–	6	.667	20	–	11	.645
Arizona State	12	–	6	.667	19	–	14	.576
USC	11	–	7	.611	17	–	11	.607
Washington	7	–	11	.389	16	–	15	.516
California	7	–	11	.389	14	–	14	.500
Stanford	6	–	12	.333	14	–	14	.500
Oregon	5	–	13	.278	9	–	18	.333
Arizona	1	–	17	.056	4	–	24	.143
As of April 15, 1983; Rankings from AP Poll

The 1982–83 Washington State Cougars men's basketball team represented Washington State University for the 1982–83 NCAA Division I men's basketball season. Led by eleventh-year head coach George Raveling, the Cougars were members of the Pacific-10 Conference and played their home games on campus at Beasley Coliseum in Pullman, Washington.

The Cougars were 22–6 overall in the regular season and 14–4 in conference play; runner-up to UCLA, who they split with in the season series. There was no conference tournament this season; it debuted four years later. They had a chance to tie the Bruins for the title, but lost by a point to rival Washington in Seattle to end the regular season.

After missing it the previous two seasons, WSU was invited to the 52-team NCAA tournament and were seeded eighth in the West region; they met ninth-seed Weber State, the Big Sky champion, in the first round in Boise. WSU's only two non-conference losses were to Big Sky teams, neighbor Idaho and Montana, on the road in December. The Cougars defeated Weber by ten points.

The next opponent was the top seed in the West, #4 Virginia with center Ralph Sampson, who had a first-round bye. The Cougars stayed with the Cavaliers, but lost by five points.

Washington State's 23–7 record was their best in 42 years, since the national runner-up team of 1941 went 26–6.

Raveling was the Pac-10 coach of the year and the national runner-up for AP coach of the year. In early April, he left Pullman to succeed Lute Olsen at Iowa in the Big Ten Conference; assistant Len Stevens was quickly promoted to head coach.

A third-round selection the 1983 NBA draft, senior guard/forward Craig Ehlo had a fourteen-year career in the NBA.

WSU's next NCAA appearance was eleven years away in 1994, under head coach Kelvin Sampson.

The court surface at Beasley Coliseum was tartan (polyurethane) for its first decade and this was its final season; a traditional hardwood floor debuted at the start of the next season.

== Postseason results ==
Date time, TV	Rank^{#}	Opponent^{#}	Result	Record	Site (attendance) city, state
Regular season
November 27, 1982*		at Wisconsin	W 66–64	1–0	UW Fieldhouse; Madison, Wisconsin
NCAA Tournament
Thu, March 17*; 6:10 pm, CBS	(8W)	vs. (9W) Weber State; First round	W 62–52	23–6	BSU Pavilion (11,200); Boise, Idaho
Sat, March 19*; 11:10 am, CBS	(8W)	vs. (1W) No. 4 Virginia; Second round	L 49–54	23–7	BSU Pavilion (12,177); Boise, Idaho
*Non-conference game. ^{#}Rankings from AP poll. (#) Tournament seedings in parentheses. All times are in Pacific time.
