= 1975–76 Washington State Cougars men's basketball team =

American college basketball season

1975–76 Washington State Cougars men's basketball
- Conference: Pacific-8
- Record: 18–8 (8–6 Pac-8)
- Head coach: George Raveling (4th season)
- Home arena: Performing Arts Coliseum

1975–76 Pacific-8 Conference men's basketball standings
	Conf.				Overall
Team	W		L	PCT	W		L	PCT
No. 5 UCLA	12	–	2	.857	27	–	5	.844
Oregon State	10	–	4	.714	18	–	9	.667
Oregon	10	–	4	.714	19	–	11	.633
Washington	9	–	5	.643	22	–	6	.786
Washington State	8	–	6	.571	18	–	8	.692
California	4	–	10	.286	12	–	14	.462
Stanford	3	–	11	.214	9	–	18	.333
USC	0	–	14	.000	11	–	16	.407
Rankings from AP Poll

The 1975–76 Washington State Cougars men's basketball team represented Washington State University for the 1975–76 NCAA Division I men's basketball season. Led by fourth-year head coach George Raveling, the Cougars were members of the Pacific-8 Conference and played their home games on campus at the Performing Arts Coliseum in Pullman, Washington.

The Cougars were 18–8 overall in the regular season and 8–6 in conference play, fifth in the standings; it was Washington State's first winning season in six years.

On Wednesday, January 21, WSU met Palouse neighbor Idaho in the inaugural varsity basketball game in the recently enclosed Kibbie Dome in Moscow. The festivities included an alumni game, featuring Idaho great Gus Johnson, won by Washington State. The varsity Cougars also won the main event, 84–67, before 6,449 spectators, which easily set a campus attendance record for basketball that stood for five years.
