= Brian Quinnett =

American basketball player

Personal information
- Born: May 30, 1966 (age 60) Pullman, Washington, U.S.
- Listed height: 6 ft 8 in (2.03 m)
- Listed weight: 235 lb (107 kg)

Career information
- High school: Cheney (Cheney, Washington)
- College: Washington State (1984–1989)
- NBA draft: 1989: 2nd round, 50th overall pick
- Drafted by: New York Knicks
- Playing career: 1989–1994
- Position: Small forward
- Number: 23

Career history
- 1989–1992: New York Knicks
- 1992: Dallas Mavericks
- 1992–1993: Yakima Sun Kings
- 1993: Juver Murcia
- 1993: Yakima Sun Kings
- 1993–1994: Tri-City Chinook
- 1994: Rapid City Thrillers
- Stats at NBA.com
- Stats at Basketball Reference

Brian Ralph Quinnett (born May 30, 1966) is an American former professional basketball player. A 6'8" small forward, Quinnett played three seasons in the National Basketball Association (NBA).

Upon graduation from Washington State University, Quinnett was selected by the New York Knicks in the second round (50th pick overall) of the 1989 NBA draft. He played mainly for the Knicks, and also had a brief 1991–92 stint with the Dallas Mavericks (traded for center James Donaldson). His best year as a professional was during the 1990–91 season, appearing in 68 games and averaging 4.7 ppg.

After leaving the NBA, Quinnett played briefly in the Continental Basketball Association (CBA) and also overseas for Spain's CB Murcia.
