= Steve Puidokas =

American basketball player

Personal information
- Born: April 12, 1955 Chicago, Illinois, U.S.
- Died: August 12, 1994 (aged 39) Sardinia, Italy
- Listed height: 6 ft 11 in (2.11 m)
- Listed weight: 265 lb (120 kg)

Career information
- High school: St. Laurence (Burbank, Illinois)
- College: Washington State (1973–1977)
- NBA draft: 1977: 3rd round, 57th overall pick
- Drafted by: Washington Bullets
- Position: Center

Career highlights
- 4× Second-team All-Pac-8 (1974–1977); No. 55 retired by Washington State Cougars; Third-team Parade All-American (1973)
- Stats at Basketball Reference

Steven John Puidokas (April 12, 1955 – August 12, 1994) was an American professional basketball player in Europe. He played college basketball for the Washington State Cougars from 1973 to 1977. He left Washington State as both their all-time leading scorer with 1,894 points and all-time leading rebounder with 992 rebounds. He was inducted posthumously into the Pac-12 Conference Men's Basketball Hall of Honor in 2012.

Puidokas was the first Washington State men's basketball player to have his number (55) retired, and remained the only one until the school retired Klay Thompson's in 2020.

As a high school player, Puidokas was named a third-team All-American by Parade Magazine in 1973.

== Personal life ==
In 1955, Steve Puidokas was born in a Lithuanian American family of John Julian Puidokas and Genovaitė Giedraitis in Chicago. Puidokas was married to an Italian woman and had five children. He died at the age of 39, because of problems with his heart while living in Sardinia, Italy.
