= 1959–60 Washington State Cougars men's basketball team =

American college basketball season

1959–60 Washington State Cougars men's basketball
- Conference: Independent
- Record: 13–13
- Head coach: Marv Harshman (2nd season)
- Home arena: Bohler Gymnasium

The 1959–60 Washington State Cougars men's basketball team represented Washington State University for the 1959–60 NCAA college basketball season. Led by second-year head coach Marv Harshman, the Cougars were an independent and played their home games on campus at Bohler Gymnasium in Pullman, Washington.

The Cougars were 13–13 overall in the regular season and dropped both campus games to rival Washington, but defeated the Huskies at the Spokane Coliseum.

The Pacific Coast Conference disbanded in the spring of 1959, and the successor Athletic Association of Western Universities (AAWU, Big Five) initially included the PCC's Southern Division and Washington. The other four teams of the Northern Division competed as independents for several years; all but Idaho eventually joined.

Washington State was 5–7 against the former Northern Division: Washington (1–2), Oregon (0–3), Oregon State (0–2), and Palouse neighbor Idaho (4–0).
