= 1961–62 Washington State Cougars men's basketball team =

American college basketball season

1961–62 Washington State Cougars men's basketball
- Conference: Independent
- Record: 8–18
- Head coach: Marv Harshman (4th season)
- Home arena: Bohler Gymnasium

The 1961–62 Washington State Cougars men's basketball team represented Washington State University for the 1961–62 NCAA college basketball season. Led by fourth-year head coach Marv Harshman, the Cougars were an independent and played their home games on campus at Bohler Gymnasium in Pullman, Washington.

The Cougars were 8–18 overall in the regular season, and dropped both games to rival Washington.

Washington State was 4–12 against the former Northern Division of the Pacific Coast Conference: Washington (0–2), Oregon (2–2), Oregon State (0–5), and Palouse neighbor Idaho (2–3).
