= 1977–78 Washington State Cougars men's basketball team =

American college basketball season

1977–78 Washington State Cougars men's basketball
- Conference: Pacific-8
- Record: 16–11 (7–7 Pac-8)
- Head coach: George Raveling (6th season)
- Home arena: Performing Arts Coliseum

1977–78 Pacific-8 Conference men's basketball standings
| | Conf. | | | | Overall |
| Team | W | | L | PCT | W | | L | PCT |
|---|---|---|---|---|---|---|---|---|
| No. 2 UCLA | 14 | – | 0 | 1.000 | 25 | – | 3 | .893 |
| Oregon State | 9 | – | 5 | .643 | 16 | – | 11 | .593 |
| Washington State | 7 | – | 7 | .500 | 16 | – | 11 | .593 |
| USC | 7 | – | 7 | .500 | 14 | – | 13 | .519 |
| Oregon | 6 | – | 8 | .429 | 16 | – | 11 | .593 |
| Washington | 6 | – | 8 | .429 | 14 | – | 13 | .519 |
| California | 4 | – | 10 | .286 | 11 | – | 16 | .407 |
| Stanford | 3 | – | 11 | .214 | 13 | – | 14 | .481 |
Rankings from AP Poll

The 1977–78 Washington State Cougars men's basketball team represented Washington State University for the 1977–78 NCAA Division I men's basketball season. Led by sixth-year head coach George Raveling, the Cougars were members of the Pacific-8 Conference and played their home games on campus at the Performing Arts Coliseum in Pullman, Washington.

The Cougars were 16–11 overall in the regular season and 7–7 in conference play, tied for third in the standings. During their final road trip, they lost twice by one point in Los Angeles to #4 UCLA and USC. WSU won their final three games, all at home, concluding with the rival Washington Huskies on Saturday night, with over 11,800 in attendance.
