= Len Stevens (basketball) =

American basketball coach (born 1942)

Biographical details
- Born: May 19, 1942 (age 84)

Playing career
- ?: Sacramento State

Coaching career (HC unless noted)
- ?: Jesuit HS (CA)
- 1978–1981: Saint Martin's
- 1981–1983: Washington State (assistant)
- 1983–1987: Washington State
- 1987–1993: Nevada
- c. 1998: UC Irvine (assistant)

Head coaching record
- Overall: 192–190 (college)

Len Stevens (born May 19, 1942) is a retired American college basketball coach. He was the head coach at St. Martin's College (1978–1981), Washington State University (1983–1987), and the University of Nevada (1987–1993).

Before St. Martin's in Lacey, Washington, Stevens was the head coach at Jesuit High School in Sacramento, California. He played college basketball at Sacramento State College, and was an assistant at Washington State for two seasons under George Raveling before becoming the head coach in 1983. After Nevada, he opened a restaurant in Reno, coached in Switzerland, and was an assistant coach at UC Irvine.

After coaching, Stevens was CEO of the chamber of commerce in Reno and retired in 2016.
