= 1963–64 Washington State Cougars men's basketball team =

American college basketball season

1963–64 Washington State Cougars men's basketball
- Conference: Athletic Association of Western Universities
- Record: 5–21 (2–13 AAWU, Big Six)
- Head coach: Marv Harshman (6th season)
- Home arena: Bohler Gymnasium

1963–64 AAWU Conference men's basketball standings
| | Conf. | | | | Overall |
| Team | W | | L | PCT | W | | L | PCT |
|---|---|---|---|---|---|---|---|---|
| No. 1 UCLA | 15 | – | 0 | 1.000 | 30 | – | 0 | 1.000 |
| Stanford | 9 | – | 6 | .600 | 15 | – | 10 | .600 |
| California | 8 | – | 7 | .533 | 13 | – | 14 | .481 |
| USC | 6 | – | 9 | .400 | 10 | – | 16 | .385 |
| Washington | 5 | – | 10 | .333 | 9 | – | 17 | .346 |
| Washington State | 2 | – | 13 | .133 | 5 | – | 21 | .192 |
Rankings from AP Poll

The 1963–64 Washington State Cougars men's basketball team represented Washington State University for the 1963–64 NCAA college basketball season. Led by sixth-year head coach Marv Harshman, the Cougars were members of the Athletic Association of Western Universities (AAWU, Big Six) and played their home games on campus at Bohler Gymnasium in Pullman, Washington.

The Cougars were 5–21 overall in the regular season and 2–13 in conference play, last in the standings.
