= George Raveling =

American basketball coach and announcer (1937–2025)

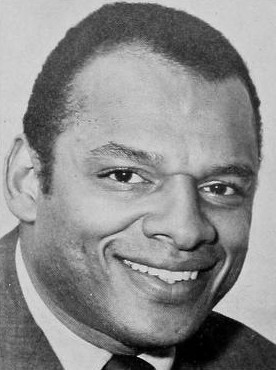
- Raveling, circa 1971

Biographical details
- Born: June 27, 1937; Washington, D.C., U.S.
- Died: September 1, 2025 (aged 88)

Playing career
- 1957–1960: Villanova

Coaching career (HC unless noted)
- 1963–1969: Villanova (assistant)
- 1969–1972: Maryland (assistant)
- 1972–1983: Washington State
- 1983–1986: Iowa
- 1986–1994: USC

Head coaching record
- Overall: 336–292 (.535)
- Tournaments: 2–6 (NCAA Division I); 2–2 (NIT)

Accomplishments and honors

Awards
- NABC Coach of the Year (1992); 3× Pac-10 Coach of the Year (1976, 1983, 1992); John Bunn Award (2013)
- Basketball Hall of Fame; Inducted in 2015 (profile)
- College Basketball Hall of Fame; Inducted in 2013
Medal record
Assistant Coach for the United States
Men's national basketball team
Olympic Games
Gold medal – first place	1984 Los Angeles	Team
Bronze medal – third place	1988 Seoul	Team

George Henry Raveling (June 27, 1937 – September 1, 2025) was an American college basketball player and coach. He played for the Villanova Wildcats, and was the men's head coach for the Washington State Cougars (1972‍–‍1983), Iowa Hawkeyes (1983‍–‍1986), and USC Trojans (1986‍–‍1994). He is a member of the Naismith Memorial Basketball Hall of Fame.

== Early life ==
Raveling was born in a segregated hospital in Washington, D.C. on June 27, 1937. He was raised in Washington, D.C. and did not play basketball until he was in ninth grade. He was enrolled at St. Michael's, a Catholic boarding school in Hoban Heights, Pennsylvania; it was founded as an orphanage in 1916 near Scranton and closed in 2010. His grandmother's employer helped him enroll and he converted to Catholicism while a student there. Raveling's father died when he was 9 and his mother was institutionalized when he was 13, so academics became among the most influential forces in his life.

== College and early career ==
Raveling attended college at Villanova University near Philadelphia and played basketball for the Wildcats. An outstanding rebounder, he set school single game and season rebounding records in his time. Raveling was team captain in his senior season, featured on the cover of the 1960 media guide, and led the Wildcats to consecutive appearances in the National Invitation Tournament (NIT) in 1959 and 1960. The Philadelphia Warriors selected him in the eighth round (pick 7) of the 1960 NBA draft.

Raveling became an assistant coach at his alma mater Villanova, then moved to Maryland in 1969 on the staff of new head coach Lefty Driesell. At College Park, he became the first African American coach in the Atlantic Coast Conference (ACC).

=== March on Washington with Martin Luther King Jr., 1963 ===
On August 28, 1963, as Martin Luther King Jr. waved goodbye to an audience of over 250,000 "March on Washington" participants, Raveling asked King if he could have the speech. King handed Raveling the original typewritten "I Have a Dream" pages. Raveling was on the podium with King at that moment, having volunteered to provide security. He kept the original, and had been offered more than three million dollars for the speech in 2013. He declined the offer. In 2021, he selected Villanova University to be the new steward of the speech. The document was loaned to the National Museum of African American History and Culture in Washington, D.C., as part of a long-term arrangement, where it is on rotational display.

== Head coaching career ==
=== Washington State (1972–1983) ===
Hired in Pullman in April 1972, Raveling was the first African-American basketball coach in the Pacific-8 Conference (Pac-8, now Pac-12). He guided the Washington State Cougars from 1972‍–‍1983 with two NCAA tournament appearances during his eleven years. The first was in 1980 and marked the first time WSU was included in the NCAA bracket since the runner-up finish in 1941; the second was three years later in 1983. Raveling was one of the winningest coaches in Washington State basketball history, with a 167–136 (.551) record and seven winning seasons, including five straight from the 1975–76 campaign through the 1980 season. Upon his death, Raveling was characterized as a transformative figure in his time at Washington State, bringing an ACC professionalism to the school's basketball program and turning its recruiting outlook from regional to national.

While with the Cougars, Raveling was the UPI Pac-8 coach of the year twice (1976 (shared), 1983), and was the national runner-up for AP coach of the year in 1983. He was honored by WSU with his induction into the WSU Athletics Hall of Fame and Pac-12 Hall of Honor in 2004. In February 2020, Washington State held a halftime ceremony with Raveling in attendance and raised his name on a banner to hang above the court as one of the legends of the program.

=== Iowa (1983–1986) ===
Raveling succeeded Lute Olson as head coach at the University of Iowa in April 1983, and guided the Hawkeyes to consecutive 20-win seasons and NCAA tournament berths in 1985 and 1986.

During his three years at Iowa, Raveling is probably best known for his recruits and outstanding players, including B. J. Armstrong, Kevin Gamble, Ed Horton, Roy Marble, and Greg Stokes, all of whom went on to play in the NBA.

=== USC (1986–1994) ===
==== Revocation of scholarships ====
In 1986, the University of Southern California hired Raveling as the next head coach of the Trojans.

The previous season, Hank Gathers and Bo Kimble were recruited to USC by former head coach Stan Morrison and his top assistant, David Spencer. They were joined by high school All-American, Tom Lewis, and Rich Grande as the "Four Freshmen" star recruiting class.

After Morrison's firing, it was reported that the players would not remain unless certain conditions were met, including having a say in the next coaching staff. Raveling gave the players a deadline to respond whether they would remain on the team. When they did not respond, he revoked the scholarships of Gathers, Kimble, and Lewis. Raveling's controversial statement was, "You can't let the Indians run the reservation," he said. "You've got to be strong, too. Sometimes you have to tell them that they have to exit." Kimble and Gathers transferred together from USC to Loyola Marymount. Lewis transferred to Pepperdine. Grande remained at USC.

==== Later tenure ====
During Raveling's career at USC, the Trojans advanced to the NCAA tournament in 1991 and 1992 and competed in the NIT in 1993 and 1994.

Raveling was named Kodak National Coach of the Year (1992), Basketball Weekly Coach of the Year (1992), Black Coaches Association Coach of the Year (1992) and CBS/Chevrolet National Coach of the Year (1994).

==== Car crash and retirement ====
On the morning of September 25, 1994, Raveling's Jeep was blindsided in a two-car collision in Los Angeles. He was seriously injured, suffering nine broken ribs, a fractured pelvis and clavicle, and a collapsed lung. He was in intensive care due to bleeding in his chest cavity for two weeks. Citing the automobile crash and planned lengthy rehabilitation, he retired as head coach of USC at the age of 57 on November 14.

== Team USA coaching career ==
While at WSU, Raveling was an assistant coach for the USA team at the Pan American Games in 1979 (under head coach Bob Knight) and the West Regional coach at the 1979 U.S. Olympic Sports Festival.

At the Olympics in 1984 in Los Angeles, he served as the assistant coach for the USA team, composed of collegians. He again served as assistant coach at the 1988 Olympics.

== Post-coaching ==
Raveling authored two books on rebounding drills, War on the Boards and A Rebounder's Workshop. He served as a color commentator for CBS Sports and FOX Sports.

Raveling served as Nike's global basketball sports marketing director from 1994 until his death. According to The New York Times, Raveling was instrumental in convincing Michael Jordan to sign with Nike in 1984, and the Air Jordan brand was born as a result of that partnership.

On September 8, 2018, he was selected by former University of Maryland head basketball coach Lefty Driesell as one of Driesell's presenters upon his induction into the Naismith Hall of Fame.

Raveling died on September 1, 2025, at the age of 88 from cancer.

== Awards ==
In 2013, he received the John W. Bunn Lifetime Achievement Award by the Naismith Memorial Basketball Hall of Fame.

On November 21, 2013, he was a recipient of the Lapchick Award (in memory of Joe Lapchick, St. John's basketball coach), together with Don Haskins and Theresa Grentz.

Raveling was inducted into the College Basketball Hall of Fame in 2013.

On February 14, 2015, it was announced that George Raveling would be inducted into the Naismith Memorial Basketball Hall of Fame when he was selected for direct election by the Contributor Direct Election Committee.

== In popular media ==
In 2023, Ben Affleck and Matt Damon produced a film called Air about Nike's signing of Michael Jordan and ultimately the Air Jordan brand. Marlon Wayans plays Raveling in the film.

== Head coaching record ==
Record table
Season	Team	Overall	Conference	Standing	Postseason
Washington State Cougars (Pacific-8 / 10 Conference) (1972–1983)
1972–73	Washington State	6–20	2–12	8th	
1973–74	Washington State	8–21	3–11	T–7th	
1974–75	Washington State	10–16	1–13	8th	
1975–76	Washington State	19–7	9–5	4th	
1976–77	Washington State	19–8	8–6	T–3rd	
1977–78	Washington State	16–11	7–7	T–3rd	
1978–79	Washington State	18–9	10–8	T–4th	
1979–80	Washington State	22–6	14–4	3rd	NCAA Division I first round
1980–81	Washington State	10–17	3–15	10th	
1981–82	Washington State	16–14	10–8	5th	
1982–83	Washington State	23–7	14–4	3rd	NCAA Division I second round
Washington State:		167–136 (.551)	76–66 (.535)		
Iowa Hawkeyes (Big Ten Conference) (1984–1986)
1983–84	Iowa	13–15	6–12	T–7th	
1984–85	Iowa	21–11	10–8	5th	NCAA Division I first round
1985–86	Iowa	20–12	10–8	6th	NCAA Division I first round
Iowa:		54–38 (.587)	26–28 (.481)		
USC Trojans (Pacific-10 Conference) (1987–1994)
1986–87	USC	9–19	4–14	10th	
1987–88	USC	7–21	5–13	T–8th	
1988–89	USC	10–22	2–16	10th	
1989–90	USC	12–16	6–12	T–7th	
1990–91	USC	19–10	10–8	T–3rd	NCAA Division I first round
1991–92	USC	24–6	15–3	2nd	NCAA Division I second round
1992–93	USC	18–12	9–9	T–5th	NIT Quarterfinal
1993–94	USC	16–12	9–9	7th	NIT first round
USC:		115–118 (.494)	55–70 (.440)		
Total:		336–292 (.535)			

== Bibliography ==
- Raveling, George (1992). A Rebounder's Workshop: A Drill Manual on Rebounding. Sysco's Sports Books. OCLC 38248302.
- Raveling, George (2017). War on the Boards: A Rebounding Manual. CreateSpace Independent Publishing Platform. ISBN 978-1539629276.
- Raveling, George; Holiday, Ryan (2025). What You're Made For: Powerful Life Lessons from My Career in Sports. Penguin. ISBN 978-0593852972.
