= USC Trojans men's basketball statistical leaders =

The USC Trojans men's basketball statistical leaders are individual statistical leaders of the USC Trojans men's basketball program in various categories, including points, assists, blocks, rebounds, and steals. Within those areas, the lists identify single-game, single-season, and career leaders. As of the next college basketball season in 2024–25, the Trojans represent the University of Southern California in the NCAA Division I Big Ten Conference.

USC began competing in intercollegiate basketball in 1906. However, the school's record book does not generally list records from before the 1950s, as records from before this period are often incomplete and inconsistent. Since scoring was much lower in this era, and teams played much fewer games during a typical season, it is likely that few or no players from this era would appear on these lists anyway.

The NCAA did not officially record assists as a stat until the 1983–84 season, and blocks and steals until the 1985–86 season, but USC's record books includes players in these stats before these seasons. These lists are updated through the end of the 2020–21 season.

== Scoring ==
Career
Rk	Player	Points	Seasons
1	Harold Miner	2,048	1989–90 1990–91 1991–92
2	Ronnie Coleman	1,727	1987–88 1988–89 1989–90 1990–91
3	Sam Clancy	1,657	1998–99 1999–00 2000–01 2001–02
4	Jordan McLaughlin	1,648	2014–15 2015–16 2016–17 2017–18
5	Desmon Farmer	1,606	2000–01 2001–02 2002–03 2003–04
6	Bennie Boatwright	1,542	2015–16 2016–17 2017–18 2018–19
7	Wayne Carlander	1,524	1981–82 1982–83 1983–84 1984–85
8	Nick Young	1,486	2004–05 2005–06 2006–07
9	John Rudometkin	1,484	1959–60 1960–61 1961–62
10	Derrick Dowell	1,483	1983–84 1984–85 1985–86 1986–87

Season
Rk	Player	Points	Season
1	Harold Miner	789	1991–92
2	O. J. Mayo	684	2007–08
3	Harold Miner	681	1990–91
4	John Block	654	1965–66
5	Nick Young	647	2006–07
6	John Rudometkin	645	1960–61
7	Sam Clancy	611	2001–02
8	Sam Clancy	588	2000–01
9	Derrick Dowell	585	1986–87
10	Boogie Ellis	583	2022–23

Single game
Rk	Player	Points	Season	Opponent
1	John Block	45	1965–66	Washington
2	John Block	44	1965–66	Oregon
3	Harold Miner	43	1991–92	Nebraska
4	Dennis Layton	41	1969–70	Arizona State
5	John Rudometkin	40	1961–62	Hawaii
	Desmon Farmer	40	2003–04	Arizona
7	Bill Hewitt	39	1966–67	UCLA
	Cliff Robinson	39	1977–78	California
	Harold Miner	39	1991–92	Arizona State
10	Wayne Carlander	38	1984–85	UCLA

== Rebounds ==
Career
Rk	Player	Rebounds	Seasons
1	Ron Riley	1,067	1969–70 1970–71 1971–72
2	Nick Rakocevic	923	2016–17 2017–18 2018–19 2019–20
3	Taj Gibson	896	2006–07 2007–08 2008–09
4	Sam Clancy	839	1998–99 1999–00 2000–01 2001–02
5	John Rudometkin	831	1959–60 1960–61 1961–62
6	Allen Young	822	1962–63 1963–64 1964–65
7	Ronnie Coleman	821	1987–88 1988–89 1989–90 1990–91
8	Derrick Dowell	806	1983–84 1984–85 1985–86 1986–87
9	Roy Irvin	768	1952–53 1953–54 1954–55
10	Wayne Carlander	767	1981–82 1982–83 1983–84 1984–85

Season
Rk	Player	Rebounds	Season
1	Ron Riley	398	1970–71
2	Ron Riley	369	1971–72
3	Nikola Vucevic	350	2010–11
4	John Rudometkin	325	1960–61
5	Roy Irvin	322	1954–55
6	Taj Gibson	321	2006–07
7	Taj Gibson	316	2008–09
8	Alex Stepheson	313	2010–11
9	Nick Rakocevic	308	2018–19
10	Bill Hewitt	306	1967–68

Single game
Rk	Player	Rebounds	Season	Opponent
1	David Bluthenthal	28	1999–00	ASU
	Cliff Robinson	28	1977–78	Portland St.
3	Ron Riley	25	1971–72	WSU
4	Ron Riley	23	1970–71	Oregon St.
5	Ron Riley	22	1971–72	UCLA
	Ron Riley	22	1970–71	ASU

== Assists ==
Career
Rk	Player	Assists	Seasons
1	Brandon Granville	779	1998–99 1999–00 2000–01 2001–02
2	Jordan McLaughlin	738	2014–15 2015–16 2016–17 2017–18
3	Larry Friend	409	1982–83 1983–84 1984–85 1985–86
4	Duane Cooper	398	1987–88 1988–89 1990–91 1991–92
	Julian Jacobs	398	2013–14 2014–15 2015–16
6	Jacque Hill	389	1979–80 1980–81 1981–82 1982–83
7	Daniel Hackett	363	2006–07 2007–08 2008–09
8	Gus Williams	362	1972–73 1973–74 1974–75
9	Drew Peterson	344	2020–21 2021–22 2022–23
10	Robert Pack	319	1989–90 1990–91

Season
Rk	Player	Assists	Season
1	Jordan McLaughlin	281	2017–18
2	Brandon Granville	248	1999–00
3	Brandon Granville	207	2000–01
4	Jordan McLaughlin	197	2016–17
5	Brandon Granville	184	2001–02
6	Larry Friend	176	1984–85
7	Julian Jacobs	169	2015–16
8	Jio Fontan	168	2012–13
9	Daniel Hackett	166	2008–09
10	Robert Pack	165	1989–90

Single game
Rk	Player	Assists	Season	Opponent
1	Jordan McLaughlin	19	2017–18	UCSB
2	Jordan McLaughlin	16	2015–16	Lafayette
3	Brandon Granville	15	1999–00	Memphis
4	Stais Boseman	14	1995–96	Geo. Mason
	Larry Friend	14	1985–86	Texas
	Jordan McLaughlin	14	2017–18	WKU
7	Daniel Hackett	13	2008–09	Oklahoma
	Larry Friend	13	1984–85	ASU
	Casey Jones	13	1976–77	Baylor
	Julian Jacobs	13	2015–16	Cal Poly
	Jordan McLaughlin	13	2017–18	UNCA

== Steals ==
Career
Rk	Player	Steals	Seasons
1	Brandon Granville	229	1998–99 1999–00 2000–01 2001–02
2	Errick Craven	224	2001–02 2002–03 2003–04 2004–05
3	Jordan McLaughlin	213	2014–15 2015–16 2016–17 2017–18
4	Stais Boseman	208	1993–94 1994–95 1995–96 1996–97
5	Jeff Trepagnier	204	1997–98 1998–99 1999–00 2000–01
6	Derrick Dowell	179	1983–84 1984–85 1985–86 1986–87
7	Gabe Pruitt	158	2004–05 2005–06 2006–07
8	Kobe Johnson	156	2021–22 2022–23 2023–24
9	Lodrick Stewart	148	2003–04 2004–05 2005–06 2006–07
10	Jonah Mathews	135	2016–17 2017–18 2018–19 2019–20

Season
Rk	Player	Steals	Season
1	Jeff Trepagnier	94	1999–00
2	Errick Craven	73	2002–03
3	Jordan McLaughlin	72	2017–18
	Kobe Johnson	72	2022–23
5	Maurice Jones	69	2010–11
	De'Anthony Melton	69	2016–17
7	Errick Craven	68	2001–02
	Kobe Johnson	68	2023–24
9	Derrick Dowell	62	1986–87
	Brandon Granville	62	1999–00
	Errick Craven	62	2003–04

Single game
Rk	Player	Steals	Season	Opponent
1	Jeff Trepagnier	10	1999–00	Utah St.
2	Errick Craven	8	2002–03	Oregon
	Jeff Trepagnier	8	1998–99	LMU
4	Pe'Shon Howard	7	2013–14	Stanford
	Gabe Pruitt	7	2005–06	Arizona
	Errick Craven	7	2001–02	Oregon St.
	Jeff Trepagnier	7	1999–00	Washington
	Cameron Murray	7	1994–95	CS Sac
	Julian Jacobs	7	2015–16	Arizona
	Boogie Ellis	7	2022–23	Alabama State

== Blocks ==
Career
Rk	Player	Blocks	Seasons
1	Taj Gibson	253	2006–07 2007–08 2008–09
2	Sam Clancy	195	1998–99 1999–00 2000–01 2001–02
3	Chimezie Metu	168	2015–16 2016–17 2017–18
4	Joshua Morgan	163	2020–21 2021–22 2022–23 2023–24
5	Rory O’Neil	129	2001–02 2002–03 2003–04 2004–05
6	Lorenzo Orr	128	1991–92 1992–93 1993–94 1994–95
7	Elijah Stewart	126	2014–15 2015–16 2016–17 2017–18
8	Omar Oraby	119	2012–13 2013–14
	Nick Rakocevic	119	2016–17 2017–18 2018–19 2019–20
10	Rod Keller	116	1983–84 1984–85 1985–86 1986–87

Season
Rk	Player	Blocks	Season
1	Taj Gibson	100	2008–09
2	Evan Mobley	95	2020–21
3	Taj Gibson	84	2007–08
4	Sam Clancy	81	2000–01
5	Onyeka Okongwu	76	2019–20
6	Omar Oraby	72	2013–14
	Avondre Jones	72	1995–96
8	Joshua Morgan	71	2023–24
9	Taj Gibson	69	2006–07
10	Dewayne Dedmon	66	2012–13

Single game
Rk	Player	Blocks	Season	Opponent
1	Joshua Morgan	10	2023–24	Seton Hall
2	Onyeka Okongwu	8	2019–20	Florida A&M
	Avondre Jones	8	1995–96	Rhode Island
	Gerry Wright	8	1982–83	Santa Clara
	Steve Malovic	8	1975–76	Howard
6	Sam Clancy	7	2000–01	California
	Avondre Jones	7	1995–96	Geo. Mason
	Taj Gibson	7	2006–07	Oregon
	Alex Stepheson	7	2009–10	Sac. St
	Onyeka Okongwu	7	2019–20	TCU
	Joshua Morgan	7	2022–23	Florida Gulf Coast
	Joshua Morgan	7	2022–23	California
