= 2001–02 USC Trojans men's basketball team =

American college basketball season

2001–02 USC Trojans men's basketball

NCAA tournament, first round
- Conference: Pacific-10 Conference

Ranking
- AP: No. 18
- Record: 22–10 (12–6 Pac-10)
- Head coach: Henry Bibby (6th season)
- Home arena: L. A. Sports Arena

2001–02 Pacific-10 Conference men's basketball standings
	Conf.				Overall
Team	W		L	PCT	W		L	PCT
No. 6 Oregon	14	–	4	.778	26	–	9	.743
California	12	–	6	.667	23	–	9	.719
No. 10 Arizona†	12	–	6	.667	24	–	10	.706
No. 18 USC	12	–	6	.667	22	–	10	.688
Stanford	12	–	6	.667	20	–	10	.667
No. 20 UCLA	11	–	7	.611	21	–	12	.636
Arizona State	7	–	11	.389	12	–	15	.444
Washington	5	–	13	.278	11	–	17	.393
Oregon State	4	–	14	.222	11	–	17	.393
Washington State	1	–	17	.056	6	–	21	.222
† Conference tournament winner As of July 10, 2011; Rankings from Coaches Poll

The 2001–02 USC Trojans men's basketball team represented the University of Southern California during the 2001–02 NCAA Division I men's basketball season. Led by head coach Henry Bibby, they played their home games at the L. A. Sports Arena in Los Angeles, California as members of the Pac-10 Conference. The Trojans finished the season with a record of 22–10 (12–6 Pac-10, 2nd) and made the NCAA tournament.

== Roster ==
2001–02 USC Trojans men's basketball team
Players
Coaches

Pos.	#	Name	Height	Weight	Year	Previous school	Hometown
G	5	Brandon Granville	5 ft 9 in (1.75 m)	—	Sr
G	22	Errick Craven	6 ft 2 in (1.88 m)	195 lb (88 kg)	So	Bishop Montgomery	Carson, California
G	33	Desmon Farmer	6 ft 5 in (1.96 m)	210 lb (95 kg)	So	Northwestern	Flint, Michigan
F/C	50	Sam Clancy	6 ft 7 in (2.01 m)	250 lb (113 kg)	Sr	St. Edward	Lakewood, Ohio

Head coach

- Henry Bibby (UCLA)

Assistant coach(es)

Legend

- (C) Team captain
- (S) Suspended
- (I) Ineligible
- (W) Walk-on
- Injured
- Current redshirt

== Schedule and results ==
Date time, TV	Rank^{#}	Opponent^{#}	Result	Record	Site (attendance) city, state
Non-conference regular season
Nov 13, 2001*	No. 20	Wyoming	W 68–55	1–0	L.A. Sports Arena; Los Angeles, California
Nov 15, 2001*	No. 20	at Fresno State	L 58–65	1–1	Selland Arena; Fresno, California
Nov 26, 2001*	No. 24	UC Santa Barbara	W 73–62	2–1	L.A. Sports Arena; Los Angeles, California
Dec 1, 2001*		at Bradley	W 60–50	3–1	Carver Arena; Peoria, Illinois
Dec 4, 2001*		Rhode Island	W 82–54	4–1	L.A. Sports Arena; Los Angeles, California
Dec 6, 2001*		vs. Pepperdine	L 77–78	4–2	The Forum; Inglewood, California
Dec 12, 2001*		at Long Beach State	W 86–68	5–2	The Walter Pyramid; Long Beach, California
Dec 16, 2001*		Miami (OH)	W 59–55	6–2	L.A. Sports Arena; Los Angeles, California
Dec 20, 2001*		at San Diego	W 71–67 ^{OT}	7–2	Jenny Craig Pavilion; San Diego, California
Dec 22, 2001*		at Loyola Marymount	W 81–67	8–2	Gersten Pavilion; Los Angeles, California
Pac-10 regular season
Dec 27, 2001		at Washington	W 87–65	9–2 (1–0)	Bank of America Arena; Seattle, Washington
Dec 29, 2001		at Washington State	W 78–63	10–2 (2–0)	Friel Court; Pullman, Washington
Jan 4, 2002		Washington State	W 85–64	11–2 (3–0)	L.A. Sports Arena; Los Angeles, California
Jan 6, 2002		Washington	W 94–74	12–2 (4–0)	L.A. Sports Arena; Los Angeles, California
Jan 10, 2002		No. 11 UCLA	W 81–77	13–2 (5–0)	L.A. Sports Arena; Los Angeles, California
Jan 17, 2002	No. 18	at No. 15 Arizona	L 80–97	13–3 (5–1)	McKale Center; Tucson, Arizona
Jan 19, 2002	No. 18	at Arizona State	W 81–73	14–3 (6–1)	Desert Financial Arena; Tempe, Arizona
Jan 24, 2002	No. 23	California	L 91–92 ^{OT}	14–4 (6–2)	L.A. Sports Arena; Los Angeles, California
Jan 26, 2002	No. 23	No. 17 Stanford	W 90–82	15–4 (7–2)	L.A. Sports Arena; Los Angeles, California
Jan 31, 2002	No. 23	at Oregon State	W 64–51	16–4 (8–2)	Gill Coliseum; Corvallis, Oregon
Feb 2, 2002	No. 23	at Oregon	L 69–73	16–5 (8–3)	McArthur Court; Eugene, Oregon
Feb 6, 2002	No. 25	at No. 15 UCLA	L 65–67	16–6 (8–4)	Pauley Pavilion; Los Angeles, California
Feb 14, 2002	No. 25	Arizona State	W 83–61	17–6 (9–4)	L.A. Sports Arena; Los Angeles, California
Feb 16, 2002	No. 25	No. 9 Arizona	W 94–89	18–6 (10–4)	L.A. Sports Arena; Los Angeles, California
Feb 21, 2002	No. 20	at No. 10 Stanford	W 77–58	19–6 (11–4)	Maples Pavilion; Stanford, California
Feb 23, 2002	No. 20	at California	L 64–83	19–7 (11–5)	Haas Pavilion; Berkeley, California
Feb 28, 2002	No. 19	No. 13 Oregon	L 65–67	19–8 (11–6)	L.A. Sports Arena; Los Angeles, California
Mar 2, 2002	No. 19	Oregon State	W 79–45	20–8 (12–6)	L.A. Sports Arena; Los Angeles, California
Pac-10 Tournament
Mar 7, 2002*	No. 22	No. 16 Stanford; Quarterfinals	W 103–78	21–8	The Forum; Inglewood, California
Mar 8, 2002*	No. 22	No. 9 Oregon; Semifinals	W 89–78	22–8	The Forum; Inglewood, California
Mar 9, 2002*	No. 22	at No. 15 Arizona; Championship game	L 71–81	22–9	The Forum; Inglewood, California
NCAA Tournament
Mar 14, 2002*	(4 W) No. 18	vs. (13 W) UNC Wilmington; First Round	L 89–93 ^{OT}	22–10	ARCO Arena; Sacramento, California
*Non-conference game. ^{#}Rankings from AP Poll. (#) Tournament seedings in parentheses. S=South. All times are in Pacific Time.
