= Negrini =

Negrini is an Italian surname. Notable people with the surname include:

- Alessandra Negrini (born 1970), Brazilian actress
- Antonio Negrini (1903–1994), Italian cyclist
- Carlo Negrini (1826–1865), Italian opera singer
- Chiara Negrini (born 1979), Italian volleyball player
- Clare Negrini
- Claudiomiro Negrini (born 1967), Brazilian footballer
- Gualtiero Negrini (born 1961), American opera singer
- Luciano Negrini (1920–2012), Italian rower
- Matteo Negrini (born 1982), Italian footballer
- Vincenzo Negrini (1804–1840), Italian opera singer

== See also ==
- Nigrini
