= Daniel Murphy High School =

Coordinates: 34.069229°N 118.345308°W

Location
- 241 South Detroit Street; Los Angeles, California, California 90036; United States

Information
- Type: Private, All-Male
- Motto: A Murphy man, is a Noble man = Real Nobles have pride
- Religious affiliations: Roman Catholic; Dominican (1956-1981)
- Opened: 1954
- Status: Closed
- Closed: 2008
- Grades: 9–12
- Enrollment: 279 (2006)
- Campus type: Urban
- Colors: Maroon and Gray
- Team name: Nobles
- Yearbook: Calarogan
- Website: www.NobleAlumni.com

Daniel Murphy High School was a Catholic all-boys high school located in Los Angeles, California. It was located in the Archdiocese of Los Angeles.

== History ==
Daniel Murphy High School was originally the home of Los Angeles College, a Catholic junior seminary. A notable alumnus of Los Angeles College is Cardinal Roger Mahony. The seminary existed on the site from the time it was built in 1926 until 1953 when it moved to its new home in the San Fernando Valley and was renamed Our Lady Queen of Angels Seminary. Today the Daniel Murphy campus is the home of the Yeshiva Aharon Yaakov School.

In 1954, the site was transformed into a high school and was named St. John Vianney High School after the French priest known as the patron saint of parish priests. In 1956, the school came under the operation of the Dominicans. Because of seismic concerns, a new building was constructed adjacent to the original building. In 1966, once construction of the new building was completed, the original building was demolished. St. John Vianney Chapel was the only original building left from when the grounds were used as seminary.

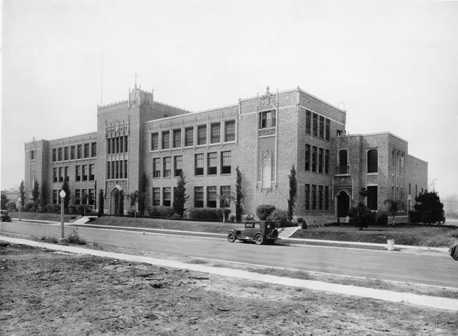
Los Angeles College, c. 1926. St. John Vianney Chapel is far right.

During this time the school was renamed in honor of Daniel Murphy, a businessman and civic leader whose foundation made generous financial contributions to fund the construction of the new building. In 1981, operation was transferred to the Archdiocese of Los Angeles.

Daniel Murphy enjoyed a long-standing tradition as the primary Los Angeles rival to Loyola High School, the Jesuit all-boy high school in Harvard Heights, Los Angeles. The rivalry between the two schools, although good-natured, at times became heated.

== Controversy and closure ==
In October 2007, it was announced that the school would close at the end of the 2007–2008 academic year due to declining enrollment.

Parents, students, faculty and alumni felt otherwise. The timing of the closure coincided with the archdiocese's payoff of a $660 million settlement to abuse victims. The archdiocese claimed the closure had nothing to do with the settlement and that the decision was based solely on the low enrollment. The archdiocese claimed it could no longer afford to provide financial subsidization to the school. The parents proposed to pay an additional $1,000 per year in tuition which, they contended, would have exceeded any amount the archdiocese had ever had to spend to keep the school in the black. However, the archdiocese said the decision to close the school was "irrevocable". The Alumni Association and parent's group joined forces and fought to keep the school open. The archdiocese held one meeting but otherwise ignored all requests to meet and discuss the closure.

Daniel Murphy's final graduation commencement ceremony was held on May 30, 2008. The last school day was June 6, 2008. The archdiocese had not announced definitive plans for the campus in its initial closing announcement, but subsequently it said that the 2 1/2-acre school site would be sold.

After 72 years, St. John Vianney Chapel closed in 2009. Murphy's last principal, Sharon Dandorf, as well as many Murphy alumni were in attendance.

In April 2009, The Jewish Journal of Greater Los Angeles reported that the campus, located in the heart of the heavily Orthodox Jewish Fairfax District, had been sold to Yeshiva Aharon Yaakov-Ohr Eliyahu, an Orthodox day school currently located in Culver City.

== Athletics ==
The Nobles competed in the Del Rey League of the CIF Southern Section. Some opponents were St. Anthony's High School, Salesian High School, and Serra High School. The Nobles were Southern Section basketball champions in 1972 (Division 2-A), 1973 (Division 3-A) and 1986 (Division 2-A). They won the CIF Southern Section championship in 1986.

== Notable alumni ==
- Kenya Barris, writer, producer, director, actor. Creator of television show Black-ish
- Bob Lutz (Vianney '65), tennis player
- Roger Mahony, cardinal
- A Martínez, journalist
- Gualtiero Negrini, opera tenor
- Harry Nilsson: singer songwriter attended St. John Vianney
- Bernard Parks, Los Angeles city councilman and the former chief of police of the Los Angeles Police Department
- Danny Ragsdale, American football player
- Francis St. Paul, professional football player
- Alexander Salazar, auxiliary bishop in the Los Angeles Archdiocese
- Brad Wright, former professional basketball player

== Notable faculty ==
- Dave Trembley (baseball coach at Murphy), former manager of the Baltimore Orioles
