= 1984–85 Arizona Wildcats men's basketball team =

American college basketball season

1984–85 Arizona Wildcats men's basketball

NCAA tournament, First round
- Conference: Pacific-10
- Record: 21–10 (12–6 Pac-10)
- Head coach: Lute Olson (2nd season)
- Assistant coaches: Ricky Byrdsong (3rd season); Rich Glas (1st season); Scott Thompson (2nd season)
- Home arena: McKale Center (Capacity: 14,545)

1984–85 Pacific-10 Conference men's basketball standings
	Conf.				Overall
Team	W		L	PCT	W		L	PCT
Washington	13	–	5	.722	22	–	10	.688
USC	13	–	5	.722	19	–	10	.655
Oregon State	12	–	6	.667	22	–	9	.710
Arizona	12	–	6	.667	21	–	10	.677
UCLA	12	–	6	.667	21	–	12	.636
Oregon	8	–	10	.444	15	–	16	.484
Arizona State	7	–	11	.389	12	–	16	.429
Washington State	5	–	13	.278	13	–	15	.464
California	5	–	13	.278	13	–	15	.464
Stanford	3	–	15	.167	11	–	17	.393
As of November 25, 2011; Rankings from AP Poll

The 1984–85 Arizona Wildcats men's basketball team represented the University of Arizona during the 1984–85 NCAA Division I men's basketball season. The team was led by second-year head coach Lute Olson. The Wildcats played its home games in the McKale Center in Tucson, Arizona, and were a member of the Pacific-10 Conference. Arizona finished with an overall record of 21–10 (12–6 Pac-10) and reached the NCAA tournament, but lost in the opening round.

== Roster ==
1984–85 Arizona Wildcats men's basketball team
Players
Coaches

Pos.	#	Name	Height	Weight	Year	Previous school	Hometown
G	10	Brock Brunkhorst	6 ft 2 in (1.88 m)	—	Sr	East HS	Phoenix, AZ
G	11	Michael Tait	6 ft 2 in (1.88 m)	—	So	St. John Bosco HS	Compton, CA
G	13	Rolf Jacobs	6 ft 7 in (2.01 m)	—	Fr	Fountain Valley HS	Fountain Valley, CA
F	14	Eddie Smith	6 ft 7 in (2.01 m)	—	Sr	Wichita West HS	Wichita, KS
G	20	Craig McMillan	6 ft 6 in (1.98 m)	—	Fr	Cloverdale HS	Cloverdale, CA
F	21	Keith Jackson	6 ft 5 in (1.96 m)	—	Sr	Willow Run HS	Ypsilanti, MI
G	22	Bruce Fraser	6 ft 5 in (1.96 m)	172 lb (78 kg)	So	Long Beach City College	Long Beach, CA
F	24	David Haskin	6 ft 5 in (1.96 m)	—	Jr	Sahuaro HS	Tucson, AZ
G	25	Steve Kerr	6 ft 3 in (1.91 m)	175 lb (79 kg)	So	Palisades Charter HS	Los Angeles, CA
F	32	Pete Williams	6 ft 7 in (2.01 m)	190 lb (86 kg)	Sr	Mt. San Antonio College	Harbor City, CA
F/C	33	Joe Turner	6 ft 9 in (2.06 m)	—	Fr	Foothill HS	Bakersfield, CA
F	34	Morgan Taylor	6 ft 7 in (2.01 m)	—	Sr	Northeast HS	Macon, GA
G	50	John Edgar	6 ft 6 in (1.98 m)	—	Jr	Los Angeles City College	Los Angeles, CA

Head coach

- Lute Olson (Augsburg)

Assistant coach(es)

- Ricky Byrdsong
- Rich Glas
- Scott Thompson

Legend

- (C) Team captain
- (S) Suspended
- (I) Ineligible
- (W) Walk-on
- Injured
- Current redshirt

== Schedule and results ==
Date time, TV	Rank^{#}	Opponent^{#}	Result	Record	Site (attendance) city, state
Non-conference regular season
Nov 23, 1984*		Houston Baptist	W 63–56	1–0	McKale Center; Tucson, Arizona
Nov 30, 1984*		Tulsa	W 84–80	2–0	McKale Center; Tucson, Arizona
Dec 1, 1984*		San Jose State	W 79–44	3–0	McKale Center; Tucson, Arizona
Dec 4, 1984*		Loyola Marymount	W 82–75	4–0	McKale Center; Tucson, Arizona
Dec 8, 1984*		at Northern Arizona	W 82–61	5–0	Walkup Skydome; Flagstaff, Arizona
Dec 10, 1984*		at Pan American	W 85–60	6–0	UTPA Fieldhouse; Edinburg, Texas
Dec 15, 1984*		San Francisco State	W 107–75	7–0	McKale Center; Tucson, Arizona
Dec 17, 1984*		Minnesota	L 79–88	7–1	McKale Center; Tucson, Arizona
Dec 20, 1984*		at New Mexico	L 58–59	7–2	The Pit; Albuquerque, New Mexico
Dec 26, 1984*		at Hawaii–Hilo	W 99–75	8–2	Afook-Chinen Civic Auditorium; Hilo, Hawaii
Dec 29, 1984*		vs. Missouri; Hawaii-Pacific Classic	L 73–76	8–3	Pearl Harbor, Hawaii
Dec 30, 1984*		at Hawaii Pacific; Hawaii-Pacific Classic	W 80–66	9–3	Pearl Harbor, Hawaii
Pac-10 regular season
Jan 5, 1985		at Arizona State; Rivalry	W 61–60	10–3 (1–0)	ASU Activity Center; Tempe, Arizona
Jan 10, 1985		at California	W 69–67	11–3 (2–0)	Harmon Gym; Berkeley, California
Jan 12, 1985		at Stanford	L 51–55	11–4 (2–1)	Maples Pavilion; Stanford, California
Jan 17, 1985		USC	L 63–64	11–5 (2–2)	McKale Center; Tucson, Arizona
Jan 19, 1985		UCLA; Rivalry	W 53–52	12–5 (3–2)	McKale Center; Tucson, Arizona
Jan 24, 1985		at No. 10 Oregon State	L 55–59	12–6 (3–3)	Gill Coliseum; Corvallis, Oregon
Jan 26, 1985		at Oregon	W 73–54	13–6 (4–3)	McArthur Court; Eugene, Oregon
Jan 31, 1985		Washington	W 69–56	14–6 (5–3)	McKale Center; Tucson, Arizona
Feb 2, 1985		Washington State	W 73–56	15–6 (6–3)	McKale Center; Tucson, Arizona
Feb 7, 1985		Stanford	W 68–56	16–6 (7–3)	McKale Center; Tucson, Arizona
Feb 9, 1985*		California	W 66–48	17–6 (8–3)	McKale Center; Tucson, Arizona
Feb 16, 1985		at USC	W 60–55	18–6 (9–3)	L.A. Sports Arena; Los Angeles, California
Feb 18, 1985		at Washington State	W 63–60	19–6 (10–3)	Friel Court; Pullman, Washington
Feb 21, 1985		Oregon	L 40–43	19–7 (10–4)	McKale Center; Tucson, Arizona
Feb 23, 1985		No. 19 Oregon State	W 67–52	20–7 (11–4)	McKale Center; Tucson, Arizona
Feb 28, 1985	No. 19	at Washington	L 58–60	20–8 (11–5)	Bank of America Arena; Seattle, Washington
Mar 2, 1985	No. 19	at UCLA; Rivalry	L 54–58	20–9 (11–6)	Pauley Pavilion; Los Angeles, California
Mar 9, 1985		Arizona State; Rivalry	W 68–48	21–9 (12–6)	McKale Center; Tucson, Arizona
NCAA Tournament
Mar 15, 1985*	(10 W)	vs. (7 W) Alabama; First Round	L 41–50	21–10	The Pit; Albuquerque, New Mexico
*Non-conference game. ^{#}Rankings from AP Poll. (#) Tournament seedings in parentheses. W=West.
