= List of Northern Arizona Lumberjacks in the NFL draft =

This is a list of Northern Arizona Lumberjacks football players in the NFL draft.

== Key ==
B	Back	K	Kicker	NT	Nose tackle
C	Center	LB	Linebacker	FB	Fullback
DB	Defensive back	P	Punter	HB	Halfback
DE	Defensive end	QB	Quarterback	WR	Wide receiver
DT	Defensive tackle	RB	Running back	G	Guard
E	End	T	Offensive tackle	TE	Tight end

== Selections ==
Year	Round	Pick	Overall	Player	Team	Position
1950	9	6	111	Vince Cisterna	New York Giants	E
1960	11	11	131	Ernie Hansen	San Francisco 49ers	C
1963	16	2	212	Rex Mirich	Minnesota Vikings	T
1964	19	8	260	Owen Dejanovich	Baltimore Colts	T
1966	9	12	137	Fritz Greenlee	Chicago Bears	WR
1967	6	24	157	Sims Stokes	Dallas Cowboys	WR
1968	3	23	78	Rich O'Hara	Baltimore Colts	WR
1970	5	14	118	Ed Duley	Houston Oilers	DT
1970	8	20	202	Mark Lomas	New York Jets	DE
1970	14	19	357	Charlie Brown	Detroit Lions	WR
1970	16	11	401	Bob Stewart	Denver Broncos	QB
1971	6	25	155	Steve Maier	Dallas Cowboys	WR
1971	12	3	289	Rich Saathoff	Philadelphia Eagles	DE
1973	12	15	301	Tom Ramsey	Kansas City Chiefs	DT
1978	10	26	276	Tom Jurich	Pittsburgh Steelers	K
1979	10	23	271	Allan Clark	New England Patriots	RB
1981	10	8	256	Gregg Gerken	Baltimore Colts	LB
1982	7	13	180	John Schachtner	Washington Redskins	LB
1983	12	26	333	Scott Lindquist	Los Angeles Raiders	QB
1984	2	19	47	Pete Mandley	Detroit Lions	WR
1987	5	4	116	Tom Gibson	New England Patriots	DE
1987	10	21	272	David Smith	Los Angeles Rams	LB
1988	7	1	166	Michael Haynes	Atlanta Falcons	WR
1989	1	27	27	Shawn Collins	Atlanta Falcons	WR
1989	5	22	134	Darren Carrington	Denver Broncos	DB
1989	11	23	302	Herb Duncan	Tampa Bay Buccaneers	WR
1990	6	28	165	Frank Pollack	San Francisco 49ers	T
1990	9	2	222	Darrell Jordan	Atlanta Falcons	LB
1990	12	24	328	David Lang	Los Angeles Rams	RB
1996	4	5	100	Jeff Lewis	Denver Broncos	QB
1996	5	11	143	Rayna Stewart	Houston Oilers	DB
2001	5	27	158	Raymond Perryman	Oakland Raiders	DB
2001	6	34	197	Francis St. Paul	St. Louis Rams	WR
2004	6	34	199	Clarence Moore	Baltimore Ravens	WR
2005	7	25	239	Paul Ernster	Denver Broncos	K
