= 1984–85 Oregon State Beavers men's basketball team =

American college basketball season

1984–85 Oregon State Beavers men's basketball

NCAA tournament
- Conference: Pac-10 Conference
- Record: 22–9 (12–6 Pac-10)
- Head coach: Ralph Miller (15th season)
- Assistant coach: Bob Gottlieb (2nd season)
- Home arena: Gill Coliseum

1984–85 Pacific-10 Conference men's basketball standings
| | Conf. | | | | Overall |
| Team | W | | L | PCT | W | | L | PCT |
|---|---|---|---|---|---|---|---|---|
| Washington | 13 | – | 5 | .722 | 22 | – | 10 | .688 |
| USC | 13 | – | 5 | .722 | 19 | – | 10 | .655 |
| Oregon State | 12 | – | 6 | .667 | 22 | – | 9 | .710 |
| Arizona | 12 | – | 6 | .667 | 21 | – | 10 | .677 |
| UCLA | 12 | – | 6 | .667 | 21 | – | 12 | .636 |
| Oregon | 8 | – | 10 | .444 | 15 | – | 16 | .484 |
| Arizona State | 7 | – | 11 | .389 | 12 | – | 16 | .429 |
| Washington State | 5 | – | 13 | .278 | 13 | – | 15 | .464 |
| California | 5 | – | 13 | .278 | 13 | – | 15 | .464 |
| Stanford | 3 | – | 15 | .167 | 11 | – | 17 | .393 |
As of November 25, 2011; Rankings from AP Poll

The 1984–85 Oregon State Beavers men's basketball team represented the Oregon State University as a member of the Pacific 10 Conference during the 1984–85 NCAA Division I men's basketball season. They were led by 15th-year head coach Ralph Miller and played their home games on campus at Gill Coliseum in Corvallis, Oregon.

After opening the season at 15–1 and peaking at No. 10 in the AP poll, Oregon State finished the regular season at 21–9 (12–6 Pac-10), and received an at-large bid to the NCAA tournament. As No. 10 seed in the Southeast region, the Beavers were beaten by No. 7 seed Notre Dame, 79–70, in a game that was played on the home floor of the Fighting Irish.

== Roster ==
1984–85 Oregon State Beavers men's basketball team
Players
Coaches

| Pos. | # | Name | Height | Weight | Year | Hometown |
|---|---|---|---|---|---|---|
| F | 00 | Steve Woodside | 6 ft 9 in (2.06 m) | — | Jr |
| F | 45 | A.C. Green | 6 ft 9 in (2.06 m) | 220 lb (100 kg) | Sr | Portland, Oregon |

Head coach

- Ralph Miller

Assistant coach(es)

- Bob Gottlieb

Legend

- (C) Team captain
- (S) Suspended
- (I) Ineligible
- (W) Walk-on
- Injured
- Current redshirt

== Schedule and results ==
| Date time, TV | Rank^{#} | Opponent^{#} | Result | Record | Site city, state |
Regular season
| Dec 1, 1984* | | Missouri | W 54–52 | 1–0 | Gill Coliseum; Corvallis, Oregon |
| Dec 7, 1984* | | Portland | W 69–54 | 2–0 | Gill Coliseum; Corvallis, Oregon |
| Dec 8, 1984* | | Gonzaga | W 62–46 | 3–0 | Gill Coliseum; Corvallis, Oregon |
| Dec 15, 1984* | | at Boise State | W 74–59 | 4–0 | BSU Pavilion; Boise, Idaho |
| Dec 18, 1984* | | at Santa Clara | W 64–62 | 5–0 | Leavey Center; Santa Clara, California |
| Dec 21, 1984* | | at Hawaii | L 64–81 | 5–1 | Neal S. Blaisdell Center; Honolulu, Hawaii |
| Dec 22, 1984* | | at Hawaii–Loa | W 97–49 | 6–1 | Neal S. Blaisdell Center (150); Honolulu, Hawaii |
| Dec 27, 1984* | | vs. Pennsylvania; Far West Classic | W 80–58 | 7–1 | Memorial Coliseum; Portland, Oregon |
| Dec 28, 1984* | | vs. Fresno State; Far West Classic | W 66–50 | 8–1 | Memorial Coliseum; Portland, Oregon |
| Dec 29, 1984* | | vs. California; Far West Classic | W 70–59 | 9–1 | Memorial Coliseum; Portland, Oregon |
| Jan 3, 1985 | | UCLA | W 59–49 | 10–1 (1–0) | Gill Coliseum; Corvallis, Oregon |
| Jan 5, 1985 | | at No. 15 Washington | W 52–45 | 11–1 (2–0) | Bank of America Arena; Seattle, Washington |
| Jan 9, 1985 | No. 20 | Oregon | W 59–54 | 12–1 (3–0) | Gill Coliseum; Corvallis, Oregon |
| Jan 12, 1985* | No. 20 | at Kansas State | W 56–55 | 13–1 | Ahearn Field House; Manhattan, Kansas |
| Jan 19, 1985 | No. 14 | at Washington State | W 73–57 | 14–1 (4–0) | Friel Court; Pullman, Washington |
| Jan 24, 1985 | No. 10 | Arizona | W 59–55 | 15–1 (5–0) | Gill Coliseum; Corvallis, Oregon |
| Jan 26, 1985 | No. 10 | Arizona State | L 82–83 | 15–2 (5–1) | Gill Coliseum; Corvallis, Oregon |
| Jan 31, 1985 | No. 14 | at California | L 36–42 | 15–3 (5–2) | Harmon Gym; Berkeley, California |
| Feb 2, 1985 | No. 14 | at Stanford | W 83–73 | 16–3 (6–2) | Maples Pavilion; Stanford, California |
| Feb 4, 1985 | No. 14 | USC | L 58–60 | 16–4 (6–3) | Gill Coliseum; Corvallis, Oregon |
| Feb 9, 1985 | No. 16 | at Oregon | W 53–51 | 17–4 (7–3) | McArthur Court; Eugene, Oregon |
| Feb 14, 1985 | No. 18 | Washington State | W 69–49 | 18–4 (8–3) | Gill Coliseum; Corvallis, Oregon |
| Feb 16, 1985 | No. 18 | Washington | L 45–60 | 18–5 (8–4) | Gill Coliseum; Corvallis, Oregon |
| Feb 21, 1985 | No. 19 | at Arizona State | W 75–64 | 19–5 (9–4) | ASU Activity Center; Tempe, Arizona |
| Feb 23, 1985 | No. 19 | at Arizona | L 52–67 | 19–6 (9–5) | McKale Center; Tucson, Arizona |
| Feb 26, 1985* | | New Mexico | L 65–72 | 19–7 | Gill Coliseum; Corvallis, Oregon |
| Feb 28, 1985 | | Stanford | W 54–49 | 20–7 (10–5) | Gill Coliseum; Corvallis, Oregon |
| Mar 2, 1985 | | California | W 51–37 | 21–7 (11–5) | Gill Coliseum; Corvallis, Oregon |
| Mar 7, 1985 | | at UCLA | L 51–59 | 21–8 (11–6) | Pauley Pavilion; Los Angeles, California |
| Mar 9, 1985 | | at USC | W 60–58 | 22–8 (12–6) | L.A. Sports Arena; Los Angeles, California |
NCAA Tournament
| Mar 14, 1985* | (10 SE) | vs. (7 SE) Notre Dame; First round | L 70–79 | 22–9 | Athletic & Convocation Center; South Bend, Indiana |
*Non-conference game. ^{#}Rankings from AP Poll. (#) Tournament seedings in parentheses. SE=Southeast. All times are in Pacific.

== NBA draft ==
| Round | Pick | Player | NBA club |
|---|---|---|---|
| 1 | 23 | A.C. Green | Los Angeles Lakers |
