= Nigrini =

Nigrini is a surname. Notable people with the surname include:

- Mark Nigrini, South African-born American academic
- Peter Nigrini, American projection designer

== See also ==
- Negrini
