= Brad Wright (basketball) =

American basketball player

Personal information
- Born: March 27, 1962 (age 64) Hollywood, California, U.S.
- Listed height: 7 ft 0 in (2.13 m)
- Listed weight: 225 lb (102 kg)

Career information
- High school: Daniel Murphy (Los Angeles, California)
- College: UCLA (1981–1985)
- NBA draft: 1985: 3rd round, 49th overall pick
- Drafted by: Golden State Warriors
- Playing career: 1985–1995
- Position: Power forward / center
- Number: 8, 35

Career history
- 1985–1986: Caen
- 1985–1986: Cincinnati Slammers
- 1986–1987: Wyoming Wildcatters
- 1987: New York Knicks
- 1987–1988: Wyoming Wildcatters
- 1988: Denver Nuggets
- 1987–1988: Rockford Lightning
- 1988–1989: Libertas Livorno
- 1989–1990: Basket Rimini
- 1990–1991: Ourense Baloncesto
- 1991–1992: Bàsquet Manresa
- 1992–1993: CB Las Rozas
- 1993–1994: Ourense Baloncesto
- 1994–1995: C.C.Llobregat Cornellà
- 1998–1999: Mens Sana Basket

Career highlights
- CBA All-Star (1988); 2× All-CBA Second Team (1987, 1988)
- Stats at NBA.com
- Stats at Basketball Reference

Bradford William Wright (born March 27, 1962, in Hollywood, California), is an American former professional basketball player. He attended Daniel Murphy High School in Los Angeles, and played college basketball for the UCLA Bruins. Wright was drafted by the NBA's Golden State Warriors with the 49th pick of the 1985 NBA draft. He played 14 games with the New York Knicks and 2 games with the Denver Nuggets before injury.

Wright attended the University of California, Los Angeles, where he majored in history. As a senior with the Bruins in 1984–85, he made 10 of 11 field goals, scoring 23 points along with 12 rebounds and four blocked shots in a win over Louisville in the semifinals of the 1985 National Invitation Tournament. UCLA defeated Indiana in the finals, when Wright held the Hoosiers' 7-foot-2-inch (2.18 m) center, Uwe Blab, to 12 points and forced him to foul out with 54 seconds remaining in the game.

Wright played in the Continental Basketball Association (CBA) for the Cincinnati Slammers, Wyoming Wildcatters and Rockford Lightning from 1985 to 1988. He was selected to the All-CBA Second Team in 1987 and 1988 and named a CBA All-Star in 1988.

== Career statistics ==
Legend
GP	Games played	GS	Games started	MPG	Minutes per game
FG%	Field goal percentage	3P%	3-point field goal percentage	FT%	Free throw percentage
RPG	Rebounds per game	APG	Assists per game	SPG	Steals per game
BPG	Blocks per game	PPG	Points per game	**Bold**	Career high

=== NBA ===
==== Regular season ====
Year	Team	GP	GS	MPG	FG%	3P%	FT%	RPG	APG	SPG	BPG	PPG
1986–87	New York	**14**	0	**9.9**	**.435**	.000	**.429**	**3.8**	**.1**	**.2**	**.4**	**3.7**
1987–88	Denver	2	0	3.5	.200	–	–	.5	.0	.0	.0	1.0
Career		16	0	9.1	.412	.000	.429	3.4	.1	.2	.4	3.4
