= 1984–85 Washington Huskies men's basketball team =

American college basketball season

1984–85 Washington Huskies men's basketball

Pacific-10 Conference Co-champions

NCAA tournament, First round
- Conference: Pacific-10 Conference
- Record: 22–10 (13–5 Pac-10)
- Head coach: Marv Harshman (14th season)
- Assistant coach: Bob Johnson
- Home arena: Hec Edmundson Pavilion

1984–85 Pacific-10 Conference men's basketball standings
| | Conf. | | | | Overall |
| Team | W | | L | PCT | W | | L | PCT |
|---|---|---|---|---|---|---|---|---|
| Washington | 13 | – | 5 | .722 | 22 | – | 10 | .688 |
| USC | 13 | – | 5 | .722 | 19 | – | 10 | .655 |
| Oregon State | 12 | – | 6 | .667 | 22 | – | 9 | .710 |
| Arizona | 12 | – | 6 | .667 | 21 | – | 10 | .677 |
| UCLA | 12 | – | 6 | .667 | 21 | – | 12 | .636 |
| Oregon | 8 | – | 10 | .444 | 15 | – | 16 | .484 |
| Arizona State | 7 | – | 11 | .389 | 12 | – | 16 | .429 |
| Washington State | 5 | – | 13 | .278 | 13 | – | 15 | .464 |
| California | 5 | – | 13 | .278 | 13 | – | 15 | .464 |
| Stanford | 3 | – | 15 | .167 | 11 | – | 17 | .393 |
As of November 25, 2011; Rankings from AP Poll

The 1984–85 Washington Huskies men's basketball team represented the University of Washington for the 1984–85 NCAA Division I men's basketball season. Led by fourteenth-year head coach Marv Harshman, the Huskies were members of the Pacific-10 Conference and played their home games on campus at Hec Edmundson Pavilion in Seattle, Washington.

The Huskies were 22–9 overall in the regular season and 13–5 in conference play, co-champions with USC. There was no conference tournament this season; it debuted two years later.

Washington was seeded fifth in the West regional of the 64-team NCAA tournament, but was upset by Kentucky in the first round in Salt Lake City. The Wildcats defeated fourth-seed UNLV and advanced to the Sweet Sixteen, where they fell to St. John's, the top seed in the West.

Harshman, age 67, retired at the end of the season. Andy Russo, the head coach at Louisiana Tech, was hired in early April.

== Postseason results ==
| Date time, TV | Rank^{#} | Opponent^{#} | Result | Record | Site (attendance) city, state |
NCAA Tournament
| Thu, March 14*; 8:37 pm, CBS | (5W) | vs. (12W) Kentucky; First round | L 58–66 | 22–10 | Special Events Center (7,351); Salt Lake City, Utah |
*Non-conference game. ^{#}Rankings from AP poll. (#) Tournament seedings in parentheses. All times are in Pacific time.

== NBA draft ==
| Round | Pick | Player | NBA club |
|---|---|---|---|
| 1 | 8 | Detlef Schrempf | Dallas Mavericks |
