= 1984–85 Washington State Cougars men's basketball team =

American college basketball season

1984–85 Washington State Cougars men's basketball
- Conference: Pacific-10
- Record: 13–15 (5–13 Pac-10)
- Head coach: Len Stevens (2nd season)
- Assistant coaches: Stu Jackson; Prescott "Puck" Smith
- Home arena: Beasley Coliseum

1984–85 Pacific-10 Conference men's basketball standings
	Conf.				Overall
Team	W		L	PCT	W		L	PCT
Washington	13	–	5	.722	22	–	10	.688
USC	13	–	5	.722	19	–	10	.655
Oregon State	12	–	6	.667	22	–	9	.710
Arizona	12	–	6	.667	21	–	10	.677
UCLA	12	–	6	.667	21	–	12	.636
Oregon	8	–	10	.444	15	–	16	.484
Arizona State	7	–	11	.389	12	–	16	.429
Washington State	5	–	13	.278	13	–	15	.464
California	5	–	13	.278	13	–	15	.464
Stanford	3	–	15	.167	11	–	17	.393
As of November 25, 2011; Rankings from AP Poll

The 1984–85 Washington State Cougars men's basketball team represented Washington State University for the 1984–85 NCAA Division I men's basketball season. Led by second-year head coach Len Stevens, the Cougars were members of the Pacific-10 Conference and played their home games on campus at Beasley Coliseum in Pullman, Washington.

The Cougars were 13–15 overall in the regular season and 5–13 in conference play, tied for eighth in the standings. There was no conference tournament this season; it debuted two years later.
