= 1984–85 UCLA Bruins men's basketball team =

American college basketball season

1984–85 UCLA Bruins men's basketball

NIT, champions
- Conference: Pacific-10
- Record: 21–12 (12–6, T-3rd Pac-10)
- Head coach: Walt Hazzard
- Assistant coaches: Sidney Wicks; Jack Hirsch; Andre McCarter
- Home arena: Pauley Pavilion

1984–85 Pacific-10 Conference men's basketball standings
	Conf.				Overall
Team	W		L	PCT	W		L	PCT
Washington	13	–	5	.722	22	–	10	.688
USC	13	–	5	.722	19	–	10	.655
Oregon State	12	–	6	.667	22	–	9	.710
Arizona	12	–	6	.667	21	–	10	.677
UCLA	12	–	6	.667	21	–	12	.636
Oregon	8	–	10	.444	15	–	16	.484
Arizona State	7	–	11	.389	12	–	16	.429
Washington State	5	–	13	.278	13	–	15	.464
California	5	–	13	.278	13	–	15	.464
Stanford	3	–	15	.167	11	–	17	.393
As of November 25, 2011; Rankings from AP Poll

The 1984–85 UCLA Bruins men's basketball team represented the University of California, Los Angeles. The Bruins received their first invitation to the National Invitation Tournament (NIT) in school history. The team went 5–0 and defeated the Indiana Hoosiers in the final; Reggie Miller was named the tournament's most valuable player.

Walt Hazzard began his first season as head coach of UCLA after replacing Larry Farmer. The team included a core of seniors in center Brad Wright, power forward Gary Maloncon, and point guard Nigel Miguel. Miguel was a defensive stopper, and assigned to the opponents' best scorer. He was the only Bruin named to the all-conference team in the Pacific-10, and he was also the Pac-10 Defensive Player of the Year.

== Starting lineup ==
Position	Player	Class
F	Reggie Miller	So.
F	Gary Maloncon	Sr.
C	Brad Wright	Sr.
G	Nigel Miguel	Sr.
G	Montel Hatcher	So.

== Roster ==
1985–86 UCLA Bruins men's basketball team
Players
Coaches

Pos.	#	Name	Height	Weight	Year	Hometown
F	42	Kelvin Butler	6 ft 6 in (1.98 m)	—	Fr
G	4	Corey Gaines	6 ft 4 in (1.93 m)	—	So	Los Angeles, California
C	15	Jack Haley	6 ft 10 in (2.08 m)	—	So	Long Beach, California
G	12	Montel Hatcher	6 ft 1 in (1.85 m)	—	So
G	30	Dave Immel	6 ft 4 in (1.93 m)	—	So
F	52	Craig Jackson	6 ft 7 in (2.01 m)	—	Fr
F	22	Jerald Jones	6 ft 5 in (1.96 m)	—	Fr
F	53	Gary Maloncon	6 ft 8 in (2.03 m)	—	Sr
G	25	Nigel Miguel	6 ft 6 in (1.98 m)	—	Sr
F	31	Reggie Miller	6 ft 7 in (2.01 m)	—	So	Riverside, California
C	32	Brad Wright	6 ft 11 in (2.11 m)	—	Sr	Hollywood, California

Head coach

Walt Hazzard (UCLA)

Assistant coach(es)

- Sidney Wicks (UCLA)
- Jack Hirsch (UCLA)
- Andre McCarter (UCLA)

Legend

- (C) Team captain
- (S) Suspended
- (I) Ineligible
- (W) Walk-on
- Injured
- Current redshirt

Roster

== Schedule ==
Date time, TV	Rank^{#}	Opponent^{#}	Result	Record	Site city, state
Regular Season
November 23, 1984*		Idaho	W 87–58	1–0	Pauley Pavilion (6,584); Los Angeles, CA
November 24, 1984*		Santa Clara	L 60–68	1–1	Pauley Pavilion (8,186); Los Angeles, CA
December 1, 1984*		at No. 2 DePaul	L 61–80	1–2	Allstate Arena (17,269); Chicago, IL
December 8, 1984*		at No. 5 Memphis State	L 70–86	1–3	Mid-South Coliseum (11,200); Memphis, TN
December 15, 1984*		U.S. International	W 98–50	2–3	Pauley Pavilion (3,528); Los Angeles, CA
December 19, 1984*		at BYU	L 81–89	2–4	Marriott Center (13,792); Provo, UT
December 22, 1984*		at No. 8 St. John's	L 69–88	2–5	Madison Square Garden (15,256); New York, NY
December 29, 1984*		Oral Roberts	W 69–61	3–5	Pauley Pavilion (5,841); Los Angeles, CA
January 3, 1985		at Oregon State	L 49–59	3–6 (0–1)	Gill Coliseum (10,400); Corvallis, OR
January 5, 1985		Oregon	W 67–59 ^{2OT}	4–6 (1–1)	Pauley Pavilion (6,322); Los Angeles, CA
January 10, 1985		Washington State	W 75–48	5–6 (2–1)	Pauley Pavilion (8,438); Los Angeles, CA
January 17, 1985		at Arizona State	W 64–61	6–6 (3–1)	Wells Fargo Arena (6,520); Tempe, AZ
January 19, 1985		at Arizona	L 52–53	6–7 (3–2)	McKale Center (11,075); Tucson, AZ
January 21, 1985		Washington	W 63–51	7–7 (4–2)	Pauley Pavilion (10,322); Los Angeles, CA
January 24, 1985		California	W 80–69	8–7 (5–2)	Pauley Pavilion (8,264); Los Angeles, CA
January 26, 1985		Stanford	W 100–71	9–7 (6–2)	Pauley Pavilion (11,178); Los Angeles, CA
February 1, 1985		at USC	L 77–78 ^{2OT}	9–8 (6–3)	Los Angeles Memorial Sports Arena (13,640); Los Angeles, CA
February 3, 1985*		Notre Dame	L 52–53	9–9	Pauley Pavilion (12,034); Los Angeles, CA
February 7, 1985		at Washington State	L 58–66 ^{OT}	9–10 (6–4)	Beasley Coliseum (2,600); Pullman, WA
February 9, 1985		at Washington	L 61–67	9–11 (6–5)	Hec Edmundson Pavilion (6,808); Seattle, WA
February 16, 1985		Arizona State	W 69–65	10–11 (7–5)	Pauley Pavilion (7,883); Los Angeles, CA
February 18, 1985		at Stanford	W 72–66	11–11 (8–5)	Maples Pavilion (6,177); Stanford, CA
February 21, 1985		at California	W 53–48	12–11 (9–5)	Harmon Gym (6,600); Berkeley, CA
February 24, 1985*		Louisville	W 75–65	13–11	Pauley Pavilion (9,231); Los Angeles, CA
February 28, 1985		USC	L 78–80 ^{4OT}	13–12 (9–6)	Pauley Pavilion (12,572); Los Angeles, CA
March 2, 1985		No. 19 Arizona	W 58–54	14–12 (10–6)	Pauley Pavilion (7,582); Los Angeles, CA
March 7, 1985		Oregon State	W 59–51	15–12 (11–6)	Pauley Pavilion (10,344); Los Angeles, CA
March 9, 1985		at Oregon	W 72–69	16–12 (12–6)	McArthur Court (10,099); Eugene, OR
NIT
March 13, 1985*		Montana	W 78–47	17–12	Pauley Pavilion (4,820); Los Angeles, CA
March 19, 1985*		Nebraska	W 82–63	18–12	Pauley Pavilion (7,228); Los Angeles, CA
March 23, 1985*		Fresno State	W 53–43	19–12	Pauley Pavilion (12,577); Los Angeles, CA
March 27, 1985*		vs. Louisville	W 75–66	20–12	Madison Square Garden (9,474); New York, NY
March 29, 1985*		vs. Indiana	W 65–62	21–12	Madison Square Garden (12,454); New York, NY
*Non-conference game. ^{#}Rankings from AP Poll. (#) Tournament seedings in parentheses. All times are in Pacific Time.

== Awards and honors ==
- Reggie Miller, Most Outstanding Player, NIT

== Team players drafted into the NBA ==
Year	Round	Pick	Player	NBA Team
1985	3	48	Brad Wright	Golden State Warriors
1985	3	62	Nigel Miguel	New Jersey Nets
1985	7	143	Gary Maloncon	Los Angeles Clippers
1987	1	11	Reggie Miller	Indiana Pacers
1987	4	79	Jack Haley	Chicago Bulls
1987	7	149	Montel Hatcher	Indiana Pacers

== Notes ==
- The Bruins finished tied for 3rd in the Pacific-10.
- The team played in 4 OT games, 2 double-OT and 1 4-OT vs. USC.
- Cross town USC managed to pull a rare sweep of UCLA, the first since the 1941–42 season.
