= All-American Professional Basketball League =

- Sport: Basketball
- Founded: 2005
- Folded: 2005
- No. of teams: 10
- Country: United States

The All-American Professional Basketball League was a minor basketball league formed in 2005 by Worth Christie. Announced on January 23, 2005 the league viewed itself as a direct minor league outlet for the National Basketball Association (NBA). The best players were to be promised salaries of up to $40,000. The league was composed of 10 teams and these ten teams were regionalized with 3-4 NBA teams where the designated AAPBL team could negotiate with players released from those NBA teams before other AAPBL teams could.

The AAPBL held a tryout camp at the MetraPark Arena in Billings, Montana from July 11 to July 23. Players paid $1,000 to participate in the training camp.

The league held two "dispersal drafts". On July 20, 2005 the league's teams drafted from available CBA and NBDL players. On July 28, 2005 the teams drafted from the players who participated in the training camp.

On August 1, 2005, mere days after the tryouts and drafts and days after insiders knew its fate, Worth Christie announced the league had folded. Contrary to earlier reports, few if any players who participated in the tryouts received their $1,000 back. Those working with the league and Christie were not paid for their expenses to work at the tryout camp nor were they compensated for any of the work done.

On July 29, 2006, the Billings Gazette reported that Worth Christie was facing over $100,000 in lawsuits from former AAPBL employees and coaches.

== AAPBL teams & rosters ==
The following lists the teams and their draft picks (from the two dispersal drafts). These players never signed contracts nor played with these teams, since the league folded so quickly.

- Billings Rims - Jackie Butler, Toshiro Germany, Randy Livingston, Kasib Powell, Chad Prewitt, Alhaji Mohammed, DeSean Hadley, Doug Overton, Will Moore, Cedric Moodie, Demarcus Hense, Luke Kunkel
- Butte Bandits - Bobby Lazor, Donald Williams, Patrick Okafor, Brian Lubeck, Darrin Hancock, LeRoy Hurd, George Williams, Byron Mouton, Eric Walton, Steve Horne, Tai Tuisamoa, Joseph Britto, Rashaad Powell, Derrick Lemuel
- Great Falls Cowboys - Carlos Daniel, Maurice Spillers, Kevin Sweetwyne, David Jackson, Ronald Blackshear, Garry Hill-Thomas, Miah Davis, Joe Buck, Anton Lyons, Matt Ludtke, Drieke Bouldin
- Hutchinson Ballhogs - Britton Johnsen, Adam Parada, Casey Sanders, Melvin Sanders, Lazarus Sims, Reggie Jordan, Cordell Henry, Derrick Zimmerman, Ryan Lohfink, Davin White, Derrick Grant, Gerald Johnson, Malik Edwards, Brian Zirkle
- Lincoln Generals - Head Coach: Mark Berokoff, Stais Boseman, Jermaine Walker, Reed Rawlings, Keith Closs, Marshall Phillips, DeeAndre Hulett, Livan Pyfrom, Omar Cook, Kameron Gray, Terris Sifford, David Johnson, David Finklea, Marcus Wernke
- Mankato Mallards - Sam Clancy, Ramel Curry, Andre McCullough, Shawn Daniels, Sam Cook, Nate Miller, Quincy Hinton, Carlton Dean, Kellen Fernetti
- Minot Minutemen - Charles Gaines, Alpha Bangura, Brad Buddenborg, Jerome Beasley, Austin Nichols, Seth Doliboa, Kitwana Rhymer, Sam Mack, Peron Austin, Justin Murray, Jason Smith, Darius Pope, Booker Nabors, Troy Gwynn, Michael Allen
- Topeka Tornado - Billy Thomas, Lawrence Nelson, Wayne Turner, Derek Grimm, Lonnie Jones, Juaquin Hawkins, Louis White, Majestic Mapp, Marvin Johnson, Michael Dyson, Travis Canby, Adrick Hills
- Wichita Bombers - Jarrod Gee, Bryant Notree, Julius Page, Romeo Augustine, David Young, Maurice Baker, Jeff Brandt, Alex Sanders, Tony Qorri
- Wyoming Golden Eagles - Darius Rice, Nick Sheppard, Ruben Boumtje-Boumtje, Bang Sung-Yoon, John Smith, Carl English, Marcus Moore, Glenn Jones, Mike Scott, LeRoy Hickerson, Paul O'Liney, Greg Hendricks

The 1st pick of the draft went to the Mankato Mallards and they selected Sam Clancy who was the 2004-05 CBA Player of the Year.

== AAPBL team allocations ==
The teams in the AAPBL were assigned NBA and college teams, largely based on region. Theoretically, if a player was released from a certain NBA team, the AAPBL team assigned with that NBA team was allowed the first chance to sign him before any other team in the AAPBL. For the college programs, it worked the same way. If a player wasn't drafted in the NBA draft he would have first rights to be picked up by the designated AAPBL team.

=== NBA ===
- Great Falls – Sacramento Kings, Golden State Warriors, Phoenix Suns
- Butte – Portland Trail Blazers, Seattle SuperSonics, Utah Jazz
- Billings – Philadelphia 76ers, Washington Wizards, Toronto Raptors
- Minot – Denver Nuggets, Los Angeles Lakers, Los Angeles Clippers
- Wyoming - New Orleans Hornets, Atlanta Hawks, Memphis Grizzlies
- Wichita - San Antonio Spurs, Houston Rockets, Dallas Mavericks
- Lincoln – Miami Heat, Orlando Magic, Charlotte Bobcats
- Hutchinson – Chicago Bulls, Indiana Pacers, Cleveland Cavaliers
- Topeka - New York Knicks, New Jersey Nets, Boston Celtics
- Mankato – Minnesota Timberwolves, Milwaukee Bucks, Detroit Pistons

=== Colleges ===
- Great Falls - Montana, Washington State, Fresno State
- Butte - Oregon, Oregon State, Montana State
- Billings - Washington, UNLV, Gonzaga
- Minot - Colorado, Colorado State, New Mexico
- Wyoming - Wyoming, BYU, Utah
- Wichita - Wichita State, Oklahoma, Oklahoma State
- Lincoln - Nebraska, Creighton, Drake
- Hutchinson - Iowa, Iowa State, Northern Iowa
- Topeka - Kansas, Kansas State, Missouri
- Mankato - Minnesota, Milwaukee, Wisconsin

== AAPBL Summer League ==
The Summer League Training Camp ran from July 11-July 23 at the MetraPark Arena in Billings, Montana. Each team in the league consisted of players who paid $1,000 to participate in the camp. Players drafted in the dispersal draft of July 20 were not included in this.

=== Standings ===
2005 AAPBL Summer League Final Standings
Pos	Team	Games	W	L	Win %
1	Great Falls Cowboys	11	11	0	1.000
2	Hutchinson Ballhogs	11	9	2	.818
3	Butte Bandits+	11	7	4	.636
4	Minot Minutemen	11	7	4	.636
5	Wichita Bombers	11	6	5	.545
6	Lincoln Generals	11	5	6	.455
7	Mankato Mallards	11	4	7	.364
8	Wyoming Golden Eagles	11	3	8	.273
9	Billings Rims	11	2	9	.182
10	Topeka Tornado	11	1	10	.091

+ Butte defeated Minot in play, therefore they technically rank ahead of Minot

=== Statistical leaders ===
- Points Scored - 267/24.3 PPG - Darius Pope - Minot Minutemen
- Rebounds - 134/12.2 RPG - Tony Qorri - Wichita Bombers
- Assists - 149/13.5 APG - Peron Austin - Minot Minutemen
- Steals - 32/2.9 SPG - Nate Miller - Mankato Mallards
- Blocks - 31/2.8 BPG - Marcus Wernke - Lincoln Generals

=== Single game records ===
- Points Scored (Team) - 142 - Great Falls Cowboys - 7/21/05
- Points Scored (Player) - 45 - Glenn Jones - Wyoming Golden Eagles - 7/21/05
- Rebounds (Player) - 25 - Justin Murray - Minot Minutemen - 7/12/05
- Assists (Player) - 29 - Peron Austin - Minot Minutemen - 7/11/05
- Steals (Player) - 7 - Chris Ealim - Minot Minutemen - 7/21/05
- Blocks (Player) - 7 - Marcus Wernke - Lincoln Generals - 7/19/05
- Fewest Points Scored (Team) - 71 - Minot Minutemen - 7/13/05 and Topeka Tornado - 7/22/05

== 2005–06 regular season ==
- The League's first regular season contest was scheduled for November 8, 2005. The Minot Minutemen were to visit the Billings Rims.
- Each team was to play 50 games from November to March, with playoffs concluding in early April. The playoff format had yet to be discussed.

== Miscellaneous ==
- The AAPBL Summer League Offices were located at the Northern Hotel in Billings, Montana.
- A $1 program was sold to attendees at the Summer League games. A day pass cost $10. Every team played on all 11 days and a day pass granted access to every game
- The AAPBL office was located in Casper, Wyoming.
- Two cities originally slated to host teams were Pueblo, Colorado and Cedar Rapids, Iowa. The Cedar Rapids Ballhogs moved to Hutchinson, and the Pueblo Aztecs moved to Minot, North Dakota and became the Minutemen.
- League's tagline was "A bounce away from the NBA".
- Not to be confused with the All-American Professional Basketball League that played from 1947–1948
- Owner Worth Christie filed for chapter 7 bankruptcy. Claiming only $2 in assets and still not paid salaries to players, coaches, arenas and staff.

== See also ==
- July 29th, 2006 Billings Gazette article on AAPBL lawsuits
- List of developmental and minor sports leagues
