= Gualtiero Negrini =

American opera singer

Gualtiero Negrini (born January 24, 1961) is an American singer of Irish-Italian heritage.

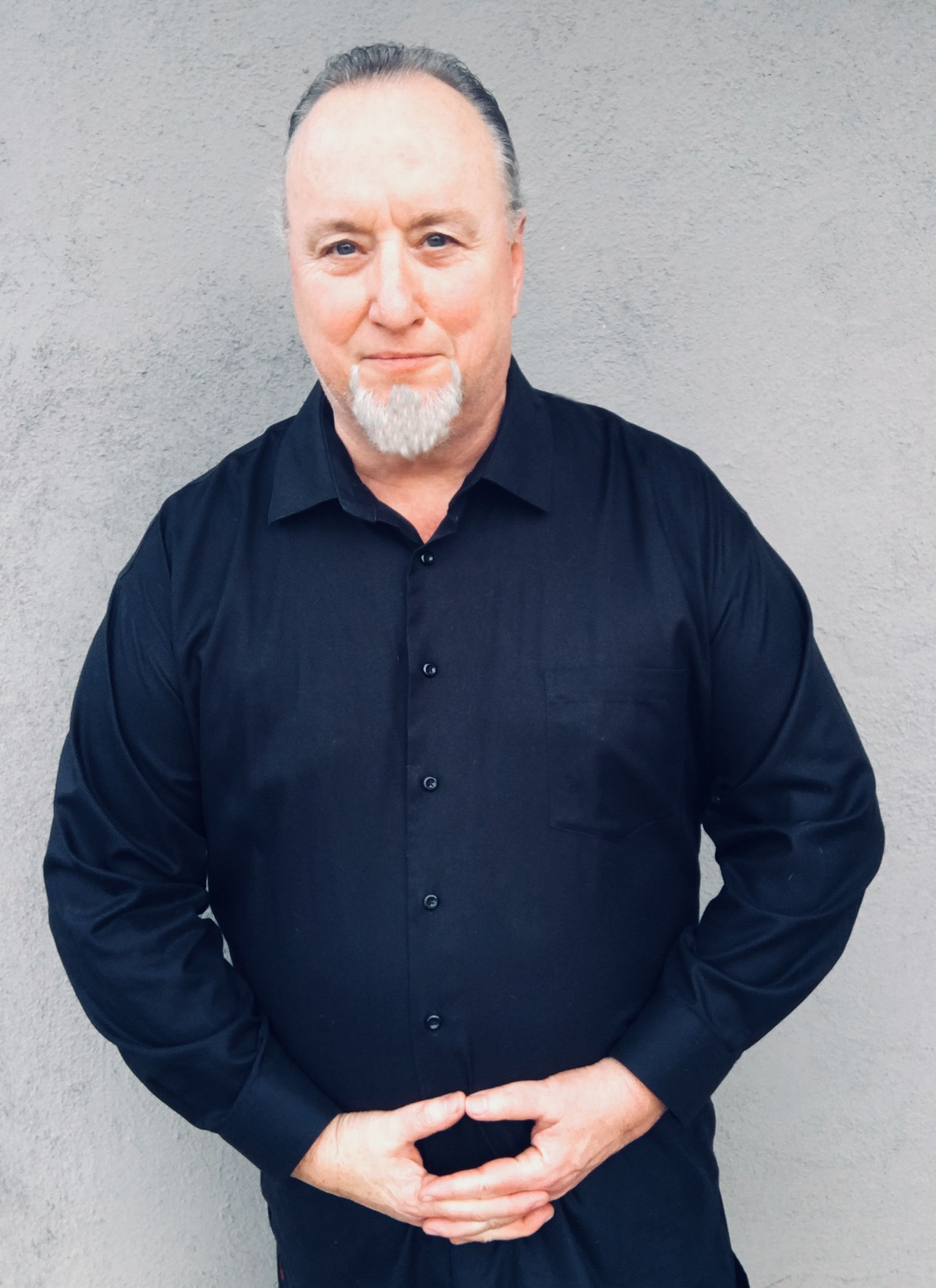
Gualtiero Negrini in 2018

== Origins ==
Gualtiero Negrini was born to Luciano Negrini (a former Catholic Priest and bass opera singer from Milano, Italy), and Clare Mary Negrini (née Young, an Irish-American mezzo-soprano opera singer from Chicago). His great uncle, the tenor Carlo Negrini, created the role of Gabriele Adorno for Giuseppe Verdi, in the premiere of Simon Boccanegra in Venice in 1857. Throughout his youth, Negrini used to say that he had been born in Milano as a tribute to his father who had always lamented that none of his four sons had been born in Italy. Although he spent time there as a child and in subsequent years, he was actually born at the Hollywood Presbyterian Medical Center in California, and considers himself a proud Angeleno. He attended St Casimir's Elementary School, Daniel Murphy High School, and USC Opera Workshop, all in Los Angeles.

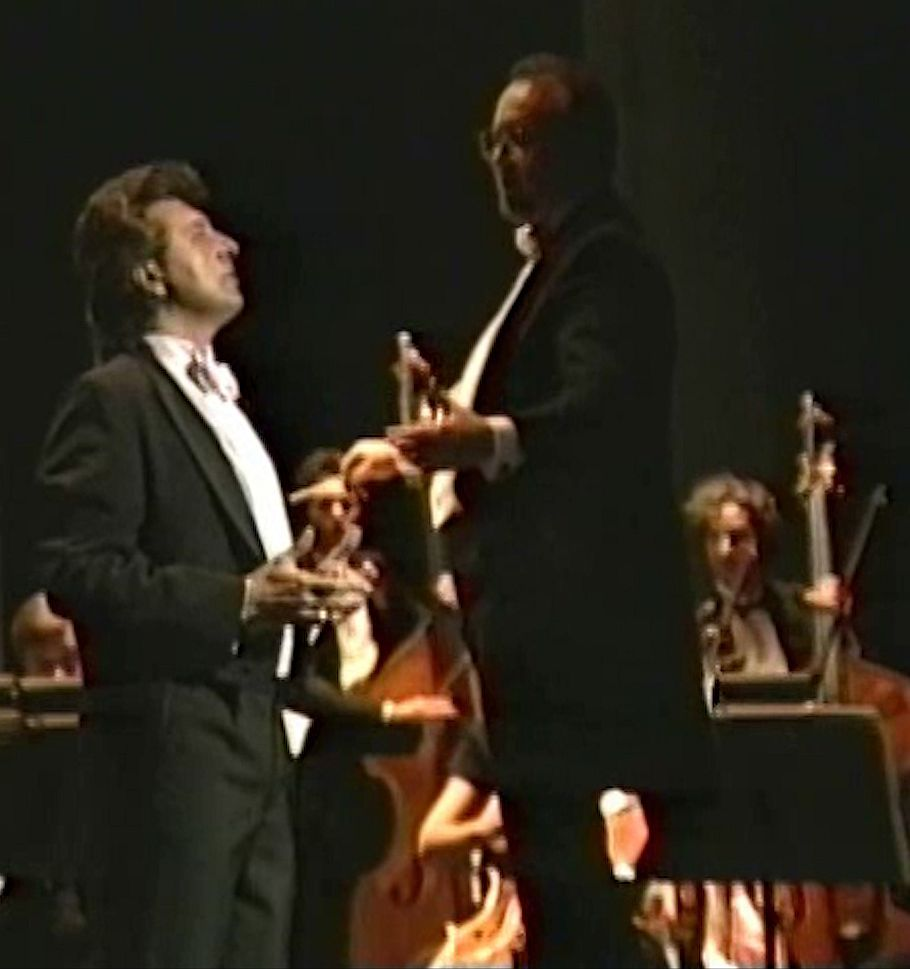
Gualtiero Negrini conducting Jerry Hadley with the Opera Orchestra of Los Angeles in 1994

== Conducting ==
Gualtiero Negrini began his studies at a very early age as a pianist and conductor under former Berlin Philharmonic conductor Fritz Zweig, and Dr. George Dawson of California State University, Long Beach. He conducted his first performances at the age of 13, a two-piano performance of Madama Butterfly with a small local amateur opera company. In his subsequent teen years, he continued conducting productions with full orchestra of Don Pasquale, Faust, and Lucia di Lammermoor.

In the early 1990s, he co-founded the Opera Orchestra of Los Angeles, conducting critically acclaimed performances of Puccini's Turandot with Metropolitan Opera stars Ghena Dimitrova and Giuliano Ciannella. With the same orchestra, Negrini also conducted Verdi's Attila, and An Evening with Jerry Hadley – a gala concert featuring the Metropolitan Opera tenor Jerry Hadley. He would go on to conduct Los Angeles productions of Tosca, La Bohème, Madama Butterfly, and Carmen.

In 2000, Negrini conducted and produced the popular recording, Broadway Classic, featuring the renowned musical theater soprano, Lisa Vroman. In 2010, he was approached to be the resident conductor of the Opera Arts Festival in Palm Desert, California, a post he held for six seasons.

== Vocal coach ==
Negrini is an internationally respected vocal coach. He began with the USC Opera Workshop, after being offered a position as a repertoire coach there at the age of 16, and has maintained private teaching studios in Los Angeles, San Francisco and New York City. Through the years, he has coached Metropolitan Opera singers Jerry Hadley, Thomas Hampson, Suzanna Guzman, tenor Raul Hernandez, and many others. He also coached actress and Jazz singer Bettina Devin of the movie Rent, Franc D'Ambrosio of The Godfather Part III fame, TV and stage star Nancy Dussault, Broadway singing actresses Lisa Vroman, Aneka Noni Rose, Rachel Eskenazi-Gold, Karen Morrow, and the Tony Award-winning Dame Edna.

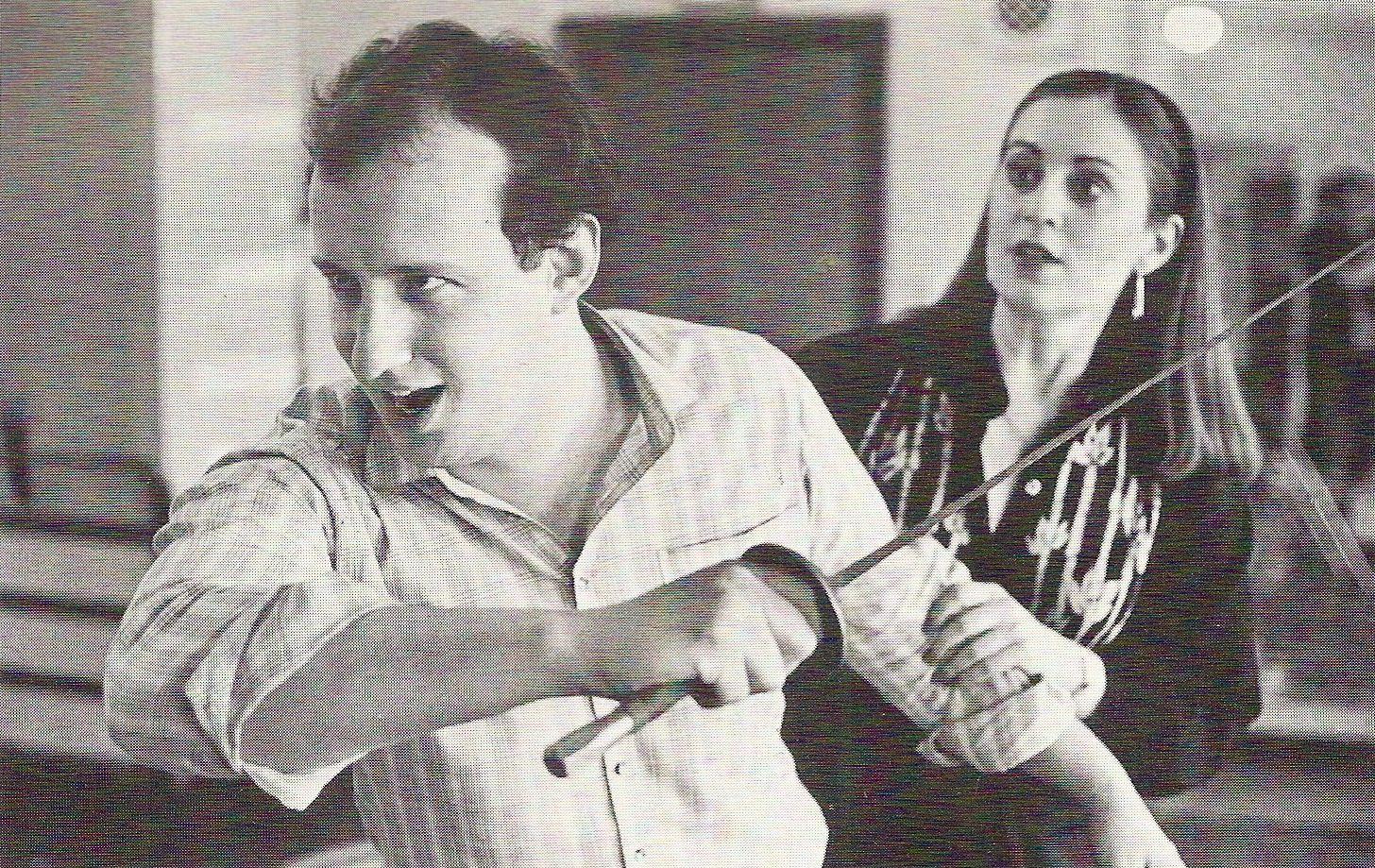
A 20-year-old Gualtiero Negrini with Sharon Graham rehearsing Il Barbiere di Siviglia at Lyric Opera of Chicago in 1980

== Singing ==
Negrini made his singing debut at age 15, as Dr. Malatesta in a production of Don Pasquale mounted by a small company known as L'Opera Comique of Los Angeles that was founded by his father. At the age of 17, he made his tenor debut as Paolino in USC Opera's production of Il Matrimonio Segreto.

Soon afterward, at age 19, he became a finalist in the 1980 Lyric Opera of Chicago auditions. There, he was mentored by Walter Baracchi, the noted pianist-conductor who had been with Lyric Opera of Chicago for a decade, and previously with Milan's La Scala since the late 1950s. This launched a professional singing career for Negrini. In Chicago, he would go on to share the stage, and learn from Luciano Pavarotti, Mirella Freni, Alfredo Kraus, Jon Vickers, and scores of other notables. Among his most successful performances were his portrayal of the "rock star" Nanki-Poo in Peter Sellars's updated production of The Mikado, and his rendition of Don Ramiro in the Gian-Carlo Menotti production of La Cenerentola at the Kennedy Center in Washington, D.C. – a role he would eventually perform over 100 times with many different opera companies. During this period he also performed the role of David in excerpts of Die Meistersinger with the Chicago Symphony Orchestra under Erich Leinsdorf.

He made history at Lyric Opera of Chicago when in 1982, at the age of 21, he replaced Gösta Winbergh as Ferrando in Così fan tutte, making him the youngest tenor ever to sing a leading role there.[1] Negrini has also been a finalist in the 1984 San Francisco Opera Auditions, where he was a member of the Merola Opera Program.

In the late 1980s, while continuing to sing throughout the United States, in such roles as Hoffmann in The Tales of Hoffmann, Lord Percy in Anna Bolena and Dick Johnson in La fanciulla del West, he was approached by Hal Prince to re-create the role of Ubaldo Piangi in Andrew Lloyd Webber's The Phantom of the Opera for its Los Angeles premiere. This would take Negrini through 8 years and over 3,000 performances of that role, in both Los Angeles and San Francisco.

With noted soprano Lisa Vroman he sang the role of Martin in Aaron Copland's The Tender Land for the Cabrillo Music Festival in 1999, and in 2000 they both sang in A Gala Vienna New Year's Eve with the San Francisco Symphony under conductor Yves Abel. In March 2010 he played Tony in Frank Loesser's The Most Happy Fella to great acclaim with the Silicon Valley Symphony (formerly San Jose Symphony), once again with Lisa Vroman as his Rosabella.

In 2011 he performed the role of William Randolph Hearst in the musical W.R. & Daisy, for which he also recorded excerpts.

In more recent years, he has appeared as a guest star on television shows such as the HBO series Curb Your Enthusiasm and the Fox Television series Bones (TV series), in roles showcasing his talents as both singer and actor. In February 2018, he will be featured in a new episode of the hit FX series Baskets, sharing the screen with Zach Galifianakis, and the Emmy Award – winning Louie Anderson.

== Film and television ==
Negrini had dabbled in filmmaking with his high school friends as a teen, even producing a few film shorts, but it would not be until 1991 that he would revisit this genre. While in Los Angeles performing in The Phantom of the Opera, he was asked to appear in period comedy The Marrying Man, starring Alec Baldwin and Kim Basinger, in a scene as Figaro in Il Barbiere di Siviglia. In 2009, he appeared as the amiable opera-singing restaurateur who is rudely interrupted by Larry David in an episode of Curb your Enthusiasm, and as an opera-singing sanitation engineer in a 2012 episode of Bones. In 2013 he began production of Fairlane Road, a slow-burning thriller in which he directed, acted, and co-wrote with Anthony Sherritt. The movie went on to be picked up by Netflix in 2016. In the last weeks of 2017, Negrini appeared on Conan (TV Show) as Donald Trump in a short sketch, and ended the year on a high note as a featured guest in the upcoming season of Baskets (TV series). His voice has also been heard in countless commercials.

== Personal life ==
Gualtiero Negrini lives just outside of Joshua Tree, California with his wife Lucy, to whom he has been married since 1989. They share three children together – Gina, Charles, and Sophia.
