= Clare Negrini =

Clare Mary Gertrude Young Negrini (1930–2006) was a Chicago woman who fell in love with an Italian Catholic priest, moved to Italy to be with him in 1951, and renounced U.S. citizenship in a bid to avoid deportation. The two married at the end of that year, resulting in their excommunication; they eventually emigrated from Italy to the United Kingdom before finally settling in Mexico. Negrini later moved back to the United States, where she lived for the rest of her life.

== Early life ==
Negrini (née Young) was born on June 21, 1930, in Cincinnati, Ohio. She was the daughter of James J. Young, a professor at Loyola University, and Eileen Brady Young. She grew up in Chicago. She met Luciano Negrini, the man who would become her husband, when he was in Chicago; the two were taking voice lessons from the same teacher. Luciano Negrini was a missionary in China, and had been sent to the United States by his bishop to raise funds to continue their work.

Young fell in love with Negrini, and asked him to marry her many times, but he initially refused, sticking to his vows as a priest. According to Young, her father was more accepting of the romance, but her mother was strongly opposed. However, her father also attempted to block the marriage by arranging for a psychiatric assessment of his daughter, in hopes that she would be found irrational and mentally incapable of contracting a marriage.

Young eventually travelled to Italy with Negrini, where the two moved into his aunt's apartment in Milan. In April, she visited the U.S. consulate in an attempt to renounce her U.S. citizenship, but foreign service officers told her that she would have to wait. Her bid for statelessness was an effort to avoid expulsion from the country, as with no means of support she could have been deported back to the United States.

== Arrest ==
In late July 1951, Young went to the Milan police headquarters to extend her visitor's permit, which was set to expire on 5 August; however, she was instead arrested and held at San Vittore Prison. One report stated this was "for reasons of public security". Another said that she had been charged with insulting a public official. Still another report said that she had falsified her birthdate in an official document and was being held for deportation. Negrini attempted to visit her to deliver a package of food, but police would not permit her to see him. He later sent his aunt, who was informed that police would release Young within a few days. He even offered to sit in jail on her behalf so that she could go free, but this was rebuffed.

Around the same time, Negrini revealed that he had been laicized. To make ends meet, he took a job as a travelling salesman with a Bologna necktie company. The couple's plight resulted in news coverage across the United States, and a sympathetic reverend at the Central Church of Christ in Salem, Oregon, even called Negrini personally to offer him a job as his assistant, but Negrini turned it down because his fiancée was happy to remain in Italy. Young was released from jail a few days later; deputy police chief Gabriele Mundo stated that an Italian psychiatrist had examined Young and found her "sane in mind and body", and that no charges would be pressed.

== Marriage paperwork ==
Young's troubles did not end with her release from prison. Her residence permit had been extended, but she still needed to complete paperwork in order to marry, which could take up to two weeks. In order to complete the formalities, she would have to provide her birth certificate and other documents. She applied to the U.S. consulate for the necessary paperwork, but by earlier September they had failed to deliver it. In an attempt to get around the paperwork requirements, she asked a Milan court for a formal declaration that she was a stateless person. With the ongoing delays, she wrote a letter to U.S. President Harry Truman asking him to determine whether or not she was stateless; she needed a certificate of citizenship status in order to proceed with the marriage.

By November, the paperwork was still pending, and Young had to obtain another extension of her permit of stay. In the meantime, she made a living by giving English lessons. In the end, the court declared her stateless, and her license to wed was finally granted in December. The two were married in December 1951 in a civil ceremony at Milan's City Hall. As a result of getting married in a civil ceremony rather than a church ceremony, both were excommunicated according to Catholic canon law at the time. Under Italian nationality law at the time, she became an Italian citizen through her marriage to Negrini.

== Emigration from Italy and later life ==
A few months after they were married, the newlywed Negrini couple moved to the United Kingdom, looking for employment as domestic workers in the London area; however, according to friends, neither was suited to that kind of job and quit within a week, and afterwards they had encountered difficulty obtaining permission to engage in other employment due to the country's strict controls on work permits for foreigners. In June 1952, their first son Italo Negrini was born at King's College Hospital in London. From London, the Negrini family moved to Chihuahua in Mexico at the invitation of an unnamed Santa Barbara, California, organization; the organization had previously hoped to bring them to the United States, but her renunciation of U.S. citizenship meant that this was not possible. In May 1953, the couple had their second son in Mexico.

Negrini eventually moved back to the United States. Her fourth son, opera singer Gualtiero Negrini, was born in Los Angeles, California in 1961. She died at her home in Los Angeles on February 16, 2006. Her husband preceded her in death. She was survived by her four sons, five grandchildren, and a great-grandson. Her funeral was held at St. Francis of Assisi, and she was interred at the San Fernando Mission Cemetery.
