= Julian Jacobs (basketball) =

American basketball player (born 1994)

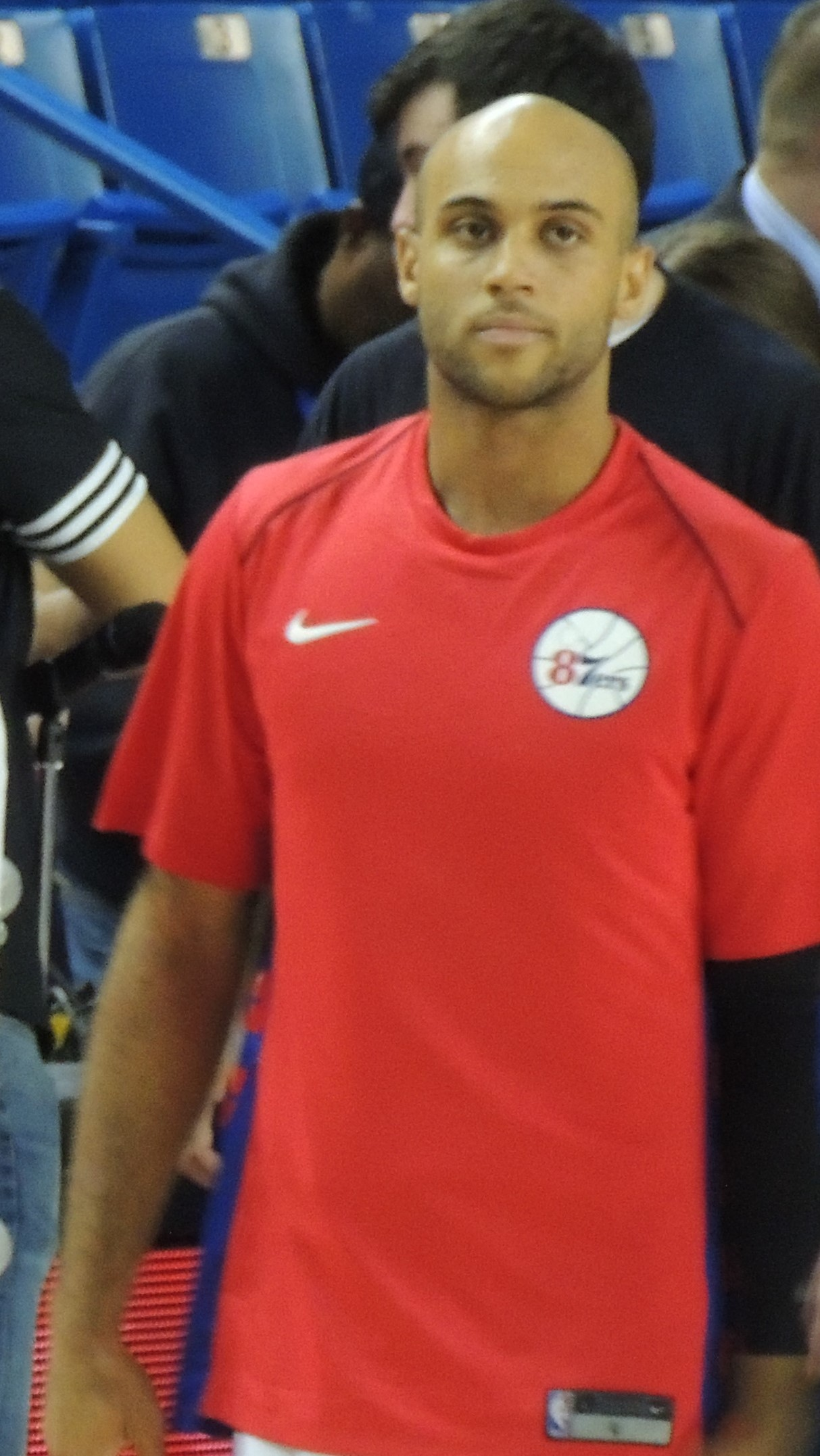

Personal information
- Born: November 23, 1994 (age 31) Las Vegas, Nevada, U.S.
- Listed height: 6 ft 4 in (1.93 m)
- Listed weight: 180 lb (82 kg)

Career information
- High school: Desert Pines (Las Vegas, Nevada)
- College: USC (2013–2016)
- NBA draft: 2016: undrafted
- Playing career: 2016–2022
- Position: Point guard

Career history
- 2016–2017: Los Angeles D-Fenders
- 2017: Delaware 87ers
- 2019: Kordall Steelers
- 2021: Woodville Warriors
- 2021–2022: Sanaye Hormozgan

Career highlights
- First-team All-Pac-12 (2016)
- Stats at Basketball Reference

Julian Marcus Andrew Jacobs (born November 23, 1994) is an American former professional basketball player. He played college basketball for the USC Trojans.

== High school career ==
Jacobs attended Desert Pines High School, where he was named the Las Vegas Review-Journal Player of the Year as a senior after averaging 16.2 points, 6.9 rebounds, 5.5 assists and 3.2 steals per game, while leading the Jaguars to a 27–3 record.

== College career ==
Jacobs played three seasons for USC. As a junior, he averaged 11.6 points, 5.4 assists, 4.9 rebounds, and 1.2 steals per game and in Pac-12 play, he averaged a conference-leading 5.5 assists per game in his final collegiate season. This earned him first-team All-Pac-12 honors. After his junior season, he declared for the NBA draft.

== Professional career ==
After going undrafted in the 2016 NBA draft, Jacobs joined the Indiana Pacers for the 2016 NBA Summer League. On September 1, 2016, he signed with the Los Angeles Lakers, but was waived on October 12 after appearing in two preseason games. On October 30, he was acquired by the Los Angeles D-Fenders of the NBA Development League as an affiliate player of the Lakers.

On August 23, 2017, Jacobs was selected by the Agua Caliente Clippers in the NBA G League expansion draft. On March 21, 2021, Jacobs was signed by the Woodville Warriors, Adelaide Australia, to play in the NBL1 Central Conference.

== Personal life ==
The son of Julie Sadler and Gary Jacobs, he has six brothers and three sisters. He says his favorite players are Derrick Rose and Rajon Rondo for their style of play.
