= Yeshiva Aharon Yaakov-Ohr Eliyahu =

Orthodox Jewish school in California, US

Coordinates: 34.069197°N 118.345328°W

Yeshiva Aharon Yaakov - Ohr Eliyahu

Location
- 241 S. Detroit St. Los Angeles 90036

Information
- Type: Private, Kindergarten-8th Grade
- Religious affiliation: Orthodox Jewish
- Information: (323) 939-3330
- Website: Official website

Yeshiva Aharon Yaakov-Ohr Eliyahu (YAYOE) is a private Orthodox Jewish day school located in the Fairfax District of Los Angeles, California.

== History ==
Ohr Eliyahu Academy, originally called the Emanuel Streisand School of the Pacific Jewish Center, was founded in the mid-1980s in Venice, California. As the school grew, Ohr Eliyahu relocated to a former Culver City public school near Kenneth Hahn State Park. After leasing the site for four years the school purchased the campus for $1.4 million in 1999.

=== New Campus ===
In April 2009, Yeshiva Aharon Yaakov - Ohr Eliyahu bought the former Daniel Murphy Catholic High School campus, located in the heavily Orthodox Jewish populated Fairfax District. The old site was sold and is now the Stoneview Nature Conservancy.

The 2010-2011 school year marked the beginning of YAYOE's use of its newly remodeled 60,000-square-foot (5,600 m^{2}) campus.

== Curriculum ==
YAYOE is accredited by the Bureau of Jewish Education and the Western Association of Schools and Colleges.

== Awards ==
Torah Umesorah awarded the school and Rabbi Shlomo Goldberg the Hersh Potok Memorial School of the Year Award and the Maurice and Goldie Rothman Award for Outstanding Educator respectively.
