= Derrick Dowell =

American former basketball player

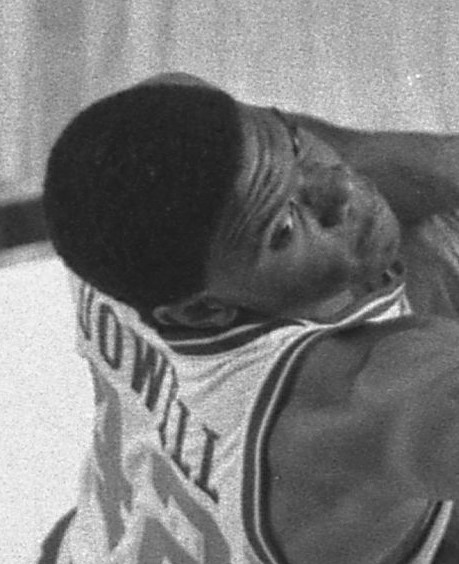
- Dowell with the USC Trojans in 1985

Personal information
- Born: September 8, 1965 (age 61) Evansville, Indiana, U.S.
- Listed height: 6 ft 6 in (1.98 m)
- Listed weight: 210 lb (95 kg)

Career information
- High school: Bosse (Evansville, Indiana)
- College: USC (1983–1987)
- NBA draft: 1987: 2nd round, 37th overall pick
- Drafted by: Washington Bullets
- Playing career: 1988–1989
- Position: Small forward / power forward

Career history
- 1988–1989: Rapid City Thrillers

Career highlights
- 2× First-team All-Pac-10 (1986, 1987)
- Stats at Basketball Reference

Derrick Dowell (born September 8, 1965) is an American former professional basketball player.

== Career ==
Dowell emerged as a promising prospect while playing for Benjamin Bosse High School in his hometown of Evansville, Indiana, leading his team to a 51–2 record during his final two years with the team. He played collegiately with the USC Trojans while earning two first-team All-Pac-10 nominations in his final two seasons.

Dowell was selected in the 1987 NBA draft by the Washington Bullets as the 37th overall pick although he never played in the National Basketball Association (NBA). He spent one season with the Rapid City Thrillers of the Continental Basketball Association (CBA) before an achilles tendon injury ended his career.

== Career statistics ==
Legend
GP	Games played	GS	Games started	MPG	Minutes per game
FG%	Field goal percentage	3P%	3-point field goal percentage	FT%	Free throw percentage
RPG	Rebounds per game	APG	Assists per game	SPG	Steals per game
BPG	Blocks per game	PPG	Points per game	**Bold**	Career high

=== College ===
Year	Team	GP	GS	MPG	FG%	3P%	FT%	RPG	APG	SPG	BPG	PPG
1983–84	USC	27	10	22.4	.434	–	.600	4.6	1.1	1.2	.6	6.4
1984–85	USC	**29**	–	32.0	**.560**	–	.617	8.3	2.0	1.6	.4	11.6
1985–86	USC	25	19	31.0	.519	–	**.698**	7.8	1.8	1.5	**.7**	15.5
1986–87	USC	28	**28**	**36.8**	.491	**.273**	.630	**8.8**	**2.3**	**2.2**	.3	**20.9**
Career		109	57	30.6	.504	.273	.640	7.4	1.8	1.6	.5	13.6

== Personal life ==
Dowell's sister, Cheryl, was a fellow basketball standout at Bosse High School and played for the Long Beach State 49ers. His daughter, Jalaya, plays college basketball for the Oakland City Mighty Oaks and previously for the Bellarmine Knights.
