= 1984–85 USC Trojans men's basketball team =

American college basketball season

1984–85 USC Trojans men's basketball

Pacific-10 Conference Co-champions

NCAA tournament, First Round
- Conference: Pacific-10 Conference
- Record: 19–10 (13–5 Pac-10)
- Head coach: Stan Morrison (6th season)
- Home arena: L. A. Sports Arena

1984–85 Pacific-10 Conference men's basketball standings
	Conf.				Overall
Team	W		L	PCT	W		L	PCT
Washington	13	–	5	.722	22	–	10	.688
USC	13	–	5	.722	19	–	10	.655
Oregon State	12	–	6	.667	22	–	9	.710
Arizona	12	–	6	.667	21	–	10	.677
UCLA	12	–	6	.667	21	–	12	.636
Oregon	8	–	10	.444	15	–	16	.484
Arizona State	7	–	11	.389	12	–	16	.429
Washington State	5	–	13	.278	13	–	15	.464
California	5	–	13	.278	13	–	15	.464
Stanford	3	–	15	.167	11	–	17	.393
As of November 25, 2011; Rankings from AP Poll

The 1984–85 USC Trojans men's basketball team represented the University of Southern California during the 1984–85 NCAA Division I men's basketball season. Led by head coach Stan Morrison, they played their home games at the L. A. Sports Arena in Los Angeles, California as members of the Pac-10 Conference. The Trojans were 13–5 in the Pac-10 and, after falling to Oregon State at home in the regular season finale, shared the conference championship with Washington. USC received a bid to the NCAA tournament as No. 8 seed in the Midwest region where they fell to Illinois State in the opening round.

Senior forward Wayne Carlander was named Pac-10 Player of the Year and First-team All-conference in back-to-back seasons.

== Previous season ==
The 1983–84 USC Trojans men's basketball team finished 8th in the Pac-10 standings at 6–12. The team's overall record was 11–20 in head coach Stan Morrison's fifth season at the helm. Junior forward Wayne Carlander was recognized as a First-team All-conference performer.

== Roster ==
1984–85 USC Trojans men's basketball team
Players
Coaches

Pos.	#	Name	Height	Weight	Year	Previous school	Hometown
G		Larry Friend	5 ft 11 in (1.8 m)	—	Jr
G		Ron Holmes	6 ft 5 in (1.96 m)	—	Sr
F	42	Derrick Dowell	6 ft 6 in (1.98 m)	205 lb (93 kg)	So	Bosse	Evansville, IN
C		Rod Keller	6 ft 9 in (2.06 m)	—	So
F	52	Wayne Carlander	6 ft 6 in (1.98 m)	220 lb (100 kg)	Sr	Ocean View	Huntington Beach, CA

Head coach

- Stan Morrison (California)

Assistant coach(es)

Legend

- (C) Team captain
- (S) Suspended
- (I) Ineligible
- (W) Walk-on
- Injured
- Current redshirt

== Schedule and results ==
Date time, TV	Rank^{#}	Opponent^{#}	Result	Record	Site (attendance) city, state
Non-conference regular season
Nov 30, 1984*		vs. Southern Miss	W 73–72	1–0	Mid-South Coliseum; Memphis, Tennessee
Dec 1, 1984*		at No. 5 Memphis State	L 45–61	1–1	Mid-South Coliseum; Memphis, Tennessee
Dec 4, 1984*		Wyoming	W 67–57	2–1	L.A. Sports Arena; Los Angeles, California
Dec 7, 1984*		vs. Texas Tech	L 59–63	2–2	
Dec 8, 1984*		vs. Boston University	W 83–70	3–2	
Dec 12, 1984*		Arkansas–Little Rock	W 76–68	4–2	L.A. Sports Arena; Los Angeles, California
Dec 22, 1984*		Utah	W 78–65	5–2	L.A. Sports Arena; Los Angeles, California
Dec 28, 1984*		The Citadel; Trojan-Bud Light Classic	W 95–62	6–2	L.A. Sports Arena; Los Angeles, California
Dec 29, 1984*		No. 2 Duke; Trojan-Bud Light Classic	L 73–75	6–3	L.A. Sports Arena; Los Angeles, California
Pac-10 regular season
Jan 3, 1985*		at Oregon	W 63–59	7–3 (1–0)	McArthur Court; Eugene, Oregon
Jan 10, 1985		Washington	L 50–66	7–4 (1–1)	L.A. Sports Arena; Los Angeles, California
Jan 12, 1985		Washington State	W 69–62	8–4 (2–1)	L.A. Sports Arena; Los Angeles, California
Jan 17, 1985		at Arizona	W 64–63	9–4 (3–1)	McKale Center; Tucson, Arizona
Jan 19, 1985		at Arizona State	W 73–54	10–4 (4–1)	ASU Activity Center; Tempe, Arizona
Jan 26, 1985		California	W 86–80	11–4 (5–1)	L.A. Sports Arena; Los Angeles, California
Jan 28, 1985		Stanford	L 54–60	11–5 (5–2)	L.A. Sports Arena; Los Angeles, California
Feb 1, 1985		UCLA	W 78–77	12–5 (6–2)	L.A. Sports Arena; Los Angeles, California
Feb 4, 1985		at No. 16 Oregon State	W 60–58	13–5 (7–2)	Gill Coliseum; Corvallis, Oregon
Feb 7, 1985		at Washington	W 61–50	14–5 (8–2)	Hec Edmundson Pavilion; Seattle, Washington
Feb 9, 1985		at Washington State	W 64–58	15–5 (9–2)	Friel Court; Pullman, Washington
Feb 14, 1985		Arizona State	W 76–60	16–5 (10–2)	L.A. Sports Arena; Los Angeles, California
Feb 16, 1985		Arizona	L 55–60	16–6 (10–3)	L.A. Sports Arena; Los Angeles, California
Feb 21, 1985		at Stanford	L 65–86	16–7 (10–4)	Maples Pavilion; Stanford, California
Feb 23, 1985		at California	W 75–52	17–7 (11–4)	Harmon Gym; Berkeley, California
Feb 28, 1985		at UCLA	W 80–78	18–7 (12–4)	Pauley Pavilion; Los Angeles, California
Mar 3, 1985*		at Texas	L 70–71	18–8	Frank Erwin Center; Austin, Texas
Mar 7, 1985		Oregon	W 65–62	19–8 (13–4)	L.A. Sports Arena; Los Angeles, California
Mar 9, 1985		Oregon State	L 58–60	19–9 (13–5)	L.A. Sports Arena; Los Angeles, California
NCAA Tournament
Mar 14, 1985*	(8 MW)	vs. (9 MW) Illinois State; First round	L 55–58	19–10	Mabee Center (10,575); Tulsa, Oklahoma
*Non-conference game. ^{#}Rankings from AP Poll. (#) Tournament seedings in parentheses. All times are in Pacific Time.

== Awards and honors ==
- Wayne Carlander – Pac-10 Player of the Year
