= Jeff Trepagnier =

American basketball player (born 1979)

Personal information
- Born: July 11, 1979 (age 47) Los Angeles, California, U.S.
- Listed height: 6 ft 4 in (1.93 m)
- Listed weight: 200 lb (91 kg)

Career information
- High school: Compton (Compton, California)
- College: USC (1997–2001)
- NBA draft: 2001: 2nd round, 35th overall pick
- Drafted by: Cleveland Cavaliers
- Playing career: 2001–2013
- Position: Shooting guard
- Number: 3, 20, 4

Career history
- 2001–2002: Cleveland Cavaliers
- 2002–2003: Asheville Altitude
- 2003–2004: Denver Nuggets
- 2004–2005: Basket Napoli
- 2005–2006: Ülkerspor
- 2006–2007: Basket Napoli
- 2008: Pau-Orthez
- 2008–2009: Bakersfield Jam
- 2009: Rio Grande Valley Vipers
- 2009: Hollywood Jammers
- 2009–2010: Iowa Energy
- 2010–2011: Scaligera Verona
- 2012: Liga Sorocabana
- 2012–2013: Los Angeles Slam

Career highlights
- EuroLeague steals leader (2006); All-NBDL First Team (2003)
- Stats at NBA.com
- Stats at Basketball Reference

Jeffery Trepagnier (born July 11, 1979) is an American former professional basketball player.

== Early life ==
Trepagnier played basketball at Compton High School, in Compton, California.

== College career ==
Trepagnier played college basketball for the USC Trojans. He also took second place at the 2000 Pac-10 Championships for the second year in a row with a high jump of 7-foot-1, tying for the fifth-best jump in USC school history.

== Professional career ==
Trepagnier was a second round draft pick of the Cleveland Cavaliers in the 2001 NBA draft. At 6'4", Trepagnier was considered by some scouts to be undersized for the NBA shooting guard position, his natural spot. Trepagnier only played in 31 total NBA career games (12 for the Cavaliers and 19 for the Denver Nuggets) and averaged 2.8 points and 1.4 rebounds per game in his career. His final NBA game was played on April 14, 2004, in a 67 - 93 loss to the San Antonio Spurs. In his final game, Trepagnier played for 7 minutes and recorded 1 assist, 1 rebound but no points.

He spent the 2004–05 season for Italian club Eldo Napoli. He signed with the Knights on June 25, 2006.

Trepagnier signed a contract with French club Élan Béarnais Pau-Orthez in December 2007.

In 2009, Trepagnier was playing for the Iowa Energy of the NBA D-League.

In 2010, he joined Scaligera Verona of the Italian second league.

In 2011, he signed to play in Brazil.

He later joined the Los Angeles Slam of the ABA.

== Personal ==
Born in Los Angeles, Trepagnier is of African-American descent.
