= Rich Glas =

American basketball coach (born 1948)

Biographical details
- Born: April 30, 1948 (age 78); Bemidji, Minnesota, U.S.

Playing career
- 1966–1970: Bemidji State

Coaching career (HC unless noted)
- 1970–1971: Western Illinois (assistant)
- 1972–1974: Minnesota Morris (assistant)
- 1974–1979: Minnesota Morris
- 1979–1984: Willamette
- 1984–1985: Arizona (assistant)
- 1985–1988: Hawaii (assistant)
- 1988–2006: North Dakota
- 2006–2007: Northern Iowa (associate HC)
- 2008–2017: Concordia (Moorhead)

Administrative career (AD unless noted)
- 1981–1984: Willamette
- 2007–2008: Northern Iowa (director of basketball operations)

Head coaching record
- Overall: 608–413 (.595)
- Tournaments: 11–8 (NCAA Division II); 1–3 (NCAA Division III)

Accomplishments and honors

Championships
- 2× NIC (1977, 1978); 3× NCC regular season (1990, 1991, 1995); 3× NCC Tournament (1992–1994)

Awards
- 2× NIC Coach of the Year (1977, 1978); 2× Kodak/NABC Division II North Central Region Coach of the Year (1990, 1991)

Richard Alexander Glas (born April 30, 1948) is an American basketball coach who was most recently the head men's basketball coach at Concordia College in Moorhead, Minnesota. In a coaching career that spanned 1970 to 2017, Glas had various assistant and head coaching positions in college basketball and was head coach at Minnesota Morris from 1974 to 1979, Willamette from 1979 to 1984, North Dakota from 1988 to 2006, and Concordia from 2008 to 2017.

== Early life and education ==
Born in Bemidji, Minnesota, Glas attended Bemidji State University, where he played basketball for the Bemidji State Beavers from 1966 to 1970. Glas graduated from Bemidji State with a bachelor's degree in physical education in 1970 and completed a master's degree in education at Western Illinois University in 1971.

== Coaching career ==
=== Early coaching career (1970–1974) ===
Glas had his first coaching job during the 1970–71 season as an assistant at Western Illinois. From 1971 to 1974, Glas was an assistant coach at Minnesota Morris under Jack Haddorff.

=== Minnesota Morris (1974–1979) ===
Following the retirement of Haddorff, Glas was promoted to head coach at Minnesota Morris in 1974. Glas had 27 wins in his first two seasons before a 21–6 season in 1976–77 with a Northern Intercollegiate Conference (NIC) title. Upon moving from the NAIA to NCAA Division III in 1977–78, Minnesota Morris went 22–6 with another NIC title and an appearance in the NCAA tournament. The NCC honored Glas with Coach of the Year honors in 1977 and 1978.

=== Willamette (1979–1984) ===
Glas's next coaching stop was on the West Coast. From 1979 to 1984, Glas was head coach at Willamette University in Salem, Oregon. He was not as successful there, going 66–64 in five seasons with only one winning season in 1982–83 at 19–8.

=== Hawaii and Arizona assistant (1984–1988) ===
After Willamette, Glas remained on the West Coast and got his first NCAA Division I job as an assistant coach at Arizona in the 1984–85 season under Lute Olson. Arizona went 21–10 that season.

With a recommendation from Olson, Glas was hired to an open assistant coaching position at Hawaii under new head coach Frank Arnold in 1985. Arnold left Hawaii after two seasons and an 11–45 record. Glas was retained by new head coach Riley Wallace for the 1987–88 season, during which Hawaii went 4–25.

=== North Dakota (1988–2006) ===
From 1988 to 2006, Glas was head coach at North Dakota. In his first season, North Dakota finished last in the North Central Conference (NCC), but the next season, the 1989–90 team won the NCC regular season title and advanced to the Elite Eight of the NCAA Division II tournament. That team was the first of six consecutive seasons with NCC regular season or tournament titles and NCAA Tournament appearances. In 1990 and 1991, Glas was the Kodak/National Association of Basketball Coaches Division II Coach of the Year for the North Central Region. North Dakota also appeared in the 2000 and 2003 NCAA Tournaments.

After 18 seasons, Glas ended his career at North Dakota with a 335–194 record, eight NCAA Division II Tournament appearances, and the most wins in school history (335).

=== Northern Iowa assistant (2006–2008) ===
On April 26, 2006, Glas resigned from North Dakota to accept a job offer at Northern Iowa to be associate head coach under Ben Jacobson. The 2006–07 Northern Iowa team had an 18–13 record. The following season, Glas was reassigned to director of basketball operations. The 2007–08 Northern Iowa team went 18–14.

=== Concordia (2008–2017) ===
Glas concluded his coaching career at Concordia College, a Division III college in Moorhead, Minnesota. In nine seasons from 2008 to 2017, he had a 118–111 record. His best team was in 2012–13 with an 18–8 record and second-place finish in the Minnesota Intercollegiate Athletic Conference standings. On December 19, 2016, Glas announced his retirement effective at the end of the season.

== Personal life ==
Glas is married with two children. He and his wife have lived in Nevis, Minnesota since 2017.

== Head coaching record ==
Record table
| Season | Team | Overall | Conference | Standing | Postseason |
|---|---|---|---|---|---|
Minnesota Morris Cougars (Northern Intercollegiate Conference) (1974–1979)
| 1974–75 | Minnesota Morris | 13–13 | 5–7 | T–3rd | |
| 1975–76 | Minnesota Morris | 14–10 | 7–5 | 4th | |
| 1976–77 | Minnesota Morris | 21–6 | 12–2 | 1st | NAIA District 13 Final |
| 1977–78 | Minnesota Morris | 22–6 | 12–2 | 1st | NCAA Division III regional final |
| 1978–79 | Minnesota Morris | 19–9 | 11–5 | T–2nd | NCAA Division III Regional Fourth Place |
| Minnesota Morris: | | 89–44 (.669) | 47–21 (.691) | | |
Willamette Bearcats (Northwest Conference) (1979–1984)
| 1979–80 | Willamette | 12–13 | 6–6 | T–3rd | |
| 1980–81 | Willamette | 13–13 | 6–6 | T–3rd | |
| 1981–82 | Willamette | 12–14 | 6–6 | T–4th | |
| 1982–83 | Willamette | 19–8 | 9–3 | 2nd | |
| 1983–84 | Willamette | 10–16 | 3–9 | 6th | |
| Willamette: | | 66–64 (.508) | 30–30 (.500) | | |
North Dakota Fighting Sioux (North Central Conference) (1988–2006)
| 1988–89 | North Dakota | 8–20 | 3–15 | 10th | |
| 1989–90 | North Dakota | 28–7 | 14–4 | 1st | NCAA Division II Third Place |
| 1990–91 | North Dakota | 29–4 | 17–1 | 1st | NCAA Division II Elite Eight |
| 1991–92 | North Dakota | 23–9 | 10–8 | 4th | NCAA Division II Regional Third Place |
| 1992–93 | North Dakota | 23–8 | 13–5 | 2nd | NCAA Division II regional final |
| 1993–94 | North Dakota | 23–9 | 11–7 | T–3rd | NCAA Division II Regional Third Place |
| 1994–95 | North Dakota | 19–9 | 12–6 | T–1st | NCAA Division II first round |
| 1995–96 | North Dakota | 15–12 | 9–9 | 6th | |
| 1996–97 | North Dakota | 11–16 | 5–13 | 9th | |
| 1997–98 | North Dakota | 14–13 | 7–11 | T–7th | |
| 1998–99 | North Dakota | 17–10 | 11–7 | 3rd | |
| 1999–2000 | North Dakota | 24–9 | 11–7 | 3rd | NCAA Division II Regional semifinal |
| 2000–01 | North Dakota | 16–11 | 9–9 | T–5th | |
| 2001–02 | North Dakota | 19–10 | 12–6 | T–3rd | |
| 2002–03 | North Dakota | 20–9 | 11–5 | 3rd | NCAA Division II first round |
| 2003–04 | North Dakota | 14–14 | 5–7 | 7th | |
| 2004–05 | North Dakota | 20–10 | 6–6 | 5th | |
| 2005–06 | North Dakota | 13–15 | 4–8 | T–6th | |
| North Dakota: | | 335–194 (.633) | 170–136 (.556) | | |
Concordia Cobbers (Minnesota Intercollegiate Athletic Conference) (2008–2017)
| 2008–09 | Concordia (Moorhead) | 11–14 | 8–12 | T–7th | |
| 2009–10 | Concordia (Moorhead) | 13–12 | 9–11 | 7th | |
| 2010–11 | Concordia (Moorhead) | 14–12 | 10–10 | T–6th | |
| 2011–12 | Concordia (Moorhead) | 7–18 | 5–15 | T–9th | |
| 2012–13 | Concordia (Moorhead) | 18–8 | 15–5 | 2nd | |
| 2013–14 | Concordia (Moorhead) | 12–13 | 8–12 | 7th | |
| 2014–15 | Concordia (Moorhead) | 15–11 | 11–9 | 5th | |
| 2015–16 | Concordia (Moorhead) | 16–10 | 13–7 | T–3rd | |
| 2016–17 | Concordia (Moorhead) | 12–13 | 9–11 | T–7th | |
| Concordia (Moorhead): | | 118–111 (.515) | 88–92 (.489) | | |
| Total: | | 608–413 (.595) | | | |
National champion Postseason invitational champion Conference regular season champion Conference regular season and conference tournament champion Division regular season champion Division regular season and conference tournament champion Conference tournament champion
