= Bishop Montgomery High School =

Religious high school in Torrance, California, United States

Location
- 5430 Torrance Boulevard; Torrance, (Los Angeles County), California 90503; United States
- Coordinates: 33°50′14″N 118°22′20″W

Information
- Type: Private, College-prep
- Motto: Justice, Truth, and Honor
- Religious affiliation: Roman Catholic
- Established: 1957
- Principal: Michele Starkey
- Grades: 9-12
- Gender: Coeducational
- Enrollment: 1104 (2009)
- Campus size: 24 acres (97,000 m^{2})
- Colors: Black and gold
- Athletics conference: CIF Southern Section; Camino Del Rey Association
- Nickname: Knights
- Accreditation: Western Association of Schools and Colleges
- Newspaper: Knightlife
- Website: http://www.bmhs-la.org

Bishop Montgomery High School is a Catholic high school serving twenty-five parishes in the Archdiocese of Los Angeles. BMHS was founded in 1957, and staffed by the Sisters of St. Joseph of Carondelet, Conventual Franciscans, and lay faculty. The 24-acre (97,000 m^{2}) campus is located in Torrance, California, in southwest Los Angeles County, one mile (1.6 km) from the Pacific Ocean and the Del Amo Mall. The coeducational student body is approximately 900 students in grades 9 through 12, making BMHS the sixth largest private high school in Los Angeles County.

The school is named for the first American-born Bishop of Monterey-Los Angeles, George Thomas Montgomery. As the ordinary of the diocese from 1896 to 1902, Montgomery demanded that government recognize the right of parents to send their children to schools of their choice.

BMHS is accredited by the Western Association of Schools and Colleges (WASC) and offers a comprehensive college preparatory curriculum combined with Christian values. Advanced Placement courses are offered in all major subjects, and 98 percent of graduates pursue higher education.

== Athletics ==
Bishop Montgomery competes in most high school sports, playing in the California Interscholastic Federation (CIF) Del Rey League against Bishop Amat (La Puente), St. Bernard (Playa del Rey), St. Paul (Santa Fe Springs), and Junipero Serra (Gardena). Other local rivals include Torrance High School, St. John Bosco (Bellflower), and St. Joseph (Lakewood). BMHS has been particularly successful in its basketball and volleyball programs, frequently appearing in the California state quarterfinals or higher. The schools Track and Field program has also had success and produced notable athletes. The school's teams go by the name "The Knights", and the team colors are black and gold.

The following sports are offered at Bishop Montgomery: Football, Volleyball, Softball, Soccer, Cross country, Track and Field, Golf, Tennis, Basketball, Baseball, Swimming, Song Team, Pep flags / Short Flags, Surf, eSports.

== Notable alumni ==
- Nnamdi Asomugha, All-Pro NFL cornerback, actor, producer (sophomore year only)
- Denise Austin, fitness pioneer (Class of 1975)
- Justin Bibbins, basketball player who plays professionally in Italy (Class of 2014)
- Bill Bordley, former Major League Baseball pitcher (Class of 1976)
- Marine Cano, former professional soccer player (Class of 1972)
- Errick Craven, professional basketball player in the French Ligue Nationale de Basketball (Class of 2001)
- Chris Engen, television actor (Class of 1997)
- Dreux Frederic (Lil' Fizz), rapper from B2K (attended freshman year, 1999–2000)
- Tyler Harvey, basketball player
- Solomon Hughes, actor
- Carmelita Jeter, gold-medalist sprinter (Class of 1998)
- Richard T. Jones, actor
- Brandon Lee, actor (freshman year only)
- Michael Mendoza, American football player
- Patricia Neske, former German figure skater (Class of 1984)
- Lessa Kananiʻopua Pelayo-Lozada, president of the American Library Association (class of 2003)
- Terrance Pennington, free-agent offensive tackle in the NFL, formerly with the Buffalo Bills (Class of 2001)
- Noelle Quinn, UCLA women's basketball player, formerly in the WNBA with the Los Angeles Sparks and Seattle Storm, current head coach with the Seattle Storm (Class of 2003)
- Sigi Schmid, head coach, MLS Seattle Sounders and US Soccer hall of fame member. (Class of 1971)
- Omarr Smith, current Arena Football League defensive back with the San Jose SaberCats (Class of 1995)
- Ethan Thompson, Basketball player for the Oregon State Beavers (Class of 2017)
- Stevie Thompson, basketball player in the Israeli Basketball Premier League (Class of 2015)
- Stanley Wilson, NFL cornerback with the Detroit Lions (Class of 2000)
