= Francis St. Paul =

American gridiron football player (born 1979)

Profile
- Position: Wide receiver

Personal information
- Born: April 25, 1979 (age 47); Los Angeles, California, U.S.
- Listed height: 5 ft 9 in (1.75 m)
- Listed weight: 180 lb (82 kg)

Career information
- High school: Los Angeles (CA) Daniel Murphy
- College: Northern Arizona
- NFL draft: 2001: 6th round, 197th overall pick

Career history
- 2001–2002: St. Louis Rams*
- 2002: Pittsburgh Steelers*
- 2002: St. Louis Rams*
- 2003: Jacksonville Jaguars*
- 2003: Carolina Panthers*
- 2004: Ottawa Renegades*
- * Offseason or practice squad member only

Francis St. Paul (born April 25, 1979) is an American former professional football wide receiver who was drafted from Northern Arizona University in the 2001 NFL draft by the St. Louis Rams. He spent two seasons with the Rams on their active roster and practice squad. He also spent time on the Pittsburgh Steelers practice squad. He was on the Jacksonville Jaguars preseason roster before signing with the Carolina Panthers in 2003.

== Early life ==
St. Paul is an alumnus of Daniel Murphy High School, a Roman Catholic high school in Los Angeles, California. At Daniel Murphy, he lettered four times in football and three times in both basketball and track. In 1997, he was CIF Div 4 100 and 200 meters champion.

== College career ==
St. Paul finished his career among the all-time receivers in school history, ranking second in touchdowns (19), ninth in receptions (113) and 10th in receiving yards (1,617). St.Paul also ran track at Northern Arizona. In 2000, he was the Big Sky Conference 100 meters champion (10.48).

== Professional career ==
He was a sixth-round pick of the St. Louis Rams in the 2001 NFL Draft, playing with the Rams on the active roster and practice squad over two seasons including Super Bowl XXXVI in New Orleans. He also had stints with the Pittsburgh Steelers, Carolina Panthers and Jacksonville Jaguars.

On March 5, 2004, St. Paul signed with the Ottawa Renegades of the Canadian Football League. St. Paul was a subsequent training camp cut on June 5, 2004.

== Coaching and scouting career ==
=== Northern Arizona ===
On May 5, 2007, St. Paul was hired as a graduate assistant wide receivers coach at Northern Arizona. In March of the following year, he was promoted to the full-time position as the wide receivers coach. St. Paul also served as the pro liaison for the staff and coordinated the summer camps. During his career at Northern Arizona, St. Paul coached three of the top six single-season receiving leaders in school history while the team has ranked among the top 30 in the nation in passing offense for four straight seasons, including fifth overall in the FCS in passing and total offense in 2009. In addition, his receivers helped the Lumberjacks post the top passing efficiency mark in the Big Sky and rank sixth overall in the nation in 2011. St. Paul is also responsible for developing Khalil Paden in 2011 to a career season. He was an All-Big Sky honorable mention selection, leading the team with 61 receptions, 991 receiving yards and eight touchdowns. Overall, he ranked fifth in the Big Sky in receptions and receiving yards per game.

=== Chicago Bears ===
In 2012, St. Paul resigned from his position as the wide receivers coach at NAU and became a west area scout for the Chicago Bears. He was responsible for the states of California, Oregon, Washington, Idaho, Montana, Utah, Arizona and Nevada.

On May 16, 2024, St. Paul was promoted to the role of assistant director of college scouting.
