= Errick Craven =

Ivorian-American basketball player

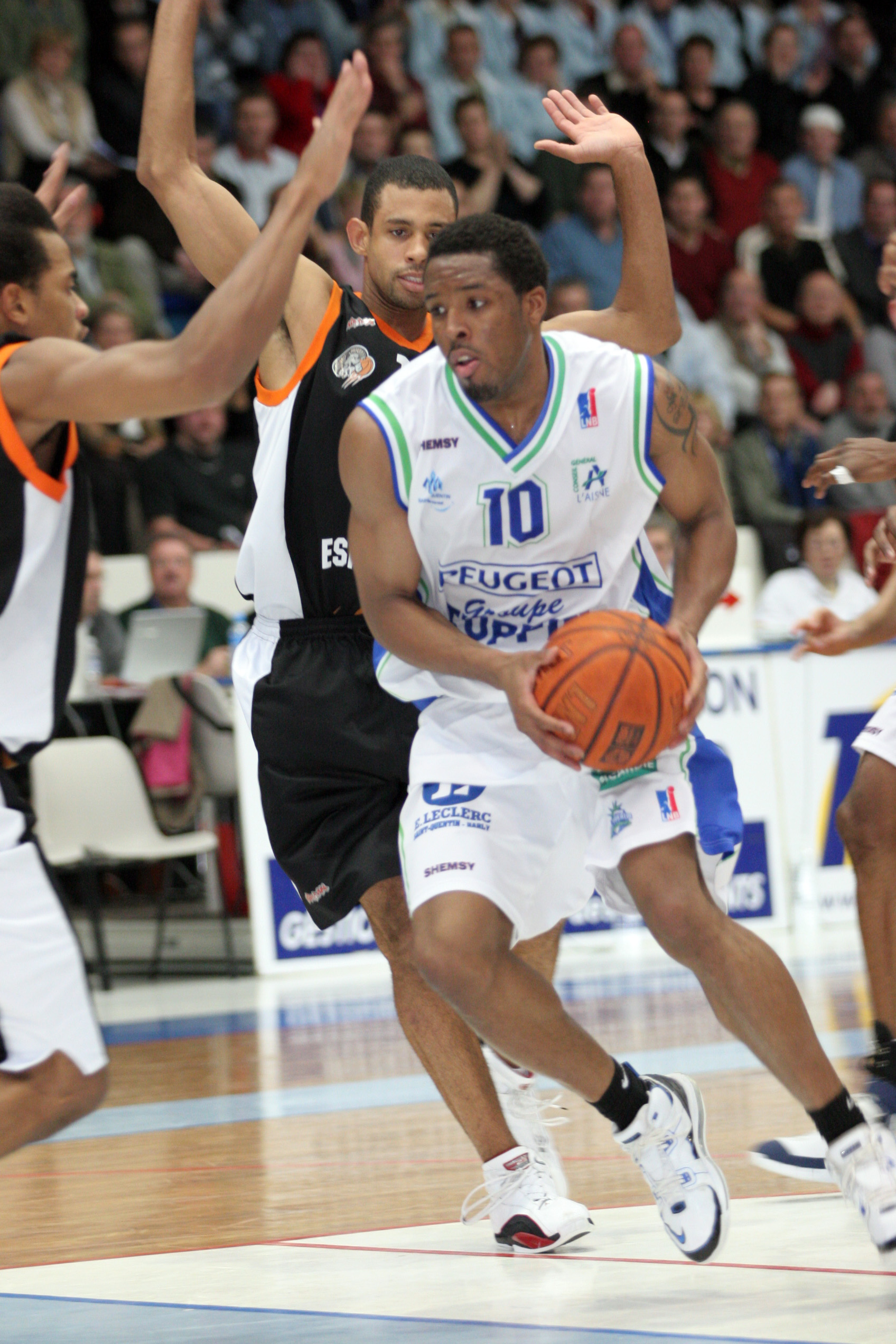
- Craven in 2006

Personal information
- Born: July 4, 1983 (age 43) Carson, California, U.S.
- Listed height: 6 ft 2 in (1.88 m)
- Listed weight: 205 lb (93 kg)

Career information
- High school: Bishop Montgomery (Torrance, California)
- College: USC (2001–2005)
- Playing career: 2005–2015
- Position: Point guard / shooting guard

Career history
- 2005–2006: TTNet Beykoz
- 2006–2007: Saint-Quentin
- 2007–2008: Los Angeles D-Fenders
- 2008: Cocodrilos de Caracas
- 2008–2009: Stade Clermontois BA
- 2009: JDA Dijon
- 2009–2010: Boulazac
- 2010–2011: JDA Dijon
- 2011–2012: JA Vichy
- 2012–2013: SVBD
- 2014–2015: JSA Bordeaux

Career highlights
- French 2nd Division Foreign Player's MVP (2009); LNB Pro B Best Scorer (2009)

Errick Craven (born July 4, 1983) is an Ivorian-American former professional basketball player. He was also a member of the Côte d'Ivoire national basketball team.

== High school ==
Craven was a local high school basketball star. He led his high school team to two straight California Division III titles, at Bishop Montgomery High School. He was named the co-CIF Division III player of the year, in both his junior and senior seasons, along with his twin brother Derrick.

== College career ==
Along with his twin brother, Derrick, Craven played four years of college basketball at the University of Southern California, with the USC Trojans, from 2001 to 2005. Craven was a four-year starter at USC, and he led the Pac-10 Conference in steals in each of his first three years, before an injury-filled senior season. Craven finished his career 19th in scoring, 15th in three-point shooting, and second in steals on the USC charts.

== Professional career ==
Following his college career, Craven played for the Dallas Mavericks' NBA Summer League team, before continuing his career overseas. Craven played professional basketball in Turkey, Venezuela, the NBA D-League, and in France. He spent the 2008–09 season with Stade Clermontois BA of the French 2nd Division, and he averaged 19.6 points per game, to go along with his average of three steals per game.

== National team career ==
Craven was a member of the senior Côte d'Ivoire national basketball team that won the silver medal at the 2009 FIBA Africa Championship, to earn its first FIBA World Championship berth since 1986.

== Personal life ==
Craven was born in Carson, California, on 4 July 1983. Craven attended The Thomas J. Long School of Pharmacy, at the University of the Pacific, in order to pursue a career in pharmacy.
