= Sam Clancy Jr. =

American basketball player (born 1980)

Personal information
- Born: May 4, 1980 (age 46) Pittsburgh, Pennsylvania, U.S.
- Listed height: 6 ft 7 in (2.01 m)
- Listed weight: 260 lb (118 kg)

Career information
- High school: St. Edward (Lakewood, Ohio)
- College: USC (1998–2002)
- NBA draft: 2002: 2nd round, 45th overall pick
- Drafted by: Philadelphia 76ers
- Playing career: 2002–2021
- Position: Power forward / center

Career history

Playing
- 2003: Fayetteville Patriots
- 2003–2004: Yakima Sun Kings
- 2004: Cocodrilos de Caracas
- 2004–2005: Idaho Stampede
- 2005: Valladolid
- 2005: Cocodrilos de Caracas
- 2006: UNICS Kazan
- 2006–2007: Menorca Bàsquet
- 2007: Incheon ET Land Black Slamer
- 2007–2008: Le Mans Sarthe
- 2008–2009: CSK VVS Samara
- 2009–2010: Bnei HaSharon
- 2010–2011: Hapoel Jerusalem
- 2011: Gallitos de Isabela
- 2011: Southeast Hoopstars
- 2011–2012: Atenas de Córdoba
- 2012: 9 de Julio de Río Tercero
- 2012–2013: Ciclista Olímpico
- 2013: Marinos de Anzoátegui
- 2013–2016: Gimnasia Indalo
- 2016–2020: Instituto Atlético Central Córdoba

Coaching
- 2023– July 2025: Cleveland Charge (assistant)

Career highlights
- 3× Liga Nacional de Básquet rebounding leader (2013–2015); CBA Most Valuable Player (2005); CBA All-Star (2005); All-CBA First Team (2005); CBA Defensive Player of the Year (2005); CBA All-Defensive Team (2005); Consensus second-team All-American (2002); Pac-10 Player of the Year (2002); 2× First-team All-Pac-10 (2001, 2002); Fourth-team Parade All-American (1998)
- Stats at Basketball Reference

Sam Clancy Jr. (born May 4, 1980) is an American former professional basketball player who is an assistant coach. He was signed with the NBA's Portland Trail Blazers and Philadelphia 76ers; however, he never played a game for either team. He was injured as a member of the 76ers, and was waived by the Blazers. He is 6 ft 7 in tall and he weighs 118 kg (260 pounds) and used to play at the position of forward-center.

== Amateur career ==
His father, Sam Clancy Sr., played basketball at University of Pittsburgh, and went on to play defensive end in the NFL for Seattle Seahawks, Cleveland Browns and Indianapolis Colts. Sam Jr. was born while Sam Sr. was still at Pitt. During his stint with the Browns, Sam Sr. kept a home in the southern Cleveland suburb of Strongsville, OH.

Accordingly, the young Clancy attended St. Edward High School, located in nearby Lakewood, Ohio. He starred alongside Steve Logan, leading St. Edward to the 1998 Ohio High School Athletic Association State "big school" basketball championship during their senior year. He graduated in 1998. In 2009, St. Edward named Clancy to the school's Athletic Hall of Fame.

Clancy attended University of Southern California, majoring in sociology, and played basketball for the Trojans. After the 2001 season, he declared for the 2001 NBA draft. However, he never signed with an agent and withdrew his name from consideration prior to the draft. In 2002, which was his senior year, he was named the Pac-10 Player of the Year and Associated Press second team All-American. He finished his USC career as the all-time leader in blocked shots (195), third all-time in points (1,657), second in rebounds (839), second in fouls (1193) and fifth in steals (134).

In March 2016 Clancy was inducted into the Pac-12 Men's Basketball Hall of Honor, during a ceremony prior to the championship game at the 2016 Pac-12 Men's Basketball Tournament held at the MGM Grand Garden Arena in Las Vegas, Nevada.

== Pro career ==
After his college career, Clancy was selected by the Philadelphia 76ers with the 45th pick (in the 2nd round) of the 2002 NBA draft; however, he missed his entire rookie season with a knee injury, and was waived by the team the following preseason. Clancy ended up never playing a game in the NBA and is 1 of 9 players selected in the 2002 NBA Draft that never played a game in the league.

He has since played in the Continental Basketball Association (CBA) with the Idaho Stampede and in Europe. Clancy was named the CBA's 2004–05 season's Most Valuable Player, Defensive Player of the Year and All-Star Game MVP. He also earned nominations to the All-CBA First Team and All-Defensive Team.

In July 2005, Clancy was drafted with the first pick by the Mankato Mallards of the All-American Professional Basketball League, but he never played a game with the team because the league folded later that year. In October 2005, Clancy was signed to a one-year contract by the Portland Trail Blazers, but he was waived before ever playing a game for them. He also played with the Fayetteville Patriots in the NBA D-League and the Yakima Sun Kings in the CBA.

Clancy has also played overseas for Iraklis Thessaloniki, Cocodrilos de Caracas of the Venezuelan LBP, Incheon ET Land Black Slamer of the Korean Basketball League, the Russian Super League teams UNICS Kazan, Ural Great Perm and CSK VVS Samara, the Spanish ACB League team Grupo Capitol Valladolid, and the French League team Le Mans Sarthe Basket.

In November 2009, Clancy signed with Bnei HaSharon from the Israeli League. In the summer of 2010 he joined Hapoel Jerusalem

In November 2011, Sam signed with Atenas de Cordoba from the Argentinian League. After that he become a regular player of the Liga Nacional de Basquet of Argentina and was elected the best foreign player for the 2014–2015 season.

== Coaching career ==
On October 24, 2023, Clancy was hired as an assistant coach by the Cleveland Charge of the NBA G League. Sam Clancy was no longer a coach with the Cleveland Charge as of July 2025.
