= Desmon Farmer =

American basketball player

Personal information
- Born: October 7, 1981 (age 45) Flint, Michigan, U.S.
- Listed height: 6 ft 5 in (1.96 m)
- Listed weight: 220 lb (100 kg)

Career information
- High school: Northwestern (Flint, Michigan)
- College: USC (2000–2004)
- NBA draft: 2004: undrafted
- Playing career: 2004–2015
- Position: Shooting guard
- Number: 33

Career history
- 2004: Aris Thessaloniki
- 2005: Telindus Oostende
- 2005: Prokom Trefl
- 2005–2006: Tulsa 66ers
- 2006: CAI Zaragoza
- 2006–2007: Seattle SuperSonics
- 2007: Tulsa 66ers
- 2007–2008: Rio Grande Valley Vipers
- 2008: Atléticos de San Germán
- 2008: San Antonio Spurs
- 2008–2009: Spartak Primorje
- 2009: Zadar
- 2009–2010: Reno Bighorns
- 2010–2011: Ironi Ashkelon
- 2011: Metros de Santiago
- 2012: Boca Juniors
- 2013: Reno Bighorns
- 2014: Cóndores de Cundinamarca
- 2015: Sigal Prishtina
- 2015: Guaiqueríes de Margarita

Career highlights
- First-team All-Pac-10 (2004)
- Stats at NBA.com
- Stats at Basketball Reference

Desmon Kenyatta Farmer (born October 7, 1981) is an American former professional basketball player. He played briefly in the National Basketball Association (NBA), for the Seattle SuperSonics and the San Antonio Spurs.

== College career ==
Farmer attended and played collegiately for the University of Southern California (USC); he averaged 19 points per game and nearly five rebounds in his final two years combined, graduating in 2004.

== Professional career ==
After being signed and eventually cut before the season started by the NBA's Indiana Pacers in 2004, Farmer played professionally in Greece, Belgium and Poland before returning to the U.S. to play for the NBA Development League's Tulsa 66ers in 2005–06, averaging 16.4 points per game. Farmer was signed to a contract by the Seattle SuperSonics in October 2006, being waived on January 4, 2007, appearing in eight games during the season.

After two seasons, with the 66ers and Rio Grande Valley Vipers—also from the D-League—and a couple of months in Puerto Rico, with Atléticos de San Germán, Farmer was signed by the San Antonio Spurs on September 18, 2008. After playing sparingly, he was waived on November 16, in order to make roster space available for another guard, Blake Ahearn; he signed with the Reno Bighorns in November 2009, after a brief passage in Croatia with KK Zadar.

On October 1, 2010, Farmer signed with Ironi Ashkelon.

On January 31, 2013, he rejoined the Reno Bighorns.

On January 2, 2015, he signed with Sigal Prishtina of Kosovo.
