= Washington Huskies men's basketball statistical leaders =

The Washington Huskies men's basketball statistical leaders are individual statistical leaders of the Washington Huskies men's basketball program in various categories, including points, assists, blocks, rebounds, and steals. Within those areas, the lists identify single-game, single-season, and career leaders. As of the next college basketball season in 2024–25, the Huskies represent the University of Washington in the NCAA Division I Big Ten Conference.

Washington began competing in intercollegiate basketball in 1895. However, the school's record book does not generally list records from before the 1950s, as records from before this period are often incomplete and inconsistent. Since scoring was much lower in this era, and teams played much fewer games during a typical season, it is likely that few or no players from this era would appear on these lists anyway.

The NCAA did not officially record assists as a stat until the 1983–84 season, and blocks and steals until the 1985–86 season, but Washington's record books includes players in these stats before these seasons. These lists are updated through the end of the 2020–21 season.

== Scoring ==
Career
Rk	Player	Points	Seasons
1	Chris Welp	2073	1983–84 1984–85 1985–86 1986–87
2	C.J. Wilcox	1880	2010–11 2011–12 2012–13 2013–14
3	Andrew Andrews	1812	2012–13 2013–14 2014–15 2015–16
4	Jon Brockman	1805	2005–06 2006–07 2007–08 2008–09
5	Quincy Pondexter	1786	2006–07 2007–08 2008–09 2009–10
6	Bob Houbregs	1774	1950–51 1951–52 1952–53
7	Todd MacCulloch	1743	1995–96 1996–97 1997–98 1998–99
8	Isaiah Thomas	1721	2008–09 2009–10 2010–11
9	Eldridge Recasner	1700	1986–87 1987–88 1988–89 1989–90
10	Noah Dickerson	1609	2015–16 2016–17 2017–18 2018–19

Season
Rk	Player	Points	Season
1	Bob Houbregs	846	1952–53
2	Chris Welp	729	1986–87
3	Andrew Andrews	712	2015–16
4	Quincy Pondexter	695	2009–10
	Terrell Brown Jr.	695	2021–22
6	Keion Brooks Jr.	674	2023–24
7	Louie Nelson	668	1972–73
8	Brandon Roy	666	2005–06
9	Chris Welp	601	1985–86
10	Isaiah Thomas	593	2009–10

Single game
Rk	Player	Points	Season	Opponent
1	Bob Houbregs	49	1952–53	Idaho
2	Andrew Andrews	47	2015–16	Washington St.
3	Bob Houbregs	45	1952–53	Seattle University
4	Bob Houbregs	42	1952–53	Louisiana State
5	George Irvine	41	1969–70	USC

== Rebounds ==
Career
Rk	Player	Rebounds	Seasons
1	Jon Brockman	1283	2005–06 2006–07 2007–08 2008–09
2	Doug Smart	1051	1956–57 1957–58 1958–59
3	Doug McClary	997	1950–51 1951–52 1952–53
4	Chris Welp	995	1983–84 1984–85 1985–86 1986–87
5	Noah Dickerson	979	2015–16 2016–17 2017–18 2018–19
6	Todd MacCulloch	975	1995–96 1996–97 1997–98 1998–99
7	Bob Houbregs	971	1950–51 1951–52 1952–53
8	Steve Hawes	945	1969–70 1970–71 1971–72
9	Dean Parsons	876	1951–52 1952–53 1953–54 1954–55
10	Bruno Boin	832	1955–56 1956–57 1958–59

Season
Rk	Player	Rebounds	Season
1	Jon Brockman	391	2008–09
2	Steve Hawes	386	1970–71
3	Bob Houbregs	381	1952–53
4	Doug Smart	373	1958–59
5	Jon Brockman	370	2007–08
6	Steve Hawes	365	1971–72
7	Hannes Steinbach	353	2025–26
8	Doug Smart	349	1957–58
9	Doug McClary	346	1952–53
	Dean Parsons	346	1954–55

Single game
Rk	Player	Rebounds	Season	Opponent
1	Ed Corell	30	1961–62	Oregon
2	Steve Hawes	28	1971–72	Stanford
3	Dean Parsons	26	1954–55	Idaho
4	Hannes Steinbach	24	2025–26	USC
5	Steve Hawes	23	1969–70	Washington St.
6	Noah Dickerson	22	2017–18	E. Washington
	Bob Houbregs	22	1952–53	Utah
	Jim Coshow	22	1955–56	Iowa
	Steve Hawes	22	1971–72	Stanford

== Assists ==
Career
Rk	Player	Assists	Seasons
1	Will Conroy	515	2001–02 2002–03 2003–04 2004–05
2	Abdul Gaddy	469	2009–10 2010–11 2011–12 2012–13
3	Chester Dorsey	466	1973–74 1974–75 1975–76 1976–77
4	Isaiah Thomas	415	2008–09 2009–10 2010–11
5	Justin Dentmon	401	2005–06 2006–07 2007–08 2008–09
6	Venoy Overton	390	2007–08 2008–09 2009–10 2010–11
7	Andrew Andrews	388	2012–13 2013–14 2014–15 2015–16
8	Eldridge Recasner	376	1986–87 1987–88 1988–89 1989–90
9	David Crisp	355	2015–16 2016–17 2017–18 2018–19
10	Kim Stewart	343	1974–75 1975–76 1976–77 1977–78

Season
Rk	Player	Assists	Season
1	Will Conroy	219	2004–05
2	Isaiah Thomas	213	2010–11
3	Sahvir Wheeler	188	2023–24
4	Abdul Gaddy	182	2011–12
5	Nigel Williams-Goss	177	2014–15
6	Andrew Andrews	166	2015–16
7	Chester Dorsey	163	1975–76
8	Nate Robinson	159	2004–05
9	Abdul Gaddy	157	2012–13
10	Markelle Fultz	148	2016–17

Single game
Rk	Player	Assists	Season	Opponent
1	Rafael Stone	16	1969–70	California
2	Chester Dorsey	15	1974–75	UCLA
	Curtis Allen	15	2001–02	Arizona State
4	Will Conroy	14	2004–05	California
	Sahvir Wheeler	14	2023–24	Seattle
6	Chester Dorsey	13	1973–74	UCLA
	Will Conroy	13	2004–05	Loyola Marymount
	Will Conroy	13	2004–05	Sacred Heart
	Isaiah Thomas	13	2010–11	California
	Paul Mulcahy	13	2023–24	San Diego State

== Steals ==
Career
Rk	Player	Steals	Seasons
1	Matisse Thybulle	331	2015–16 2016–17 2017–18 2018–19
2	Jamie Booker	195	1993–94 1994–95 1995–96 1996–97
3	Justin Dentmon	180	2005–06 2006–07 2007–08 2008–09
4	Venoy Overton	177	2007–08 2008–09 2009–10 2010–11
5	Bryant Boston	164	1991–92 1992–93 1994–95 1995–96
6	Jamal Bey	153	2018–19 2019–20 2020–21 2021–22 2022–23
7	Andrew Andrews	149	2012–13 2013–14 2014–15 2015–16
8	Nate Robinson	140	2002–03 2003–04 2004–05
9	Bobby Jones	134	2002–03 2003–04 2004–05 2005–06
10	Dion Brown	127	1988–89 1989–90 1990–91

Season
Rk	Player	Steals	Season
1	Matisse Thybulle	126	2018–19
2	Matisse Thybulle	101	2017–18
3	Terrell Brown Jr.	69	2021–22
4	Bryant Boston	67	1994–95
5	Tony Wroten	66	2011–12
6	Matisse Thybulle	65	2016–17
7	Dejounte Murray	62	2015–16
8	Nate Robinson	61	2004–05
9	Jamie Booker	60	1996–97
	Great Osobor	60	2024–25

Single game
Rk	Player	Steals	Season	Opponent
1	Jason Hamilton	9	1995–96	E. Washington
2	Mike Hayward	7	1990–91	Arizona
	Brent Merritt	7	1990–91	USC
	Jamie Booker	7	1994–95	Arizona
	Jamie Booker	7	1996–97	Arizona State
	Joel Smith	7	2004–05	Sacred Heart
	Tony Wroten	7	2011–12	Colorado
	Matisse Thybulle	7	2017–18	Bethune Cookman
	Matisse Thybulle	7	2018–19	Sacramento State
	Matisse Thybulle	7	2018–19	USC
	Matisse Thybulle	7	2018–19	UCLA
	Great Osobor	7	2024–25	Seattle Pacific

== Blocks ==
Career
Rk	Player	Blocks	Seasons
1	Chris Welp	186	1983–84 1984–85 1985–86 1986–87
	Matisse Thybulle	186	2015–16 2016–17 2017–18 2018–19
3	Matthew Bryan-Amaning	158	2007–08 2008–09 2009–10 2010–11
4	Todd MacCulloch	142	1995–96 1996–97 1997–98 1998–99
5	Malik Dime	137	2015–16 2016–17
6	Hameir Wright	135	2017–18 2018–19 2019–20 2020–21
7	Franck Kepnang	115	2022–23 2023–24 2024–25 2025–26
8	Aziz N’Diaye	113	2010–11 2011–12 2012–13
9	David Dixon	98	1999–00 2000–01 2001–02
	C.J. Wilcox	98	2010–11 2011–12 2012–13 2013–14

Season
Rk	Player	Blocks	Season
1	Malik Dime	88	2015–16
2	Robert Upshaw	85	2014–15
3	Matisse Thybulle	83	2018–19
4	Chris Welp	67	1985–86
	David Dixon	67	2001–02
6	Isaiah Stewart	66	2019–20
7	Chris Welp	63	1986–87
8	Franck Kepnang	56	2025–26
9	Spencer Hawes	54	2006–07
	Matthew Bryan-Amaning	54	2009–10
	Matthew Bryan-Amaning	54	2010–11

Single game
Rk	Player	Blocks	Season	Opponent
1	Robert Upshaw	8	2014–15	San Jose State
2	David Dixon	7	2001–02	Santa Clara
	David Dixon	7	2001–02	Washington State
	Matthew Bryan-Amaning	7	2010–11	Arizona
	Malik Dime	7	2015–16	Colorado
6	Chris Welp	6	1985–86	Washington State
	Chris Welp	6	1985–86	Stanford
	David Dixon	6	2001–02	Arizona State
	Hakeem Rollins	6	2003–04	California
	Spencer Hawes	6	2006–07	Sacramento State
	Malik Dime	6	2016–17	Yale
	Matisse Thybulle	6	2016–17	Yale
	Malik Dime	6	2016–17	USC
	Matisse Thybulle	6	2018–19	W. Kentucky
	Braxton Meah	6	2022–23	Cal Poly
	Franck Kepnang	6	2025–26	Southern
	Franck Kepnang	6	2025–26	Utah
	Franck Kepnang	6	2025–26	Northwestern
