= Ryan High School =

Ryan High School may refer to:

- Archbishop Ryan High School, in Philadelphia, Pennsylvania
- Billy Ryan High School, in Denton, Texas
- Father Ryan High School, in Nashville, Tennessee
- Bishop Ryan High School, in Minot, North Dakota
