= 1971–72 Washington State Cougars men's basketball team =

American college basketball season

1971–72 Washington State Cougars men's basketball
- Conference: Pacific-8
- Record: 11–15 (3–11 Pac-8)
- Head coach: Bob Greenwood (1st season)
- Assistant coaches: Dale Brown; Homer Drew
- Home arena: Bohler Gymnasium

1971–72 Pacific-8 Conference men's basketball standings
	Conf.				Overall
Team	W		L	PCT	W		L	PCT
No. 1 UCLA	14	–	0	1.000	30	–	0	1.000
Washington	10	–	4	.714	20	–	6	.769
Oregon State	9	–	5	.643	18	–	10	.643
USC	9	–	5	.643	16	–	10	.615
California	6	–	8	.429	13	–	16	.448
Stanford	5	–	9	.357	10	–	15	.400
Washington State	3	–	11	.214	11	–	15	.423
Oregon	0	–	14	.000	6	–	20	.231
As of April 15, 1972; Rankings from AP Poll

The 1971–72 Washington State Cougars men's basketball team represented Washington State University for the 1971–72 NCAA college basketball season. Led by first-year head coach Bob Greenwood, the Cougars were members of the Pacific-8 Conference and played their home games on campus at Bohler Gymnasium in Pullman, Washington.

The Cougars were 11–15 overall in the regular season and 3–11 in conference play, seventh in the standings.

Hired in July to succeed Marv Harshman, Greenwood was an assistant at Iowa for a year and before that the head coach at Washington University in St. Louis; he resigned from WSU in mid-March, after just one season. Assistant coach Dale Brown became the head coach at LSU a week later, and freshman coach Homer Drew went with him to Baton Rouge.

George Raveling, an assistant at Maryland under Lefty Driesell, was hired by WSU athletic director Ray Nagel a few weeks later in April, and led the Cougar program for eleven years.
