= Dale Brown (basketball) =

American college basketball coach (1935–2026)

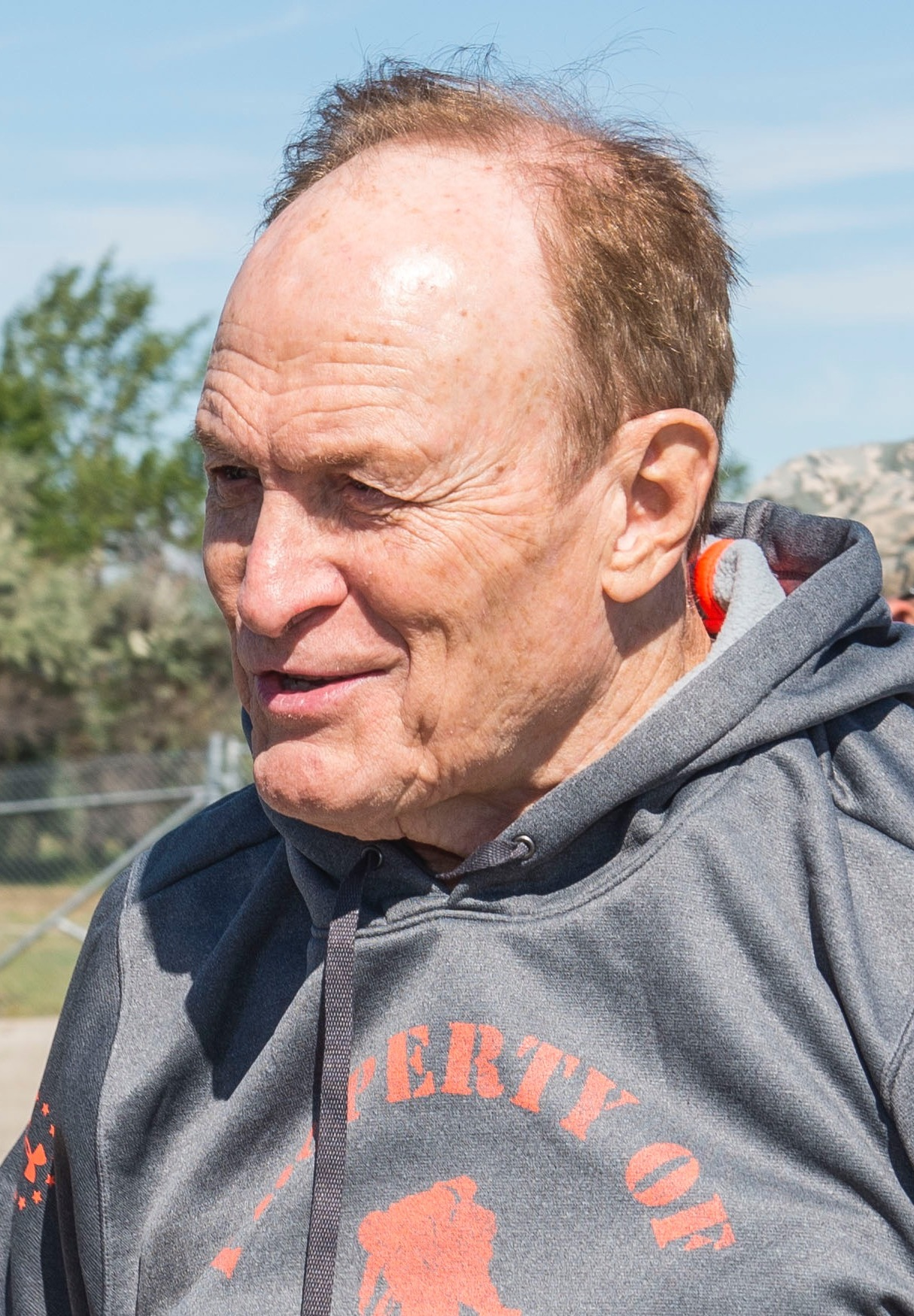
- Brown in 2015

Biographical details
- Born: October 31, 1935; Minot, North Dakota, U.S.
- Died: October 23, 2026 (aged 90)

Playing career
- 1953–1957: Minot State

Coaching career (HC unless noted)
- 1957–1959: Columbus HS
- 1959–1964: Bishop Ryan HS
- 1964–1965: Garfield Jr. HS
- 1965–1966: Palm Springs HS
- 1966–1971: Utah State (assistant)
- 1971–1972: Washington State (assistant)
- 1972–1997: LSU

Head coaching record
- Overall: 448–301 (.598)
- Tournaments: 18–13 (NCAA Division I); 0–2 (NIT)

Accomplishments and honors

Championships
- 2 NCAA Division I tournament Final Four (1981, 1986); 4 SEC regular season (1979, 1981, 1985, 1991); SEC tournament (1980)

Awards
- Sporting News Coach of the Year Award (1981); 4× SEC Coach of the Year (1973, 1979, 1981, 1989)
- College Basketball Hall of Fame; Inducted in 2014

Dale Duward Brown (October 31, 1935 – October 23, 2026) was an American college basketball coach. He was the head coach of the LSU Tigers for 25 years, and his teams earned Final Four appearances in 1981 and 1986. Brown is also remembered as one of the most vocal critics of the NCAA, saying it "legislated against human dignity and practiced monumental hypocrisy".

== Early life ==
Brown was born in Minot, North Dakota, on October 31, 1935, and raised there. His family was of limited means; he and his two older sisters were reared by his single mother Agnes, a domestic service worker with an eighth-grade education, and all worked various jobs. He graduated from St. Leo's High School in 1953, where he starred in football, basketball, and track. During his senior year, he posted the highest scoring average in state basketball history and also set a school record in the quarter mile.

Brown then went to Minot State Teacher's College (now known as Minot State University), where he was a star athlete, earning 12 varsity letters in football, basketball, and track; the only athlete to accomplish this in these three sports. He scored 1,140 points in three years of varsity basketball.

In 1999, Sports Illustrated selected him as one of the top 50 athletes of the 20th century from North Dakota. Brown graduated from Minot State in 1957 and received a master's degree at the University of Oregon in 1964. He was inducted into the Minot State University Athletics Hall of Fame in 1981.

== Coaching career ==
=== North Dakota (1957–1964) ===
From 1957 to 1959, Brown was head coach of the basketball, wrestling, and track teams at Columbus High School in Columbus, North Dakota. In 1959, he became the head basketball coach at Bishop Ryan High School in Minot, where he stayed until 1964.

In 1961, Brown was recalled to military service for one year due to the Berlin Crisis. While there, he served as head coach of the basketball and track teams in Fort Riley, Kansas; which both won championships. He received an honorable discharge from the U.S. Army as a sergeant.

Brown is a member of the North Dakota Sports Hall of Fame, National Collegiate Basketball Hall of Fame, and Minot State University Sports Hall of Fame.

=== After North Dakota (1964–1972) ===
Brown left North Dakota in 1964 for various coaching jobs around the country:

- 1964–1965: Garfield Junior High School basketball coach, Berkeley, California
- 1965–1966: Palm Springs High School head basketball coach, Palm Springs, California
- 1966–1971: Assistant basketball coach, Utah State University
- 1971–1972: Assistant basketball coach, Washington State University

=== LSU: early years (1972–1978) ===
Brown came to LSU in the spring of 1972, replacing Press Maravich as head coach. The LSU program had received great notoriety under Press Maravich because of his All-American son, Pete. In spite of the publicity, however, LSU finished 10 games under .500 during Maravich's tenure (including a 10-16 record in his final season), with only two winning seasons, no NCAA tournaments, and only one NIT appearance in six years. Brown took over a program which had not been to the NCAA tournament since 1954, and had only four winning seasons in the 18 years since then.

He had a winning record in his first season at LSU and he was voted as SEC Coach of the Year. The Tigers finished 14–10, with a 9–9 record in the Southeastern Conference. In his first home game, the Tigers beat #11 Memphis State 94–81, who went on to become NCAA runner-up. The Tigers were picked to finish last in the SEC, but were a surprising fifth.

The Tigers regressed during his next three years at LSU, with losing records in each season. LSU stuck with Brown, who was quickly developing a reputation for his tireless efforts to promote college basketball in the football-hungry state of Louisiana.

Former Nicholls State University head basketball coach Don Landry, a colleague of Brown in Louisiana, fondly remembered Brown's early years in a 2005 newspaper article:

As soon as he was hired he started traveling the state and giving out nets. Wherever there was a basketball goal, he would stop and introduce himself as the new coach at LSU and hand out nets. I had never heard of such a thing and I really looked forward to meeting him after learning how hard he worked, how aggressive he was and how conscious he was of spreading the word about basketball in this state.

Brown's coaching style emphasized intensity and focus during his tenure at LSU. He was known for his public speaking, and received the nickname "The Master Motivator" among players and fans.

Brown's hard work began paying off in the 1976–1977 season. Led by the emergence of freshman Durand "Rudy" Macklin, the Tigers finished with a 15–12 record that year. In 1977–78, LSU was led again by Macklin, then a first-team all-conference selection. The team finished 18–9, and was 12–6 in the Southeastern Conference, including a thrilling 95–94 overtime victory over eventual national champion Kentucky, which came despite all five LSU starters fouling out of the game.

=== Glory years: 1979–1981 ===
In the 1978–1979 season, Brown's Tigers dramatically improved their record, in spite of losing Rudy Macklin to injury. Led by all-conference first team members DeWayne Scales and Al Green, LSU finished 23–6. The Tigers also finished 14–4 in the SEC, giving LSU its first regular-season conference championship and first NCAA tournament appearance in 25 years. LSU made it to the Sweet 16 of the 1979 NCAA tournament, but lost to Michigan State without star player DeWayne Scales who was suspended for the tournament for violating team rules. The Spartans, led by Magic Johnson, went on to win the National Championship.

Macklin returned to the team for the 1979–1980 season. With Macklin and Scales, LSU had one of the best forward combinations in the country. Macklin was a first-team all-conference selection, and Scales was a second-team selection. In addition, guard Ethan Martin emerged as a second-team selection. The Tigers improved their record again, finishing 26–6. They also finished 14–4 in conference again, finishing second in conference play before going on to win what would be the program's only SEC men's basketball tournament to date. The Tigers also went one round deeper than the previous year in the 1980 NCAA tournament. This year, they lost in the Elite 8 to Louisville. Like Michigan State the year before, Louisville (led by Darrell Griffith) went on to win the National Championship.

The Tigers improved again in the 1980–1981 season. In fact, it would be the winningest year in LSU history. This year, Brown took his team to the Final Four, the second in LSU history, and the first of the Brown era. The team finished 31–5 (most wins in the nation) and won the conference championship with a 17–1 record. The team also set a school record winning 26 straight games, including its first 17 conference games and the only SEC team to ever win 17 consecutive league games in the same season with only a loss to powerhouse Kentucky in Rupp Arena stopping LSU from becoming the only team to complete an 18-game SEC slate with an unblemished mark. Rudy Macklin was an All-American, as well as First Team All SEC. Ethan Martin also made First Team All SEC, and Howard Carter made the Second Team. LSU advanced to the Final Four by beating Wichita State 96–85 in the Elite 8 round of the 1981 NCAA tournament, played in front of home-state fans in the Louisiana Superdome. To reach the regional final, LSU defeated future SEC rival Arkansas, coached at the time by Eddie Sutton, who would tangle with Brown for four seasons at Kentucky.

Unfortunately for Brown and the Tigers, Macklin was injured in the Wichita State game and was not 100 percent for the Final Four. The Tigers lost in the national semifinal game to Indiana. In addition, for the third year in a row, LSU was eliminated by the eventual national champion, as Indiana (led by Isiah Thomas) won it all. Brown was named national coach of the year by The Sporting News for his team's performance.

=== Disappointment and investigation: 1982–1985 ===
Like many other teams that reach the Final Four with a senior superstar, Brown's Tigers experienced a decline in the next two years. LSU still had star players in Howard Carter and Leonard Mitchell, but the team would not make the NCAA tournament in 1982 and 1983. The Tigers finished 14–14 and 19–13 in those years, and were invited to the NIT in both seasons but lost in the first round.

The team got back on track in the next two seasons, but these years proved to be even more frustrating. The next wave of star players had emerged. Among them were Jerry "Ice Man" Reynolds, Derrick Taylor, Nikita Wilson, Don Redden and John Williams (Brown's most celebrated recruit to date). The Tigers had improved regular seasons, finishing 18–11 in 1983–1984 and 19–10 from 1984 to 1985. The 1984–1985 team also won the Southeastern Conference championship with a 13–5 record. However, both seasons ended with tremendous disappointments. In 1984, the Tigers were upset by #10-seed Dayton. 1985 was even more embarrassing for the Tigers. LSU was a #4-seed going into the 1985 NCAA tournament, but were beaten badly by #13-seed Navy (led by a then-unknown David Robinson).

It was also during this time that Brown began having some of his most notorious run-ins with the NCAA. Brown became an outspoken and relentless critic of the NCAA, calling them "hypocrites" and even "The Gestapo". He has consistently argued that the NCAA should be more compassionate when enforcing rules governing compensation for student-athletes, especially in situations involving athletes who were truly in need.

In 1982, the NCAA began a four-year investigation into Brown and the LSU basketball program. The NCAA cited LSU for sixteen rules violations and stripped the Tigers of two scholarships. Brown was not connected to any of the reported infractions.

=== "The master motivator": 1986–1988 ===
The 1985–1986 season was well on its way to being the most disastrous season yet for Brown and his Tigers. However, he rallied the team and turned the season into what is fondly known to many LSU fans as the greatest season in the school's basketball history. The Tigers overcame several obstacles to reach their third-ever Final Four, the second under Brown.

Before the season began, Jerry "Ice" Reynolds went pro early. Incoming freshman Tito Horford was kicked off the team two months into the season. Starting center Zoran Jovanovich injured his knee in December. Nikita Wilson was academically ineligible after the fall semester. Brown was forced late in the season to move shooting guard Ricky Blanton to starting center. In addition to all these troubles, some LSU players contracted chicken pox during the Southeastern Conference regular season, including star player John Williams. In spite of all these troubles, LSU jumped out to a 14–0 start, and finished with a 22–11 record.

LSU made it into the 1986 NCAA tournament as an 11-seed. Some people were critical of the inclusion, arguing that a slumping team with 11 losses did not deserve an at-large bid. But thanks in part to an unusual, confusing defense Brown devised, which he called the "Freak Defense", the Tigers overcame their lack of talent and depth to make an unlikely run. Also to LSU's advantage was that their 1st and 2nd-round games were played on their home floor (a practice that the NCAA no longer allows due to the significant advantage it can give). After a double-overtime upset victory over #6 seed Purdue, LSU had to beat the top three seeds in its region to reach the Final Four. The Tigers did just that, defeating #3 seed Memphis State in the second round (on a last-second shot by Anthony Wilson), #2 seed Georgia Tech in the Sweet 16, and top seed Kentucky (which had already beaten LSU three times that year) in the Elite 8. The Tigers, however, lost to #2 seed Louisville in the National Semifinals and finished with a 26–12 record. Louisville went on to win the National Championship. LSU's 1986 team is remembered as the first 11-seed to reach the Final Four, and the only team to beat the top three seeds to get there.

The 1986–1987 season was almost a carbon copy of the previous season, except that Brown finished just seconds away from taking LSU to another Final Four. The Tigers lost Don Redden and Derrick Taylor to graduation, Williams went pro, and Blanton was lost for the season with knee surgery. The Tigers were forced to rely on role players and overachievers. The team lost 14 games during the season, but reached the 1987 NCAA tournament as a #10 seed. LSU won the first game of the tournament in an upset over #7 seed Georgia Tech. Next, LSU beat #3 seed Temple and #2 seed DePaul. That set up a showdown with top-seed Indiana in the Elite 8. LSU was in control for most of the game, and had a 9-point lead with five minutes remaining, but Indiana mounted a furious comeback, and defeated LSU 77–76 in the last six seconds. The Hoosiers won the National Championship; it was the fifth time in nine years that Brown's Tigers were eliminated by the eventual national champion.

The 1987 season saw LSU give Kentucky its worst defeat ever in Rupp Arena, 76–41. From 1978 to 1992, the Tigers had great success against the Wildcats, defeating them 17 times in this 15-year span.

LSU struggled again during the 1987–1988 regular season. The Tigers entered the 1988 NCAA tournament with a 16–13 record, barely making the field again, this time as a #9-seed. By now, many LSU fans were not concerned about the poor regular season, as they now just figured that Brown would easily engineer another Cinderella run. But the Tigers lost to Georgetown in the first round 66–63 on a last-second shot. In spite of the disappointment in 1988, Brown had already established his reputation as the "Master Motivator"; he was now considered a coach who could get the best out of his less-talented teams through inspiration, sheer will, and the "Freak Defense".

=== Superstar era: 1989–1993 ===
Brown reached the Final Four with a veteran team in 1981. He then made it again with a team of mostly overachievers in 1986. Now, he had the opportunity to work with the superstars. Unfortunately for Brown, these years arguably proved to be the most disappointing of his LSU career. It was during these years that the "Master Motivator" label backfired on him. By the end of the 1992 season, Brown was known as a coach who could get the most out of his least talented teams, but did not get the best results with NBA caliber talent.

Chris Jackson, Stanley Roberts and Vernel Singleton came to LSU from 1988 to 1989 (Roberts was not eligible to play that season.) Shaquille O'Neal and Maurice Williamson (son of former NBA and ABA star John Williamson) came from 1989 to 1990. Jamie Brandon committed to LSU from 1991 to 1992. Future NBA first-round choice Geert Hammink was Shaq's backup at center before becoming an all-conference player in 1993. Of these recruits, Jackson, Roberts, O'Neal and Brandon were McDonald's All Americans. Jackson, a sophomore, and freshmen Roberts and O'Neal only played one year together.

Jackson, who later converted to Islam and changed his name to Mahmoud Abdul-Rauf, was the first of these recruits to become a star. He exploded on the scene to become an All-American in his freshman year. He was the leading scorer in the nation and still holds the record for a freshman, averaging 30.2 points a game. Jackson and fifth-year senior Blanton led LSU to a 20-win season in 1989. The Tigers, however, lost in the first round of the 1989 NCAA tournament to thr UTEP, led by future NBA star Tim Hardaway.

In terms of player talent, the 1989–1990 team was the best Brown ever assembled. The roster included four future first-round NBA picks (Jackson, Roberts, O'Neal and Hammink), and two of them (Jackson and O'Neal) were current or future All-Americans. The team started the season ranked #2, but failed to meet those expectations by the end of the season. Jackson was named All-American for the second year in a row, and the Tigers finished a respectable 23–9. They had some big wins against UNLV 107–105, Texas 124–113, Loyola Marymount 148–141, Kentucky 94–81, and Notre Dame 87–64. However, UNLV went on to win the national championship, and Texas and Loyola Marymount each appeared in the Elite Eight. LSU lost in the second round of the 1990 NCAA tournament to Georgia Tech; 94–91. Tech, led by future NBA players Kenny Anderson, Dennis Scott, Malcolm Mackey and Brian Oliver, went on to the Final Four.

After the season, Jackson went on to the NBA and Roberts left to play pro ball in Europe. Their departures allowed O'Neal to blossom into a superstar. He would be named an All-American in 1991 and 1992, and was the 1991 National Player of the Year. He also helped lead LSU to a Southeastern Conference co-championship in 1991. The 1991 team won 20 games and the 1992 squad won 21 but both seasons ended in disappointment. LSU lost badly to Connecticut with an injured O'Neal in the first round of the 1991 NCAA Tournament. In the 1992 NCAA Tournament, LSU lost in the second round to Indiana. During O'Neal's three years at LSU, the Tigers won 72% of their SEC games, won one SEC conference title and finished second twice.

O'Neal left after the 1991–1992 season, but LSU still won 22 games from 1992 to 1993. The Tigers were now led by Hammink and Brandon. But as had become the custom in recent years, LSU lost early in the 1993 NCAA tournament. This year, the Tigers were eliminated by California and its superstar freshman, Jason Kidd, on a last second shot, 66–64 in the first round. In spite of all the talent and five straight 20-win seasons between 1988 and 1993, Brown failed to get any of these teams to the Sweet 16. In fact, the 1993 NCAA tournament appearance would be the last post-season appearance of the Brown era, and the school's last until 2000.

=== Mediocrity and the Lester Earl incident: 1994–1997 ===
Brown's final four years at LSU were forgettable. All four seasons ended in losing records. Brown was still occasionally bringing talented players into the program, but the team failed to perform and did not work out due to the loss of numerous star players because of injuries, dismissal from the team, or leaving early for the NBA.

From 1993 to 1994 Brown brought in two more McDonald's All Americans: Randy Livingston and Ronnie Henderson. Livingston's LSU career was limited to 29 games. Serious knee injuries kept him from becoming the superstar he was projected to be and he was forced to go pro early before his knee problems worsened. Henderson had a good career but did not play in the NBA. Former Memphis star Sylvester Ford joined the team in 1995, but he injured his knee early and was eventually dismissed from the team.

The beginning of the end for Brown came from 1996 to 1997, when Lester Earl was suspended 11 games into the season. He transferred to the University of Kansas soon afterward. While at Kansas, Earl admitted that an LSU assistant coach gave him money when he was at LSU. The NCAA quickly began an investigation. It found no evidence that Brown or his assistants paid Earl, but it did find that a former booster paid Earl about $5,000 while he was attending LSU. LSU was placed on probation in 1998.

After the incident, many Brown and LSU supporters were angry with the NCAA's decision. They were convinced that the NCAA unfairly came down hard on LSU only because Brown had long been a thorn in its side. They were also angry that Earl received immunity for his testimony regarding receiving money from a booster connected to Brown, never had to repay the money, and would eventually regain the eligibility he lost when he transferred from LSU. In the August 22, 2007 edition of the Baton Rouge Advocate, Earl apologized to Brown, then-assistant head coach Johnny Jones, and LSU in general for his role in the investigation. He claimed that the NCAA pressured him into making false claims against Brown on pain of losing years of NCAA eligibility.

== Retirement from LSU: 1997 ==
After his departure from LSU, Brown kept a low profile in his involvement with LSU athletics. He stayed in Baton Rouge after his retirement and created his own business, Dale Brown Enterprises. Brown also worked as a college basketball analyst and is a motivational speaker and author of several books. He was also the CEO of the Dale Brown Foundation established in 1986 to help those in need. The Foundation was very active after hurricanes devastated Louisiana in 2005.

In 2001, reports surfaced that Brown was considering running for the United States House of Representatives in North Dakota. Republicans in the state tried to persuade Brown to challenge incumbent Democrat Earl Pomeroy, but he decided against it. Two years later his name surfaced again, this time as a potential candidate to run for the United States Senate in 2004 against incumbent Democrat Byron Dorgan. After several trips to Washington, D.C., he decided not to run.

Brown suffered a stroke on April 24, 2003, but made a strong recovery and was back at work a month later.

In 2004, former LSU athletic director and basketball player Joe Dean, who announced many LSU games as a television color commentator during Brown's tenure as a coach submitted a letter to a Baton Rouge newspaper saying that he believed that the basketball floor at the Pete Maravich Assembly Center should be named after Brown. In addition, LSU honored Brown and his 1986 team in February on the 20th anniversary of their improbable run to the Final Four.

Brown served as an adviser to Matthew McConaughey as he played the role of Marshall University football coach Jack Lengyel in the movie We Are Marshall.

In the summer of 2007, Brown appeared on the ABC show Shaq's Big Challenge to offer words of encouragement to Shaquille O'Neal about helping obese children.

== Depictions in media ==
In 2012, Brown was the subject of the documentary Man in the Glass: The Dale Brown Story. In 2015, ESPN produced a documentary of his time spent with Shaquille O'Neal as his star player at LSU with ''Shaq & Dale''.

== Writing ==
Brown authored more than a dozen books, including Getting Over the Four Hurdles of Life (OCLC 760068683), Words to Lift Your Spirits (OCLC 44935155), A Collection of Thoughts on Life (OCLC 879600841), Tiger in a Lion's Den (OCLC 30623688) and The Freak Defense (OCLC 20299185).

== Personal life and death ==
Brown married Vonnie Ness, who taught international folk dancing at Minot State, Utah State and LSU. She was a cheerleader at Minot State and won the Talent and Miss Congeniality awards in the 1958 Miss North Dakota Pageant. They had one daughter and three grandchildren.

He had two older sisters: Lorraine Brown Ahmann (1923–2012) and Eleanor Brown Haider (1924–2015).

Dale Brown died on October 23, 2026, at the age of 90.

== Accolades ==
Coach John Wooden and CBS television analyst Billy Packer both paid Coach Brown tributes for his LSU career.

Wooden said, "Dale did an outstanding job in raising the level of LSU basketball to the status of equality to anyone in the country. Also, if heads of states throughout this troubled world of ours had real concern and consideration for others as Dale Brown, I doubt if our racial, religious, and political problems would be a major issue."

Packer stated that Brown did one of the "greatest coaching jobs in history" in getting his decimated team to the 1986 Final Four.

On January 4, 2022, LSU inaugurated "Dale Brown Court" as the home venue for the Tigers basketball team in the Pete Maravich Assembly Center.

== Head coaching record ==
Record table
Season	Team	Overall	Conference	Standing	Postseason
LSU Tigers (Southeastern Conference) (1972–1997)
1972–73	LSU	14–10	9–9	5th	
1973–74	LSU	12–14	6–12	8th	
1974–75	LSU	10–16	6–12	7th	
1975–76	LSU	12–14	5–13	9th	
1976–77	LSU	15–12	8–10	5th	
1977–78	LSU	18–9	12–6	3rd	
1978–79	LSU	23–6	14–4	1st	NCAA Division I Sweet 16
1979–80	LSU	26–6	14–4	2nd	NCAA Division I Elite Eight
1980–81	LSU	31–5	17–1	1st	NCAA Division I Final Four
1981–82	LSU	14–14	11–7	5th	NIT First Round
1982–83	LSU	19–13	10–8	2nd	NIT First Round
1983–84	LSU	18–11	11–7	3rd	NCAA Division I First Round
1984–85	LSU	19–10	13–5	1st	NCAA Division I First Round
1985–86	LSU	26–12	9–9	5th	NCAA Division I Final Four
1986–87	LSU	24–15	8–10	6th	NCAA Division I Elite Eight
1987–88	LSU	16–14	10–8	4th	NCAA Division I First Round
1988–89	LSU	20–12	11–7	4th	NCAA Division I First Round
1989–90	LSU	23–9	12–6	2nd	NCAA Division I Second Round
1990–91	LSU	20–10	13–5	T-2nd	NCAA Division I First Round
1991–92	LSU	21–10	12–4	2nd (West)	NCAA Division I Second Round
1992–93	LSU	22–11	9–7	2nd (West)	NCAA Division I First Round
1993–94	LSU	11–16	5–11	5th (West)	
1994–95	LSU	12–15	6–10	5th (West)	
1995–96	LSU	12–17	4–12	6th (West)	
1996–97	LSU	10–20	3–13	6th (West)	
LSU:		448–301 (.598)	238–200 (.543)		
Total:		448–301 (.598)			
National champion Postseason invitational champion Conference regular season champion Conference regular season and conference tournament champion Division regular season champion Division regular season and conference tournament champion Conference tournament champion

=== LSU basketball records ===
- Most overall wins: 448
- Most SEC wins: 238 (second to Adolph Rupp)
- Most wins in a season: 31
- Most consecutive wins in a season: 26
- Most consecutive SEC wins in a season: 17
- Most consecutive non-losing seasons: 17 (SEC record shared with Adolph Rupp)
- Most SEC regular season championships: 4 and 4 times runner-up.
- Only SEC Tournament championship: 1980
- Most wins over Kentucky: 18 (of LSU's 27 total, most wins of any coach over Kentucky)
- Most NCAA Tournament appearances: 13 (of LSU's 22 total)
- Most consecutive national tournaments: 15 (of LSU's 25 total, SEC record)
- Most Final Four appearances: 2 (of LSU's 4 total)
- Most Elite Eight Appearances 4 (of LSU's 6 total)
- Highest finish in the polls: 2nd in 1980 and 3rd in 1981
- Most points in a single game: 159 (SEC record)
- Played in front of the largest crowd (54,321) at that time to ever watch a regular season game on January 28, 1989, in the Superdome and defeated second- ranked Georgetown, 82–80.
- In 1990 the Superdome again was the site of a new NCAA regular season paid attendance record of 68,112 when LSU defeated Notre Dame, 87–64
- Coaching Honors:
- 1. On nine occasions selected as SEC Coach of the Year or Runner-up.
- 2.On seven occasions voted Louisiana College Basketball Coach of the Year.
- 3.Two times chosen as National College Basketball Coach of the Year..
- 4.Member of National Collegiate Basketball Hall of Fame, Louisiana Sports Hall of Fame, Louisiana Basketball Coaches Hall of Fame, LSU Sports Hall of Fame, SEC Living Legends, and Louisiana Legends.
- 5. Selected by the Bleacher Report as one of the 50 greatest coaches in college basketball history..
- 6. On September 10, 2021, The LSU Board of Supervisors voted to name the basketball court inside the Pete Maravich Assembly Center the "Dale Brown Court".
