= Mark Slater (American football) =

American football player (born 1955)

No. 58, 61
- Position: Center

Personal information
- Born: February 1, 1955 (age 71); Crosby, North Dakota, U.S.
- Listed height: 6 ft 2 in (1.88 m)
- Listed weight: 257 lb (117 kg)

Career information
- High school: Bishop Ryan Catholic (ND)
- College: Minnesota
- NFL draft: 1978: 12th round, 315th overall pick

Career history
- San Diego Chargers (1978); Philadelphia Eagles (1979–1983)

Awards and highlights
- Second-team All-Big Ten (1977)

Career NFL statistics
- Games played: 82
- Fumble recoveries: 1
- Stats at Pro Football Reference

Mark William Slater (born February 1, 1955) is an American former professional football player who was a center for six seasons with the San Diego Chargers and Philadelphia Eagles of the National Football League (NFL). He played college football for the Minnesota Golden Gophers.
