= Richard Washington =

American basketball player (born 1955)

Personal information
- Born: July 15, 1955 (age 71) Portland, Oregon, U.S.
- Listed height: 6 ft 11 in (2.11 m)
- Listed weight: 220 lb (100 kg)

Career information
- High school: Benson Polytechnic (Portland, Oregon)
- College: UCLA (1973–1976)
- NBA draft: 1976: 1st round, 3rd overall pick
- Drafted by: Kansas City Kings
- Playing career: 1976–1982
- Position: Power forward / center
- Number: 31

Career history
- 1976–1979: Kansas City Kings
- 1979–1980: Milwaukee Bucks
- 1980: Dallas Mavericks
- 1980–1982: Cleveland Cavaliers

Career highlights
- NCAA champion (1975); NCAA Final Four Most Outstanding Player (1975); Consensus first-team All-American (1976); First-team All-Pac-8 (1976); Second-team All-Pac-8 (1975); First-team Parade All-American (1973)

Career NBA statistics
- Points: 3,456 (9.8 ppg)
- Rebounds: 2,204 (6.3 rpg)
- Assists: 409 (1.2 apg)
- Stats at NBA.com
- Stats at Basketball Reference

Richard Lee Washington (born July 15, 1955) is an American former professional basketball player in the National Basketball Association (NBA). He played college basketball for the UCLA Bruins, winning a national championship in 1975, when he was voted the NCAA tournament's Most Outstanding Player. After being named a consensus first-team All-American as a junior in 1976, he was selected by the Kansas City Kings with the third overall pick of the 1976 NBA draft.

== Early life ==
A 6'11" center born in Portland, Oregon, Washington played high school ball at Portland's Benson Tech. An all-around athlete and agile big man, Washington was a three-time all-state and first-team all-tournament selection and led Benson to state championships in 1971 and 1973. Benson was a combined 77–6 those three seasons. Washington was also a hurdler in track and, as a defensive end-receiver, was MVP on the Techmen football team his junior year (the last year he played football).

== College career ==
Washington was highly recruited out of high school and seriously considered the University of Hawaii, but he decided to play college basketball for perennial national champion UCLA and legendary coach John Wooden. He played three seasons at UCLA, with the Bruins going 26–4, 28–3 and 28–4. They won three Pac-8 championships and advanced to three Final Fours.

In Washington's sophomore season of 1974–75, the Bruins captured the NCAA title. The Bruins went 28–3 and, powered by the front line of future NBA players Washington, Dave Meyers and Marques Johnson, defeated Kentucky 92–85 in the title game. It would also be the legendary coach Wooden's final game. Washington was named NCAA basketball tournament Most Outstanding Player following UCLA's 1975 championship.

He earned first-team All-American honors as a junior in 1975–76.

== NBA career ==
Washington was declared eligible for the 1976 NBA draft due to hardship status. He played six seasons in the NBA as a member of the Kansas City Kings, Milwaukee Bucks, Dallas Mavericks and Cleveland Cavaliers. In his NBA career, he scored 3,456 points and grabbed 2,204 rebounds.

== Career statistics ==
=== NBA ===
Legend
GP	Games played	GS	Games started	MPG	Minutes per game
FG%	Field goal percentage	3P%	3-point field goal percentage	FT%	Free throw percentage
RPG	Rebounds per game	APG	Assists per game	SPG	Steals per game
BPG	Blocks per game	PPG	Points per game	**Bold**	Career high

==== Regular season ====
Year	Team	GP	GS	MPG	FG%	3P%	FT%	RPG	APG	SPG	BPG	PPG
1976–77	Kansas City	**82**	–	27.6	.431	–	.697	**8.5**	1.0	0.8	**1.1**	**13.0**
1977–78	Kansas City	78	–	**28.6**	**.477**	–	**.754**	8.4	1.5	**0.9**	0.9	12.8
1978–79	Kansas City	18	–	8.9	.341	–	.625	2.7	0.4	0.4	0.2	2.1
1979–80	Milwaukee	75	–	14.6	.468	.000	.605	3.7	0.7	0.3	0.6	5.9
1980–81	Dallas	11	–	27.9	.436	.000	.739	7.6	1.5	0.5	0.6	10.8
1980–81	Cleveland	69	–	21.8	.459	**.500**	.750	5.3	**1.6**	0.6	0.8	9.9
1981–82	Cleveland	18	**2**	17.4	.435	.000	.600	4.2	0.8	0.4	0.1	6.1
Career		351	2	22.4	.453	.250	.711	6.3	1.2	0.6	0.8	9.8

==== Playoffs ====
Year	Team	GP	GS	MPG	FG%	3P%	FT%	RPG	APG	SPG	BPG	PPG
1978–79	Kansas City	4	–	13.0	**.550**	–	**1.000**	**3.3**	0.0	0.3	0.3	6.0
1979–80	Milwaukee	**7**	–	**16.0**	.532	.000	.250	2.9	**0.4**	**0.6**	**1.1**	**7.3**
Career		11	–	14.9	.537	.000	.500	3.0	0.3	0.5	0.8	6.8

=== College ===
Legend
GP	Games played	GS	Games started	MPG	Minutes per game
FG%	Field goal percentage	3P%	3-point field goal percentage	FT%	Free throw percentage
RPG	Rebounds per game	APG	Assists per game	SPG	Steals per game
BPG	Blocks per game	PPG	Points per game	**Bold**	Career high

Year	Team	GP	GS	MPG	FG%	3P%	FT%	RPG	APG	SPG	BPG	PPG
1973–74	UCLA	24	–	–	.513	–	.500	2.8	0.5	–	–	4.1
1974–75	UCLA	31	–	–	**.576**	–	.724	7.8	2.2	–	–	15.9
1975–76	UCLA	**32**	–	–	.513	–	**.736**	**8.6**	**3.1**	–	–	**20.1**
Career		87	–	–	.536	–	.702	6.7	2.0	–	–	14.2

== Personal life ==
Washington and his wife, Leiko, reside in Milwaukie, Oregon. They have raised two daughters. Interested in building and construction since his youth, in 1993 he founded Richard Washington Construction, a general contracting company.

In 1988, Washington was inducted into the Oregon Sports Hall of Fame.
