= 1971–72 UCLA Bruins men's basketball team =

American college basketball season

1971–72 UCLA Bruins men's basketball

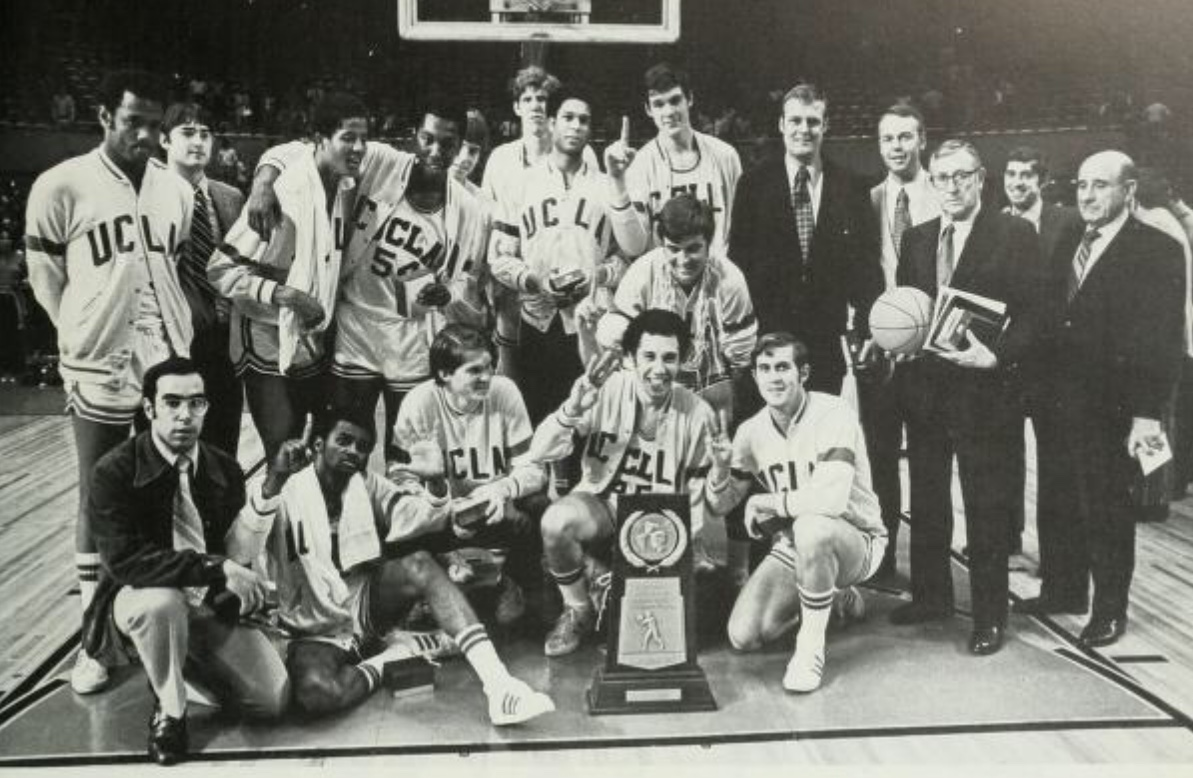

NCAA tournament National champions NCAA regular season champions Pac-8 champions Bruin Classic champions

National Championship Game, W 81–76 vs. Florida State
- Conference: Pacific-8 Conference

Ranking
- Coaches: No. 1
- AP: No. 1
- Record: 30–0 (14–0 Pac-8)
- Head coach: John Wooden (24th season)
- Assistant coach: Gary Cunningham

1971–72 Pacific-8 Conference men's basketball standings
| | Conf. | | | | Overall |
| Team | W | | L | PCT | W | | L | PCT |
|---|---|---|---|---|---|---|---|---|
| No. 1 UCLA | 14 | – | 0 | 1.000 | 30 | – | 0 | 1.000 |
| Washington | 10 | – | 4 | .714 | 20 | – | 6 | .769 |
| Oregon State | 9 | – | 5 | .643 | 18 | – | 10 | .643 |
| USC | 9 | – | 5 | .643 | 16 | – | 10 | .615 |
| California | 6 | – | 8 | .429 | 13 | – | 16 | .448 |
| Stanford | 5 | – | 9 | .357 | 10 | – | 15 | .400 |
| Washington State | 3 | – | 11 | .214 | 11 | – | 15 | .423 |
| Oregon | 0 | – | 14 | .000 | 6 | – | 20 | .231 |
As of April 15, 1972; Rankings from AP Poll

The 1971–72 UCLA Bruins men's basketball team won the National Collegiate Championship on March 25, 1972, in the Los Angeles Sports Arena with an 81–76 victory over Florida State. It was the sixth consecutive championship (and eighth in nine years) under John Wooden, in his 25th year as head coach at UCLA. This was the final year that the national championship game was played on Saturday.

The 1971–72 Bruins had an undefeated record of 30–0, winning by an average margin of over thirty points. They won all 26 games in the regular season (fourteen in Pac-8 play), then four in the NCAA tournament. This was the 45th consecutive victory in a winning streak that reached 88 games, an NCAA record.

== Season summary ==
Sophomore Bill Walton lived up to his advance billing, leading the Bruins to a 30–0 record and the National Championship while averaging a double-double (21.1 PPG, 15.5 RPG). Greg Lee and Henry Bibby formed a solid back court, and forwards Keith Wilkes and Larry Farmer were double-digit scorers. Walton's backup, Swen Nater, could have been a star at other schools and went on to a lengthy pro career.

== Starting lineup ==
| Position | Player | Class |
|---|---|---|
| F | Larry Farmer | Jr. |
| F | Keith Wilkes | So. |
| C | Bill Walton | So. |
| G | Greg Lee | So. |
| G | Henry Bibby | Sr. |

== Roster ==
1971–72 UCLA Bruins men's basketball team
Players
Coaches

| Pos. | # | Name | Height | Weight | Year | Hometown |
|---|---|---|---|---|---|---|
| G | 45 | Henry Bibby (C) | 6 ft 1 in (1.85 m) | 185 lb (84 kg) | Sr | Franklinton, North Carolina |
| F | 30 | Vince Carson | 6 ft 5 in (1.96 m) | — | So |
| F | 34 | Jon Chapman | 6 ft 5 in (1.96 m) | — | Sr |
| G | 22 | Tommy Curtis | 5 ft 11 in (1.8 m) | 170 lb (77 kg) | So | Tampa, Florida |
| F | 54 | Larry Farmer | 6 ft 5 in (1.96 m) | — | Jr |
| G | 25 | Andy Hill | 6 ft 0 in (1.83 m) | — | Sr | Los Angeles, CA |
| F | 53 | Larry Hollyfield | 6 ft 5 in (1.96 m) | 215 lb (98 kg) | Jr |
| G | 43 | Greg Lee | 6 ft 4 in (1.93 m) | 190 lb (86 kg) | So | Reseda, California |
| C | 31 | Swen Nater | 6 ft 11 in (2.11 m) | 240 lb (109 kg) | Jr | Den Helder, Netherlands |
| C | 32 | Bill Walton | 6 ft 11 in (2.11 m) | 210 lb (95 kg) | So | La Mesa, California |
| F | 52 | Keith Wilkes | 6 ft 6 in (1.98 m) | 190 lb (86 kg) | So | Berkeley, California |

Head coach

John Wooden (Purdue)

Assistant coach(es)

Gary Cunningham (UCLA)

Legend

- (C) Team captain
- (S) Suspended
- (I) Ineligible
- (W) Walk-on
- Injured
- Current redshirt

Roster

== Schedule ==
| Date time, TV | Rank^{#} | Opponent^{#} | Result | Record | Site city, state |
Regular Season
| December 3, 1971* | No. 1 | The Citadel | W 105–49 | 1–0 | Pauley Pavilion; Los Angeles, CA |
| December 4, 1971* | No. 1 | Iowa | W 106–72 | 2–0 | Pauley Pavilion; Los Angeles, CA |
| December 10, 1971*; KTLA (delay) | No. 1 | Iowa State | W 110–81 | 3–0 | Pauley Pavilion; Los Angeles, CA |
| December 11, 1971* | No. 1 | Texas A&M | W 117–53 | 4–0 | Pauley Pavilion; Los Angeles, CA |
| December 22, 1971* | No. 1 | Notre Dame | W 114–56 | 5–0 | Pauley Pavilion; Los Angeles, CA |
| December 23, 1971* | No. 1 | TCU | W 119–81 | 6–0 | Pauley Pavilion; Los Angeles, CA |
| December 29, 1971* | No. 1 | Texas | W 115–65 | 7–0 | Pauley Pavilion; Los Angeles, CA |
| December 30, 1971* | No. 1 | No. 6 Ohio State | W 79–53 | 8–0 | Pauley Pavilion; Los Angeles, CA |
| January 7, 1972 | No. 1 | at Oregon State | W 78–72 | 9–0 (1–0) | Gill Coliseum; Corvallis, OR |
| January 1972 | No. 1 | at Oregon | W 93–68 | 10–0 (2–0) | McArthur Court; Eugene, OR |
| January 14, 1972 | No. 1 | Stanford | W 118–79 | 11–0 (3–0) | Pauley Pavilion; Los Angeles, CA |
| January 15, 1972 | No. 1 | California | W 82–43 | 12–0 (4–0) | Pauley Pavilion; Los Angeles, CA |
| January 21, 1972* | No. 1 | Santa Clara | W 92–57 | 13–0 | Pauley Pavilion; Los Angeles, CA |
| January 22, 1972* | No. 1 | Denver | W 108–61 | 14–0 | Pauley Pavilion; Los Angeles, CA |
| January 28, 1972 | No. 1 | at Loyola–Chicago | W 92–64 | 15–0 | Chicago Stadium (11,255); Chicago, IL |
| January 29, 1972* | No. 1 | at Notre Dame | W 57–32 | 16–0 | Athletic & Convocation Center (11,343); Notre Dame, IN |
| February 5, 1972 | No. 1 | USC | W 81–56 | 17–0 (5–0) | Pauley Pavilion; Los Angeles, CA |
| February 11, 1972 | No. 1 | Washington State | W 89–58 | 18–0 (6–0) | Pauley Pavilion; Los Angeles, CA |
| February 12, 1972 | No. 1 | Washington | W 109–70 | 19–0 (7–0) | Pauley Pavilion; Los Angeles, CA |
| February 19, 1972 | No. 1 | at Washington | W 100–83 | 20–0 (8–0) | Hec Edmundson Pavilion; Seattle, WA |
| February 21, 1972 | No. 1 | at Washington State | W 85–55 | 21–0 (9–0) | Bohler Gymnasium; Pullman, WA |
| February 25, 1972 | No. 1 | Oregon | W 92–70 | 22–0 (10–0) | Pauley Pavilion; Los Angeles, CA |
| February 26, 1972 | No. 1 | Oregon State | W 91–72 | 23–0 (11–0) | Pauley Pavilion; Los Angeles, CA |
| March 3, 1972 | No. 1 | at California | W 85–71 | 24–0 (12–0) | Harmon Gym; Berkeley, CA |
| March 4, 1972 | No. 1 | at Stanford | W 102–73 | 25–0 (13–0) | Maples Pavilion; Stanford, CA |
| March 10, 1972 | No. 1 | at USC | W 79–66 | 26–0 (14–0) | Los Angeles Memorial Sports Arena; Los Angeles, CA |
NCAA Tournament
| March 16, 1972*; 6:00 pm | No. 1 | vs. Weber State; Regional semifinal | W 90–58 | 27–0 | Marriott Center; Provo, UT |
| March 18, 1972*; 3:00 pm | No. 1 | vs. No. 5 Long Beach State; Regional Final | W 73–57 | 28–0 | Marriott Center; Provo, UT |
| March 23, 1972*; 8:00 pm | No. 1 | vs. No. 4 Louisville; National semifinal | W 96–77 | 29–0 | Los Angeles Memorial Sports Arena; Los Angeles, CA |
| March 25, 1972*; 2:00 pm | No. 1 | vs. No. 10 Florida State; National Final | W 81–76 | 30–0 | Los Angeles Memorial Sports Arena; Los Angeles, CA |
*Non-conference game. ^{#}Rankings from AP Poll. (#) Tournament seedings in parentheses. All times are in Pacific Time.

== Notes ==
- The team opened the season as the No. 1 team in both the AP and UPI polls
- Prior to joining the varsity team, Lee (17.9 ppg), Wilkes (20.0 ppg), and Walton (18.1, 68.6 per cent) were members of the 20–0 Frosh team
- Bruins won the Bruin Classic in Pauley Pavilion
- Bill Walton and Henry Bibby were named to the 1972 Consensus All-America first team

== Awards and honors ==
- Bill Walton, USBWA College Player of the Year
- Bill Walton, Naismith College Player of the Year
- Bill Walton, Adolph Rupp Trophy

== Team players drafted into the NBA ==
- Henry Bibby, New York
- Bill Walton, San Antonio (ABA)
