= 1973–74 UCLA Bruins men's basketball team =

American college basketball season

1973–74 UCLA Bruins men's basketball

Pac-8 champions Bruin Classic champions

NCAA tournament, Final Four
- Conference: Pacific-8 Conference

Ranking
- Coaches: No. 2
- AP: No. 2
- Record: 26–4 (12–2 Pac-8)
- Head coach: John Wooden (26th season)
- Assistant coaches: Gary Cunningham; Frank Arnold
- Home arena: Pauley Pavilion

1973–74 Pacific-8 Conference men's basketball standings
	Conf.				Overall
Team	W		L	PCT	W		L	PCT
No. 2 UCLA	12	–	2	.857	26	–	4	.867
USC	11	–	3	.786	24	–	5	.828
Oregon	9	–	5	.643	15	–	11	.577
Washington	7	–	7	.500	16	–	10	.615
Oregon State	6	–	8	.429	13	–	13	.500
Stanford	5	–	9	.357	11	–	14	.440
California	3	–	11	.214	9	–	17	.346
Washington State	3	–	11	.214	8	–	21	.276
Rankings from AP Poll

The 1973–74 UCLA Bruins men's basketball team was Bill Walton's final year with the school. During the season, the Bruins' 88 game winning streak ended in a 71–70 defeat by the University of Notre Dame Fighting Irish. Coincidentally, the Bruins' final defeat in 1971 prior to the winning streak was also to Notre Dame, by a score of 89–82.

In the postseason, UCLA's record streak of seven consecutive national titles was broken. Eventual national champion North Carolina State defeated the Bruins 80–77 in double overtime in the Final Four.

== Pre-season ==
The team was ranked as the No. 1 team in the nation by both AP and UPI polls.

== Roster ==
1973–74 UCLA Bruins men's basketball team
Players
Coaches

Pos.	#	Name	Height	Weight	Year	Hometown
G	22	Tommy Curtis	5 ft 11 in (1.8 m)	170 lb (77 kg)	Sr	Tallahassee, Florida
C	35	Ralph Drollinger	7 ft 1 in (2.16 m)	210 lb (95 kg)	So	La Mesa, California
F	50	Gary Franklin	6 ft 5 in (1.96 m)	187 lb (85 kg)	Sr	Reseda, California
F	54	Marques Johnson	6 ft 5 in (1.96 m)	212 lb (96 kg)	Fr	Los Angeles, California
G	43	Greg Lee	6 ft 4 in (1.93 m)	190 lb (86 kg)	Sr	Raseda, California
G	45	Andre McCarter	6 ft 2 in (1.88 m)	174 lb (79 kg)	So	Philadelphia, Pennsylvania
F	34	Dave Meyers	6 ft 7 in (2.01 m)	205 lb (93 kg)	Jr	La Habra, California
G/F	55	Gavin Smith	6 ft 4 in (1.93 m)	185 lb (84 kg)	Fr	Sherman Oaks, California
G	44	Jim Spillane	5 ft 10 in (1.78 m)	150 lb (68 kg)	Fr	Palos Verdes Estates, California
G/F	25	Pete Trgovich	6 ft 5 in (1.96 m)	175 lb (79 kg)	Jr	East Chicago, Indiana
C	32	Bill Walton (C)	6 ft 11 in (2.11 m)	220 lb (100 kg)	Sr	La Mesa, California
F/C	31	Richard Washington	6 ft 9 in (2.06 m)	220 lb (100 kg)	Fr	Portland, Oregon
G	42	Bob Webb	6 ft 1 in (1.85 m)	160 lb (73 kg)	Sr	Trevose, Pennsylvania
F	52	Keith Wilkes (C)	6 ft 6 in (1.98 m)	190 lb (86 kg)	Sr	Berkeley, California

Head coach

John Wooden (Purdue)

Assistant coach(es)

Gary Cunningham (UCLA)
Frank Arnold (Idaho State)

Legend

- (C) Team captain
- (S) Suspended
- (I) Ineligible
- (W) Walk-on
- Injured
- Current redshirt

Roster

== Schedule ==
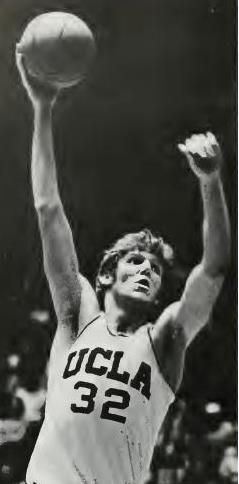
Bill Walton taking a shot.

Date time, TV	Rank^{#}	Opponent^{#}	Result	Record	Site city, state
Regular Season
November 30, 1973*	No. 1	Arkansas	W 101–79	1–0	Pauley Pavilion; Los Angeles, CA
December 1, 1973*	No. 1	No. 4 Maryland	W 65–64	2–0	Pauley Pavilion; Los Angeles, CA
December 8, 1973*	No. 1	SMU	W 77–60	3–0	Pauley Pavilion; Los Angeles, CA
December 15, 1973*; ABC	No. 1	vs. No. 2 North Carolina State	W 84–66	4–0	St. Louis Arena; St. Louis, MO
December 21, 1973*	No. 1	Ohio	W 110–63	5–0	Pauley Pavilion; Los Angeles, CA
December 22, 1973*	No. 1	St. Bonaventure	W 111–59	6–0	Pauley Pavilion; Los Angeles, CA
December 28, 1973*	No. 1	Wyoming; Bruin Classic	W 86–58	7–0	Pauley Pavilion; Los Angeles, CA
December 29, 1973*	No. 1	Michigan; Bruin Classic	W 90–70	8–0	Pauley Pavilion; Los Angeles, CA
January 5, 1974	No. 1	at Washington	W 100–48	9–0 (1–0)	Hec Edmundson Pavilion; Seattle, WA
January 7, 1974	No. 1	at Washington State	W 55–45	10–0 (2–0)	Performing Arts Colliseum; Pullman, WA
January 11, 1974	No. 1	California	W 92–56	11–0 (3–0)	Pauley Pavilion; Los Angeles, CA
January 12, 1974	No. 1	Stanford	W 66–52	12–0 (4–0)	Pauley Pavilion; Los Angeles, CA
January 17, 1974*	No. 1	vs. Iowa	W 68–44	13–0	Chicago Stadium; Chicago, IL
January 19, 1974*; TVS	No. 1	at Notre Dame	L 70–71	13–1	Athletic & Convocation Center; Notre Dame, IN
January 25, 1974*	No. 2	Santa Clara	W 96–54	14–1	Pauley Pavilion; Los Angeles, CA
January 26, 1974*	No. 1	Notre Dame	W 94–75	15–1	Pauley Pavilion; Los Angeles, CA
February 2, 1974	No. 1	No. 11 USC	W 65–54	16–1 (5–0)	Pauley Pavilion; Los Angeles, CA
February 8, 1974	No. 1	Oregon	W 84–66	17–1 (6–0)	Pauley Pavilion; Los Angeles, CA
February 9, 1974	No. 1	Oregon State	W 80–75	18–1 (7–0)	Pauley Pavilion; Los Angeles, CA
February 15, 1974	No. 1	at Oregon State	L 57–61	18–2 (7–1)	Gill Coliseum; Corvallis, OR
February 16, 1974	No. 1	at Oregon	L 51–56	18–3 (7–2)	McArthur Court; Eugene, OR
February 22, 1974	No. 3	Washington State	W 93–68	19–3 (8–2)	Pauley Pavilion; Los Angeles, CA
February 23, 1974	No. 3	Washington	W 99–65	20–3 (9–2)	Pauley Pavilion; Los Angeles, CA
March 1, 1974	No. 3	at California	W 83–60	21–3 (10–2)	Harmon Gym; Berkeley, CA
March 2, 1974	No. 3	at Stanford	W 62–60	22–3 (11–2)	Maples Pavilion; Stanford, CA
March 9, 1974	No. 3	at No. 7 USC	W 82–52	23–3 (12–2)	Los Angeles Memorial Sports Arena; Los Angeles, CA
NCAA Tournament
March 14, 1974*	No. 2	vs. No. 20 Dayton; Regional semifinal	W 111–100 ^{3OT}	24–3	McKale Center; Tucson, AZ
March 16, 1974*	No. 2	vs. San Francisco; Regional Final	W 83–60	25–3	McKale Center; Tucson, AZ
March 23, 1974*; NBC	No. 2	vs. No. 1 North Carolina State; National semifinal	L 77–80 ^{2OT}	25–4	Greensboro Coliseum; Greensboro, NC
March 25, 1974*	No. 2	vs. No. 6 Kansas; Consolation Game	W 78–61	26–4	Greensboro Coliseum; Greensboro, NC
*Non-conference game. ^{#}Rankings from AP Poll. (#) Tournament seedings in parentheses. All times are in Pacific Time.

== Rankings ==
Ranking movements Legend: ██ Increase in ranking ██ Decrease in ranking
	Week																	
Poll	Pre	1	2	3	4	5	6	7	8	9	10	11	12	13	14	15	16	Final
AP	1	1	1	1	1	1	1	1	2	1	1	1	3	3	3	2	2	2
Coaches	Not released		1	1	1	1	1	1	2	1	1	1	3	3	3	2	Not released	

== Awards and honors ==
- Bill Walton, USBWA College Player of the Year
- Bill Walton, Naismith College Player of the Year
- Bill Walton, Adolph Rupp Trophy

== Team players drafted into the NBA ==
Round	Pick	Player	NBA Team
1	1	Bill Walton	Portland Trail Blazers
1	11	Keith Wilkes	Golden State Warriors
7	115	Greg Lee	Atlanta Hawks
7	117	Tommy Curtis	Buffalo Braves
