= 1974–75 UCLA Bruins men's basketball team =

American college basketball season

1974–75 UCLA Bruins men's basketball

NCAA tournament National champions AP Poll regular season champions Pac-8 champions Maryland Invitational champions

National Championship Game, W 92–85 vs. Kentucky
- Conference: Pacific-8 Conference

Ranking
- Coaches: No. 2
- AP: No. 1
- Record: 28–3 (12–2 Pac-8)
- Head coach: John Wooden (27th season)
- Assistant coach: Gary Cunningham
- Home arena: Pauley Pavilion

1974–75 Pacific-8 Conference men's basketball standings
	Conf.				Overall
Team	W		L	PCT	W		L	PCT
No. 1 UCLA	12	–	2	.857	28	–	3	.903
No. 18 Oregon State	10	–	4	.714	19	–	12	.613
USC	8	–	6	.571	18	–	8	.692
California	7	–	7	.500	17	–	9	.654
Oregon	6	–	8	.429	21	–	9	.700
Washington	6	–	8	.429	16	–	10	.615
Stanford	6	–	8	.429	12	–	14	.462
Washington State	1	–	13	.071	10	–	16	.385
Rankings from AP Poll

The 1974–75 UCLA Bruins men's basketball team represented the University of California, Los Angeles during the 1974–75 NCAA Division I men's basketball season. They were led by John R. Wooden in his 27th and final season as UCLA head coach.

The Bruins defeated Michigan in the first round of the NCAA Tournament. In the West Regional, UCLA beat Montana and Arizona State to advance to the Final Four. Richard Washington scored 26 points to give UCLA an overtime victory over Louisville, 75–74, in the national semifinal. After the game, Coach Wooden announced that the championship game would be his last game.

In the title game, the Bruins won their tenth National Championship in twelve years over the Kentucky Wildcats, 92–85, at the San Diego Sports Arena in San Diego, California.

== Season summary ==
This UCLA team was far from the most talented coached by the legendary John Wooden. It was a team without superstars, in fact, but it turned out to be one of Wooden's favorites, for it sent him into retirement with a 92–85 victory over Kentucky in the 1975 National Title game behind center Richard Washington’s 28 points. Wooden includes this team in his list of favorite teams in his book Practical Modern Basketball. He says that "the Championship merely added more 'frosting'". The championship was Wooden’s tenth, a record which still stands for men's coaches. Geno Auriemma of Connecticut broke the overall basketball record by winning his 11th title in 2016.

== Roster ==
1974–75 UCLA Bruins men's basketball team
Players
Coaches

Pos.	#	Name	Height	Weight	Year	Hometown
G	30	David Byrum	6 ft 4 in (1.93 m)	—	So
C	35	Ralph Drollinger	7 ft 1 in (2.16 m)	250 lb (113 kg)	Jr	La Mesa, California
F	54	Marques Johnson	6 ft 6 in (1.98 m)	218 lb (99 kg)	So	Natchitoches, Louisiana
G	45	Andre McCarter	6 ft 2 in (1.88 m)	190 lb (86 kg)	Jr	Philadelphia, Pennsylvania
F	34	Dave Meyers (C)	6 ft 7 in (2.01 m)	215 lb (98 kg)	Sr	San Diego, CA
F	53	Wilbert Olinde	6 ft 6 in (1.98 m)	—	So
F	55	Gavin Smith	6 ft 5 in (1.96 m)	—	So	San Fernando Valley, California
G	44	Jim Spillane	5 ft 11 in (1.8 m)	—	So
G	25	Pete Trgovich	6 ft 5 in (1.96 m)	—	Sr
C	32	Brett Vroman	6 ft 11 in (2.11 m)	220 lb (100 kg)	Fr	Hollywood, California
F	31	Richard Washington	6 ft 9 in (2.06 m)	220 lb (100 kg)	So	Portland, Oregon

Head coach

John Wooden (Purdue)

Assistant coach(es)

Gary Cunningham (UCLA)

Legend

- (C) Team captain
- (S) Suspended
- (I) Ineligible
- (W) Walk-on
- Injured
- Current redshirt

Roster

== Schedule ==
Date time, TV	Rank^{#}	Opponent^{#}	Result	Record	Site city, state
Regular Season
November 29, 1974*	No. 2	Wichita State	W 85-74	1–0	Pauley Pavilion (12,014); Los Angeles, CA
November 30, 1974*	No. 2	DePaul	W 79-64	2–0	Pauley Pavilion (12,101); Los Angeles, CA
December 6, 1974*	No. 2	Loyola–Chicago	W 84-67	3–0	Pauley Pavilion (12,102); Los Angeles, CA
December 7, 1974*	No. 2	Oklahoma State	W 82-51	4–0	Pauley Pavilion (12,008); Los Angeles, CA
December 20, 1974*	No. 3	No. 11 Memphis State	W 113-94	5–0	Pauley Pavilion (12,295); Los Angeles, CA
December 21, 1974*	No. 3	No. 12 Notre Dame	W 85-72	6–0	Pauley Pavilion (12,673); Los Angeles, CA
December 27, 1974*	No. 3	vs. St. Bonaventure; Maryland Invitational Tournament	W 73-62	7–0	Cole Field House (14,500); College Park, MD
December 28, 1974*	No. 3	vs. No. 5 Maryland; Maryland Invitational Tournament	W 81-75	8–0	Cole Field House (14,500); College Park, MD
January 3, 1975*	No. 3	Davidson	W 91-64	9-0	Pauley Pavilion (12,037); Los Angeles, CA
January 4, 1975*	No. 3	Oklahoma	W 111-66	10-0	Pauley Pavilion (12,407); Los Angeles, CA
January 9, 1975	No. 2	Washington	W 92-82	11-0 (1–0)	Pauley Pavilion (12,685); Los Angeles, CA
January 11, 1975	No. 2	Washington State	W 77-69	12-0 (2–0)	Pauley Pavilion (12,357); Los Angeles, CA
January 17, 1975	No. 2	at Stanford	L 60-64	12-1 (2–1)	Maples Pavilion (7,803); Stanford, CA
January 18, 1975	No. 2	California	W 102-72	13-1 (3–1)	Harmon Gym (6,200); Berkeley, CA
January 23, 1975*	No. 4	UC Santa Barbara	W 104-76	14–1	Pauley Pavilion (12,011); Los Angeles, CA
January 25, 1975*	No. 4	at Notre Dame	L 78-84	14-2	Athletic & Convocation Center (11,345); Notre Dame, IN
February 1, 1975	No. 4	No. 6 USC	W 89-84	15–2 (4–1)	Pauley Pavilion (12,884); Los Angeles, CA
February 7, 1975	No. 2	at Oregon State	W 67-60	16-2 (5–1)	Gill Coliseum (10,095); Corvallis, OR
February 8, 1975	No. 2	at No. 9 Oregon	W 107-103	17-2 (6–1)	McArthur Court (10,000); Eugene, OR
February 14, 1975	No. 2	Oregon	W 95-66	18-2 (7–1)	Pauley Pavilion (12,451); Los Angeles, CA
February 15, 1975	No. 2	No. 17 Oregon State	W 74-62	19-2 (8–1)	Pauley Pavilion (12,762); Los Angeles, CA
February 20, 1975	No. 2	at Washington State	W 69-61	20-2 (9–1)	Performing Arts Coliseum (7,100); Pullman, WA
February 22, 1975	No. 2	at Washington	L 81-103	20-3 (9–2)	Hec Edmundson Pavilion (10,000); Seattle, WA
February 28, 1975	No. 5	California	W 51-47	21-3 (10–2)	Pauley Pavilion (12,392); Los Angeles, CA
March 1, 1975	No. 5	Stanford	W 93-59	22-3 (11–2)	Pauley Pavilion (12,833); Los Angeles, CA
March 8, 1975	No. 4	at No. 11 USC	W 72-68	23–3 (12–2)	Los Angeles Memorial Sports Arena (14,044); Los Angeles, CA
NCAA Tournament
March 15, 1975*	No. 2	vs. Michigan; Regional First round	W 103-91 ^{OT}	24–3	Performing Arts Coliseum (10,150); Pullman, WA
March 20, 1975*	No. 2	vs. Montana; Regional semifinal	W 67-64	25-3	Veterans Memorial Coliseum (9,797); Portland, OR
March 22, 1975*	No. 2	vs. No. 7 Arizona State; Regional Final	W 89-75	26-3	Veterans Memorial Coliseum (8,534); Portland, OR
March 29, 1975*	No. 1	vs. No. 4 Louisville; National semifinal	W 75-74 ^{OT}	27-3	San Diego Sports Arena (15,151); San Diego, CA
March 31, 1975*	No. 1	vs. No. 2 Kentucky; National Final	W 92-85	28-3	San Diego Sports Arena (15,151); San Diego, CA
*Non-conference game. ^{#}Rankings from AP Poll. (#) Tournament seedings in parentheses.

== Notes ==
- The team won their first 12 games before Stanford pulled an upset on the Bruins.
- The NCAA first round was held at Pullman, Washington; West Regional at Portland, Oregon.
- "He (Coach Wooden) never made more than $35,000 a year, including 1975, the year he won his 10th national championship, and never asked for a raise," wrote Rick Reilly of ESPN.
- Richard Washington was named NCAA basketball tournament Most Outstanding Player.
