= Malik Dime =

Senegalese basketball player

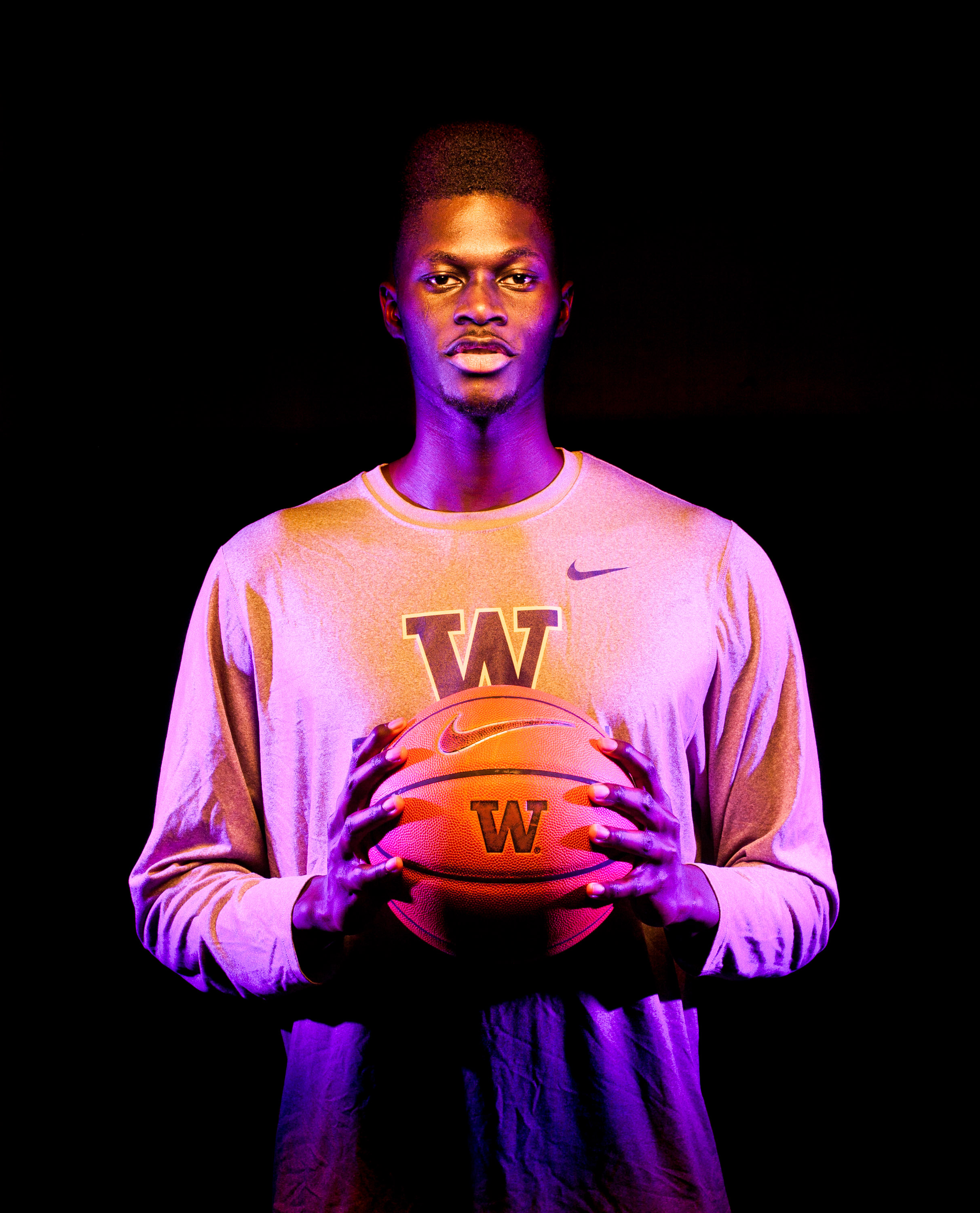
- Dime with the Washington Huskies in 2016

Personal information
- Born: 6 October 1992 (age 34) Dakar, Senegal
- Listed height: 2.06 m (6 ft 9 in)
- Listed weight: 100 kg (220 lb)

Career information
- High school: Columbus (Columbus, Ohio); New Hope Christian (Thomasville, North Carolina)
- College: Indian Hils CC (2013–2015); Washington (2015–2017)
- NBA draft: 2017: undrafted
- Playing career: 2017–present
- Position: Center

Career history
- 2017: Northern Arizona Suns
- 2018: Vogošća
- 2018: Ura
- 2018–2019: Rilski Sportist
- 2019: Guaros de Lara
- 2019: Kyiv
- 2019–2020: Lavrio
- 2020–2021: Andorra
- 2021: Maccabi Rishon LeZion
- 2021–2022: Vanoli Cremona
- 2022–2023: Parma Basket
- 2023: Gladiadores de Anzoátegui
- 2023–2024: Peñarol
- 2024: Granada
- 2024: Gladiadores de Anzoátegui
- 2024: Diablos Rojos del México
- 2025: Dewa United Banten
- 2025: Diablos Rojos del México

Career highlights
- VTB United League All-Star Game MVP (2023); SPB champion (2022); LBA blocks leader (2022); Bulgarian League Blocks Leader (2019); Bosnian League Blocks Leader (2018)

Pape Malick Dime (born 6 October 1992) is a Senegalese professional basketball player who last played for the Dewa United Banten of the Indonesian Basketball League (IBL). He played college basketball for Indian Hills Community College and Washington Huskies. Dime entered the 2017 NBA draft, but was not selected in the draft's two rounds.

== College career ==
=== Indian Hills ===
Dime chose to play college basketball for Indian Hils college after finishing highschool at New Hope Christian Academy. As a sophomore, he averaged 10.8 points and 7.1 rebounds and 3.3 blocks per game in 30 games making 60.7 percent of his shots from the field.

=== Washington ===
At his junior season, he was transferred to Washington Huskies, where he stayed for two seasons. During his tenure with the Huskies, he played along with players like Markelle Fultz, Matisse Thybulle, Marquese Chriss and Dejounte Murray. As a senior, Dime became the captain of the team and averaged 5.5 points, 5.4 rebounds and 2.4 blocks per game in 20 games.

== Professional career ==
After going undrafted at the 2017 NBA draft Dime joined the Northern Arizona Suns. He was waived on 12 December 2017, after appearing only in 7 games. He then joined Vogošća of the Bosnian League. He led the league in blocks, after averaging 4 blocks per game in only 16 games.

The next season, he signed with Ura opf the Korisliiga. He left the club on December and joined Rilski Sportist of the NBL. He also led the league in blocks, averaging 2.5 per game. During the summer, he also joined Guaros de Lara.

On 13 October 2019, he signed with Kyiv of the Ukrainian SuperLeague, but left the team after only appearing in 1 game. On 16 November 2019, he joined Lavrio of the Greek Basket League.

On 9 July 2020, Dime signed with MoraBanc Andorra of the Spanish Liga ACB. He averaged 5.8 points, 3.3 rebounds and 1.7 blocks per game. The team parted ways with him on 1 July 2021.

On 29 August 2021, Dime signed with Maccabi Rishon LeZion of the Israeli Basketball Premier League. He parted ways with the team on 29 November, after averaging 7.4 points, 7.4 rebounds and 1.6 blocks per game. On 2 December, Dime signed with Vanoli Cremona of the Italian Lega Basket Serie A (LBA).

On 1 July 2022, he signed with Parma Basket of the VTB United League.

On 27 December 2024, Dime joined the Dewa United Banten of the Indonesian Basketball League for the 2025 season, replacing Prince Ibeh. On 25 March 2025, he parted ways with the team.
