= 1971–72 Washington Huskies men's basketball team =

American college basketball season

1971–72 Washington Huskies men's basketball
- Conference: Pacific-8 Conference
- Record: 20–6 (10–4 Pac-8)
- Head coach: Marv Harshman (1st season)
- Home arena: Hec Edmundson Pavilion

1971–72 Pacific-8 Conference men's basketball standings
	Conf.				Overall
Team	W		L	PCT	W		L	PCT
No. 1 UCLA	14	–	0	1.000	30	–	0	1.000
Washington	10	–	4	.714	20	–	6	.769
Oregon State	9	–	5	.643	18	–	10	.643
USC	9	–	5	.643	16	–	10	.615
California	6	–	8	.429	13	–	16	.448
Stanford	5	–	9	.357	10	–	15	.400
Washington State	3	–	11	.214	11	–	15	.423
Oregon	0	–	14	.000	6	–	20	.231
As of April 15, 1972; Rankings from AP Poll

The 1971–72 Washington Huskies men's basketball team represented the University of Washington for the 1971–72 NCAA college basketball season. Led by first-year head coach Marv Harshman, the Huskies were members of the Pacific-8 Conference and played their home games on campus at Hec Edmundson Pavilion in Seattle, Washington.

The Huskies were 20–6 overall in the regular season and 10–4 in conference play, second in the standings; it was Washington's best season in nineteen years. The 25-team NCAA tournament included only one Pac-8 team, champion UCLA. The Huskies did not play in the 16-team National Invitation Tournament (NIT) because the Pac-8 did not allow it. This rule was changed after this season and USC played in the NIT in 1973.

Previous head coach Tex Winter left in May 1971 to become head coach of the NBA's San Diego Rockets, who moved to Houston the next month. Harshman was hired in June, and led the Huskies for fourteen seasons. He was previously the head coach at rival Washington State for thirteen years, preceded by thirteen years at his alma mater, Pacific Lutheran.

== Roster ==
1971–72 Washington Huskies men's basketball team
Players
Coaches

Pos.	#	Name	Height	Weight	Year	Hometown
G	32	Charles Dudley	6 ft 2 in (1.88 m)	186 lb (84 kg)	Sr	Harrisburg, PA
F	43	Jeff Hawes	6 ft 7 in (2.01 m)	200 lb (91 kg)	So	Mercer Island
C	33	Steve Hawes	6 ft 9 in (2.06 m)	229 lb (104 kg)	Sr	Mercer Island
G	15	Louis Nelson	6 ft 3 in (1.91 m)	192 lb (87 kg)	Jr	Compton, CA
F	10	Paul Tillman	6 ft 5 in (1.96 m)	188 lb (85 kg)	Sr	Long Beach, CA

Head coach

- Marv Harshman

Assistant coach(es)

Legend

- (C) Team captain
- (S) Suspended
- (I) Ineligible
- (W) Walk-on
- Injured
- Current redshirt
