= Bishop Ryan Catholic School =

Location
- 316 11th Avenue NW; Minot, North Dakota 58703; United States
- Coordinates: 48°14′52″N 101°17′53″W

Information
- Type: Private school
- Motto: Inspired Minds. Faithful Hearts. Lives of Virtue.
- Religious affiliation: Roman Catholic
- Established: 1958; 68 years ago
- Oversight: Diocese of Bismarck
- NCES School ID: 01042709
- President: Jadyn Nelson
- Teaching staff: 34.1 (on an FTE basis)
- Grades: PK–12
- Gender: Co-educational
- Enrollment: 432 (2017–2018)
- Student to teacher ratio: 9.8
- Colors: Purple & White
- Athletics conference: North Dakota High School Activities Association
- Mascot: Lion
- Nickname: Lions
- Accreditation: Cognia
- Website: bishopryan.com

Bishop Ryan Catholic School is a PK–12 private, Roman Catholic, co-educational school in Minot, North Dakota, United States. Established in 1958, it is within the Diocese of Bismarck, and named for Vincent James Ryan, the second bishop of the diocese. The campus in north Minot is directly east of Minot State University.

After the 2011 Souris River flood and the flooding of the Little Flower Elementary campus, the preschool and elementary students were moved to Bishop Ryan, resulting in North Dakota's first Catholic PK-12 school.

== Athletics ==
Bishop Ryan's mascot is a lion, with the girls' teams referred to as the Lady Lions. The school has sports programs in football, golf, volleyball, cheerleading, track and field, baseball, softball, basketball, cross-country, and wrestling. The school competes in the Class B division, except for football in Class A.

Bishop Ryan's head coach in basketball from 1959 to 1964 was 24-year-old Dale Brown, later the head coach at LSU for 25 seasons (1972–97). Ryan's head coach in football from 1960 to 1962 was Ron Erhardt, later the head coach for the North Dakota State University Bison, New England Patriots and the offensive coordinator for the Pittsburgh Steelers, New York Giants and the New York Jets.

== Notable alumni ==
- Dale Brown, hall of fame college basketball coach, class of 1953 (St. Leo's)
- Mark Slater, NFL center for the San Diego Chargers (1978) and Philadelphia Eagles (1979–83), class of 1973
- John Hoeven, U.S. Senator (2011– ), class of 1975
