= 1974–75 Washington Huskies men's basketball team =

American college basketball season

1974–75 Washington Huskies men's basketball
- Conference: Pacific-8 Conference
- Record: 16–10 (6–8 Pac-8)
- Head coach: Marv Harshman (4th season)
- Home arena: Hec Edmundson Pavilion

1974–75 Pacific-8 Conference men's basketball standings
	Conf.				Overall
Team	W		L	PCT	W		L	PCT
No. 1 UCLA	12	–	2	.857	28	–	3	.903
No. 18 Oregon State	10	–	4	.714	19	–	12	.613
USC	8	–	6	.571	18	–	8	.692
California	7	–	7	.500	17	–	9	.654
Oregon	6	–	8	.429	21	–	9	.700
Washington	6	–	8	.429	16	–	10	.615
Stanford	6	–	8	.429	12	–	14	.462
Washington State	1	–	13	.071	10	–	16	.385
Rankings from AP Poll

The 1974–75 Washington Huskies men's basketball team represented the University of Washington for the 1974–75 NCAA Division I men's basketball season. Led by fourth-year head coach Marv Harshman, the Huskies were members of the Pacific-8 Conference and played their home games on campus at Hec Edmundson Pavilion in Seattle, Washington.

The Huskies were 16–10 overall in the regular season and 6–8 in conference play, tied for fifth in the standings.
