= Matisse Thybulle =

Australian-American basketball player (born 1997)

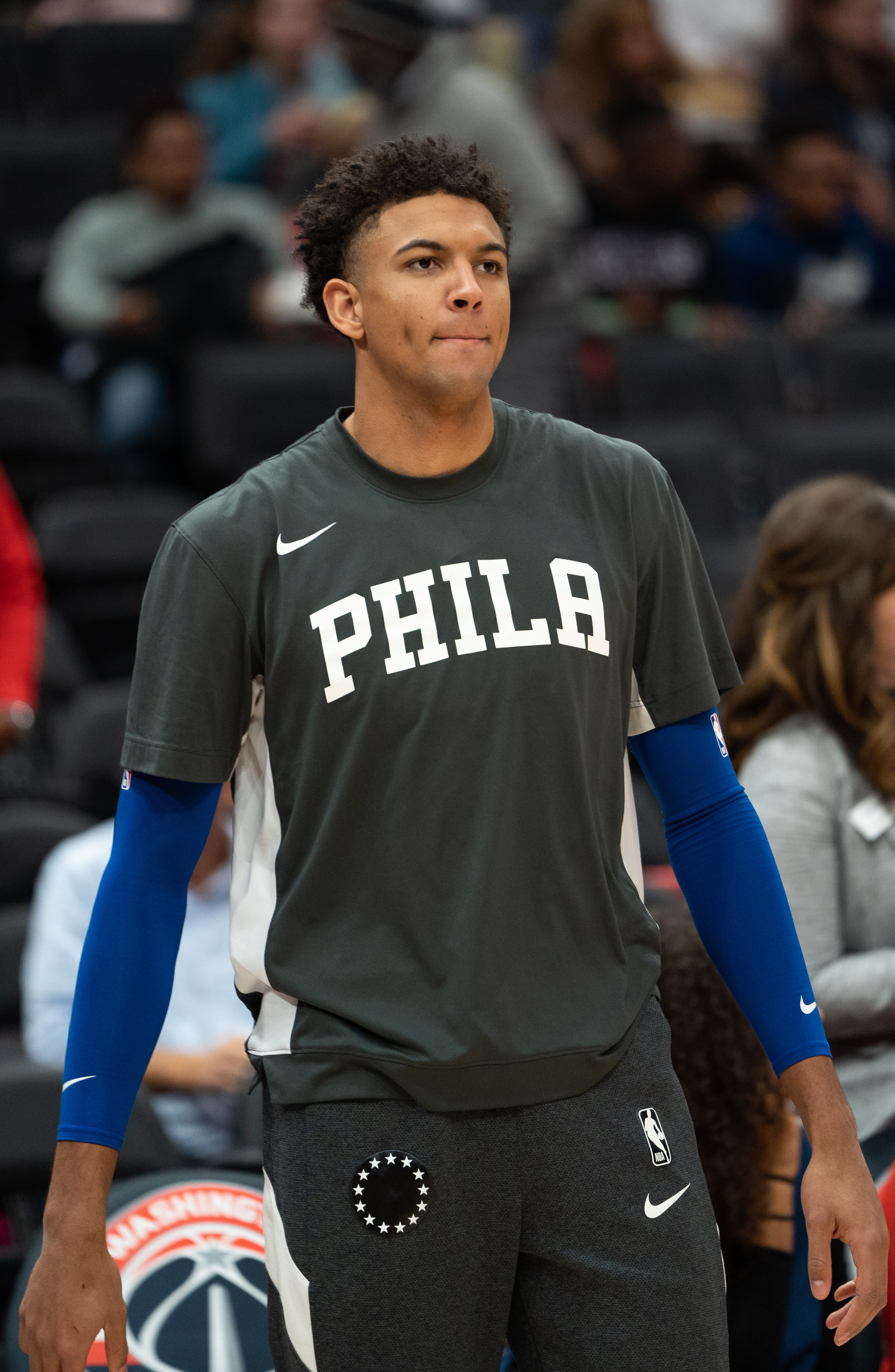
- Thybulle with the Philadelphia 76ers in 2019

No. 4 – Los Angeles Lakers
- Position: Shooting guard / small forward
- League: NBA

Personal information
- Born: March 4, 1997 (age 29) Scottsdale, Arizona, U.S.
- Listed height: 6 ft 5 in (1.96 m)
- Listed weight: 202 lb (92 kg)

Career information
- High school: Eastside Catholic (Sammamish, Washington)
- College: Washington (2015–2019)
- NBA draft: 2019: 1st round, 20th overall pick
- Drafted by: Boston Celtics
- Playing career: 2019–present

Career history
- 2019–2023: Philadelphia 76ers
- 2023–2026: Portland Trail Blazers
- 2026–present: Los Angeles Lakers

Career highlights
- 2× NBA All-Defensive Second Team (2021, 2022); Naismith Defensive Player of the Year (2019); Lefty Driesell Award (2019); NCAA steals leader (2019); First-team All-Pac-12 (2019); 2× Pac-12 Defensive Player of the Year (2018, 2019); 2× Pac-12 All-Defensive Team (2018, 2019)
- Stats at NBA.com
- Stats at Basketball Reference
Medals
Men's basketball
Representing Australia
Olympic Games
Bronze medal – third place	2020 Tokyo	Team

Matisse Vincent Thybulle (/məˈtiːs ˈθaɪbəl/ mə-TEESS THYBE-əl; born March 4, 1997) is an Australian-American professional basketball player for the Los Angeles Lakers of the National Basketball Association (NBA). He was selected in the first round of the 2019 NBA draft by the Boston Celtics before being traded to the Philadelphia 76ers the following day. Thybulle was named to the NBA All-Defensive Second Team as a member of the 76ers in 2021 and 2022. He was traded to the Portland Trail Blazers in 2023.

Thybulle played college basketball for the Washington Huskies. As a senior in 2019, he was recognized as the top defender in the nation with the Naismith Defensive Player of the Year and the Lefty Driesell Award. Thybulle also earned first-team all-conference honors in the Pac-12, and repeated as the Pac-12 Defensive Player of the Year.

Thybulle is a dual American-Australian citizen and spent seven years of his childhood in Sydney. He won a bronze medal as a member of the Australian national team at the 2020 Summer Olympics in Tokyo.

== Early life ==
Thybulle was born in Scottsdale, Arizona, the son of Greg, a Haitian-born engineer raised in the Harlem neighborhood of New York, and Dr. Elizabeth Thybulle, a naturopath who died of leukemia in 2015. He was named after French artist Henri Matisse. In 1998, his family moved to Sydney, Australia, where they lived for seven years. The Thybulle family lived in Sydney's North Shore while in Australia and the children attended elementary school at North Sydney Demonstration School. Matisse did not play much basketball in Australia and focused more on swimming while there, where he said lifeguards "were a really big deal." His family returned to the U.S. in 2005 and settled in Sammamish, Washington, a suburb east of Seattle.

Thybulle could not make layups consistently until around the eighth grade, when his coordination began matching his speed. He attended Skyline High School for two years, then transferred to nearby Eastside Catholic, where he was ranked a four-star recruit by Scout.com and three-star by ESPN, and graduated in 2015. In 2024, Thybulle's Eastside Catholic High school jersey number was retired.

== College career ==
Thybulle chose to attend the University of Washington in Seattle based on his relationship with Huskies coach Lorenzo Romar. He started all 34 games as a true freshman in 2015–16, averaging 6.2 points, 3.2 rebounds, and 1.6 assists in 24.1 minutes per game. As a sophomore in 2016–17, he averaged 10.5 points, 3.1 rebounds, and 2.1 steals, but the Huskies won only two games in conference and were 9–22 in Romar's fifteenth season at Washington, and he was fired.

Thybulle considered leaving the program after his coach left. However, he decided to return for 2017–18 after meeting with new coach Mike Hopkins. The former 22-year Syracuse assistant under Jim Boeheim sold him on the Orange's acclaimed 2–3 zone defense that he planned to install at Washington. On February 17, Thybulle scored a career-high 26 points in an 82–59 win over Colorado. Possessing a 7-foot (2.1 m) wingspan, he was instrumental to the Huskies' zone defense, which was a key to the team's first 20-win season since 2011–12. He was named the Pac-12 Defensive Player of the Year, becoming the first player in school history to receive the honor. Thybulle averaged a career-high 11.2 points per game, set a Huskies single-season record with 101 steals, and led Washington with a team-leading 49 blocks. He became the second player in Pac-12 history with at least 90 steals and 40 blocks in the same season, joining Jeff Trepagnier (USC, 1999–2000).

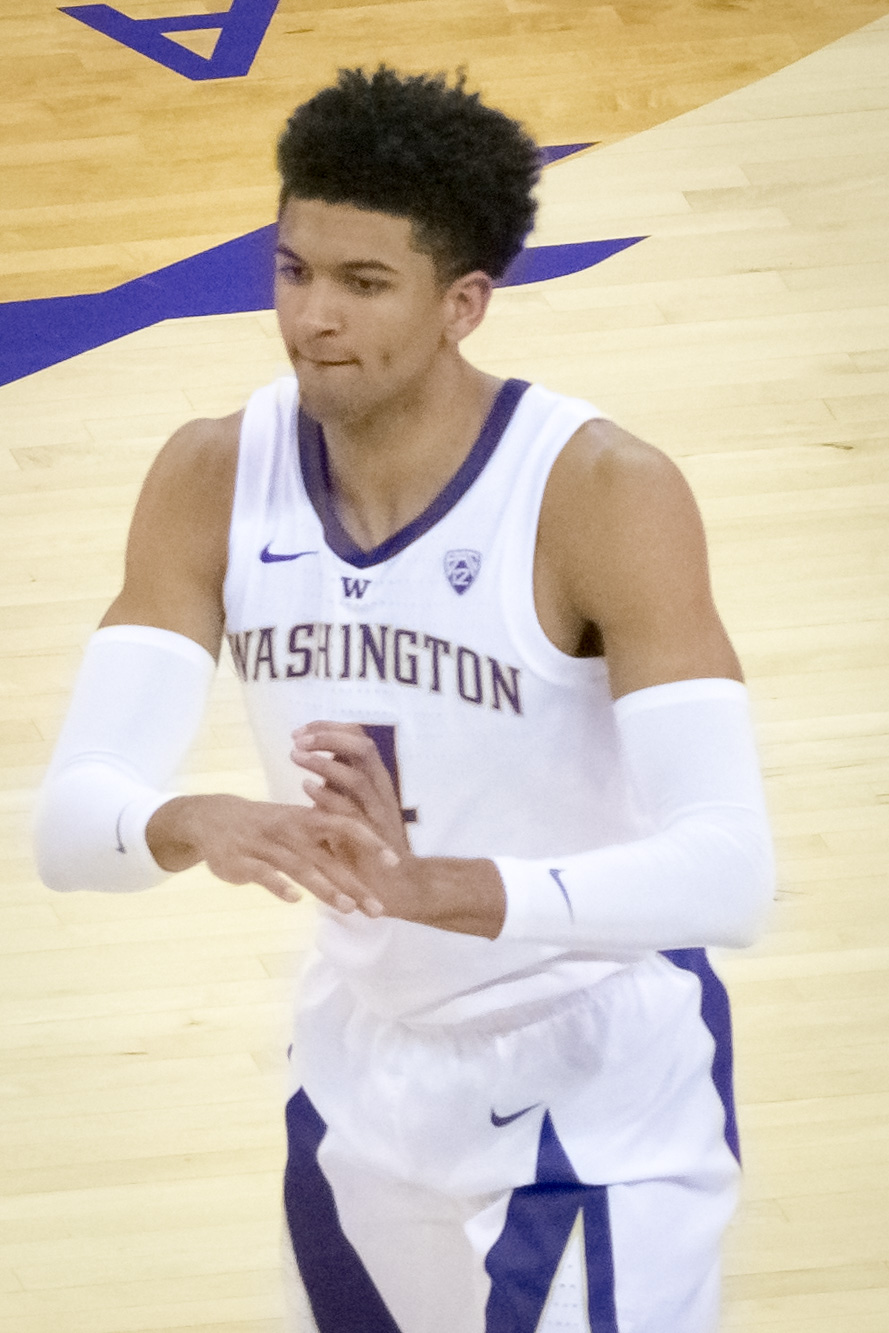
Thybulle in 2019

In 2018–19, Thybulle had 17 points, six steals and five blocks in a 64–55 home win over Colorado to help the Huskies clinch a share of the Pac-12 regular season title. Including a win earlier in the week against Utah, he averaged 13.5 points, 6.0 steals, 4.5 blocks and 5.0 rebounds to earn Pac-12 Player of the Week honors for the first time in his career. Thybulle won the Naismith Defensive Player of the Year and Lefty Driesell Award as the top defensive player in the nation. He was also named first-team All-Pac-12, and became the second player in conference history to repeat as Pac-12 Defensive Player of the Year. He led all NCAA Division I players with 126 steals, which also broke the Pac-12 single-season record held previously by Jason Kidd. Thybulle also ranked eighth nationally with 83 blocks, becoming the only player in the past two decades to record at least 100 steals and 80 blocks. With averages of 3.5 steals and 2.3 blocks per game, he was one of three players in the last 20 years to average at least 2.0 steals and 2.0 blocks in a season. (Note: He joined Shane Battier (1999–2000 and 2000–01) of Duke and Nerlens Noel (2012–13) of Kentucky.) Thybulle also passed Gary Payton to become the conference leader in career steals with 331, and was the first in Pac-12 history with two 100-steal seasons. He also tied Washington's career blocks record of 186 held by Chris Welp, and he is the only player in Huskies history ranked in the top 10 in both career steals and blocks.

== Professional career ==
=== Philadelphia 76ers (2019–2023) ===
The Philadelphia 76ers targeted Thybulle leading up to the 2019 NBA draft. They were coming off a second-round playoff loss to the eventual NBA champions, the Toronto Raptors, and were seeking someone who could immediately contribute to their goal of a championship. The 76ers had Thybulle stop working out for other teams, promising in exchange to select him in the first round with their No. 24 overall pick. They effectively ended up moving up to No. 20 to select him, receiving his draft rights from the Boston Celtics in a trade for Philadelphia's 24th and 33rd picks. On July 3, 2019, Thybulle signed with the 76ers. On October 23, he made his debut in NBA, coming off from bench in a 107–93 win over the Celtics with three points, a rebound, an assist, two steals and two blocks. After scoring 20 points, hitting five three-pointers, and making three steals in a win over the Raptors on December 8, he joined Allen Iverson as the only Sixers rookies to record five threes and three steals in a game since 1983. On July 11, 2020, Thybulle started uploading a series of vlog style YouTube videos showcasing the 2020 NBA Bubble at the ESPN Wide World of Sports Complex in Orlando, Florida.

In his second season in 2020–21, Thybulle was named to the NBA All-Defensive Second Team, though he only averaged 20 minutes per game. He was the NBA leader with 3.8 steals per 100 possessions as well as 5.6 deflections per 36 minutes.

On October 29, 2021, the 76ers picked up Thybulle's team option, extending his contract through the 2022–23 season.

=== Portland Trail Blazers (2023–2026) ===
On February 9, 2023, Thybulle was traded to the Portland Trail Blazers in a four-team trade involving the Charlotte Hornets and New York Knicks. He made his Trail Blazers debut on February 13, recording 14 points, six rebounds, two assists and three blocks in a 127–115 win over the Los Angeles Lakers. In 22 starts for the team, Thybulle averaged 7.4 points, 3.5 rebounds, and 1.9 assists. Following the season, Thybulle became a restricted free agent, and sign a three-year, $33 million offer sheet with the Dallas Mavericks, which the Trail Blazers subsequently matched.

On October 31, 2025, it was announced that Thybulle would miss 4-to-6 weeks after undergoing surgery to repair a torn ulnar collateral ligament in his left thumb. Thybulle made 30 appearances for Portland during the 2025–26 season, recording averages of 5.8 points, 2.0 rebounds, and 0.9 assists.

=== Los Angeles Lakers (2026–present) ===
On July 20, 2026, Thybulle signed a one-year, $3.3 million contract with the Los Angeles Lakers. On October 21, he made his Lakers debut, logging three points and three rebounds in a 127–105 win over the Golden State Warriors.

== National team career ==
Thybulle is a dual citizen of Australia as well as the United States and is therefore eligible to represent either national team. When asked if he would represent the Australian Boomers at the 2020 Tokyo Olympics, Thybulle said he was proud of his Australian roots but would not presume he would earn automatic selection.

On February 3, 2021, Thybulle was named as part of the Australian Boomers squad for the delayed 2020 Tokyo Olympics, which began immediately after the 2021 NBA Finals. Thybulle helped Australia to obtain their first ever Olympic medal in men's basketball, beating Slovenia in the bronze medal game.

== Career statistics ==
Legend
GP	Games played	GS	Games started	MPG	Minutes per game
FG%	Field goal percentage	3P%	3-point field goal percentage	FT%	Free throw percentage
RPG	Rebounds per game	APG	Assists per game	SPG	Steals per game
BPG	Blocks per game	PPG	Points per game	**Bold**	Career high

*	Led NCAA Division I

=== NBA ===
==== Regular season ====
Year	Team	GP	GS	MPG	FG%	3P%	FT%	RPG	APG	SPG	BPG	PPG
2019–20	Philadelphia	65	14	19.8	.423	.357	.610	1.6	1.2	1.4	.7	4.7
2020–21	Philadelphia	65	8	20.0	.420	.301	.444	1.9	1.0	1.6	**1.1**	3.9
2021–22	Philadelphia	**66**	**50**	25.5	**.500**	.313	.791	2.3	1.1	1.7	**1.1**	5.7
2022–23	Philadelphia	49	6	12.1	.431	.333	.750	1.3	.5	.9	.3	2.7
2022–23	Portland	22	22	**27.7**	.438	.388	.625	**3.5**	1.4	1.7	.8	7.4
2023–24	Portland	65	19	22.9	.397	.346	.759	2.1	1.4	1.7	.8	5.4
2024–25	Portland	15	5	20.8	.477	**.438**	.467	**3.5**	**1.9**	**2.2**	.6	**7.5**
2025–26	Portland	30	0	16.0	.433	.398	**.840**	2.0	.9	2.0	.5	5.8
Career		377	124	20.6	.438	.349	.683	2.0	1.1	1.6	.8	5.0

==== Playoffs ====
Year	Team	GP	GS	MPG	FG%	3P%	FT%	RPG	APG	SPG	BPG	PPG
2020	Philadelphia	4	**1**	**18.8**	.429	.250	–	**1.8**	**.5**	.8	.3	1.8
2021	Philadelphia	**12**	**1**	18.3	**.481**	**.324**	.400	1.4	.3	**1.3**	**.9**	**5.3**
2022	Philadelphia	9	0	15.2	.458	.286	.333	1.0	.4	.8	.8	3.0
2026	Portland	4	0	13.3	.143	.091	**1.000**	2.0	1.0	.8	.8	1.8
Career		29	2	16.7	.423	.270	.500	1.4	.4	1.0	.8	3.6

=== College ===
Year	Team	GP	GS	MPG	FG%	3P%	FT%	RPG	APG	SPG	BPG	PPG
2015–16	Washington	34	34	24.1	.397	.366	.714	**3.2**	1.6	1.1	.9	6.2
2016–17	Washington	31	31	29.9	**.448**	**.405**	.841	3.1	1.8	2.1	.7	10.5
2017–18	Washington	34	33	**32.3**	.445	.365	.714	2.9	**2.6**	3.0	1.4	**11.2**
2018–19	Washington	**36**	**36**	31.1	.415	.305	**.851**	3.1	2.1	**3.5***	**2.3**	9.1
Career		135	134	29.4	.429	.358	.782	3.1	2.0	2.4	1.4	9.2

== Personal life ==
Thybulle is Catholic, having been confirmed as a child.

On April 10, 2022, it went public that Thybulle was not fully vaccinated for COVID-19. This made him ineligible to play in Canada during the 76ers opening round of the NBA playoffs against the Toronto Raptors. "Yeah, I'm not fully vaccinated," he told The Athletic's Rich Hofmann. "This was a decision I made a long time ago. I thought a lot about what I would say here. Essentially I made this choice and I thought I can keep it to myself, I can keep it private, but people are always going to wonder why." Thybulle, who said that he was brought up in a "holistic household" with "Chinese medicine and naturopathic doctors" did say that he had received the first dose of the Pfizer vaccine but did not continue on for the following shot.

== See also ==
- List of NCAA Division I men's basketball season steals leaders
- List of NCAA Division I men's basketball career steals leaders
