= North Dakota Sports Hall of Fame =

Coordinates: 46.9100392°N 98.7047768°W

The North Dakota Sports Hall of Fame is a hall of fame in the US state of North Dakota honoring individuals for athletic achievements. According to the Hall, its purpose is "to honor and recognize those individuals who have played a major role in the growth and development of sports in the state of North Dakota, and to further promote sports and sportsmanship to the public of North Dakota by so honoring those who have made outstanding contributions in sports." The Hall is located in the Jamestown Civic Center in Jamestown, North Dakota.

Inducted in 2016 were American football coach Hank Biesiot; ice hockey players and twin sisters Monique and Jocelyne Lamoureux; and former Major League Baseball player Travis Hafner.
