= 1973–74 Washington Huskies men's basketball team =

American college basketball season

1973–74 Washington Huskies men's basketball
- Conference: Pacific-8 Conference
- Record: 16–10 (7–7 Pac-8)
- Head coach: Marv Harshman (3rd season)
- Home arena: Hec Edmundson Pavilion

1973–74 Pacific-8 Conference men's basketball standings
	Conf.				Overall
Team	W		L	PCT	W		L	PCT
No. 2 UCLA	12	–	2	.857	26	–	4	.867
USC	11	–	3	.786	24	–	5	.828
Oregon	9	–	5	.643	15	–	11	.577
Washington	7	–	7	.500	16	–	10	.615
Oregon State	6	–	8	.429	13	–	13	.500
Stanford	5	–	9	.357	11	–	14	.440
California	3	–	11	.214	9	–	17	.346
Washington State	3	–	11	.214	8	–	21	.276
Rankings from AP Poll

The 1973–74 Washington Huskies men's basketball team represented the University of Washington for the 1973–74 NCAA Division I men's basketball season. Led by third-year head coach Marv Harshman, the Huskies were members of the Pacific-8 Conference and played their home games on campus at Hec Edmundson Pavilion in Seattle, Washington.

The Huskies were 16–10 overall in the regular season and 7–7 in conference play, fourth in the standings.
