= 2001–02 Washington Huskies men's basketball team =

American college basketball season

2001–02 Washington Huskies men's basketball
- Conference: Pacific-10 Conference
- Record: 11–17 (5–13 Pac-10)
- Head coach: Bob Bender (9th season)
- Home arena: Hec Edmundson Pavilion

2001–02 Pacific-10 Conference men's basketball standings
	Conf.				Overall
Team	W		L	PCT	W		L	PCT
No. 6 Oregon	14	–	4	.778	26	–	9	.743
California	12	–	6	.667	23	–	9	.719
No. 10 Arizona†	12	–	6	.667	24	–	10	.706
No. 18 USC	12	–	6	.667	22	–	10	.688
Stanford	12	–	6	.667	20	–	10	.667
No. 20 UCLA	11	–	7	.611	21	–	12	.636
Arizona State	7	–	11	.389	12	–	15	.444
Washington	5	–	13	.278	11	–	17	.393
Oregon State	4	–	14	.222	11	–	17	.393
Washington State	1	–	17	.056	6	–	21	.222
† Conference tournament winner As of July 10, 2011; Rankings from Coaches Poll

The 2001–02 Washington Huskies men's basketball team represented the University of Washington for the 2001–02 NCAA Division I men's basketball season. Led by ninth-year head coach Bob Bender, the Huskies were members of the Pacific-10 Conference and played their home games on campus at Hec Edmundson Pavilion in Seattle, Washington.

The Huskies were 11–16 overall in the regular season and 5–13 in conference play, eighth in the standings. Last played in 1990, the conference tournament resumed this season, with eight teams qualifying. Washington drew top seed Oregon in the opening quarterfinal; the teams had split the season series with home wins. At the Staples Center in Los Angeles, the Huskies led by seven points at the half, but the Ducks dominated the second half and won by 22 points.

Twelve days later, Bender was relieved of his duties by athletic director Barbara Hedges. He was succeeded in early April by alumnus Lorenzo Romar, the head coach at Saint Louis, who led the Husky program for fifteen seasons.

== Postseason result ==
Date time, TV	Opponent	Result	Record	Site (attendance) city, state
Exhibition
Nov 2, 2001; 7:00 pm	Brisbane Capitals (Australia)	W 87–43	–	Hec Edmundson Pavilion; Seattle, Washington
Nov 8, 2001; 7:00 pm	Western Washington	W 81–76	–	Hec Edmundson Pavilion; Seattle, Washington
Non-conference regular season
Nov 15, 2001; 8:00 pm	at Alaska-Fairbanks; Top of the World Classic	W 82–70	1–0	Carlson Center; Fairbanks, Alaska
Nov 18, 2001	vs. Butler; Top of the World Classic	L 64–67	1–1	Carlson Center; Fairbanks, Alaska
Pacific-10 Tournament
Thu, March 7; 1:17 pm, FSN	vs. (1) No. 9 Oregon; Quarterfinal	L 64–86	11–17	Staples Center; Los Angeles, California
*Non-conference game. ^{#}Rankings from AP poll. (#) Tournament seedings in parentheses. All times are in Pacific time.
