= Marv Harshman =

American basketball player and coach (1917–2013)

Biographical details
- Born: October 4, 1917; Eau Claire, Wisconsin, U.S.
- Died: April 12, 2013 (aged 95); Tacoma, Washington, U.S.

Playing career
- 1938–1942: Pacific Lutheran

Coaching career (HC unless noted)

Basketball
- 1945–1958: Pacific Lutheran
- 1958–1971: Washington State
- 1971–1985: Washington

Football
- 1951–1957: Pacific Lutheran

Baseball
- 1954–1958: Pacific Lutheran

Head coaching record
- Overall: 637–444 (basketball); 27–28–2 (football); 32–60 (baseball)
- Tournaments: Basketball; 2–3 (NCAA Division I); 1–2 (NIT)

Accomplishments and honors

Championships
- Basketball; 4 Evergreen (1955–1958); 2 Pac-10 regular season (1984, 1985) Football; 2 Evergreen (1951–1952)

Awards
- Basketball; Coach Wooden "Keys to Life" Award (1998); 2× Pac-10 Coach of the Year (1982, 1984); NABC Coach of the Year (1984)
- Basketball Hall of Fame; Inducted in 1985
- College Basketball Hall of Fame; Inducted in 2006
- Military career
- Allegiance: United States
- Branch: United States Navy
- Service years: 1942–1945
- Conflicts: World War II

Marvel Keith Harshman (October 4, 1917 – April 12, 2013) was an American college basketball coach. He served as a head coach for 41 years in the state of Washington at Pacific Lutheran University, Washington State University, and the University of Washington.

== Early years ==
Born in Eau Claire, Wisconsin, Harshman moved to the Pacific Northwest as a child and graduated from Lake Stevens High School in Lake Stevens, Washington, north of Seattle. He attended Pacific Lutheran University in Parkland, where he lettered thirteen times in football, basketball, baseball, and track and field and graduated in 1942. Harshman served three years in the U.S. Navy during World War II, then returned to PLU to coach. A fullback, he was selected by the Chicago Cardinals in the fifteenth round (134th overall) of the 1942 NFL draft.

== Collegiate career ==
While at his alma mater (1945–58), Harshman was also the head football coach from 1951 to 1957, compiling a 27–26–2 (.509) record, and also led the baseball team for the last five seasons. He moved east to Washington State University in Pullman in 1958 to succeed Jack Friel and coached the Cougars for 13 seasons. When Husky head coach Tex Winter left for the National Basketball Association (NBA) in 1971, Harshman moved across the state to the University of Washington in Seattle. He compiled a 637–444 (.589) overall record. Pressured by the university administration to step down, Harshman involuntarily retired from coaching at age 67 in 1985, following consecutive conference titles and NCAA tournament appearances.

== Honors ==
Harshman was named Pac-10 Coach of the Year (1982, 1984) and NABC Coach of the Year for Division I basketball (1984).

He was the coach of the gold-medal-winning U.S. team at the 1975 Pan American Games in Mexico City, and served on the U.S. Olympic Committee from 1975 to 1981. Harshman was enshrined into the Naismith Memorial Basketball Hall of Fame in April 1985 and was a member of the founding class of the National Collegiate Basketball Hall of Fame in 2006.

== Head coaching record ==
=== Basketball ===
Record table
Season	Team	Overall	Conference	Standing	Postseason
Pacific Lutheran Lutes (Independent) (1945–1949)
1945–46	Pacific Lutheran	6–14			
1946–47	Pacific Lutheran	8–13			
1947–48	Pacific Lutheran	17–15			
1948–49	Pacific Lutheran	25–7			
Pacific Lutheran Lutes (Evergreen Conference) (1949–1958)
1949–50	Pacific Lutheran	19–8	8–6	4th	
1950–51	Pacific Lutheran	20–11	10–4	T–2nd	
1951–52	Pacific Lutheran	16–10	7–5	3rd	
1952–53	Pacific Lutheran	16–10	8–4	T–2nd	
1953–54	Pacific Lutheran	18–10	8–4	2nd	
1954–55	Pacific Lutheran	17–6	10–2	T–1st	
1955–56	Pacific Lutheran	25–6	15–3	1st	
1956–57	Pacific Lutheran	28–1	12–0	1st	
1957–58	Pacific Lutheran	21–6	12–0	1st	
Pacific Lutheran:		236–117	90–28		
Washington State Cougars (Pacific Coast Conference) (1958–1969)
1958–59	Washington State	10–16	3–13	T–8th	
Washington State Cougars (NCAA independent) (1959–1963)
1959–60	Washington State	13–13			
1960–61	Washington State	10–16			
1961–62	Washington State	8–18			
1962–63	Washington State	5–20			
Washington State Cougars (AAWU / Pacific-8 Conference) (1963–1971)
1963–64	Washington State	5–21	2–13	6th	
1964–65	Washington State	9–17	6–8	5th	
1965–66	Washington State	15–11	6–8	T–4th	
1966–67	Washington State	15–11	8–6	2nd	
1967–68	Washington State	16–9	8–6	3rd	
1968–69	Washington State	18–8	11–3	2nd	
1969–70	Washington State	19–7	9–5	2nd	
1970–71	Washington State	12–14	2–14	T–8th	
Washington State:		155–181	55–76		
Washington Huskies (Pacific-8 / 10 Conference) (1971–1985)
1971–72	Washington	20–6	12–5	2nd	
1972–73	Washington	16–11	6–8	T–5th	
1973–74	Washington	16–10	7–7	4th	
1974–75	Washington	16–10	6–8	T–5th	
1975–76	Washington	23–5	9–5	3rd	NCAA Division I first round
1976–77	Washington	17–10	8–6	T–3rd	
1977–78	Washington	14–13	6–8	T–5th	
1978–79	Washington	11–16	6–12	T–8th	
1979–80	Washington	18–10	9–9	5th	NIT first round
1980–81	Washington	14–13	8–10	T–5th	
1981–82	Washington	19–10	11–7	4th	NIT second round
1982–83	Washington	16–15	7–11	T–6th	
1983–84	Washington	24–7	15–3	T–1st	NCAA Division I Sweet 16
1984–85	Washington	22–10	13–5	T–1st	NCAA Division I first round
Washington:		246–146	123–104		
Total:		637–444			
National champion Postseason invitational champion Conference regular season champion Conference regular season and conference tournament champion Division regular season champion Division regular season and conference tournament champion Conference tournament champion

=== Football ===
Year	Team	Overall	Conference	Standing	Bowl/playoffs
Pacific Lutheran (Evergreen Conference) (1951–1957)
1951	Pacific Lutheran	4–3	4–1	T–1st	
1952	Pacific Lutheran	5–3–1	5–0–1	1st	
1953	Pacific Lutheran	3–6	3–3	4th	
1954	Pacific Lutheran	5–3	4–2	3rd	
1955	Pacific Lutheran	5–3	5–1	2nd	
1956	Pacific Lutheran	3–3–1	3–3	T–3rd	
1957	Pacific Lutheran	2–6	1–5	6th	
Pacific Lutheran:		27–27–2	25–15–1		
Total:		48–13–1			
National championship Conference title Conference division title or championship game berth

== See also ==
- List of college men's basketball coaches with 600 wins
