= 1995 NCAA Division I men's basketball championship game =

Men's college basketball tournament game

1995 NCAA Tournament Championship Game
National championship game
Arkansas Razorbacks	UCLA Bruins
SEC	Pac-10
(32–6)	(31–1)
78	89
Head coach: Nolan Richardson	Head coach: Jim Harrick
- AP: 6
- Coaches: 6
- AP: 1
- Coaches: 1
	1st half	2nd half	Total
Arkansas Razorbacks	39	39	78
UCLA Bruins	40	49	89
- Date: April 3, 1995
- Venue: Kingdome, Seattle, Washington
- MVP: Ed O'Bannon, UCLA
- Favorite: UCLA by 3
- Attendance: 38,540

United States TV coverage
- Network: CBS
- Announcers: Jim Nantz (play-by-play); Billy Packer (color); Michele Tafoya (sideline)

The 1995 NCAA Division I men's basketball championship game was the finals of the 1995 NCAA Division I men's basketball tournament and it determined the national champion for the 1994-95 NCAA Division I men's basketball season The game was played on April 3, 1995, at the Kingdome in Seattle, Washington. The game featured the West Regional Champion, #1-seeded UCLA versus the Midwest Regional Champion and defending National Champion, #2-seeded Arkansas.

UCLA defeated Arkansas 89–78 to clinch their first national title since 1975, denying the Razorbacks a second consecutive title. As of 2026, this is the last time a team from California won the national championship.

Due to the NCAA's preference for holding the Final Four and title games in domed stadiums, these were the last such games to be played in a western state until 2017 which was held at University of Phoenix Stadium in Glendale, Arizona. It was also the last Final Four in Seattle, a city which had hosted the event 4 times previously. Additionally this was the last time for the foreseeable future that the Pacific Northwest hosted a Final Four or Regional Final after playing host to the aforementioned 4 in Seattle along with 1 in Portland.

== Participating teams ==
=== Arkansas Razorbacks ===
- Midwest
  - (2) Arkansas 79, (15) Texas Southern 78
  - (2) Arkansas 96, (7) Syracuse 94 (OT)
  - (2) Arkansas 96, (6) Memphis 91 (OT)
  - (2) Arkansas 68, (4) Virginia 61
- Final Four
  - (MW2) Arkansas 75, (SE2) North Carolina 68

=== UCLA Bruins ===
- Midwest
  - (1) UCLA 92, (16) Florida International 56
  - (1) UCLA 75, (8) Missouri 74
  - (1) UCLA 86, (5) Mississippi State 67
  - (1) UCLA 102, (2) Connecticut 96
- Final Four
  - (W1) UCLA 74, (E4) Oklahoma State 61

== Starting lineups ==
Arkansas	Position	UCLA
Clint McDaniel	G	Toby Bailey
Corey Beck	G	Tyus Edney
Corliss Williamson	F	† Ed O'Bannon
Scotty Thurman	F	Charles O'Bannon
Elmer Martin	C	George Zidek
† 1995 Consensus First Team All-American

== Game summary ==
External videos
- Full game broadcast by CBS on YouTube

CBS

Monday, April 3
8:40 pm

Box score

#W1 UCLA Bruins 89, #MW2 Arkansas Razorbacks 78
Pts: Ed O'Bannon 30; Rebs: Ed O'Bannon 17; Asts: Cameron Dollar 8	Pts: Clint McDaniel 16; Rebs: Dwight Stewart 5 Asts: Corliss Williamson 6 Halftime Score: UCLA, 40-39

Kingdome - Seattle, Washington
Attendance: 38,540

== Game notes ==
- Ed O'Bannon scored 30 points and grabbed 17 rebounds and is named the tournament's Most Outstanding Player as the Bruins win the championship 89–78 over Arkansas.
- Cameron Dollar played 36 minutes and contributed eight assists and four steals while filling in for an injured Edney, who did not return after leaving with 17:23 left in the first half.
- The Bruins enjoyed the biggest lead 34–26 in the first half, but led only by a point at halftime 40–39.
