= 1993–94 Arkansas Razorbacks men's basketball team =

American college basketball season

1993–94 Arkansas Razorbacks men's basketball

NCAA tournament National Champions NCAA tournament Midwest Regional champions Coaches Poll regular season champions SEC regular season champions SEC West Division champions

National Championship Game, W 76–72 vs. Duke
- Conference: Southeastern Conference
- West

Ranking
- Coaches: No. 1
- AP: No. 2
- Record: 31–3 (14–2 SEC)
- Head coach: Nolan Richardson (9th season)
- Assistant coaches: Nolan Richardson III; Mike Anderson (9th season); Brad Dunn
- Home arena: Bud Walton Arena

1993–94 Southeastern Conference men's basketball standings
	Conf.				Overall
Team	W		L	PCT	W		L	PCT
East
No. 14 Florida	12	–	4	.750	29	–	8	.784
No. 7 Kentucky †	12	–	4	.750	27	–	7	.794
Vanderbilt	9	–	7	.563	20	–	12	.625
Georgia	7	–	9	.438	14	–	16	.467
South Carolina	4	–	12	.250	9	–	19	.321
Tennessee	2	–	14	.125	5	–	22	.185
West
No. 2 Arkansas	14	–	2	.875	31	–	3	.912
Alabama	12	–	4	.750	20	–	10	.667
Mississippi State	9	–	7	.563	18	–	11	.621
Ole Miss	7	–	9	.438	14	–	13	.519
LSU	5	–	11	.313	11	–	16	.407
Auburn	3	–	13	.188	11	–	17	.393
† 1994 SEC tournament winner Rankings from AP Poll

The 1993–94 Arkansas Razorbacks men's basketball team represented the University of Arkansas in the 1993–94 NCAA Division I men's basketball season. It was Nolan Richardson's ninth season as head coach at Arkansas. The Razorbacks played their home games at Bud Walton Arena in Fayetteville, Arkansas as members of the West Division of the Southeastern Conference. Arkansas finished the season 31–3, 14–2 in SEC play to win the West Division and regular season overall championships. The Hogs defeated Georgia in the quarterfinals of the SEC tournament before losing to Kentucky in the semifinals. The Razorbacks received an at-large bid to the NCAA tournament as the 1 seed in the Midwest Regional, their seventh straight trip to the tournament. Arkansas defeated North Carolina A&T and Georgetown to advance to the Sweet Sixteen for the fourth time in five years. There the Razorbacks defeated Tulsa and Michigan to earn a trip to the Final Four. It was Arkansas's fifth trip to the Final Four in program history. In the Final Four, they defeated Arizona before beating Duke in the National Championship game. Thanks to Scotty Thurman's high arching three-point shot with less than a minute to play in the national championship game, the team earned its first national championship in school history. Thurman's shot is known as the "Shot heard 'round Arkansas", and is considered one of the greatest plays in Arkansas Razorbacks sports history. Corliss Williamson was named the Most Outstanding Player of the tournament. 1993–94 is considered the greatest single season in Arkansas' one-hundred-year history of men's basketball.

== Previous season ==
The Razorbacks finished the 1992–93 season 22–9, 10–6 in SEC play to win the SEC West Division championship. Arkansas defeated Georgia before losing in the semifinals of the SEC tournament to Kentucky. The Razorbacks received an at-large bid to the NCAA tournament as the 4 seed in the East Regional. Arkansas defeated Holy Cross and St. John's to advance to the Sweet Sixteen for the third time in four years. There they lost to 4th-ranked and eventual national champion North Carolina. This team was dubbed "Richardson's Runts", due to the fact that Dwight Stewart was the tallest player on the team at 6'9".

== Roster ==
1993–94 Arkansas Razorbacks men's basketball team
Players
Coaches

Pos.	#	Name	Height	Weight	Year	Hometown
G	3	Alex Dillard	6 ft 1 in (1.85 m)	175 lb (79 kg)	Jr	Bessemer, AL
G	12	Clint McDaniel	6 ft 4 in (1.93 m)	190 lb (86 kg)	Jr	Tulsa, OK
G	13	John Engskov	6 ft 3 in (1.91 m)	180 lb (82 kg)	Fr	Berryville, AR
G	14	Corey Beck	6 ft 2 in (1.88 m)	210 lb (95 kg)	Jr	Memphis, TN
C	15	Dwight Stewart	6 ft 9 in (2.06 m)	270 lb (122 kg)	Jr	Memphis, TN
G	22	Davor Rimac	6 ft 7 in (2.01 m)	205 lb (93 kg)	Jr	Zagreb, Croatia
F	23	Ken Biley	6 ft 6 in (1.98 m)	210 lb (95 kg)	Sr	Pine Bluff, AR
F	24	Ray Biggers	6 ft 8 in (2.03 m)	215 lb (98 kg)	Jr	Houston, TX
F	30	Scotty Thurman	6 ft 6 in (1.98 m)	195 lb (88 kg)	So	Ruston, LA
G	31	Roger Crawford	6 ft 4 in (1.93 m)	185 lb (84 kg)	Sr	Birmingham, AL
C	33	Lee Wilson	6 ft 11 in (2.11 m)	235 lb (107 kg)	Fr	Waco, TX
F	34	Corliss Williamson	6 ft 7 in (2.01 m)	245 lb (111 kg)	So	Russellville, AR
G	35	Reggie Merritt	6 ft 1 in (1.85 m)	170 lb (77 kg)	So	Little Rock, AR
F	40	Elmer Martin	6 ft 8 in (2.03 m)	225 lb (102 kg)	Jr	Memphis, TN
C	44	Darnell Robinson	6 ft 11 in (2.11 m)	245 lb (111 kg)	Fr	Oakland, CA

Head coach

- Nolan Richardson (UTEP)

Assistant coach(es)

- Mike Anderson (Tulsa)
- Nolan Richardson III (Langston)
- Brad Dunn

Legend

- (C) Team captain
- (S) Suspended
- (I) Ineligible
- (W) Walk-on
- Injured
- Current redshirt

Roster

== Schedule and results ==
Date time, TV	Rank^{#}	Opponent^{#}	Result	Record	High points	High rebounds	High assists	Site (attendance) city, state
Regular season
November 29*; 7:05 p.m.	No. 2	Murray State	W 93–67	1–0	13 – Tied	7 – Robinson	6 – Beck	Bud Walton Arena (20,048); Fayetteville, AR
December 2*; 8:30 p.m., ESPN	No. 2	Missouri	W 120–68	2–0	18 – Thurman	8 – Robinson	5 – Beck	Bud Walton Arena (20,212); Fayetteville, AR
December 4*; 7:05 p.m., Learfield Sports	No. 2	Northwestern State	W 111–76	3–0	21 – Dillard	12 – Williamson	7 – Crawford	Bud Walton Arena (19,886); Fayetteville, AR
December 8*; 8:30 p.m., ESPN	No. 1	at Memphis	W 96–78	4–0	18 – Williamson	7 – Wilson	5 – Beck	Pyramid Arena (20,142); Memphis, TN
December 11*; 7:05 p.m., Learfield Sports	No. 1	Delaware State	W 123–66	5–0	39 – Dillard	9 – Robinson	5 – Crawford	Bud Walton Arena (20,184); Fayetteville, AR
December 18*; 7:05 p.m., Learfield Sports	No. 1	Jackson State	W 96–80	6–0	25 – Williamson	12 – Stewart	5 – Beck	Bud Walton Arena (20,084); Fayetteville, AR
December 23*; 7:05 p.m., Learfield Sports	No. 1	at Tulsa	W 93–91 ^{OT}	7–0	27 – Williamson	9 – Williamson	5 – McDaniel	Tulsa Convention Center (8,659); Tulsa, OK
December 28*; 7:05 p.m., Learfield Sports	No. 1	Texas Southern	W 129–63	8–0	18 – Rimac	9 – Stewart	9 – Beck	Bud Walton Arena (20,098); Fayetteville, AR
January 3*; 7:05 p.m.	No. 1	SMU	W 96–70	9–0	23 – Dillard	8 – Thurman	7 – Thurman	Bud Walton Arena (20,008); Fayetteville, AR
January 5; 7:00 p.m., JP Sports	No. 1	Ole Miss	W 87–61	10–0 (1–0)	25 – Williamson	10 – Williamson	5 – Beck	Bud Walton Arena (20,096); Fayetteville, AR
January 8; 1:30 p.m.	No. 1	at Alabama	L 64–66	10–1 (1–1)	14 – Beck	8 – Williamson	2 – Tied	Coleman Coliseum (15,043); Tuscaloosa, AL
January 11; 8:30 p.m., ESPN	No. 4	LSU	W 84–83	11–1 (2–1)	24 – Williamson	8 – Williamson	8 – Beck	Bud Walton Arena (20,208); Fayetteville, AR
January 15; 1:30 p.m.	No. 4	at Auburn	W 117–105	12–1 (3–1)	32 – Thurman	11 – Williamson	4 – Tied	Beard-Eaves Memorial Coliseum (11,236); Auburn, AL
January 19; 7:30 p.m.	No. 3	at Mississippi State	L 71–72	12–2 (3–2)	26 – Williamson	6 – Beck	3 – Tied	Humphrey Coliseum (9,711); Starkville, MS
January 22; 1:00 p.m., JP Sports	No. 3	South Carolina	W 79–53	13–2 (4–2)	27 – Williamson	9 – Stewart	7 – Beck	Bud Walton Arena (20,118); Fayetteville, AR
January 29; 3:00 p.m.	No. 5	at Tennessee	W 65–64	14–2 (5–2)	15 – Beck	9 – Tied	5 – Beck	Thompson-Boling Arena (14,275); Knoxville, TN
February 1; 8:30 p.m., ESPN	No. 6	Vanderbilt	W 89–76	15–2 (6–2)	24 – Williamson	8 – Thurman	9 – Beck	Bud Walton Arena (20,246); Fayetteville, AR
February 5*; 7:05 p.m.	No. 6	Montevallo	W 131–63	16–2	21 – Thurman	9 – Biley	7 – Tied	Bud Walton Arena (20,034); Fayetteville, AR
February 9; 7:00 p.m., JP Sports, ESPN2	No. 3	at No. 4 Kentucky	W 90–82	17–2 (8–2)	26 – Thurman	14 – Williamson	9 – Beck	Rupp Arena (24,236); Lexington, KY
February 12; 1:00 p.m., JP Sports	No. 3	No. 20 Florida	W 99–87	18–2 (9–2)	24 – Thurman	7 – Stewart	3 – Tied	Bud Walton Arena (20,230); Fayetteville, AR
February 16; 7:00 p.m., JP Sports	No. 1	Alabama	W 102–81	19–2 (10–2)	20 – Williamson	6 – Stewart	5 – Thurman	Bud Walton Arena (20,262); Fayetteville, AR
February 19; 7:35 p.m.	No. 1	vs. Ole Miss	W 90–73	20–2 (11–2)	21 – Williamson	9 – Wilson	5 – Tied	The Pyramid (20,142); Memphis, TN
February 22; 8:30 p.m., ESPN	No. 1	at Georgia	W 74–65	21–2 (12–2)	25 – Thurman	8 – Tied	3 – Beck	Stegeman Coliseum (8,458); Athens, GA
February 26; 7:05 p.m.	No. 1	Auburn	W 91–81	22–2 (12–2)	21 – Thurman	11 – Williamson	4 – Robinson	Bud Walton Arena (20,208); Fayetteville, AR
March 2; 7:00 p.m., JP Sports	No. 1	at LSU	W 108–105 ^{OT}	23–2 (13–2)	27 – Thurman	9 – Beck	8 – Beck	Maravich Assembly Center (11,712); Baton Rouge, LA
March 5; 3:00 p.m., JP Sports	No. 1	Mississippi State	W 80–62	24–2 (14–2)	27 – Williamson	9 – Williamson	4 – Tied	Bud Walton Arena (20,224); Fayetteville, AR
SEC Tournament
March 11*; 2:15 p.m., JP Sports	(W1) No. 1	vs. (E4) Georgia; Quarterfinal	W 95–83	25–2	30 – Williamson	8 – Williamson	6 – Beck	Pyramid Arena (20,218); Memphis, TN
March 12*; 2:30 p.m., JP Sports	(W1) No. 1	vs. (E2) No. 10 Kentucky; Semifinal	L 78–90	25–3	23 – Williamson	16 – Williamson	3 – Tied	Pyramid Arena (20,431); Memphis, TN
NCAA tournament
March 18*; 9:38 p.m., CBS	(MW1) No. 2	vs. (MW16) North Carolina A&T; First Round	W 94–79	26–3	24 – Williamson	7 – Williamson	9 – Thurman	Myriad Convention Center (13,366); Oklahoma City, OK
March 20*; 3:55 p.m., CBS	(MW1) No. 2	vs. (MW9) Georgetown; Second Round	W 85–73	27–3	21 – Williamson	8 – Beck	5 – Williason	Myriad Convention Center (13,376); Oklahoma City, OK
March 25*; 7:02 p.m., CBS	(MW1) No. 2	vs. (MW12) Tulsa; Sweet Sixteen	W 103–84	28–3	21 – Tied	9 – Williamson	8 – Wilson	Reunion Arena (16,297); Dallas, TX
March 27*; 3:00 p.m., CBS	(MW1) No. 2	vs. (MW3) No. 11 Michigan; Elite Eight	W 76–68	29–3	20 – Thurman	7 – McDaniel	5 – Beck	Reunion Arena (16,297); Dallas, TX
April 2*; 4:42 p.m., CBS	(MW1) No. 2	vs. (W2) No. 9 Arizona; Final Four	W 91–82	30–3	29 – Williamson	14 – Williamson	5 – Tied	Charlotte Coliseum (23,674); Charlotte, NC
April 4*; 8:22 p.m., CBS	(MW1) No. 2	vs. (SE2) No. 6 Duke; National Championship	W 76–72	31–3	23 – Williamson	10 – Beck	4 – Tied	Charlotte Coliseum (23,674); Charlotte, NC
*Non-conference game. ^{#}Rankings from AP Poll. (#) Tournament seedings in parentheses.

== Awards and honors ==
- Nolan Richardson, Naismith College Coach of the Year
- Nolan Richardson, SEC Men's Basketball Coach of the Year
- Corliss Williamson, NCAA Men's MOP Award
- Corliss Williamson, Second Team, 1994 NCAA Men's Basketball All-Americans
- Corliss Williamson, SEC Men's Basketball Player of the Year
- Corliss Williamson, 1st team All-SEC
- Scotty Thurman, Honorable Mention, 1994 NCAA Men's Basketball All-Americans
- Scotty Thurman, 1st team All-SEC

== Player statistics ==
Player	G	GS	MP	FG	FGA	FG%	2P	2PA	2P%	3P	3PA	3P%	FT	FTA	FT%	ORB	DRB	TRB	AST	STL	BLK	TOV	PF	PTS
Williamson	34	34	989																					
Thurman	34	34	987																					
Dillard	34	0	421																					
Beck	34	34	876																					
Stewart	34	27	724																					
McDaniel	31	13	669																					
Crawford	30	4	536																					
Robinson	27	6	479																					
Rimac	34	12	406																					
Wilson	30	1	287																					
Biley	18	2	94																					
Martin	27	0	160																					
Engskov	9	0	23																					
Biggers	18	3	178																					
Merritt	9	0	21																					
School Totals	34																							

== Team players drafted into the NBA ==
Year	Round	Pick	Player	NBA Team
1995	1	13	Corliss Williamson	Sacramento Kings
1996	2	58	Darnell Robinson	Dallas Mavericks

- Corey Beck and Clint McDaniel played in the NBA as undrafted free agents.
