= 1994 NCAA Division I men's basketball championship game =

American college basketball game

1994 NCAA Tournament Championship Game
National championship game
Duke Blue Devils	Arkansas Razorbacks
ACC	SEC
(28–5)	(30–3)
72	76
Head coach: Mike Krzyzewski	Head coach: Nolan Richardson
- AP: 6
- Coaches: 6
- AP: 2
- Coaches: 1
	1st half	2nd half	Total
Duke Blue Devils	33	39	72
Arkansas Razorbacks	34	42	76
- Date: April 4, 1994
- Venue: Charlotte Coliseum, Charlotte, North Carolina
- MVP: Corliss Williamson, Arkansas
- Favorite: Arkansas by 5

United States TV coverage
- Network: CBS
- Announcers: Jim Nantz (play-by-play); Billy Packer (color)

The 1994 NCAA Division I men's basketball championship game was the final game of the 1994 NCAA Division I men's basketball tournament. It determined the national champion for the 1993–94 NCAA Division I men's basketball season and was contested by the Duke Blue Devils from the Atlantic Coast Conference (ACC) and the Arkansas Razorbacks from the Southeastern Conference (SEC). The game was played on April 4, 1994, at Charlotte Coliseum in Charlotte, North Carolina.

Arkansas defeated Duke 76–72 to win their first national championship in program history, denying the ACC a fourth straight title.

== Participants ==
=== Duke Blue Devils ===
The Duke Blue Devils represented Duke University in Durham, North Carolina, and were led by head coach Mike Krzyzewski in his fourteenth season. They were ranked No. 4 in the preseason AP Poll and No. 3 in the preseason Coaches Poll.

- Southeast
  - (2) Duke 82, (15) Texas Southern 70
  - (2) Duke 85, (7) Michigan State 74
  - (2) Duke 59, (6) Marquette 49
  - (2) Duke 69, (1) Purdue 60
- Final Four
  - (SE2) Duke 70, (E3) Florida 65

=== Arkansas Razorbacks ===
The Arkansas Razorbacks, representing the University of Arkansas in Fayetteville, Arkansas, were led by head coach Nolan Richardson in his ninth season. The team entered the season ranked No. 3 in the preseason AP Poll and No. 3 in the preseason Coaches Poll.

- Midwest
  - (1) Arkansas 94, (16) North Carolina A&T 79
  - (1) Arkansas 85, (9) Georgetown 73
  - (1) Arkansas 103, (12) Tulsa 84
  - (1) Arkansas 76, (3) Michigan 68
- Final Four
  - (MW1) Arkansas 91, (W2) Arizona 82

== Starting lineups ==
Duke	Position	Arkansas
Jeff Capel	G	Scotty Thurman
Chris Collins	G	Corey Beck
† Grant Hill	F	Ken Biley
Antonio Lang	F	Corliss Williamson
Cherokee Parks	C	Dwight Stewart
† 1994 Consensus First Team All-American

== Game summary ==
CBS

April 4, 1994

#SE2 Duke Blue Devils 72, #MW1 Arkansas Razorbacks 76
Scoring by half: 33-34, 39-42
Pts: Antonio Lang 15; Rebs: Grant Hill 14; Asts: Grant Hill 6	Pts: Corliss Williamson 23; Rebs: Corey Beck 10; Asts: Dwight Stewart, Corey Beck 4

Charlotte Coliseum, Charlotte, North Carolina

Duke's Grant Hill made a 3-pointer to tie the game at 70 with 1:30 left. After an Arkansas timeout, Scotty Thurman hit a 3-pointer over Antonio Lang as the 35-second shot clock expired, giving the Razorbacks a 73–70 lead with 50.7 seconds remaining. Chris Collins missed a 3 that would have tied the score. Clint McDaniel rebounded for Arkansas and was fouled with 28.4 seconds left. He made one of two free throws to put Arkansas up by four, 74–70. Collins missed a floater in the lane. Corey Beck rebounded and was fouled. Beck missed the first free throw and made the second for a 75–70 Razorbacks lead with 17.2 seconds left. Jeff Capel's 3-point attempt missed, but Cherokee Parks got the offensive rebound and scored on the putback to bring the Blue Devils within three, 75–72, with 10.2 seconds left. McDaniel was fouled with 9 seconds left, and he hit one of two free throws to seal the national championship for Arkansas with a 76–72 victory over Duke.
