= Arkansas Razorbacks men's basketball =

NCAA Division I men's basketball team

2026–27 Arkansas Razorbacks men's basketball team
- University: University of Arkansas
- First season: 1923–24; 103 years ago
- Athletic director: Hunter Yurachek
- Head coach: John Calipari; 3rd season, 50–23 (.685)
- Location: Fayetteville, Arkansas
- Arena: Bud Walton Arena (capacity: 19,200)
- NCAA division: Division I
- Conference: SEC
- Nickname: Razorbacks
- Colors: Cardinal and white
- Student section: The Trough
- All-time record: 1,849–1,037 (.641)
- NCAA tournament record: 54–37 (.593)

NCAA Division I tournament champions
- 1994
Other NCAA Division I tournament results
Runner-up	1995
Final Four	1941, 1945, 1978, 1990, 1994, 1995
Elite Eight	1941, 1945, 1949, 1978, 1979, 1990, 1991, 1994, 1995, 2021, 2022
Sweet Sixteen	1958, 1978, 1979, 1981, 1983, 1990, 1991, 1993, 1994, 1995, 1996, 2021, 2022, 2023, 2025, 2026
Appearances	1941, 1945, 1949, 1958, 1977, 1978, 1979, 1980, 1981, 1982, 1983, 1984, 1985, 1988, 1989, 1990, 1991, 1992, 1993, 1994, 1995, 1996, 1998, 1999, 2000, 2001, 2006, 2007, 2008, 2015, 2017, 2018, 2021, 2022, 2023, 2025, 2026

Conference tournament champions
- SWC: 1977, 1979, 1982, 1989, 1990, 1991 SEC: 2000, 2026

Conference regular-season champions
- SWC: 1926, 1927, 1928, 1929, 1930, 1935, 1936, 1938, 1941, 1942, 1944, 1949, 1950, 1958, 1977, 1978, 1979, 1981, 1982, 1989, 1990, 1991 SEC: 1992, 1994

Conference division champions
- SEC West: 1992, 1993, 1994, 1995

Uniforms
Home	Away

The Arkansas Razorbacks men's basketball team, colloquially known as the Hogs, represents the University of Arkansas in Fayetteville, Arkansas in NCAA Division I men's basketball competition. The team competes in the Southeastern Conference and is coached by John Calipari. Arkansas plays its home games in Bud Walton Arena on the University of Arkansas campus. The Razorbacks are a top-twenty-five program all-time by winning percentage (.641), top-twenty program by NCAA tournament games played, top-twenty program by NCAA Tournament games won, top-fifteen program by Final Four appearances, and despite playing significantly fewer seasons than most programs in major conferences, top-thirty by all-time wins. Under the coaching leadership of Nolan Richardson, the Hogs won the national championship in 1994, defeating Duke, and appeared in the championship game the following year, finishing as runner-up to UCLA. The Razorbacks have made six NCAA Final Four appearances (1941, 1945, 1978, 1990, 1994, and 1995).

== History ==
=== Early success under Schmidt (1923–29) ===
Arkansas had a relatively late start in basketball; it did not field its first team until 1923. Francis Schmidt coached the Razorbacks from the 1923–24 season until the 1928–29 season, while also coaching the football and baseball teams.

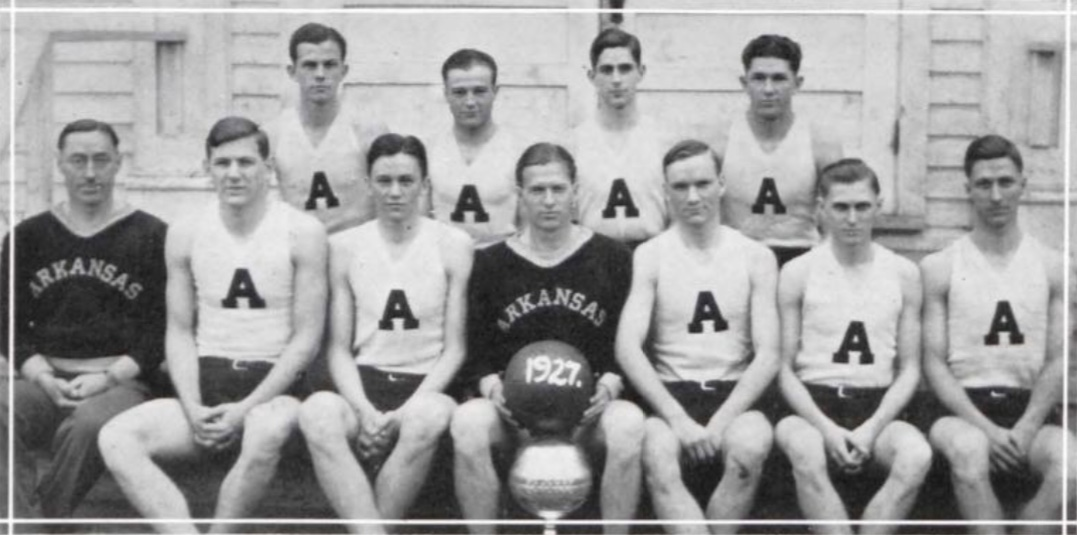
The 1926–27 Razorbacks

Schmidt oversaw the construction of the gymnasium that was home to the Razorbacks from the inaugural season through the 1936–37 season. The project was headed by Schmidt and Jay Fulbright (father of future United States Senator from Arkansas, J. William Fulbright). Schmidt and Fulbright organized a group of businessmen that facilitated the transfer of a former car showroom to the university to serve as the gym for the Razorbacks. The wooden gym, made out of surplus World War I material and officially named Schmidt Gymnasium, became known as "Schmidt's barn," in reference to its makeshift nature and lack of accommodations.

After a difficult first year that resulted in a 17–11 overall record and a 3–9 conference record, Schmidt quickly led the Hogs to success and a dominating run in the Southwest Conference during his tenure. Building off the program's first season, the 1924–25 team finished third in the conference, quickly turning their record around to 9–3 in conference play. This second season laid the groundwork for tremendous success with Schmidt, as the Razorbacks won the conference championship outright in just the third year of the program's existence with a record of 23–2 (11–1). The 1925–26 season kicked off a string of four straight Southwest Conference championships under Schmidt, and five straight overall. Schmidt also coached the Hogs to the first of three perfect SWC seasons in program history in 1927–28, with a conference record of 12–0 and a 15.25-point average margin of victory in conference play. The 1927–28 season also marked the beginning of a school record 31-game winning streak that ran until the last few games of the next season. Schmidt's last four teams at Arkansas went a combined 75–6 (42–4).

The last couple years of Schmidt's dominant SWC run were marked by serious star power, with future Razorback basketball coaches Eugene Lambert Sr. and Glen Rose earning First-Team Helms Athletic Foundation All-American recognition during Schmidt's last two seasons (1928–29 and 1927–28, respectively), along with Tom Pickel earning First-Team honors from College Humor Magazine in Schmidt's final season as coach. Schmidt's Razorbacks had four of the five All-SWC selections in 1928 (Rose, Pickel, Lambert, and Wear Schoonover). During Schmidt's time at Arkansas, the Razorbacks finished first in the SWC four out of six years, and compiled an overall record of 113–22 (.837), the highest winning percentage of any Arkansas coach ever. Schmidt left Arkansas to take the football and basketball jobs at TCU, where he was coach until 1934.

=== Bassett years (1929–33) ===
In the 1929–30 season, Charles Bassett took over as head coach, leaving the head coaching job at Texas A&M that he held for two years without finding much success, going a paltry 16–18 (5–15) in his two years as head coach in College Station, including a last-place finish in conference play for the 1927–28 Southwest Conference season. Arkansas's success under Bassett was limited to his first season as coach, when the Hogs won the Southwest Conference Championship with multi-sport star and current College Football Hall of Fame member Wear Schoonover garnering Second-Team All-American recognition from College Humor and earning First-Team All-SWC honors for the third straight season. The Razorbacks did not finish above third place in the Southwest Conference standings for the rest of Bassett's tenure. Aside from the SWC Championship in 1930, the other major bright spot in Bassett's tenure came on January 8, 1931, when the Razorbacks defeated rival Texas, 29–21, the day UT dedicated its new gym. Bassett's last season was the 1932–33 season, when the Razorbacks went 14–7 overall with a 6–6 conference record, the first time since the inaugural 1923–24 season that the Hogs did not finish the year with a winning record in conference play. After four seasons, Bassett's overall record was 62–29 (.681).

=== First Glen Rose era (1933–42) ===
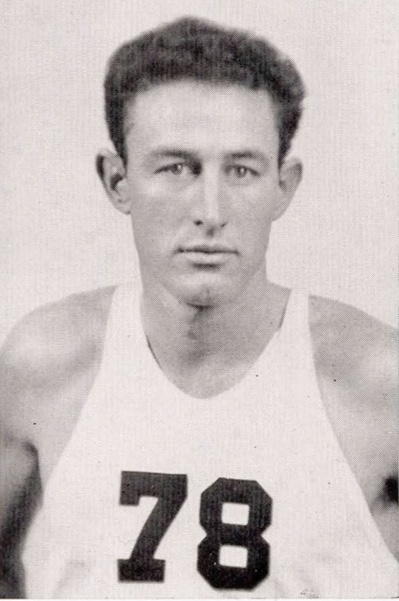
John Adams was an All-American in 1941 and one of the first players to use the jump shot.

Glen Rose took over in the 1933–34 season and returned the program to a competitive position within the SWC. Named a Helms Athletic Foundation First-Team All-American as a Hog in 1928, Rose was the first former player to coach the Razorbacks. Rebuilding the program after the decline under Bassett, Rose's first season as coach produced a .500 conference record (6–6) and a tie for third place in the final SWC standings. The Hogs finished with a winning conference record and no lower than second place in the conference standings for the rest of Rose's first stint with Arkansas, save for one season.

The 1935–36 season ended with the Hogs competing for the right to represent the United States in the 1936 Olympic Games in Berlin for the first year of basketball being an official medal sport. The Razorbacks swept the other NCAA teams they played in the NCAA Olympic Playoffs, but lost in the first round of the U.S. Olympic Trials to the Universal Pictures Amateur Athletic Union team that went on to win the gold medal.

The following season, 1936–37 featured the last game in Schmidt Gymnasium, or "Schmidt's barn." Construction of the new building, (originally known as the Field House) that came to be known as the Men's Gymnasium was under way in 1936, and was completed in the fall semester of 1937, with a capacity of 2,500. The new home for the Razorbacks was dedicated on February 4, 1938, in a 53–26 win over TCU. The Men's Gymnasium served as home for the basketball team until Barnhill Arena was completed in 1954 and the Razorbacks began playing games there in the 1955–56 season.

The Razorbacks won the Southwest Conference outright three times and tied for first two more times during this nine-year run. In the 1940–41 season, Rose led Arkansas to its second perfect conference record ever (12–0) en route the NCAA Final Four in the Razorbacks' first NCAA Tournament appearance. The 1940–41 season is also notable for the outstanding play of John "Johnny" Adams, a Helms First-Team All-American who is credited as being one of the players responsible for the proliferation of the jump shot in basketball. Adams set the single-game SWC scoring record that season with 36 points against TCU in Fort Worth on February 21, 1941. Rose finished this nine-year run with a record of 154–47 (.766). Rose went on to coach the football team for the 1944 and 1945 seasons, without much success. Rose returned to coach the basketball team a decade after he left.

=== Eugene Lambert (1942–49) ===
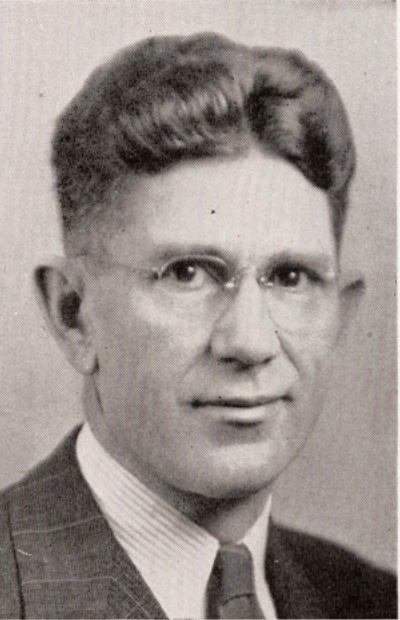
Eugene Lambert circa 1947.

Former Razorback and All-American Eugene Lambert took the coaching job starting in the 1942–43 season. Lambert found moderate success in his first season as head coach, posting a winning record and overseeing a first in program history by coaching the first freshman to play for the Razorback varsity squad, Paul Coleman. After winning a share of the Southwest Conference Championship for the 1943–44 season, Lambert and Arkansas were selected for the NCAA tournament for the second time in program history. However, the team was forced to withdraw after tragedy struck when a car accident injured two of their starters, Ben Jones and Deno Nichols, and killed Eugene Norris, a physical education teacher that accompanied the players on their trip. The next year the Hogs earned another tournament berth and advanced to the Final Four, losing to eventual champions Oklahoma A&M. The Razorbacks did not make the tournament again until the 1948–49 season, when the Hogs shared the SWC crown with Baylor and Rice. The Hogs lost in the first round of the regional, but won the third place game. The 1948–49 season was Lambert's last season coaching the Hogs. During Lambert's seven seasons, Arkansas won a share the Southwest Conference Championship twice, with three second-place finishes and never fell lower than third in the conference. Lambert's final record was 113–60 (.653).

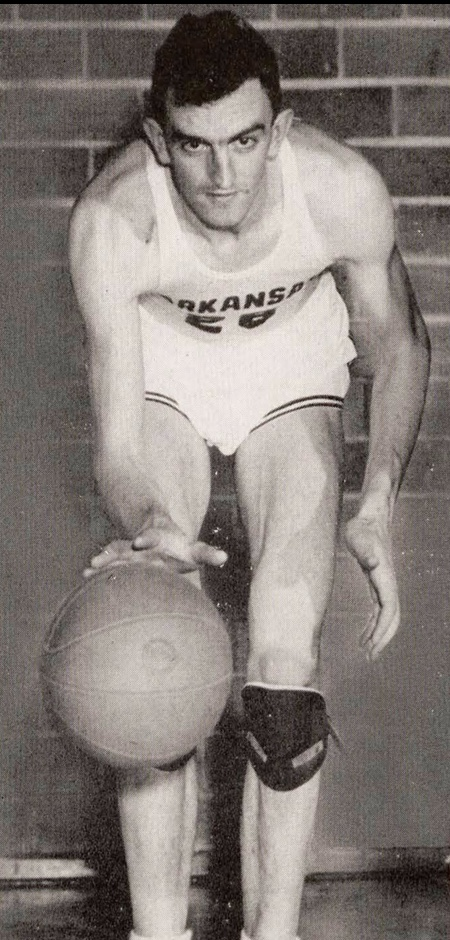
George Kok was an All-American in 1948.

=== Presley Askew (1949–52) ===
Presley Askew took over for the 1949–50 season and coached through the 1951–52 season. Arkansas tied for first place in the Southwest Conference in Askew's first season, but bottomed out in his third and final season, posting the program's first losing record of 10–14 (4–8). The Razorbacks did not make the NCAA Tournament during Askew's tenure. Askew's overall record was 35–37 (.486), the first basketball coach to finish his career at Arkansas with a losing record, despite having a winning conference record of 19–17. As of 2025, Askew's three-season tenure is the shortest in Razorback basketball history of non-interim head coaches that coached at least one game.

=== Second Glen Rose era (1952–66) ===
Glen Rose returned for the 1952–53 season; his second stint with the Hogs lasted until 1966. Rose did not reach the heights of his previous run, with the only real success being in the 1957–58 season, when Arkansas tied for first place in the Southwest Conference with SMU and made the NCAA tournament, losing to an Oklahoma State team whose starting point guard, Eddie Sutton, eventually became head coach of the Razorbacks. Rose's teams in his second spell as head coach posted a winning conference record only five times, to go along with six losing records overall.

For the second time in his career as head coach, Rose oversaw a transition from one home court to another. Eighteen years after the transition from "Schmidt's barn" to the Men's Gymnasium, the Razorbacks began playing their home games in Barnhill Arena (then known as Razorback Fieldhouse) in the 1955–56 season. With a capacity of 3,500 at the time of the first game, the transition to Razorback Fieldhouse represented more investment and interest in the program, even if the results of Rose's second run with the Hogs were lackluster. The capacity of Razorback Fieldhouse was 5,000 once it was fully completed and remained at that number until 1977. Razorback Fieldhouse would also be the site of the first televised home game for the Hogs, with Rose coaching the Hogs to a 61–57 victory over Texas Tech on January 3, 1959.

Rose finished his second run with the Hogs (fourteen seasons) with a record of 171–154 (.526). Rose's overall record for his time at Arkansas (twenty-three seasons) was 325–201 (.618). Rose's twenty-three seasons as head coach remain the longest tenure of any Razorback basketball coach, and his fourteen continuous seasons as coach from 1952 to 1966 is second only to Nolan Richardson for longest continuous tenure as Razorback basketball coach.

=== Decline under Waller and Van Eman (1966–74) ===
After Glen Rose's teams continually failed to be competitive in the SWC during his second stint as coach, he retired following the 1965–66 season. The next eight years proved to be much worse than the lows experienced under Rose's leadership.

Duddy Waller became head coach for the 1966–67 season, but only lasted until the 1970–71 season. All of Waller's teams posted losing records, including two of the three worst winning percentages for a season in school history and the second most losses in a season in school history. Waller's record during his four seasons was 31–64, which is the worst overall winning percentage (.326) of any Arkansas basketball coach ever.

Waller was replaced by Lanny Van Eman, who coached the Hogs from the 1970–71 season through the 1973–74 season. Van Eman started his career as head coach of the Razorbacks with the worst season in school history, a 5–21 (1–13) campaign that still holds the record for most losses in a season, lowest winning percentage for a season, most SWC losses in a season, and fewest conference wins in a season. Despite such an awful first season, Van Eman did manage to lead Arkansas to its first winning conference record in a decade, when the Hogs finished with a 9–5 record in the SWC for the 1972–73 season and tied for second place in the conference. Van Eman finished his career at Arkansas with a 39–65 record (.375).

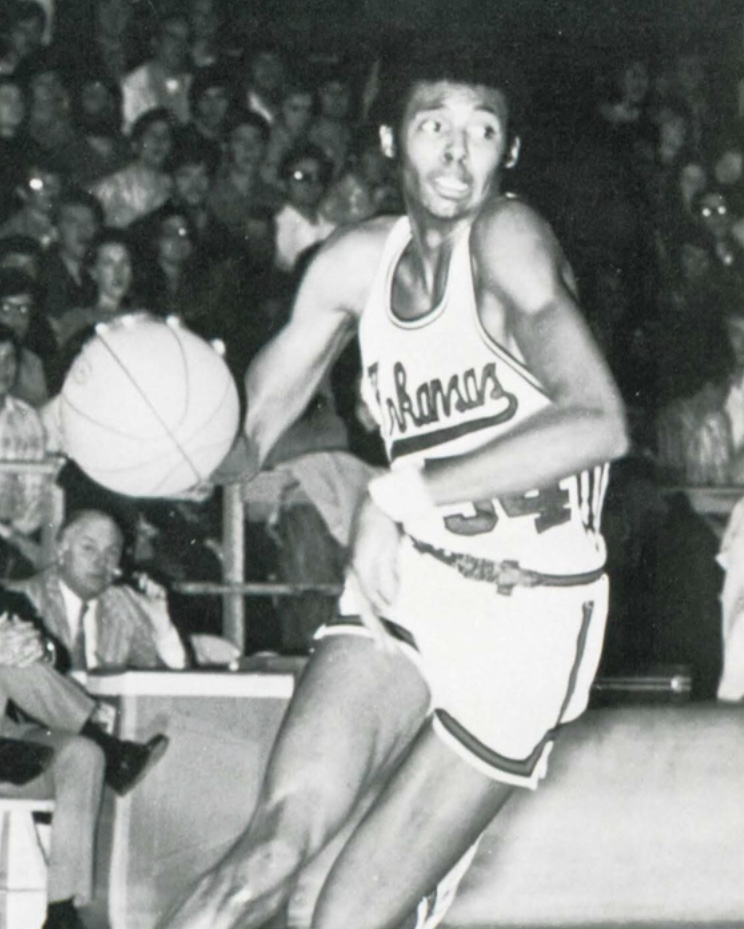
Dean Tolson as a sophomore

Despite the major shortcomings of Waller and Van Eman's teams on the court, of note is the fact that these coaches oversaw the gradual integration of African-American players into the basketball program under their leadership. Thomas A. Johnson was the first African-American to play for the Razorbacks on the 1967 team headed by Waller. Following in the footsteps of Johnson were the first African-American stars of Razorback basketball, guard Martin Terry and center Dean Tolson. Playing under Van Eman, Terry and Tolson put up huge numbers and set school records that still stand today, while also collecting All-SWC and All-American recognition. Terry owns the Arkansas records for highest season and career scoring averages, was a two-time First-Team All-SWC selection in 1972 and 1973, and picked up an All-American Honorable Mention nod from Helms in 1973, the same season he was named Southwest Conference Player of the Year. He was taken in the third round of the 1973 NBA draft, the second-highest pick in Arkansas history at the time. Tolson is the school record holder for single-game field goals made and attempted, as well as career rebounding average. Tolson would follow Terry and get drafted in the fifth round of the 1974 NBA draft.

Arkansas failed to finish above second place in the Southwest Conference during these eight seasons, posting a winning record only once, and did not receive any invitations to the NCAA Tournament. The combined overall record of these two coaches was 70–129 (.352) and 39–73 (.348) in conference play.

=== New heights in the Eddie Sutton era (1974–85) ===
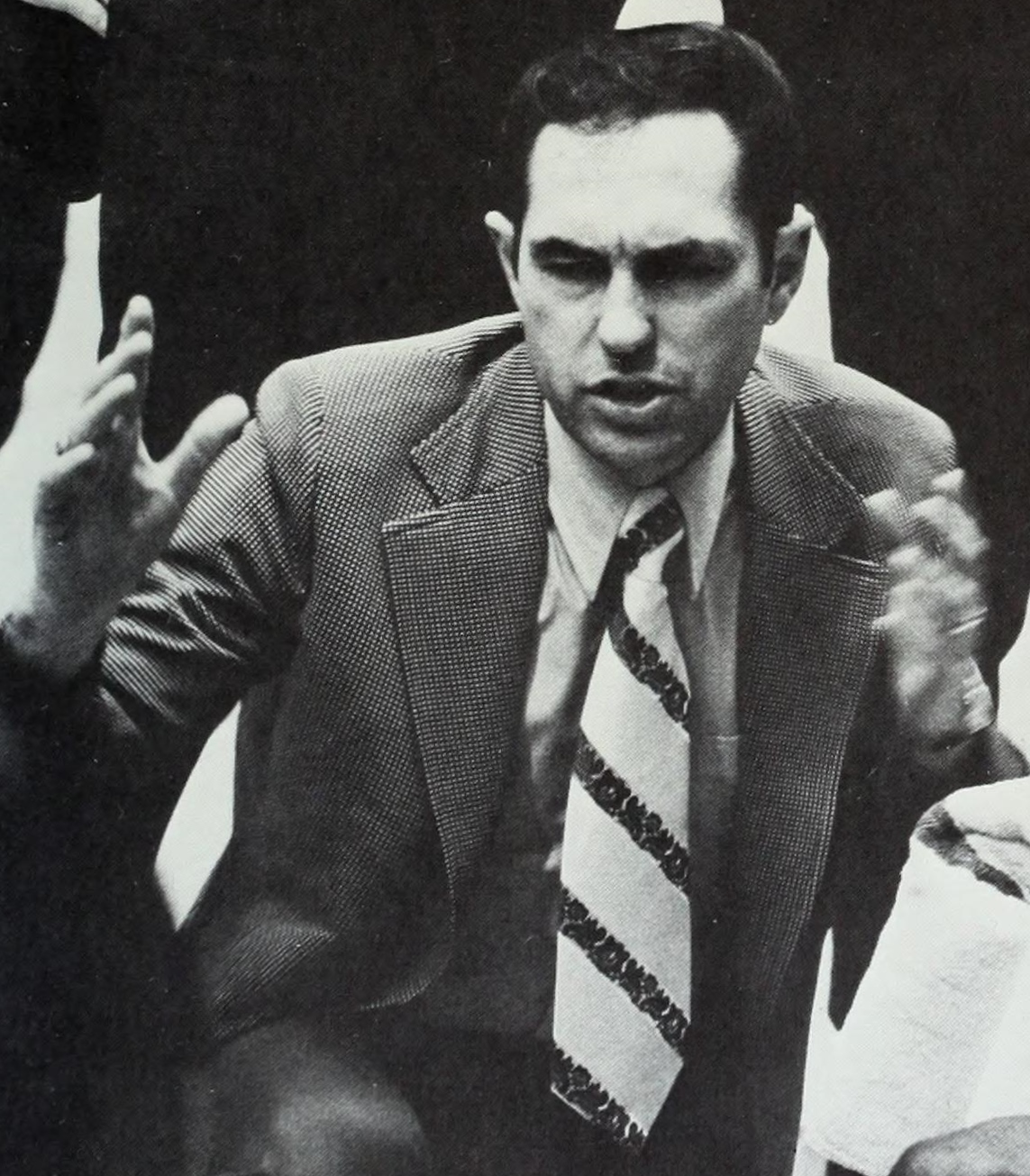
Head basketball coach, Eddie Sutton, instructs his team during a game.

After coaching at Creighton for five mostly unremarkable seasons that culminated in an NCAA Tournament bid and a first round victory, Eddie Sutton found himself on Frank Broyles's radar, as the longtime head football coach and new athletic director wanted to invest in the basketball program to get it out of the depths of the Waller and Van Eman years.

Broyles hired Sutton starting with the 1974–75 season, and the hire proved to be a turning point in the program's history. Sutton's first campaign with the Hogs turned out to be a mildly successful one that put fans on notice, with an 11–3 conference record that was good for second place in the SWC, as high as the program had finished in conference play in seventeen years. Sutton's second team did not perform as strongly in conference play, but improved its overall record. The excitement behind Razorback basketball was palpable as renovations began on what was then officially Barnhill Arena after it was renamed in 1973 for former athletic director and head football coach, John Barnhill. Sutton's second team also had the core players that would elevate the Razorbacks to a national power under his leadership, the famed in-state players known as the "Triplets," Ron Brewer, Marvin Delph, and Sidney Moncrief (who later became the first player in program history to have his number retired).

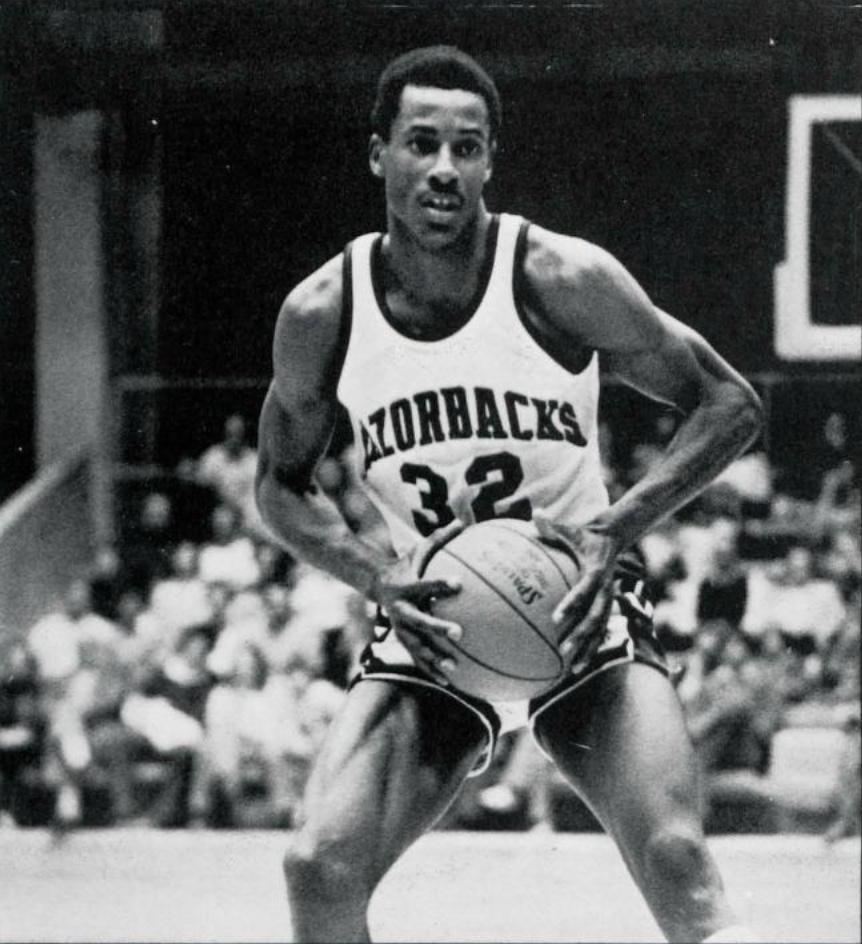
Sidney Moncrief during the 1976–77 season

The 1976–77 Razorbacks were the team that established Arkansas as a basketball power in the modern era. Beginning play in a renovated Barnhill Arena with an expanded capacity of 6,200, the Hogs won the SWC with a perfect 16–0 conference record, going 26–1 overall in the regular season and spent more weeks in the AP Poll that season than every season prior, combined, with a peak ranking of #6. The Hogs earned their first tournament invitation in nearly two decades, but fell in the first round, while still finishing ranked in the AP Poll for the first time in school history. The Hogs would follow the 1976–77 season with Sutton's most successful season at Arkansas and one of the best seasons in school history. Barnhill Arena was expanded further prior to the 1977–78 season, this time to a capacity of 9,000. The Hogs started the season ranked #7 by the AP Poll, and lived up to the high expectations of their recent success by winning their first fourteen games and never falling out of the top ten of the AP Poll the whole season. Arkansas ascended to the top spot in the AP Poll for the first time in program history on February 13, 1978. The Hogs received an at-large bid to the tournament after winning a share of the SWC Championship and beat AP #2 UCLA in the Sweet Sixteen before falling to eventual champion, Kentucky, in the Final Four in St. Louis. The fifth-ranked Hogs won the third place game against AP #6 Notre Dame, 71–69.

Sutton's 1978–79 team still managed a great campaign, despite the loss of two of the "Triplets," All-American Brewer and Delph. Repeating with a share of the Southwest Conference crown, the Hogs won the SWC Tournament to clinch the bid to the tournament. The Razorbacks advanced to the Elite Eight, where they lost a close game marred by a controversial last-minute missed tripping call to Larry Bird and undefeated Indiana State, 73–71.

While Sutton's other teams would not be as high achieving as the 1977–78 and 1978–79 squads, he would still coach the Razorbacks to successful seasons, never finishing lower than second in the Southwest Conference standings after his second season, while also producing highlights ranging from U.S. Reed's game-winning, last-second half court shot against defending champions Louisville in the second round of the 1981 NCAA Tournament, ending back-to-back national runner-up Houston's thirty-nine game SWC winning streak, having a player drafted in the first round of the NBA draft three straight years from 1983 to 1985 (Darrell Walker, Alvin Robertson, and Joe Kleine), and the Razorbacks' first win over an AP #1 team against Michael Jordan and North Carolina in Pine Bluff, Arkansas on February 12, 1984.

Sutton's eleven seasons remain the third longest tenure in Razorback basketball history. During these eleven seasons, Arkansas won or shared the Southwest Conference Championship four times. The Hogs finished ranked seven times, including four top-ten finishes and two top-five finishes. The Razorbacks were invited to the NCAA Tournament during each of the last nine seasons of Sutton's tenure. Sutton finished with a 260–75 (.776) overall record at Arkansas, including nine NCAA Tournament appearances, four Sweet Sixteen appearances, two Elite Eight appearances, and one Final Four berth.

=== Nolan Richardson era and a national championship (1985–2002) ===
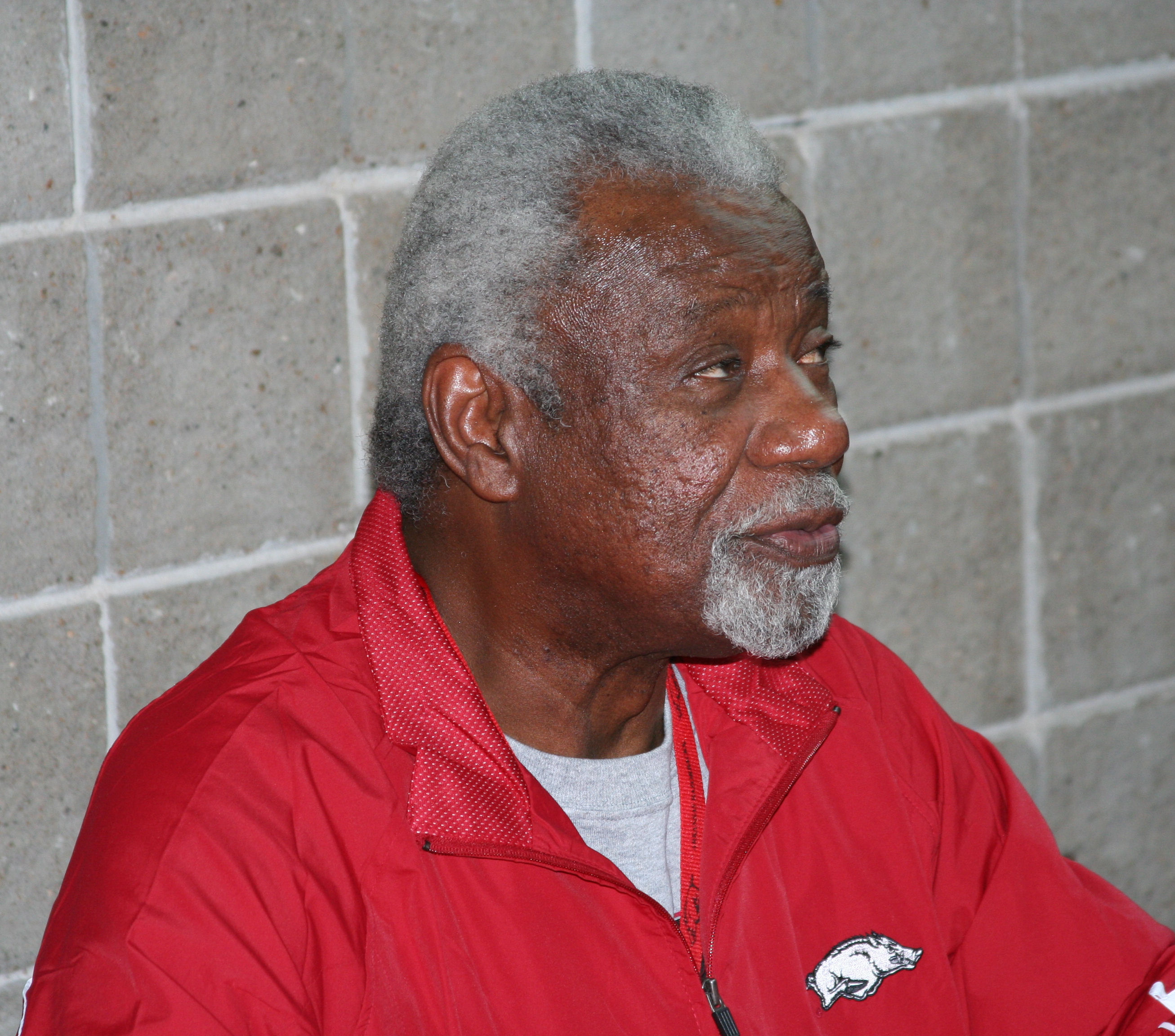
Nolan Richardson during an autograph session on March 1, 2009.

Tulsa coach and former Texas Western player Nolan Richardson replaced Sutton beginning with the 1985–86 season. After two years without a winning conference record, Arkansas finished tied for second in the Southwest Conference standings in Richardson's third season. The Razorbacks won the SWC regular season and tournament titles each of its last three seasons in the SWC (1989, 1990, and 1991).

Arkansas joined the Southeastern Conference for the 1991–92 season and won the regular season conference championship in 1992 and 1994, also winning the SEC Western Division title in 1992, 1993, 1994, and 1995. The Razorbacks also won the 2000 SEC tournament. Arkansas made the NCAA Tournament thirteen times during Richardson's seventeen seasons, and made the Final Four during the 1990, 1994 and 1995 seasons. They won their first national championship in 1994 by beating Duke in the title game. The next season, they returned to the championship game and finished as runner-up, losing to UCLA.

Richardson was fired in 2002 after making controversial public statements against the university and then-athletic director Frank Broyles. Assistant coach Mike Anderson coached the rest of the season, going 1–1. Richardson holds the school record for most wins by a head coach, with an overall record of 389–169 (.697). Coach Richardson led Arkansas to four NCAA Tournament Elite Eight appearances (1990, 1991, 1994 and 1995) and six NCAA Tournament Sweet Sixteen appearances (1990, 1991, 1993, 1994, 1995 and 1996). Between the 1989–90 and 1995–96 seasons, Arkansas won more games than any other school in the nation.

=== The Stan Heath era (2002–07) ===
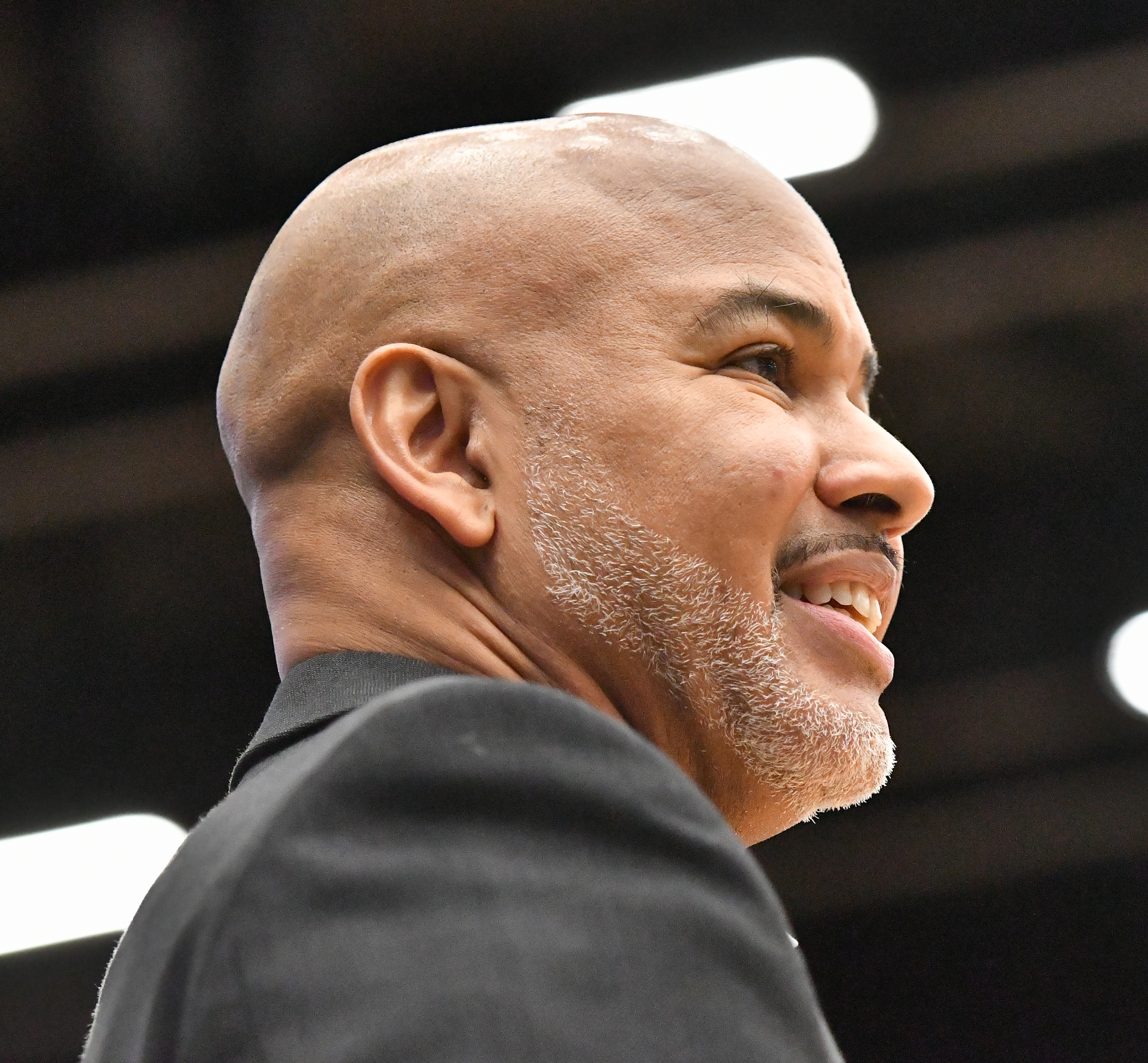

Stan Heath coached the Hogs beginning with the 2002–03 season and remained in Fayetteville through the 2006–07 season. During Heath's five seasons, the Razorbacks did not enjoy the success that they achieved under Richardson. They never finished higher than third place in the Western Division of the Southeastern Conference. They were invited to the NCAA Tournament in Heath's final two seasons, although they were eliminated in the Round of 64 each trip. Heath's overall record at Arkansas was 82–71 (.536) with a record of 31–49 (.388) in SEC play. Despite racking up 20 wins and his second consecutive NCAA tournament appearance in his final year of coaching the Razorbacks, Heath was fired after the 2006–07 season.

=== Dana Altman Day (April 2, 2007) ===
Creighton University head coach, Dana Altman was hired as the head coach of the Arkansas Razorbacks on April 2, 2007. During his introductory press conference, a visibly apprehensive Altman struggled to join in the Hog Call, stating afterwards, "I'm not sure my friends in Omaha would like to see me do that." This was a sure sign of things to come, as the following day Altman claimed that he had a change of heart and immediately resigned, returning to Creighton where he had coached since 1994.

=== John Pelphrey (2007–11) ===
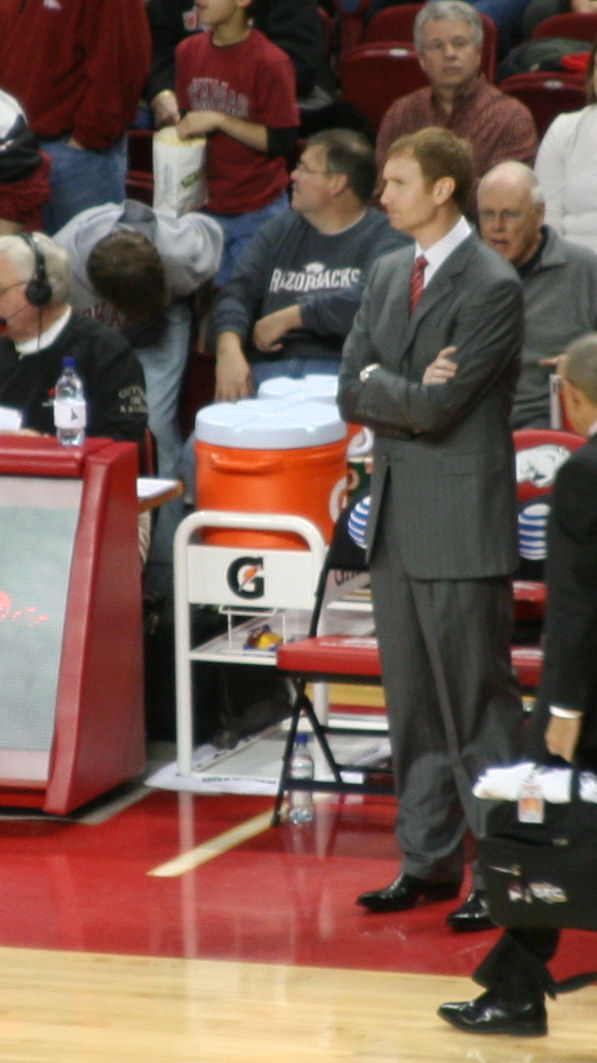

John Pelphrey was hired as the head coach of the Arkansas Razorbacks on Monday, April 9, 2007. Arkansas went 23–12 in Pelphrey's first season, defeating Indiana by 14 points in the first round of the NCAA Tournament before being put away by overall #1 seed North Carolina in the second round. The Razorbacks had an SEC regular season record of 9–7. In Pelphrey's second year, the Razorbacks struggled in conference play after starting the season 12–1 in non-conference games with two notable wins over the nationally ranked Oklahoma Sooners (#4) and the Texas Longhorns (#7). Conference wins were few and far between giving the Razorbacks a final conference record of 2–14. On March 13, 2011, John Pelphrey was dismissed as the head coach of the Razorbacks after an 18–13 season in which the Hogs missed postseason play for the third consecutive season, despite an impressive incoming recruiting class. Pelphrey finished his career at Arkansas with a record of 69–59 (.539).

=== Mike Anderson (2011–19) ===
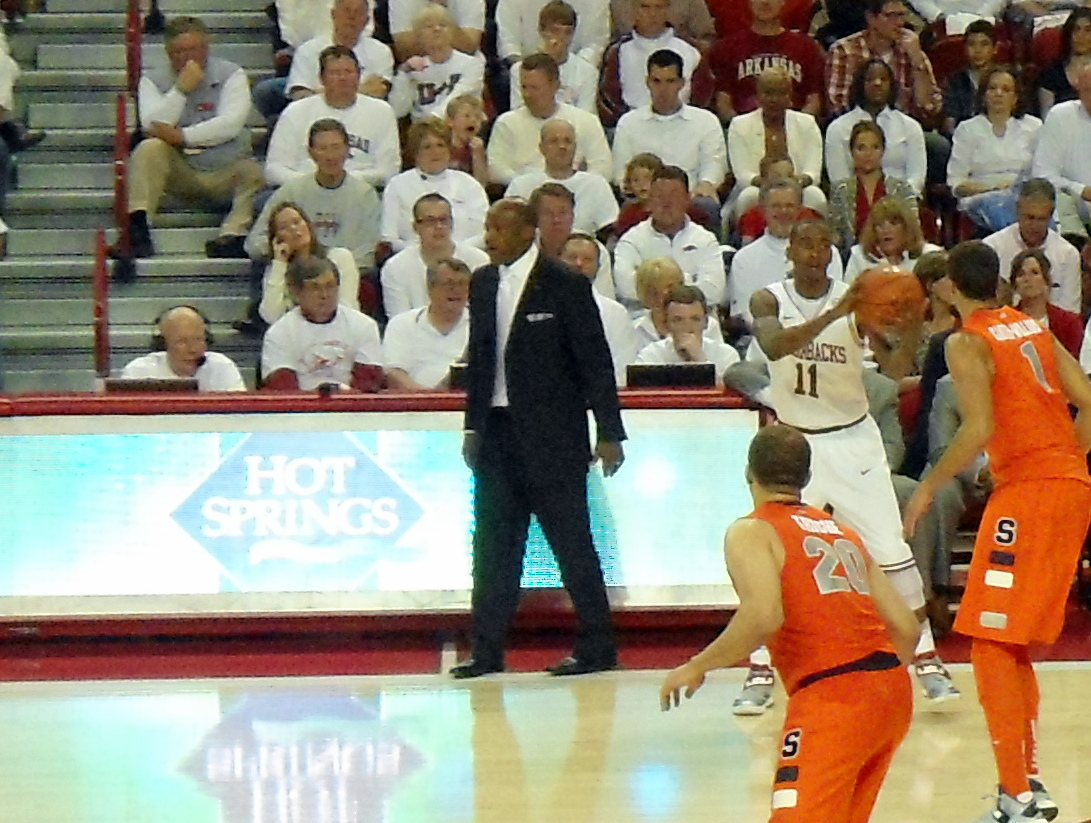

On March 23, 2011, Mike Anderson signed a 7-year contract with Arkansas. Anderson previously coached the UAB Blazers and Missouri Tigers, and had already been an assistant coach at Arkansas under coach Nolan Richardson for 17 years. On March 26, 2011, Anderson was introduced in front of 5,000 fans in Bud Walton Arena.

Anderson made three NCAA tournaments in his eight seasons, including a 27-win season in 2014–15 that resulted in a 5 seed in the tournament, the program's highest since 1999. The Razorbacks made another tournament two years later but lost to top-seeded North Carolina, the eventual national champion, in the second round. The following year saw them make the tournament for the final time in Anderson's tenure at Arkansas, but a loss to Butler ended the Hogs' season in the first round.

Following an up-and-down 2018–19 campaign that culminated in an NIT berth, new athletic director Hunter Yurachek relieved Anderson of his duties on March 26 a little over a week after Arkansas lost to Indiana in the second round of the NIT. Anderson finished his career at Arkansas with a record of 170–103 (.623), including his 1–1 record as interim coach in 2002.

=== Eric Musselman era and a return to national prominence (2019–24) ===
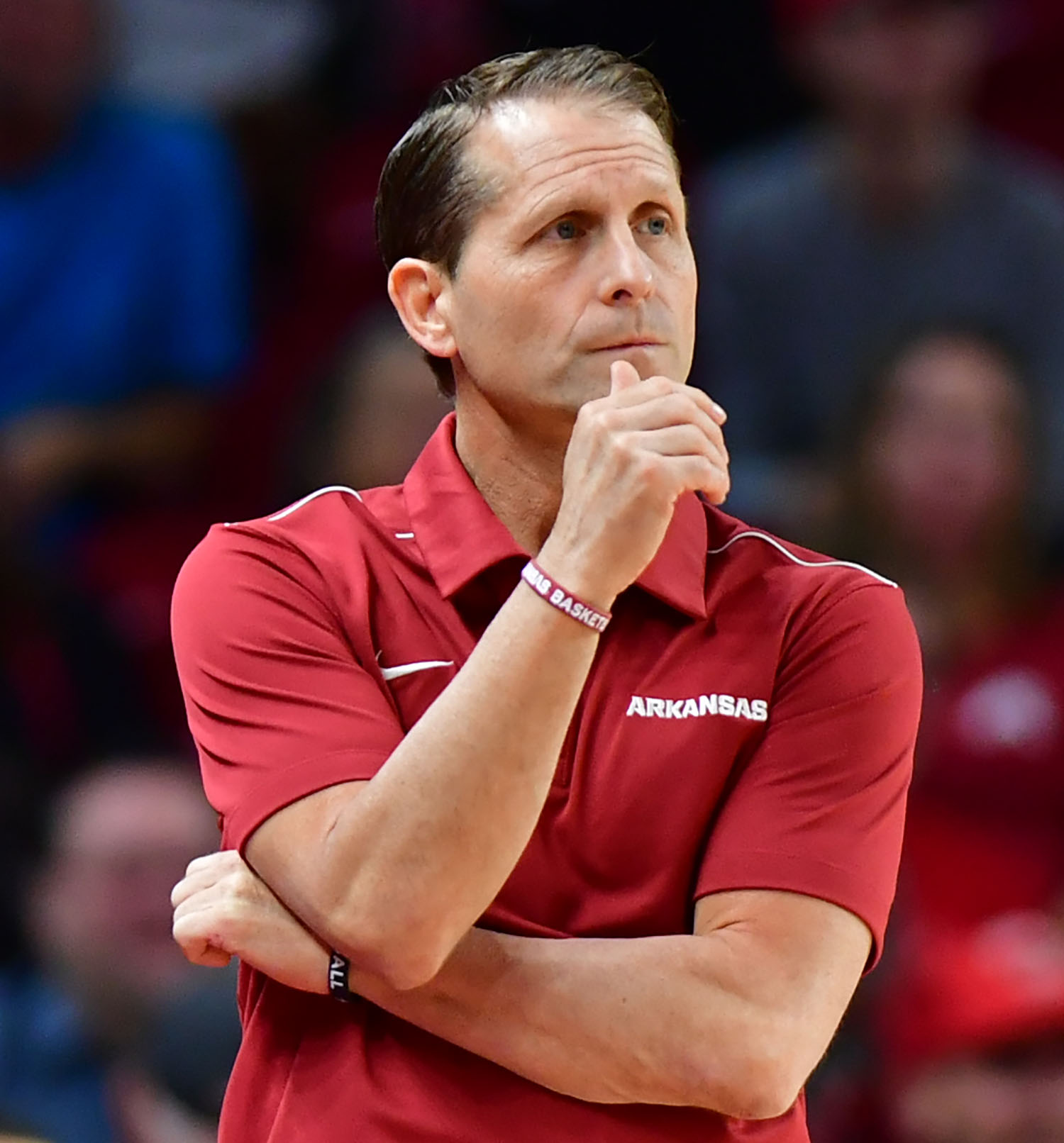
Eric Musselman coaches a Razorback basketball game.

On April 7, 2019, Yurachek announced the hiring of Eric Musselman, then the four-year head coach at the University of Nevada. Musselman had previously coached in the NBA with the Sacramento Kings and the Golden State Warriors, where he was runner up for the NBA Coach of the Year Award, as well as college assistant coaching stops at Arizona State and LSU. Musselman's first Arkansas team finished the season with a record of 20–12, with Musselman becoming only the second coach in school history to finish his first season with at least 20 wins and the first since John Pelphrey in 2007–08. Musselman was also only the second head coach at Arkansas to finish his debut season with a winning percentage above 61% since Gene Lambert during the 1942–43 season. After Arkansas beat Vanderbilt in the first round of the 2020 SEC Basketball Tournament, the rest of the SEC Tournament, as well as the entire NCAA tournament, was cancelled due to the COVID-19 pandemic, making this the final Southeastern Conference men's basketball game of the 2019–2020 season. Arkansas junior guard Mason Jones was named the SEC Co-Player of the Year by the AP.

In only his second year, Musselman led the Razorbacks to the Elite Eight of the NCAA tournament, losing to eventual champion Baylor. This was Arkansas's deepest postseason run since their 1995 title game appearance. The team finished the 2021 season with a record of 25–7 (.781), and a conference record of 13–4 (.765). Freshman guard Moses Moody was named the SEC Freshman of the Year, and became the first "one-and-done" player in program history when he was drafted in the first round (14th overall) of the 2021 NBA draft by the Golden State Warriors. Arkansas advanced further in the NCAA Tournament than any other Southeastern Conference team, and finished with an overall ranking of #6 in the USA Today Coaches Poll. In his third year, Musselman led the Razorbacks to the Elite Eight again, losing to the Duke Blue Devils. Arkansas finished the 2022 season with a record of 28–9 (.757), and a conference record of 13–5 (.722). Again, Arkansas advanced further in the NCAA tournament than any other Southeastern Conference team, and finished with a ranking of #8 in the Coaches Poll, the highest in the SEC. Arkansas also won the early season Hall of Fame Classic tournament championship. In his fourth year, Musselman signed the #2 recruiting class in the nation, but the team slipped in SEC-play, finishing 8–10. The team would recover late in the season and made it to their third consecutive Sweet 16, losing to eventual national champion, UCONN. Musselman started his fifth season as head coach with a 9–4 record through the non-conference portion of the schedule, which saw the Razorbacks upset Duke. The conference schedule proved a little tougher, as the squad began SEC play with a 1–5 record. The Hogs would continue to show very few signs of cohesive play, teamwork, or overall leadership, finishing the season with a record of 16–17, including a lackluster 6–12 mark in SEC play.

On April 4, 2024, Eric Musselman officially left Arkansas to take the vacant head coaching position at USC.

=== The John Calipari era (2024–Present day) ===
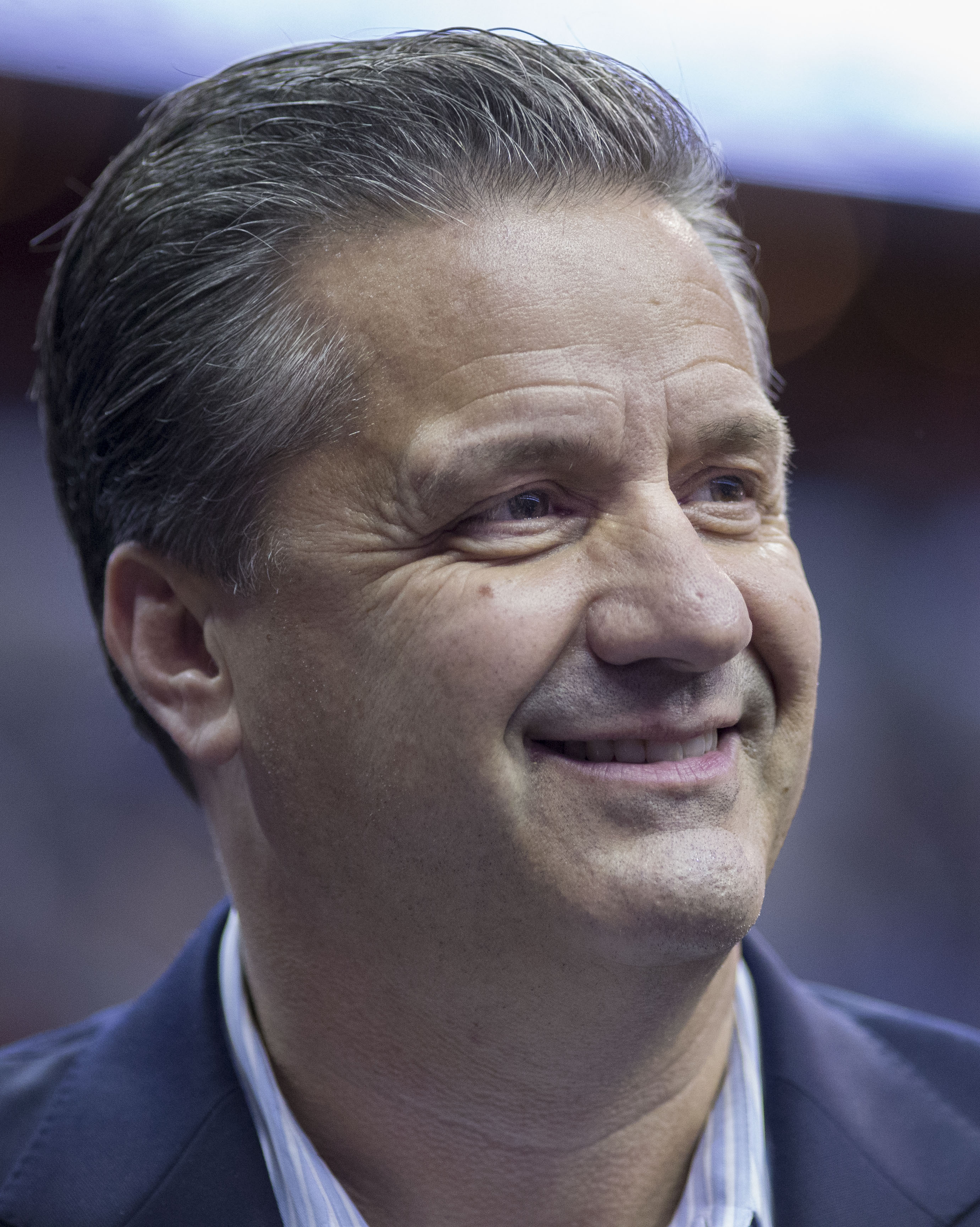

On April 10, 2024, Naismith Hall of Fame coach John Calipari, who had stepped down as head coach of Kentucky the day prior, was officially hired as the head coach of the Arkansas Razorbacks.

an 0–5 start in SEC play, and 1–6 before February, Calipari rallied his troops and eventually made the NCAA Tournament as a 10 seed in his first season, taking out Kansas and St. John's to advance to the program's 15th Sweet Sixteen and fourth in five years. The team finished with a 22-14 overall record.

In his second season as Arkansas head coach, Calipari directed the Razorbacks to a 23-8 regular season record, finishing 13-5 in SEC-play. Arkansas played one of the toughest non-conference schedules in the nation, losing close games to Duke and Houston at neutral sites, and at Michigan State. The Hogs defeated Louisville in Fayetteville and Texas Tech in Dallas. Freshman point guard Darius Acuff Jr. performed at an All-American pace for Arkansas, earning the SEC Freshman of the Year and SEC Player of the Year honors after the regular season. Calipari's Razorbacks won the 2026 SEC men's basketball tournament championship, improving their record to 26-8, and Acuff was named the tournament MVP. Arkansas received a 4-seed in the West Regional of the NCAA Tournament. In the first two rounds, Arkansas was able to dominate a physical Hawai’i team and scrape by an impressive High Point team. Arkansas eventually fell to 1-seed Arizona in the Sweet 16, finishing the season with a 28-9 overall record.

== Postseason ==
=== NCAA tournament results ===
The Razorbacks have appeared in the NCAA tournament 37 times. Their combined record is 54–37. They were national champions in 1994.

Year	Seed	Round	Opponent	Result
1941		Elite Eight; Final Four	Wyoming; Washington State	W 52–40; L 53–64
1945		Elite Eight; Final Four	Oregon; Oklahoma A&M	W 79–76; L 41–68
1949		Elite Eight; Regional 3rd Place Game	Oregon State; Wyoming	L 38–56; W 61–48
1958		Sweet Sixteen; Regional 3rd Place Game	Oklahoma State; Cincinnati	L 40–65; L 62–97
1977		Round of 32	Wake Forest	L 80–86
1978		Round of 32; Sweet Sixteen; Elite Eight; Final Four; National 3rd Place Game	Weber State; UCLA; Cal State Fullerton; Kentucky; Notre Dame	W 73–52; W 74–70; W 61–58; L 59–64; W 71–69
1979	#2	Round of 32; Sweet Sixteen; Elite Eight	#7 Weber State #3 Louisville #1 Indiana State	W 74–63; W 73–62; L 71–73
1980	#10	Round of 48	#7 Kansas State	L 53–71
1981	#5	Round of 48; Round of 32; Sweet Sixteen	#12 Mercer #4 Louisville #1 LSU	W 73–67; W 74–73; L 56–72
1982	#4	Round of 32	#5 Kansas State	L 64–65
1983	#4	Round of 32; Sweet Sixteen	#5 Purdue #1 Louisville	W 78–68; L 63–65
1984	#2	Round of 32	#7 Virginia	L 51–53 ^{OT}
1985	#9	First Round; Second Round	#8 Iowa #1 St. John's	W 63–54; L 65–68
1988	#11	First Round	#6 Villanova	L 74–82
1989	#5	First Round; Second Round	#12 Loyola Marymount #4 Louisville	W 120–101; L 84–93
1990	#4	First Round; Second Round; Sweet Sixteen; Elite Eight; Final Four	#13 Princeton #12 Dayton #8 North Carolina #10 Texas #3 Duke	W 68–64; W 86–84; W 96–73; W 88–85; L 83–97
1991	#1	First Round; Second Round; Sweet Sixteen; Elite Eight	#16 Georgia State #8 Arizona State #4 Alabama #3 Kansas	W 117–76; W 97–90; W 93–70; L 81–93
1992	#3	First Round; Second Round	#14 Murray State #6 Memphis State	W 80–69; L 80–82
1993	#4	First Round; Second Round; Sweet Sixteen	#13 Holy Cross #5 St. John's #1 North Carolina	W 94–64; W 80–74; L 74–80
1994	#1	First Round; Second Round; Sweet Sixteen; Elite Eight; Final Four; National Championship Game	#16 North Carolina A&T #9 Georgetown #12 Tulsa #3 Michigan #2 Arizona #2 Duke	W 94–79; W 85–73; W 103–84; W 76–68; W 91–82; W 76–72
1995	#2	First Round; Second Round; Sweet Sixteen; Elite Eight; Final Four; National Championship Game	#15 Texas Southern #7 Syracuse #6 Memphis #4 Virginia #2 North Carolina #1 UCLA	W 79–78; W 96–94 ^{OT} W 96–91 ^{OT} W 68–61; W 75–68; L 78–89
1996	#12	First Round; Second Round; Sweet Sixteen	#5 Penn State #4 Marquette #1 UMass	W 86–80; W 65–56; L 63–79
1998	#6	First Round; Second Round	#11 Nebraska #3 Utah	W 74–65; L 69–75
1999	#4	First Round; Second Round	#13 Siena #5 Iowa	W 94–80; L 72–82
2000	#11	First Round	#6 Miami (FL)	L 71–75
2001	#7	First Round	#10 Georgetown	L 61–63
2006	#8	First Round	#9 Bucknell	L 55–59
2007	#12	First Round	#5 USC	L 60–77
2008	#9	First Round; Second Round	#8 Indiana #1 North Carolina	W 86–72; L 77–108
2015	#5	First Round; Second Round	#12 Wofford #4 North Carolina	W 56–53; L 78–87
2017	#8	First Round; Second Round	#9 Seton Hall #1 North Carolina	W 77–71; L 65–72
2018	#7	First Round	#10 Butler	L 62–79
2021	#3	First Round; Second Round; Sweet Sixteen; Elite Eight	#14 Colgate #6 Texas Tech #15 Oral Roberts #1 Baylor	W 85–68; W 68–66; W 72–70; L 72–81
2022	#4	First Round; Second Round; Sweet Sixteen; Elite Eight	#13 Vermont #12 New Mexico State #1 Gonzaga #2 Duke	W 75–71; W 53–48; W 74–68; L 69–78
2023	#8	First Round; Second Round; Sweet Sixteen	#9 Illinois #1 Kansas #4 UConn	W 73–63; W 72–71; L 65–88
2025	#10	First Round; Second Round; Sweet Sixteen	#7 Kansas #2 St. John's #3 Texas Tech	W 79–72; W 75–66; L 83–85 ^{OT}
2026	#4	First Round; Second Round; Sweet Sixteen	#13 Hawaii #12 High Point #1 Arizona	W 97–78; W 94–88; L 88–109

=== NIT results ===
The Razorbacks have appeared in the National Invitation Tournament (NIT) four times. Their combined record is 6–5.

Year	Round	Opponent	Result
1987	First Round; Second Round	Arkansas State; Nebraska	W 67–64; L 71–78
1997	First Round; Second Round; Quarterfinals; Semifinals; 3rd Place Game	Northern Arizona; Pittsburgh; UNLV; Michigan; Connecticut	W 101–75; W 76–71; W 86–73; L 62–77; L 64–74
2014	First Round; Second Round	Indiana State; California	W 91–71; L 64–75
2019	First Round; Second Round	Providence; Indiana	W 84–72; L 60–63

== Arkansas's All-Americans ==
- - Named 1st Team All-American

Player	Position	Year(s)	Selectors
Glen Rose		1928	Helms Athletic Foundation
Tom Pickell		1929	College Humor Magazine
Gene Lambert		1929	Helms Athletic Foundation
Wear Schoonover	Forward	1930	College Humor Magazine
James "Doc" Sexton (2)		1931, 1932	College Humor Magazine
Ike Poole	Forward	1936	Helms Athletic Foundation, Converse Yearbook
Jack Robbins		1938	Newspapers Enterprise Association
John Adams	Guard/Forward	1941	Helms Athletic Foundation, Converse Yearbook
Clayton Wynne		1943	Pic Magazine
Bill Flynt		1946	Helms Athletic Foundation
George Kok (2)	Center	1946, 1948	Associated Press, The Sporting News
Fred Grim	Guard	1958	Associated Press
Clyde Rhoden	Forward	1960	Converse Yearbook
Jerry Clayton (2)	Guard	1961, 1962	Converse Yearbook
Tommy Boyer	Guard	1963	UPI, Converse Yearbook
Martin Terry	Guard	1973	Helms Athletic Foundation
Ron Brewer (2)	Guard	1977, 1978	Associated Press, Helms Athletic Foundation, Converse Yearbook, United States Writers Basketball Association, Basketball Weekly
Marvin Delph (2)	Guard	1977, 1978	Associated Press, The Sporting News, Converse Yearbook
Sidney Moncrief (3)	Guard	1977, 1978, 1979*	The Sporting News, Associated Press, UPI, NABC, Helms Athletic Foundation, Converse Yearbook, United States Writers Basketball Association
Scott Hastings (2)	Center	1981, 1982	Helms Athletic Foundation, Associated Press
Darrell Walker	Guard	1983	Associated Press, UPI, Helms Athletic Foundation, Converse Yearbook
Todd Day (3)	Guard	1990, 1991, 1992	John Wooden Award, The Sporting News, Associated Press, UPI, NABC, Helms Athletic Foundation, United States Writers Basketball Association, Basketball Weekly, Basketball Times
Oliver Miller (2)	Center	1991, 1992	Associated Press
Lee Mayberry	Guard	1992	Associated Press, NABC, Basketball Times
Scotty Thurman (2)	Guard	1994, 1995	Associated Press, Basketball Times
Corliss Williamson (2)	Forward	1994, 1995	Associated Press, John Wooden Award, The Sporting News, Basketball Weekly, NABC, UPI, United States Writers Basketball Association, Basketball Times
Pat Bradley	Guard	1999	Associated Press
Joe Johnson	Guard/Forward	2001	Associated Press
Ronnie Brewer	Guard/Forward	2006	Associated Press, Basketball Times, CollegeBasketballInsider.com
Bobby Portis	Forward	2015	Associated Press, United States Basketball Writers Association, Sporting News
Daniel Gafford	Forward	2019	Associated Press
Mason Jones	Guard	2020	Associated Press
Moses Moody	Guard	2021	Associated Press
JD Notae	Guard	2022	Associated Press, Sporting News
Darius Acuff Jr.	Guard	2026*	Associated Press, Sporting News, USBWA, NABC
Source: Arkansas Razorbacks Media Guide"Arkansas All-Americas". Arkansas Razorbacks. Archived from the original on May 28, 2008.

=== National Awards ===
In 2026, Arkansas All-American guard Darius Acuff Jr was awarded the Bob Cousy Award, given annually by the Naismith Memorial Basketball Hall of Fame to the best point guard in the nation. Acuff was the first Razorback to win the award.

=== Retired numbers ===
The University of Arkansas athletic department has seen fit to retire only two jersey numbers in honor of former outstanding players:

Arkansas Razorbacks retired numbers
No.	Player	Pos.	Tenure	Ref.
32	Sidney Moncrief	G	1975–79	
34	Corliss Williamson	F	1992–95	

Moncrief (6'4" 190 lbs.) led the Razorbacks to the 1978 Final Four and is one of only two Arkansas players to be named a Consensus 1st Team All-American. Moncrief also led the Hogs to three straight Southwest Conference regular season titles from 1977 to 1979, as well as the 1977 and 1979 SWC Tournament championships. He was a three-time All-SWC performer, and was also the SWC Player of the Year in 1979. Moncrief finished his career as the school's all-time leading scorer, until his record was broken in 1992.

Williamson (6'7" 245 lbs.) led Arkansas to the 1994 National Championship and a runner-up finish in the 1995 Final Four. Corliss also lead Arkansas to three straight SEC West Division championships from 1993 to 1995, plus the 1994 SEC regular season title. Williamson was a two-time All-SEC performer, was the 1994 and 1995 SEC Player of the Year, and was named Consensus 2nd team All-American in both seasons.

== Razorbacks after the University of Arkansas ==
=== NBA ===
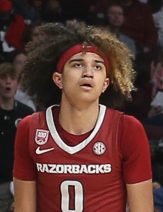
Anthony Black

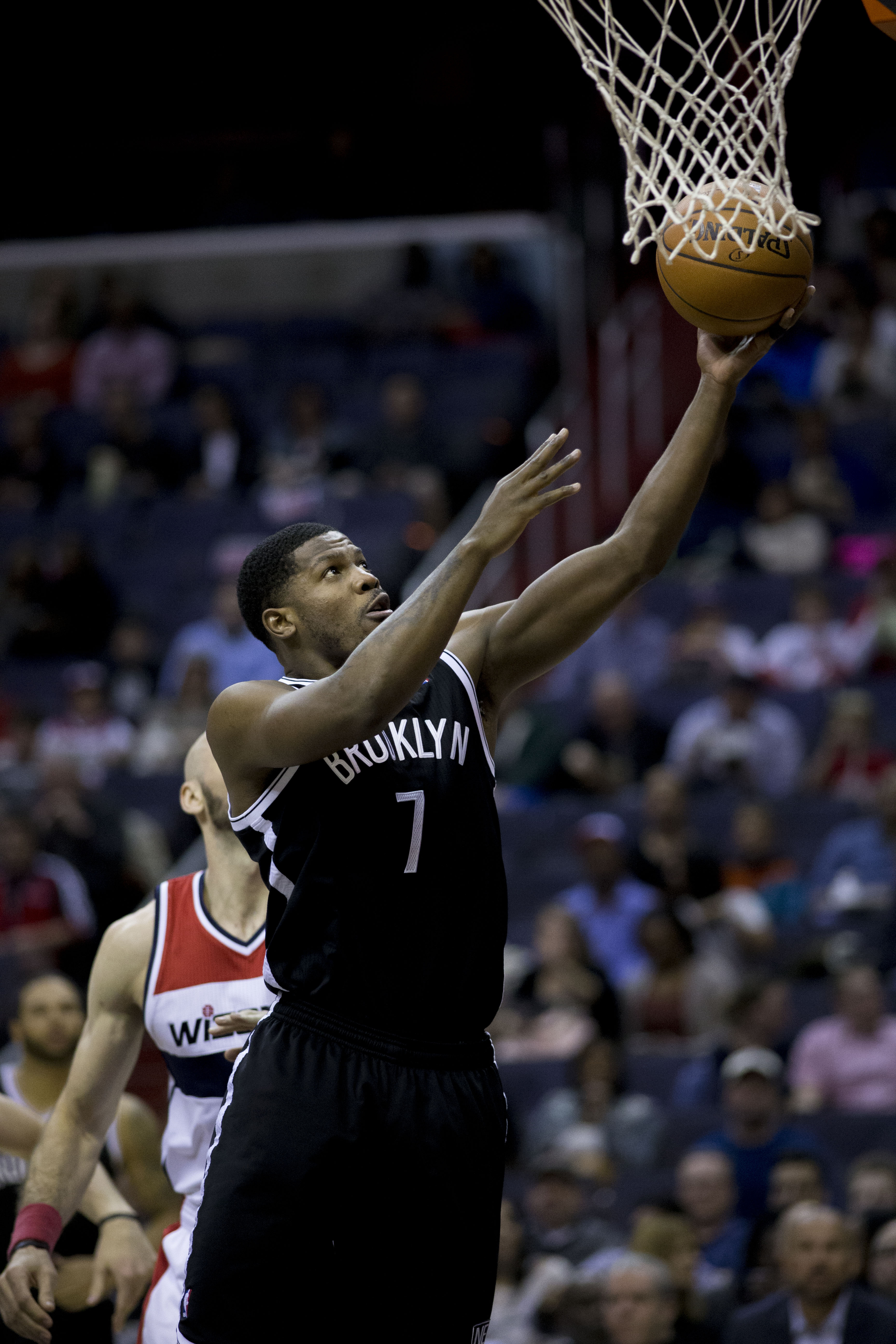
Joe Johnson, 7× NBA All-Star, while playing for the Brooklyn Nets

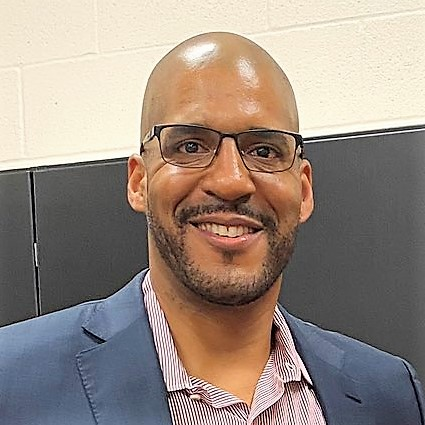
Corliss Williamson

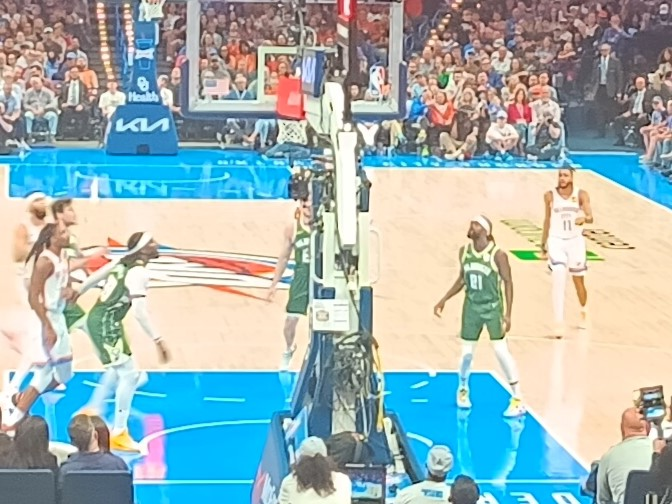
Patrick Beverley (21, green) playing for the Milwaukee Bucks against Isaiah Joe (11, white) for the Oklahoma City Thunder in 2024

- Corey Beck
- Patrick Beverley
- Anthony Black
- Ron Brewer
- Ronnie Brewer
- Tony Brown
- Coty Clarke
- Ricky Council IV
- Todd Day
- Courtney Fortson
- Daniel Gafford
- Dusty Hannahs
- Scott Hastings
- Steven Hill
- Derek Hood
- Byron Irvin
- Chris Jefferies
- Dontell Jefferson
- Isaiah Joe
- Mason Jones
- Joe Johnson
- Joe Kleine
- Andrew Lang
- Daryl Macon
- Lee Mayberry
- Clint McDaniel
- Mel McGaha
- Oliver Miller
- Sidney Moncrief
- Moses Moody
- Isaiah Morris
- Jannero Pargo
- Bobby Portis
- Alvin Robertson
- Nick Smith Jr.
- Dean Tolson
- Stanley Umude
- Darrell Walker
- Jordan Walsh
- Sonny Weems
- Jaylin Williams
- Corliss Williamson

=== Other professional leagues ===
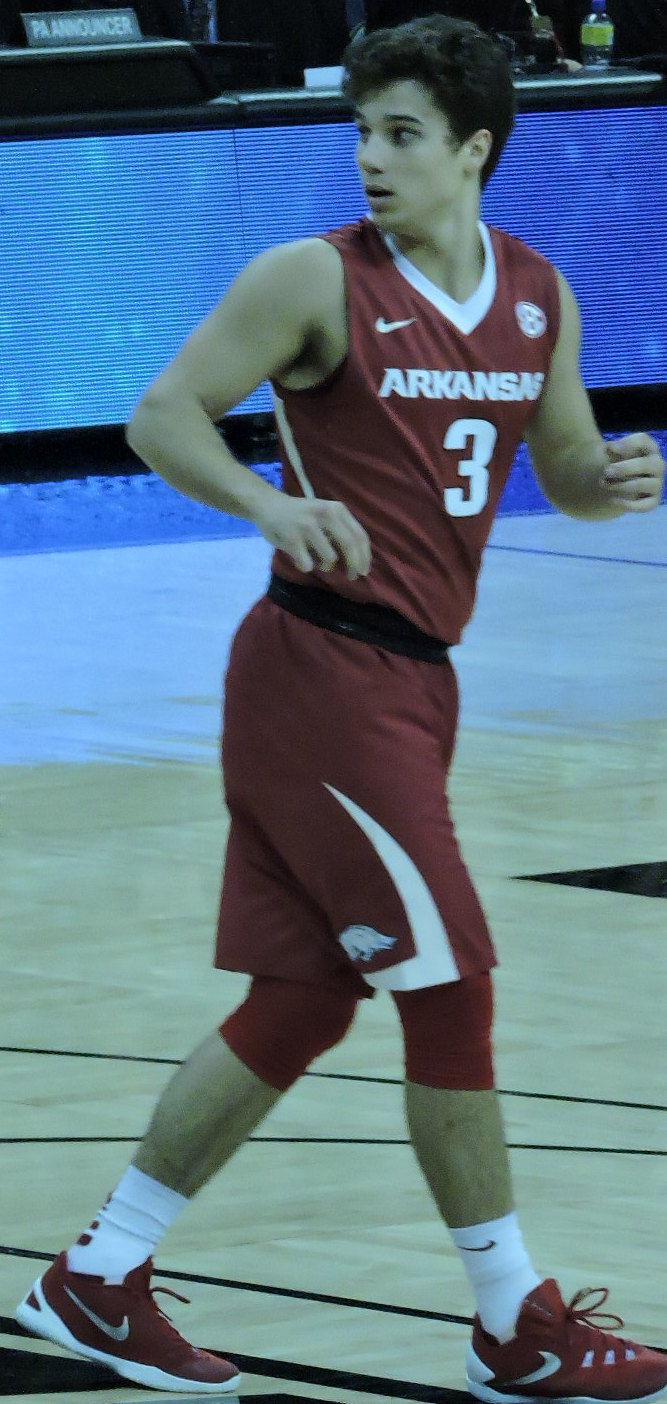
Dusty Hannahs

- Patrick Beverley (born 1988), plays for Hapoel Tel Aviv of the Israeli Basketball Premier League
- Pat Bradley (born 1976)
- Coty Clarke (born 1992), in the Israeli Basketball Premier League
- Rotnei Clarke (born 1989)
- Dusty Hannahs (born 1993), basketball player in the Israeli Basketball Premier League
- Rashad Madden (born 1992), in the Israeli National League
- Billy Pharis
- Ulysses Reed
- Kareem Reid
- Darnell Robinson
- Justin Smith (born 1999), in the Israeli Basketball Premier League
- Dwight Stewart (born 1971)
- Charles Thomas (born 1986), player for Maccabi Rishon LeZion of the Israeli Basketball Premier League
- Scotty Thurman (born 1974)
- JaCorey Williams (born 1994), for Hapoel Jerusalem of the Israeli Basketball Premier League

=== Arkansas Sports Hall of Fame ===
- Gordon Carpenter
- Sidney Moncrief
- Marvin Delph
- George Kok
- Ike Poole

=== Olympians ===
- Gordon Carpenter
- Joe Kleine
- R. C. Pitts
- Alvin Robertson

== See also ==
- Arkansas Razorbacks
