= Rimac =

Rimac may refer to:

== Places ==
- Rímac River, in Peru
- Rímac District, one of the districts in the Historical Center of Lima, Peru
- Rimac (crater), a crater on Mars

== People with the surname ==
- Beti Rimac (born 1976) Croatian volleyball player
- Davor Rimac (born 1971) Croatian basketball player
- Josipa Rimac (born 1980) Croatian politician
- Mate Rimac (born 1988) founder of Rimac Automobili
- Ružica Meglaj-Rimac (1941–1996) Yugoslav basketball player
- Slaven Rimac (born 1974) Croatian basketball player

== Sport ==
- RIMAC, a sport complex at the University of California, San Diego
- Ružica Meglaj-Rimac Cup, the national women's basketball cup of Croatia

== Transportation and vehicles ==
- Rimac Automobili, a Croatian electric car manufacturer
  - Rimac Concept One
  - Rimac Nevera
- Chilean transport Rímac (1872), a ship
- Several Peruvian Navy ships named Rimac, see list of Peruvian Navy ships

== Other uses ==
- Edificio Rímac, is a building located in the centre of the city of Lima
- Telmatobius rimac, a species of Peruvian frog
