= Crawford Elementary School =

Crawford Elementary School can refer to:

- Crawford Elementary School - Russellville, Arkansas - Russellville School District (RSD)
- Crawford Elementary School - Arcadia, Louisiana - Bienville Parish School Board
- Crawford Elementary School - Aurora, Colorado - Aurora Public Schools
- Crawford Elementary School - Houston, Texas - Houston Independent School District
- Crawford Elementary School - Crawford, Texas - Crawford Independent School District
- Crawford Elementary School - Eielson Air Force Base, Alaska - Fairbanks North Star Borough School District
