= King Cotton Classic =

King Cotton Holiday Classic is a national-level high school basketball tournament held in Pine Bluff, Arkansas. The tournament was founded by Travis Creed, a bank executive from Pine Bluff, in 1982. Once considered to be the most prestigious high school tournament in the nation, the King Cotton games were played at the 7,500-seat Pine Bluff Convention Center, and attracted top-ranked high school teams from around the country. The tournament hosted the first live high school basketball game aired on national television, a victory by Flint Hill Prep over Pine Bluff High School on December 28, 1987.

== Early years ==
The King Cotton Classic was initially sponsored by local businesses and 50 for the Future, a civic group. Later, Mt. Valley Water, Inc., Coca-Cola, and Entergy participated, and by 1989 the tournament had 112 corporate sponsors. Corporate sponsorship paid for about half of the cost of the tournament, which reached $100,000 annually. The first year they had 10 inches of ice and snow, but still had a good crowd. Attendance was often around 6,500, with one game being a sell-out. A lot of emphasis was placed on the interaction between teams and the community. In 1983, there were two other similar tourneys in the U.S.: Big Las Vegas Tournament in Nevada and Big Beach Ball Classic in South Carolina.

The King Cotton was the first to pay the teams' expenses, thereby competing with the other two tournaments. They paid for 20 people: transportation, 4 to a motel room, meals, and other benefits. It had 8 teams to start and later expanded to 12 teams each year. In the early years of the tournament the King Cotton had a girls' division with teams just from Arkansas.

== National prominence ==
On December 28, 1987, ESPN broadcast the King Cotton Tournament nationally, making it the first live high school basketball event. They also aired the event for the next four years on tape delay. In 1989, The New York Times ran an article entitled "#1 High School Holiday Tournament in the Country." Travis Creed has estimated that about 35 future NBA players were in the tournament. In addition to Corliss Williamson and Jason Kidd, some of the other noteworthy players from the tournament are: Bobby Hurley, Desmond Howard, J.R. Reid, George Lynch, Dennis Scott, Randolph Childress, Stanley Roberts, Derrick Chievous, Shareef Abdur-Rahim, Eric Snow, Joe Johnson, Rodrick Rhodes, Doug Edwards, Eric Riley, Terry Dehere, Aaron Bain, Sam Jefferson, Ronny Thompson, Ron Huery, Chris Corchiani, Jerry Walker, Kareem Reid, Chris Mills, Basil Shabazz, and Neil Reed. The King Cotton hosted an estimated 176 teams over the years in the annual four-day event. Creed owns a library of video tapes of all the games from each year.

The largest attendance was in 1991 at 7,600. This game featured the Russellville, Arkansas team that included Corliss Williamson, and the California team that included Jason Kidd. "The fire marshal would not let anyone else in," Creed stated. In the final play, Williamson blocked Kidd's last second shot attempt out-of-bounds, and Russellville won by one point. Williamson was named MVP of the tournament, but at the podium honoring the all-tournament team, he gave his MVP medal to Jason Kidd.

== Decline, discontinuation and return ==
The King Cotton was one of the first national high school basketball tournaments, and served as a model for similar tournaments in other cities. The King Cotton was eventually discontinued due to dwindling attendance, a concern for guest safety, and crowd (student) control issues. The King Cotton Holiday Classic was named a "Local Legacy" for the state of Arkansas by State Representative Jay Dickey as part of the Local Legacies project sponsored by the United States Congress.

The King Cotton Holiday Classic returned to the Pine Bluff Convention Center on December 27, 2018, as part of Go Forward Pine Bluff's Delta Celebration Series of Festivals and Events. The revived tournament featured eight teams and the Pine Bluff Convention Center Arena is set to undergo a half million dollar renovation.
