= Pat Bradley (basketball) =

American basketball player and coach

Patrick Henry Bradley (born May 16, 1976) is an American former basketball player and coach.

== High school ==
Born in Everett, Massachusetts, Bradley starred in basketball at Everett High School.

== College career ==
Bradley attended college at the University of Arkansas. Bradley played basketball for the Arkansas Razorbacks under legendary Coach Nolan Richardson, and was a four-time letterman from 1996 to 1999. By the time he left, he had set the University of Arkansas and Southeastern Conference all-time records for three-point field goals made (366) and attempted (915). His Southeastern Conference record was subsequently broken in 2008 by Chris Lofton of the University of Tennessee.

Bradley also set an SEC record with a three-point field goal in 60 consecutive games. He finished fifth on UA scoring list with 1,765 points. He was a two-time All-SEC performer in 1998 and 1999.

Bradley received his degree in communications from the University of Arkansas in 2001.

== Professional career ==
Bradley later moved on to play professional basketball in Denmark and France, as well as for a brief time for the Arkansas Rimrockers, an NBA Development League team. He also worked as a coach and in the front office for the team.

== After playing career ==
Bradley currently works as a basketball commentator for the SEC ESPN Network as of October 2016 and co-hosts a radio show on ESPN-affiliate 103.7 The Buzz in Little Rock, Arkansas, on the midday show The Zone alongside award-winning journalist Justin Acri and producer Matt Travis.

Bradley formerly worked for 93.3 The Source as a sports talk radio host. He hosted the morning show from 6 - 9 with fellow former Razorback Clint Stoerner. The name of their show was "Bradley and Stoerner in the Morning" or "BS in the Morning" for short.

He is currently on the Youth Home Foundation Board which helps at risk boys and girls and their families.

Bradley is a member of the University of Arkansas Hall of Honor (2014) and the Arkansas Sports Hall of Fame (2015).
