= Russellville School District =

School district in Arkansas, United States

Russellville School District 14

Location
- 220 West 10 St; Russellville, Arkansas 72801 United States

District information
- Grades: PK–12
- Established: 1870
- Schools: 11
- NCES District ID: 0512060

Students and staff
- Students: 5,291
- Teachers: 377.41 (on FTE basis)
- Staff: 799.41 (on FTE basis)
- Student–teacher ratio: 14.02

Other information
- Website: www.rsdk12.net

Russellville School District 14 is a public school district based in Pope County, Arkansas, United States. The school district supports more than 5,200 students from its 11 school facilities and employs more than 800 faculty and staff members in Russellville and surrounding communities.

== Schools ==
=== Secondary schools ===
- Russellville High School (Cyclones)—serving grades 10 through 12.
- Russellville Junior High School—serving grades 8 and 9.
- Russellville Middle School—serving grades 6 and 7.
- Russellville Intermediate School—serving grade 5.

=== Early childhood and elementary schools ===
- Center Valley Elementary School—serving prekindergarten through grade 4.
- Crawford Elementary School—serving prekindergarten through grade 4.
- Dwight Elementary School—serving kindergarten through grade 4.
- London Elementary School—serving prekindergarten through grade 4; located in London.
- Oakland Heights Elementary School—serving prekindergarten through grade 4.
- Sequoyah Elementary School —serving prekindergarten through grade 4.
