= Ružica Meglaj-Rimac =

Yugoslavian and Croatian basketball player

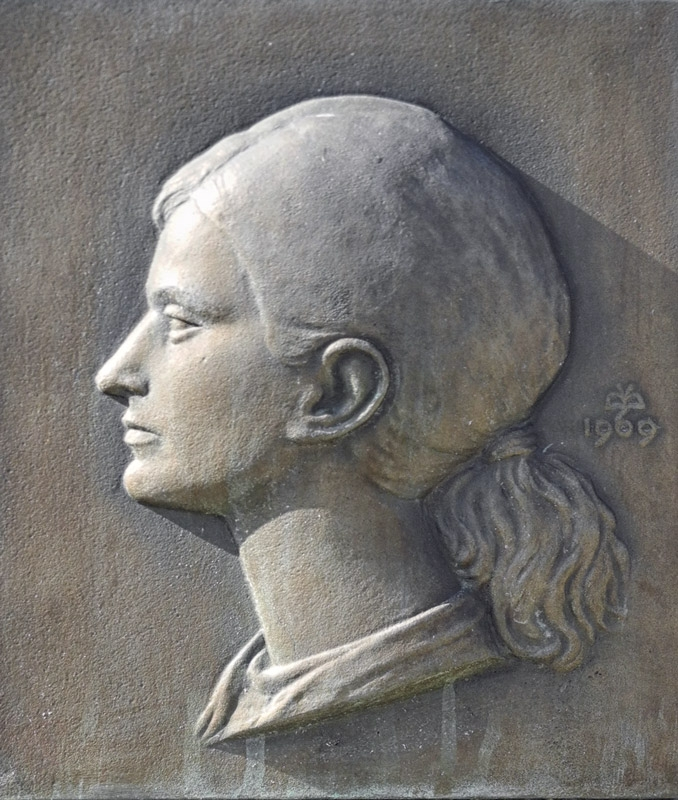
- Ružica Meglaj-Rimac

Personal information
- Born: 15 February 1941 Zagreb, Banovina of Croatia, Kingdom of Yugoslavia
- Died: 11 July 1996 (aged 55) Zagreb, Croatia

Career information
- Playing career: 1956–1971

Career history
- 1956–1971: Industromontaža Zagreb

Career highlights
- 1x Yugoslav League (1967)
Medals
Women's basketball
Representing Yugoslavia
EuroBasket Women
Silver medal – second place	1968 Messina	Team
Bronze medal – third place	1970 Rotterdam	Team

Ružica Meglaj-Rimac (15 February 1941 – 11 July 1996) was a former Yugoslav and Croatian basketball player born in Croatian-Slovenian family. The Ružica Meglaj-Rimac Cup is named after her.

== Personal life ==
Her younger sister, Kornelija Meglaj is also a former basketball player. She had two sons, former Croatian basketball players Slaven Rimac and Davor Rimac.
