= Slaven Rimac =

Croatian basketball player & coach (born 1974)

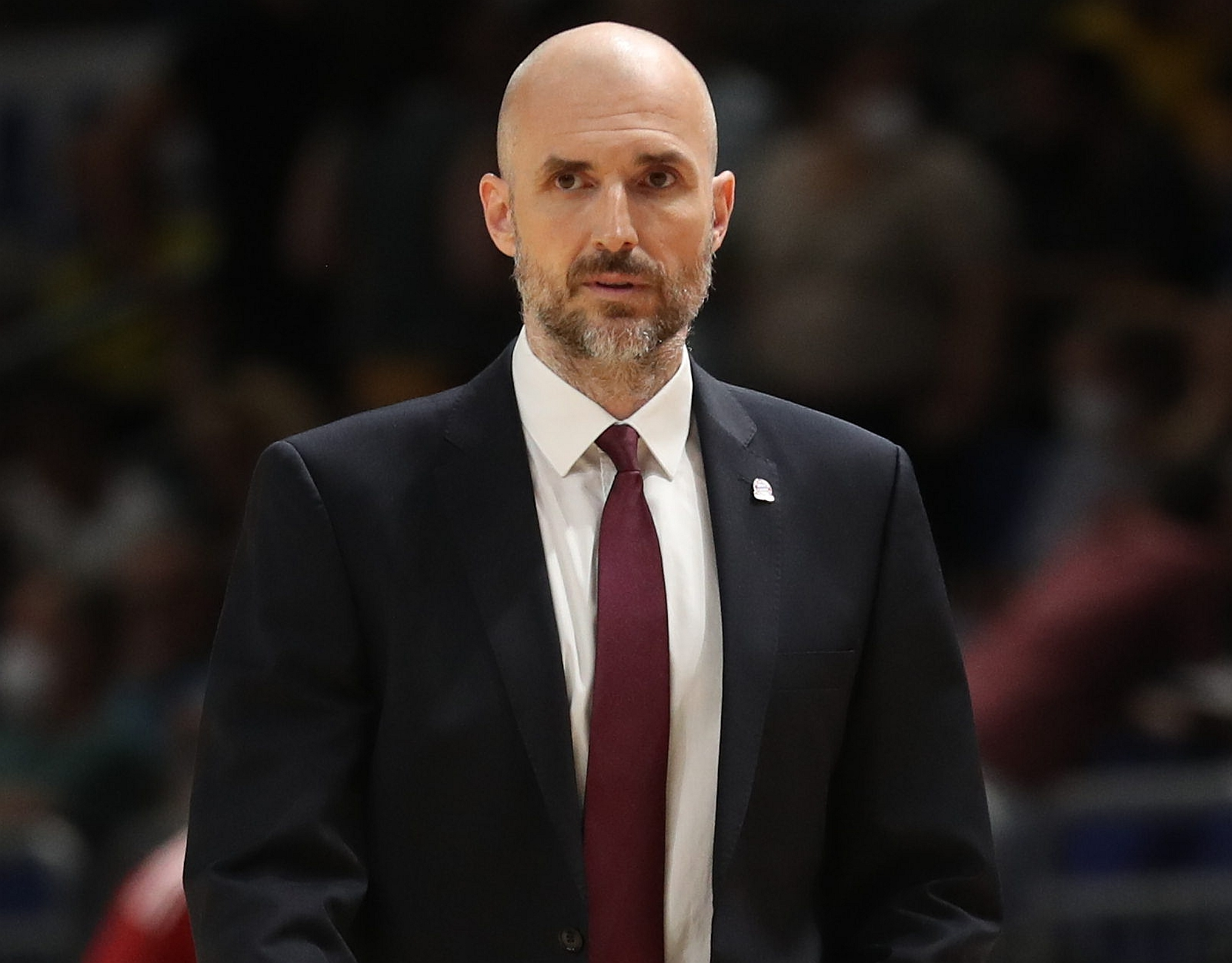
- Rimac with Bayern Munich in 2022

KK Kvarner 2010 (head coach)
- League: Premijer liga (Croatian basketball)

Personal information
- Born: 19 December 1974 (age 51) Zagreb, SR Croatia, SFR Yugoslavia
- Listed height: 6 ft 4.75 in (1.95 m)
- Listed weight: 200 lb (91 kg)

Career information
- NBA draft: 1996: undrafted
- Playing career: 1989–2012
- Position: Shooting guard
- Coaching career: 2013–present

Career history

Playing
- 1989–1990: Dubrava
- 1990–1998: Cibona
- 1998–2000: Tofaş
- 2000–2001: Joventut
- 2001–2002: Olimpia Milano
- 2002–2004: Cibona
- 2004–2005: Makedonikos
- 2005–2006: AEK Athens
- 2006–2007: Azovmash Mariupol
- 2007: Paris Basket Racing
- 2007–2008: Cedevita
- 2008: Le Havre
- 2008–2012: Pau-Orthez

Coaching
- 2013: Cibona (assistant)
- 2013–2015: Cibona
- 2017–2018: Cedevita (assistant)
- 2018–2019: Cedevita
- 2019–2020: Cedevita Olimpija
- 2021–2023: Bayern Munich (assistant)
- 2023–2025: Split

Career highlights
- As player: French 2nd Division Finals MVP (2010); 8× Croatian League champion (1992–1998, 2004); 2× Turkish League champion (1999, 2000); 2× Croatian Cup winner (1995, 1996); 2× Turkish Cup winner (1999, 2000); As head coach: ABA League champion (2014); Croatian Cup winner (2019); As assistant coach: German Cup winner (2023)

Slaven Rimac (born 19 December 1974) is a Croatian professional basketball coach and former player.

== Playing career ==
Rimac led the 1996–97 EuroLeague in free throws shooting percentage 93.1%. He retired from professional basketball in May 2012, as a member of the French club EB Pau-Orthez.

== National team career ==
Rimac was a member of the senior Croatian national basketball team at the 1996 Summer Olympics and 1997 EuroBasket.

== Coaching career ==
=== Cibona (2013–2015) ===
On 14 November 2013, following the departure of Neven Spahija, Rimac was appointed the head coach of Cibona. He led the club to win the 2013–14 ABA League championship, despite the huge financial problems that the club was facing at the time. As the champion of the ABA League, Cibona gained a direct spot in the following EuroLeague season, but the club withdrew from it in order to stabilize financially. Eventually, Crvena zvezda, the third-placed team in the league, took Cibona's spot in the EuroLeague. He was sacked in Cibona on 6 December 2015, following a series of poor results in the ABA League.

=== Cedevita (2017–2019) ===
From 2017 to 2018, Rimac worked as an assistant coach of Cedevita under the coaching staff of Jure Zdovc, while between June and October 2018, he served as the head coach of the Cedevita second team, which played in the Croatian League regular season.

On 25 October 2018, following the departure of Sito Alonso, who led the first team in the ABA League and EuroCup, Rimac was appointed his successor as Cedevita head coach. In July 2019, Cedevita merged with the Slovenian club Petrol Olimpija to form a new club named Cedevita Olimpija.

=== Cedevita Olimpija (2019–2020) ===
On 8 July 2019, Rimac was named the first head coach for Cedevita Olimpija in the club's history. On 27 January 2020, he was replaced by Jurica Golemac.

=== Bayern Munich (2021–2023) ===
On 16 August 2021, Rimac joined German powerhouse Bayern Munich as an assistant coach under Andrea Trinchieri. With Bayern, Rimac won the 2023 German Cup.

=== Split (2023–present) ===
On 26 June 2023, Rimac was appointed head coach of Split of the Croatian League and the Adriatic League. On 3 January 2025, after a string of bad results, Rimac left Split.

== Career achievements and awards ==
Club titles than Rimac won as a senior level player:

- Croatian League Champion: (with Cibona: 1991–92, 1992–93, 1993–94, 1994–95, 1995–96, 1996–97, 1997–98, 2003–04)
- Turkish League Champion: (with Tofaş: 1998–99, 1999–2000)
- Turkish Cup Winner: (with Tofaş: 1998–99, 1999–2000)

Club titles that Rimac won as a head coach:

- ABA League Champion: (with Cibona: 2013–14)
- Croatian Cup Winner: (with Cedevita: 2018–19)

== Personal life ==
His mother Ružica Meglaj-Rimac, brother Davor and aunt Kornelija Meglaj were all professional basketball players.
