= Russellville High School (Arkansas) =

Location
- 2203 S Knoxville Avenue; Russellville, Arkansas 72802; United States; 35°15′32″N 93°7′15″W

Information
- Established: 1893 (133 years ago)
- Status: Open
- School district: Russellville School District
- Principal: Dr. Nic Mounts
- Grades: 10–12
- Enrollment: 1,282 (2023–2024)
- Student to teacher ratio: 10.56
- Education system: ADE
- Classes offered: Regular, Advanced Placement
- Campus type: Rural
- Colors: Red and black
- Athletics conference: 6A West
- Mascot: Cyclone
- Feeder schools: Russellville Junior High School
- Affiliation: Arkansas Activities Association (AAA)
- Website: rhs.rsdk12.net/o/rhs

Russellville High School is a comprehensive public high school established in 1893 serving the community of Russellville, Arkansas, United States. Located in Pope County and within the Russellville micropolitan area, Russellville High School is the sole high school managed by the Russellville School District and serves students in grades ten through twelve and its feeder school is Russellville Junior High School (grades 8–9).

== Extracurricular activities ==
The Russellville High School mascot is the Cyclone, and red and black serve as the school colors.

=== Athletics ===
For the 2024-2025 seasons, the Russellville Cyclones participate in the state's second largest classification (6A) within the combined 6A/7A Central Conference. Competition is primarily sanctioned by the Arkansas Activities Association with the Cyclones competing in baseball, basketball, bowling,(boys/girls), competitive cheer, cheer, cross country, competitive dance, dance, debate, football, golf (boys/girls), soccer (boys/girls), softball, speech, swimming (girls), tennis (boys/girls, track and field, volleyball, and wrestling.

RHS has won at least 40 state championships in its athletic history with the first coming in 1933 with the Cyclone football team being recognized by the Arkansas Activities Association as state champions. In 2014, the Cyclones won state Class 6A championships in baseball, volleyball, and boys' soccer. The boys' track and field team won nine state championships between 1951 and 2012. In 2014, Russellville won its third state baseball championship (1993, 2001). In 2025, the Cyclones won their ninth Class 6A state boys' soccer championship.

== Notable alumni ==
- Scott Bradley—American composer most known for his works in Tom and Jerry (MGM) cartoons, was from Russellville.
- Natalie Canerday (1979)—Actress; roles include Sling Blade, October Sky, and Walk the Line.
- Jeff Davis—Arkansas Governor (1901–07), U.S. Senator (1907–13).
- Elizabeth Ward Gracen (1979)—Actress; crowned 1982 Miss America and 1981 Miss Arkansas.
- Greg Horne (1983)—All-American kicker/punter; four-year letterman at Arkansas; NFL professional football player.
- Zach Hocker (2010)—all-time leading scorer at the University of Arkansas with 354 career points, played for New Orleans Saints and St. Louis Rams of the NFL
- Eddie Meador (1955)—NFL professional football player and six-time All-Pro selection.
- Taelon Peter (2020)—NBA player
- Greg Standridge (1985)—member of the Arkansas Senate for District 16, which includes Russellville
- Corliss Williamson (1992)—professional basketball player and coach.
- Steve Womack (1975)—U.S. Representative for Arkansas's 3rd congressional district
