= Scotty Thurman =

American professional basketball player and assistant coach

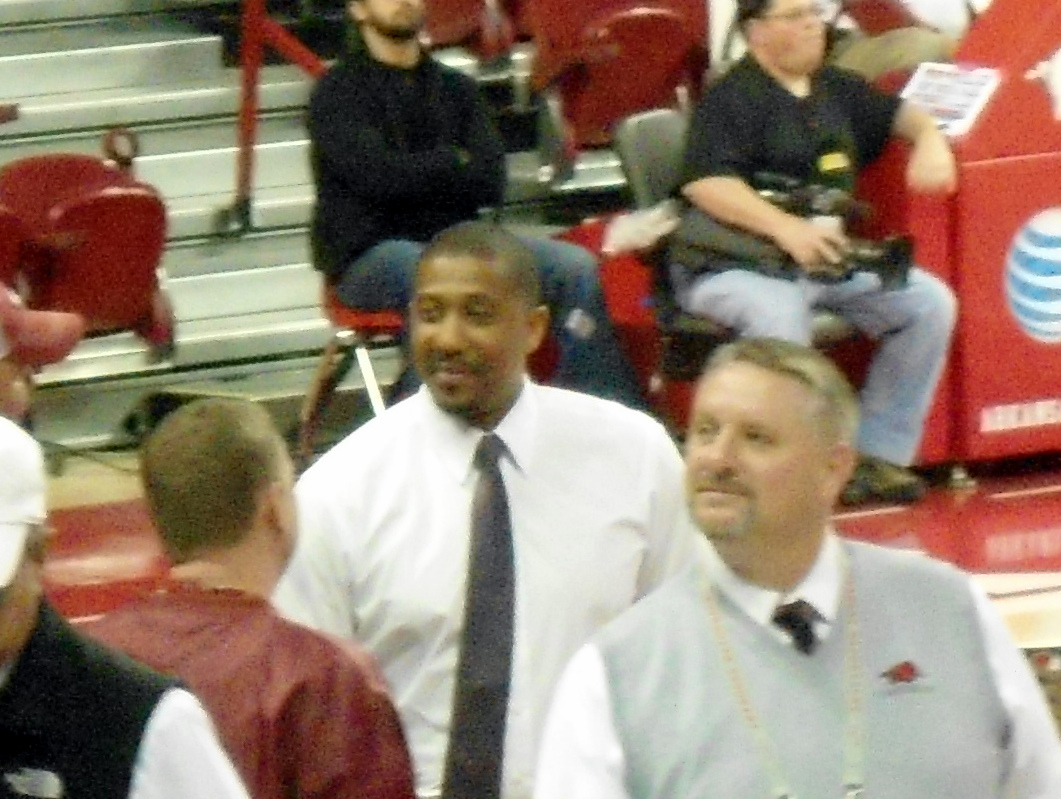

Personal information
- Born: November 10, 1974 (age 52)
- Listed height: 6 ft 6 in (1.98 m)
- Listed weight: 210 lb (95 kg)

Career information
- High school: Ruston (Ruston, Louisiana)
- College: Arkansas (1992–1995)
- NBA draft: 1995: undrafted
- Playing career: 1995–2006
- Position: Shooting guard
- Coaching career: 2016–present

Career history

Playing
- 1995–1996: Sioux Falls Skyforce
- 1996–1997: Žito Vardar
- 1997: Dafnis
- 1997–1999: Keravnos
- 1999: APOEL
- 1999–2000: Wardieh Rosaire
- 2000–2001: Keravnos
- 2001–2002: Sporting Al Riyadi Beirut
- 2003–2004: Champville
- 2004–2005: Arkansas RimRockers
- 2005: Club Sagesse
- 2005–2006: Fastlink

Coaching
- 2016–2019: Arkansas (assistant)
- 2019–2024: Parkview HS

Career highlights
- As a player: Greek League All-Star (1997); NCAA champion (1994); 3× First-team All-SEC (1993–1995)
Medals
Men's basketball
Representing United States
Goodwill Games
Bronze medal – third place	1994 St. Petersburg	National team

Scotty Thurman (born November 10, 1974) is an American former professional basketball player and current assistant coach, perhaps best known as the Arkansas Razorbacks' shooting guard who hit the high-arcing go-ahead three-pointer with 50.7 seconds left in the 1994 NCAA basketball championship game, helping to secure Arkansas' only national title to date in a 76–72 victory over the Duke Blue Devils. That shot is referred to as the "Shot heard 'round Arkansas".

== College career ==
Thurman was named to the SEC All-Freshman Team in 1993, and was First Team All-SEC in 1994 and 1995. He also received some All-American recognition from the Associated Press and the Basketball Times in 1994 and 1995. Most Razorback fans consider him to be one of the greatest players in school history. His nickname was the "Ruston Rifle", making reference to Thurman's hometown, and his shooting prowess.

After leading Arkansas to the National Championship game in 1995, Thurman, along with teammate and future NBA player Corliss Williamson, left college early to make himself available for the 1995 NBA draft. His agent and coach had told him that he would be a first-round pick, and many fans and analysts agreed with this; surprisingly, he was not drafted. He tried out unsuccessfully with the New Jersey Nets before settling with the CBA's Shreveport Storm (now defunct) in 1995–96.

== Professional career ==
While not making the NBA, Thurman played pro basketball in foreign countries including Cyprus, Greece, Lebanon and North Macedonia, and played for the ABA's professional Arkansas RimRockers in their inaugural season. In 2005, Thurman was with Fastlink of the Jordanian basketball league. Prior to that, he was signed with Riyadi Beirut of the Lebanese league.

== Coaching career ==
Thurman developed a business career with Russ Phillips. He was the director of real estate for Cypress Properties, Inc., in Little Rock, Arkansas. Thurman was named the Director of Student-Athlete Development for men's basketball at the University of Arkansas, and was also the color analyst for the radio broadcasts of Razorback games. In April 2016, Thurman was named an assistant head coach for the Razorbacks by head coach Mike Anderson. Anderson was fired by the university after the 2018–19 season, and Thurman was not retained by the new head coach, Eric Musselman.
