= Dwight Stewart =

American basketball player

Personal information
- Born: February 9, 1971 (age 55) Holly Springs, Mississippi, U.S.
- Listed height: 6 ft 9 in (2.06 m)
- Listed weight: 118 kg (260 lb)

Career information
- High school: Fairley (Memphis, Tennessee)
- College: South Plains College (1990–1991); Arkansas (1992–1995)
- NBA draft: 1995: undrafted
- Playing career: 1995–2007
- Position: Power forward / center

Career history
- 1996: San Diego Wildcards
- 1996: Keflavík
- 1996: Crvena zvezda
- 2006–2007: Arkansas Rivercatz

Career highlights
- NCAA champion (1994)

Dwight Stewart (born September 2, 1971) is an American former professional basketball player and a member of the Arkansas Razorbacks 1994 NCAA champion men's basketball team.

A 6-foot-9, 260-pound center, Stewart played professionally around the world including leagues in Iceland, Macedonia, Poland, Yugoslavia, Spain, Puerto Rico, Uruguay, and Venezuela.

== Playing career ==
Stewart won the 1994 NCAA championship with Arkansas. In 1995, he helped the team return to the championship game after scoring 15 points, including a 55-foot three pointer at the half time buzzer, in a win against North Carolina in the Final Four.

In February 1996, Stewart signed with Keflavík of the Icelandic Úrvalsdeild karla. In 3 regular season games, he averaged 19.3 points and 11.7 rebounds. In the playoffs he helped Keflavík reach the Úrvalsdeild finals where it eventually lost to rivals Grindavík. In 13 playoffs games, Stewart averaged 13.2 points and 10.6 rebounds.
