= Davor Rimac =

Croatian basketball player

Davor Rimac (born 27 October 1971 in Zagreb) is a retired Croatian professional basketball player, a 6-foot-7-inch (201 cm) guard. He was a member of the University of Arkansas Razorbacks 1994 NCAA champion men's basketball team, starting 12 games and averaging 4.8 points per game, as well as of the 1995 NCAA Tournament runner-up team.

Rimac played basketball professionally in Europe, including in Switzerland (where he won the Swiss league championship and cup in 2002 and 2004) and Croatia. His other teams included Dubrava, Cibona (junior team), Fayetteville Bulldogs, and later after college KK Zagreb, Basket Olympique Lausanne, Lugano Tigers, Geneva Devils and Hermes Analitica.

Along with NCAA and Switzerland's Cup and Championship, Rimac won a Croatian Junior championship with Dubrava and a Yugoslavian Junior championship with Cibona. He was named Gatorade Player of the year for the state of Arkansas in 1990. In high-school, he was a 2-sport athlete, and also won AAAA State in tennis.

His mother was a late Yugoslav Croatian basketball player Ružica Meglaj-Rimac. His brother is a former basketball player Slaven Rimac, who is currently an assistant coach for Bayern in Euroleague.
