= Clint McDaniel =

American basketball player

Personal information
- Born: February 26, 1972 (age 54) Tulsa, Oklahoma, U.S.
- Listed height: 6 ft 4 in (1.93 m)
- Listed weight: 180 lb (82 kg)

Career information
- High school: Booker T. Washington (Tulsa, Oklahoma)
- College: Arkansas (1991–1995)
- NBA draft: 1995: undrafted
- Position: Shooting guard
- Number: 20

Career history
- 1995: Sacramento Kings
- 1998: South East Melbourne Magic
- 1998–1999: Perth Wildcats

Career highlights
- All-NBL Third Team (1998); NCAA champion (1994); Third- Team All-SEC (1995)
- Stats at NBA.com
- Stats at Basketball Reference

Clinton Eugene McDaniel (born February 26, 1972) is a retired American professional basketball player. McDaniel played professionally in the NBA for the Sacramento Kings. He played college basketball for the Arkansas Razorbacks.

McDaniel was inducted into Booker T. Washington's 2022 Ring of Honor class during a ceremony between the Hornets’ basketball games against Bixby on Friday night, Feb 4, 2022 at Nathan E. Harris Fieldhouse.

== College career ==
A 6-foot-4-inch (1.93 m) guard from the University of Arkansas, McDaniel was a key member of the 1994 National Championship team that defeated Duke University, 76–72. Born and raised in Tulsa, Oklahoma, McDaniel was considered the best on ball defender in the country. NCAA All-Region (1994) SEC All-Conference (1995) NCAA All-Tournament (1995)

== Professional career ==
McDaniel went on to play in the National Basketball Association (NBA), signing as a free agent Sacramento Kings during the 1995-96 NBA season signing with the Washington Wizards in the 1996–97 season but was later released. He has also played professionally in Europe and in the Australian National Basketball League (NBL) with the Perth Wildcats and the South East Melbourne Magic. McDaniel has been selected as a recipient of the prestigious 2014 SEC Men's Basketball Legends Award. McDaniel is the first of only two players in SEC history to ever record 100 steals in a single season(102). McDaniel was named to the AP 3rd Team All-Conference 1995, and named to the 1995 Final Four All-Tournament Team.
