= Corey Beck =

American basketball player (born 1971)

Personal information
- Born: May 27, 1971 (age 55) Memphis, Tennessee, U.S.
- Listed height: 6 ft 1 in (1.85 m)
- Listed weight: 190 lb (86 kg)

Career information
- High school: Fairley (Memphis, Tennessee)
- College: South Plains (1990–1991); Arkansas (1992–1995)
- NBA draft: 1995: undrafted
- Playing career: 1995–2001
- Position: Point guard
- Number: 14, 15, 20

Career history
- 1995–1997: Sioux Falls Skyforce
- 1995–1996, 1997–1998: Charlotte Hornets
- 1998–2000: Sioux Falls Skyforce
- 1999: Detroit Pistons
- 1999: Charlotte Hornets
- 1999: Žalgiris Kaunas
- 2000–2001: Memphis Houn'Dawgs
- 2001: Toros de Aragua
- 2001: Roseto Basket

Career highlights
- CBA champion (1996); CBA Defensive Player of the Year (1997); CBA All-Defensive Team (1997); NCAA champion (1994)

Career NBA statistics
- Points: 241
- Assists: 123
- Rebounds: 125
- Stats at NBA.com
- Stats at Basketball Reference
Medals
Men's basketball
Representing United States
FIBA Americas Championship
Gold medal – first place	1997 Montevideo	National team
Goodwill Games
Bronze medal – third place	1994 St. Petersburg	National team

Corey Laveon Beck (born May 27, 1971) is an American former basketball player. Beck played for the Charlotte Hornets and Detroit Pistons while in the NBA. He played college basketball for South Plains College and the Arkansas Razorbacks.

== College career ==
Beck played collegiately for the University of Arkansas and was a major part of the mid-1990s Razorback teams that won one national championship in 1994 and reached the championship game the following year.

== Professional career ==
He played for the Charlotte Hornets (1995–96, 1997–98, 1998–99) and Detroit Pistons (1998–99) in the NBA for 88 games.

He was also under contract with the Chicago Bulls (October 1996), Vancouver Grizzlies (January 1999) and Minnesota Timberwolves (October 2000), but has not played in any NBA regular season games for them.

Beck played for the Sioux Falls Skyforce of the Continental Basketball Association (CBA) from 1995 to 2000. He won a CBA championship with the Skyforce in 1996. He was selected as the CBA Defensive Player of the Year and named to the All-Defensive Team in 1997.

Following his NBA career, he played one season with the Memphis Houn'Dawgs of the ABA.

He also played professionally in Italy for Fila Biella (Serie A2, 2001) and Euro Roseto (Serie A, 2001).

== Personal life ==
In September 2007, Beck and a friend were shot in an attempted robbery in Memphis. Beck was shot in the hand and face and was listed in critical condition following the shooting, but later improved.
