= Corliss Williamson =

American basketball player and coach (born 1973)

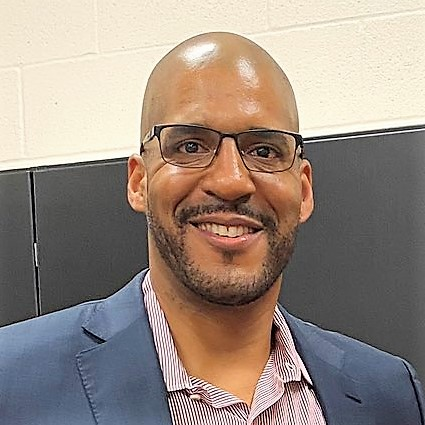
- Williamson in 2021

San Antonio Spurs
- Title: Assistant coach
- League: NBA

Personal information
- Born: December 4, 1973 (age 52) Russellville, Arkansas, U.S.
- Listed height: 6 ft 7 in (2.01 m)
- Listed weight: 245 lb (111 kg)

Career information
- High school: Russellville (Russellville, Arkansas)
- College: Arkansas (1992–1995)
- NBA draft: 1995: 1st round, 13th overall pick
- Drafted by: Sacramento Kings
- Playing career: 1995–2007
- Position: Small forward / power forward
- Number: 4, 34, 35, 14
- Coaching career: 2007–present

Career history

Playing
- 1995–2000: Sacramento Kings
- 2000–2001: Toronto Raptors
- 2001–2004: Detroit Pistons
- 2004–2005: Philadelphia 76ers
- 2005–2007: Sacramento Kings

Career highlights
- NBA champion (2004); NBA Sixth Man of the Year (2002); NCAA champion (1994); NCAA Final Four Most Outstanding Player (1994); 2× Consensus second-team All-American (1994, 1995); SEC Male Athlete of the Year (1994); 2× SEC Player of the Year (1994, 1995); Gatorade National Player of the Year (1992); McDonald's All-American (1992); First-team Parade All-American (1992); Third-team Parade All-American (1991)

Career NBA statistics
- Points: 9,147 (11.1 ppg)
- Rebounds: 3,183 (3.9 rpg)
- Assists: 972 (1.2 apg)
- Stats at NBA.com
- Stats at Basketball Reference
Medals
Men's basketball
Representing United States
FIBA U21 World Championship
Gold medal – first place	1993 Valladolid	National team

Corliss Mondari Williamson (born December 4, 1973) is an American basketball coach who serves as an assistant coach for the San Antonio Spurs of the National Basketball Association (NBA). He is also a former player who played for four teams during his 12-year career. In 2002, Williamson was selected as NBA Sixth Man of the Year. His nickname is "Big Nasty", a moniker he received from his AAU coach when he was 13. Williamson was a dominating power forward in college at Arkansas, but an undersized power forward in the NBA and mostly played at the small forward position.

== Amateur career ==
=== High school ===
Corliss Williamson played basketball at Russellville High School, where he achieved numerous accolades. He was a three-time all-conference and all-state selection, and was named the Gatorade National Player of the Year in 1992. Prior to his senior year, Williamson held his own against future teammate Chris Webber in an AAU championship game, getting 37 points to Webber's 38 points. As a senior Williamson averaged twenty-eight points and nine rebounds per game, and led his team to the King Cotton Classic championship. In the title game, Russellville defeated a team led by Jason Kidd, with Williamson blocking a potential game-winner by Kidd at the buzzer. Williamson was named tournament MVP, but gave his medal to his teammate, Marcus Thompson, at the award podium. Williamson closed out his high school career with a selection to play in the 1992 McDonald's All-American Game. He came in second in scoring to game MVP Othella Harrington, with fourteen points, and also had ten rebounds. His #34 jersey has been retired by Russellville High and hangs on the wall of the school's arena, along with his McDonald's All-American jersey.

=== College ===
Williamson played at the University of Arkansas from 1992 to 1995. In the 1992–93 season, Williamson led Arkansas to a 22–9 record and a Sweet 16 appearance in the NCAA Tournament, losing to the eventual national champion, the North Carolina Tar Heels. Williamson averaged 14.6 points and 5.1 rebounds per game, and was named to the SEC All-Freshman Team.

In the 1993–94 season, Williamson was named Most Outstanding Player of the NCAA Tournament while leading the Razorbacks to a 31–3 record and their only championship under coach Nolan Richardson by defeating the Duke Blue Devils, 76–72, in the title game. Williamson led the team into the championship game in 1995 as well, but Arkansas lost to UCLA, finishing 32–7.

In three seasons at Arkansas, Williamson was named to the SEC All-Freshman Team in 1993, and was 1st Team All-SEC in 1993, 1994, and 1995. He was also named the SEC Player of the Year for the 1993–94 and 1994–95 seasons, and was named 2nd Team All-American for both years as well. In addition to the 1994 NCAA National Championship, Williamson also led the Razorbacks to the SEC West Division title all three seasons, and the SEC regular season championship in 1994. Williamson finished his career at Arkansas with 1,728 points, which ranks 8th all-time in school history. Williamson was inducted into the Arkansas Sports Hall of Fame in 2009. His jersey (#34) is one of only two that have ever been retired by the University of Arkansas, along with Sidney Moncrief (#32). He is considered one of the five greatest players in school history.

== NBA career ==
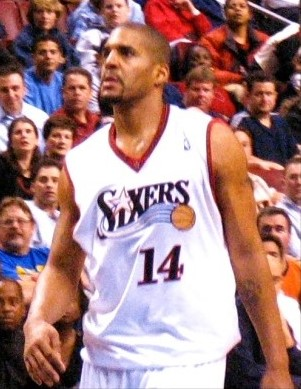
Williamson with the Philadelphia 76ers in 2005

Williamson declared for the NBA draft following his junior season, and was selected by the Sacramento Kings as a lottery pick (13th overall) in the first round of the 1995 NBA draft. His best career year was in the 1997–98 season when he played 79 games and averaged 17.7 points per game for the Kings, finishing second to Alan Henderson for the NBA Most Improved Player Award. After Sacramento traded him prior to the 2000–01 season to the Toronto Raptors (in exchange for Doug Christie), for whom he played 42 games, Williamson was traded to the Detroit Pistons, along with Kornel David, Tyrone Corbin, and a 2005 first-round draft choice in a package for Jerome Williams and Eric Montross. In the 2001–02 season he was named the NBA's Sixth Man of the Year and eventually was a member of the Pistons' 2003–04 NBA Championship team. Although coming off the bench, Williamson served a pivotal role in the Detroit offense. His coaches often looked to him in the low post when the Pistons needed a basket, where his unique skill set made him a difficult matchup as he was too powerful for small forwards to guard and too quick for power forwards. After being traded by the Pistons along with an undisclosed amount of cash to the Philadelphia 76ers for Derrick Coleman and Amal McCaskill on August 8, 2004, he was again traded back to the Kings along with Brian Skinner and Kenny Thomas for power forward Chris Webber on February 22, 2005.

Williamson has the distinction of being one of the few professional basketball players to win championships at three different levels, AAU, the NCAA with Arkansas, and the NBA with Detroit.

== Coaching career ==
Williamson announced his retirement in September 2007 to become an assistant coach at Arkansas Baptist College. He worked as a volunteer coach during his three years at Arkansas Baptist, succeeding Charles Ripley as the head coach for his final season at the school.

On March 12, 2010, Williamson was announced as the men's head basketball coach at the University of Central Arkansas in Conway, Arkansas. Promising to play an exciting style of play similar to his former head coach Nolan Richardson, Williamson's teams improved gradually each season, but still never won more than half of their games.

On August 2, 2013, Williamson left Central Arkansas to become an assistant for the Sacramento Kings.

On June 29, 2016, Williamson was hired by the Orlando Magic as an assistant coach. Vogel had previously been an assistant coach to Williamson when he played for the 76ers. However, after Frank Vogel was fired in 2018, Williamson would be fired as well.

On June 27, 2018, Williamson was hired by the Phoenix Suns as an assistant coach. Williamson was previously connected to Igor by playing under him back when Kokoškov was an assistant coach for the Detroit Pistons during the 2003–04 championship season. However, when Kokoškov was fired after his only season as head coach for the Suns, Williamson would also be fired alongside the rest of the team's coaching staff that season.

On June 30, 2023, Williamson was signed by the Minnesota Timberwolves as an assistant coach.

On August 18, 2025, Williamson was announced as an assistant coach for the San Antonio Spurs.

== NBA career statistics ==
Legend
GP	Games played	GS	Games started	MPG	Minutes per game
FG%	Field goal percentage	3P%	3-point field goal percentage	FT%	Free throw percentage
RPG	Rebounds per game	APG	Assists per game	SPG	Steals per game
BPG	Blocks per game	PPG	Points per game	**Bold**	Career high
†	Won an NBA championship	*	Led the league

=== Regular season ===
Year	Team	GP	GS	MPG	FG%	3P%	FT%	RPG	APG	SPG	BPG	PPG
1995–96	Sacramento	53	3	11.5	.466	.000	.560	2.2	.4	.2	.2	5.6
1996–97	Sacramento	79	31	25.1	.498	.000	.560	4.1	1.6	.8	**.6**	11.6
1997–98	Sacramento	79	75	**35.7**	.495	.000	.630	5.6	**2.9**	1.0	**.6**	**17.7**
1998–99	Sacramento	50*	50*	27.5	.485	.200	.638	4.1	1.3	.6	.2	13.2
1999–00	Sacramento	76	**76**	22.5	.500	–	.769	3.8	1.1	.5	.3	10.3
2000–01	Toronto	42	31	21.2	.471	.000	.646	3.6	.8	.4	.3	9.3
2000–01	Detroit	27	9	29.5	**.534**	–	.626	**6.2**	1.0	**1.3**	.3	15.2
2001–02	Detroit	78	7	21.9	.510	.200	.805	4.1	1.2	.6	.3	13.6
2002–03	Detroit	**82**	1	25.1	.453	.182	.790	4.4	1.3	.5	.3	12.0
2003–04†	Detroit	79	0	19.9	.505	–	.731	3.2	.7	.4	.3	9.5
2004–05	Philadelphia	48	5	22.0	.465	.000	.788	3.7	.9	.5	.3	10.8
2004–05	Sacramento	24	4	19.6	.473	–	**.823**	3.4	1.5	.5	.1	9.3
2005–06	Sacramento	37	0	9.8	.417	**1.000**	.776	1.8	.4	.2	.1	3.4
2006–07	Sacramento	68	1	19.7	.510	.000	.715	3.3	.6	.4	.2	9.1
Career		822	293	22.8	.490	.136	.714	3.9	1.2	.6	.3	11.1

=== Playoffs ===
Year	Team	GP	GS	MPG	FG%	3P%	FT%	RPG	APG	SPG	BPG	PPG
1996	Sacramento	1	0	2.0	.000	–	**1.000**	.0	.0	.0	.0	1.0
1999	Sacramento	5	**5**	26.0	.575	–	.700	3.2	**1.2**	.4	.2	10.6
2000	Sacramento	5	**5**	17.4	**.688**	–	.917	3.0	.2	.2	.0	6.6
2002	Detroit	10	0	**27.0**	.464	.000	.763	**5.3**	1.0	**.9**	.2	**13.3**
2003	Detroit	15	0	15.5	.411	–	.741	2.2	1.0	.3	.2	7.8
2004†	Detroit	**22**	0	14.9	.364	.000	.809	2.2	.7	.3	.1	5.7
2005	Sacramento	5	0	8.0	.375	.000	.778	1.2	.6	.2	**.4**	5.2
2006	Sacramento	3	0	3.8	.400	–	**1.000**	.3	.0	.0	.0	2.3
Career		66	10	16.7	.436	.000	.781	2.6	.8	.3	.2	7.5
