= Femininity =

Attributes associated with women and girls

Venus with a Mirror (c. 1555) by Titian, showing the goddess Venus as the personification of femininity

Femininity (also called womanliness) is a set of attributes, behaviors, and roles generally associated with women and girls. Femininity can be understood as socially constructed, and there is also some evidence that some behaviors considered feminine are influenced by both cultural factors and biological factors. To what extent femininity is biologically or socially influenced is subject to debate. It is conceptually distinct from both the female biological sex and from womanhood, as all humans can exhibit feminine and masculine traits, regardless of sex and gender.

Traits traditionally cited as feminine include gracefulness, gentleness, empathy, humility, and sensitivity, though traits associated with femininity vary across societies and individuals, and are influenced by a variety of social and cultural factors. It has traditionally been contrasted with masculinity.

== Overview and history ==
The Birth of Venus (1486, Uffizi) is a classic representation of femininity painted by Sandro Botticelli. Venus was a Roman goddess principally associated with love, beauty and fertility.

Despite the terms femininity and masculinity being in common usage, there is little scientific agreement about what femininity and masculinity are. Among scholars, the concept of femininity has varying meanings.

Professor of English Tara Williams suggests that modern ideas of femininity in English-speaking society emerged during the medieval period, around the time of the bubonic plague in the 1300s. Women in the Early Middle Ages were referred to simply within their traditional roles of maiden, wife, or widow. After the Black Death in England killed nearly half the population, traditional gender roles shifted, creating new opportunities for women in society. The words femininity and womanhood were first recorded in Chaucer's works around 1380.

In 1949, French intellectual Simone de Beauvoir wrote that "no biological, psychological or economic fate determines the figure that the human female presents in society" and "one is not born, but rather becomes, a woman". The idea was picked up in 1959 by Canadian-American sociologist Erving Goffman and in 1990 by American philosopher Judith Butler, who theorized that gender is not fixed or inherent but is rather a socially defined set of practices and traits that have, over time, grown to become labelled as feminine or masculine. Goffman argued that women are socialized to present themselves as "precious, ornamental and fragile, uninstructed in and ill-suited for anything requiring muscular exertion" and to project "shyness, reserve and a display of frailty, fear and incompetence".

Scientific efforts to measure femininity and masculinity were pioneered by psychologists Lewis Terman and Catherine Cox Miles in the 1930s. Their M–F model became influential among researchers and psychologists, shaping early gender studies. The model posited that femininity and masculinity were inherent and stable traits, difficult to measure, and fundamentally opposite to one another. It also suggested that deviations or imbalances between these traits could contribute to mental health disorders, an idea that has since been widely challenged by modern psychology.

Alongside the women's movement of the 1970s, researchers began to move away from the M–F model, developing an interest in androgyny. The Bem Sex Role Inventory and the Personal Attributes Questionnaire were developed to measure femininity and masculinity on separate scales. Using such tests, researchers found that the two dimensions varied independently of one another, casting doubt on the earlier view of femininity and masculinity as opposing qualities.

Second-wave feminists, influenced by de Beauvoir, believed that although biological differences between females and males were innate, the concepts of femininity and masculinity had been culturally constructed, with traits such as passivity and tenderness assigned to women and aggression and intelligence assigned to men. Girls, second-wave feminists said, were then socialized with toys, games, television, and school into conforming to feminine values and behaviors. In her significant 1963 book The Feminine Mystique, American feminist Betty Friedan wrote that the key to women's subjugation lay in the social construction of femininity as childlike, passive, and dependent, and called for a "drastic reshaping of the cultural image of femininity."

== Behavior and personality ==
Traits such as nurturance, sensitivity, sweetness, supportiveness, gentleness, warmth, charm, cooperativeness, expressiveness, modesty, humility, empathy, affection, tenderness, and being emotional, kind, helpful, devoted, and understanding have been cited as stereotypically feminine. The defining characteristics of femininity vary between and even within societies.

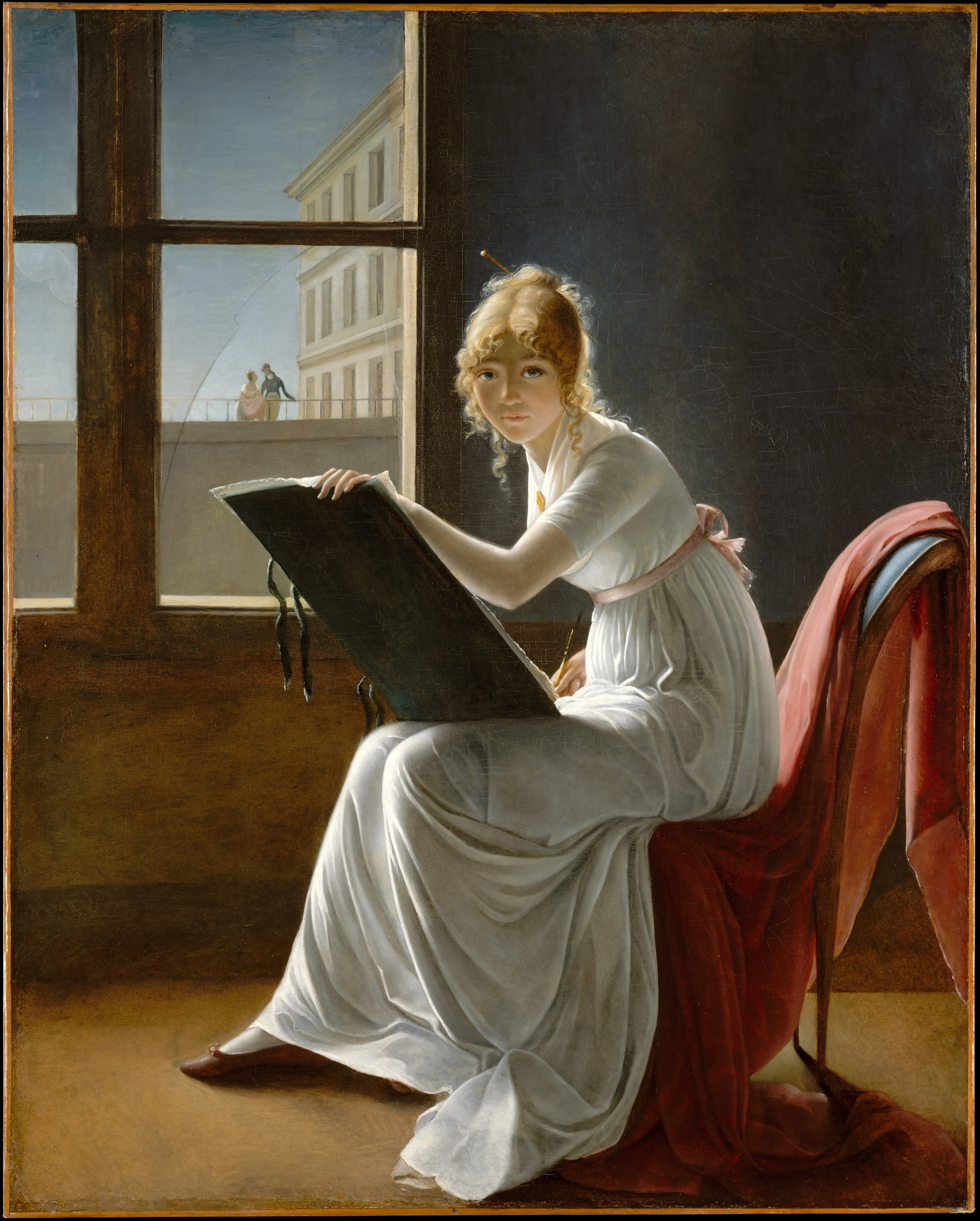
Portrait of Charlotte du Val d'Ognes by Marie-Denise Villers, 1801, Metropolitan Museum of Art (possibly a self-portrait), depicts an independent feminine spirit.

The relationship between feminine socialization and heterosexual relationships has been studied by scholars, as femininity is related to women's and girls' sexual appeal to men and boys. Femininity is sometimes linked with sexual objectification. A 2010 study found women in Canada and United States commonly initiate and maintain sexual interactions (proceptivity). A study in the United States found women flirt more in traditional, physical, sincere, and polite styles than men. Feminine charm has been described as a combination of friendliness and flirting.

Scholars have debated the extent to which gender identity and gender-specific behaviors are due to socialization versus biological factors. Social and biological influences are thought to be mutually interacting during development. Studies of prenatal androgen exposure have provided some evidence that femininity and masculinity are partly biologically determined. Other possible biological influences include evolution, genetics, epigenetics, and hormones (both during development and in adulthood).

In 1959, researchers such as John Money and Anke Ehrhardt proposed the prenatal hormone theory. Their research argues that sexual organs bathe the embryo with hormones in the womb, resulting in the birth of an individual with a distinctively male or female brain; this was suggested by some to "predict future behavioral development in a masculine or feminine direction". This theory, however, has been criticized on theoretical and empirical grounds and remains controversial. In 2005, scientific research investigating sex differences in psychology showed that gender expectations and stereotype threat affect behavior, and a person's gender identity can develop as early as three years of age. Money also argued that gender identity is formed during a child's first three years.

People who exhibit a combination of both masculine and feminine characteristics are considered androgynous, and feminist philosophers have argued that gender ambiguity may blur gender classification. Modern conceptualizations of femininity also rely not just upon social constructions, but upon the individualized choices made by women.

Philosopher Mary Vetterling-Braggin argues that all characteristics associated with femininity arose from early human sexual encounters which were mainly male-forced and female-unwilling, because of male and female anatomical differences. Others, such as Carole Pateman, Ria Kloppenborg, and Wouter J. Hanegraaff, argue that the definition of femininity is the result of how females must behave in order to maintain a patriarchal social system.

In his 1998 book Masculinity and Femininity: the Taboo Dimension of National Cultures, Dutch psychologist and researcher Geert Hofstede wrote that only behaviors directly connected with procreation can, strictly speaking, be described as feminine or masculine, and yet every society worldwide recognizes many additional behaviors as more suitable to females than males, and vice versa. He describes these as relatively arbitrary choices mediated by cultural norms and traditions, identifying "masculinity versus femininity" as one of five basic dimensions in his theory of cultural dimensions. Hofstede describes as feminine behaviors including service, permissiveness, and benevolence, and describes as feminine those countries stressing equality, solidarity, quality of work-life, and the resolution of conflicts by compromise and negotiation.

In Carl Jung's school of analytical psychology, the anima and animus are the two primary anthropomorphic archetypes of the unconscious mind. The anima and animus are described by Jung as elements of his theory of the collective unconscious, a domain of the unconscious that transcends the personal psyche. In the unconscious of the male, it finds expression as a feminine inner personality: anima; equivalently, in the unconscious of the female, it is expressed as a masculine inner personality: animus.

== Clothing and appearance ==
In Western cultures, the ideal of feminine appearance has traditionally included long, flowing hair, clear skin, a narrow waist, a more prominent chest and hips in relation to the waist, and little or no body hair or facial hair. In other cultures, however, some expectations are different. For example, in many parts of the world, underarm hair is not considered unfeminine. Today, the color pink is strongly associated with femininity.

These feminine ideals of beauty have been criticized as restrictive, unhealthy and even racist. In particular, the prevalence of anorexia and other eating disorders in Western countries has frequently been blamed on the modern feminine ideal of thinness.

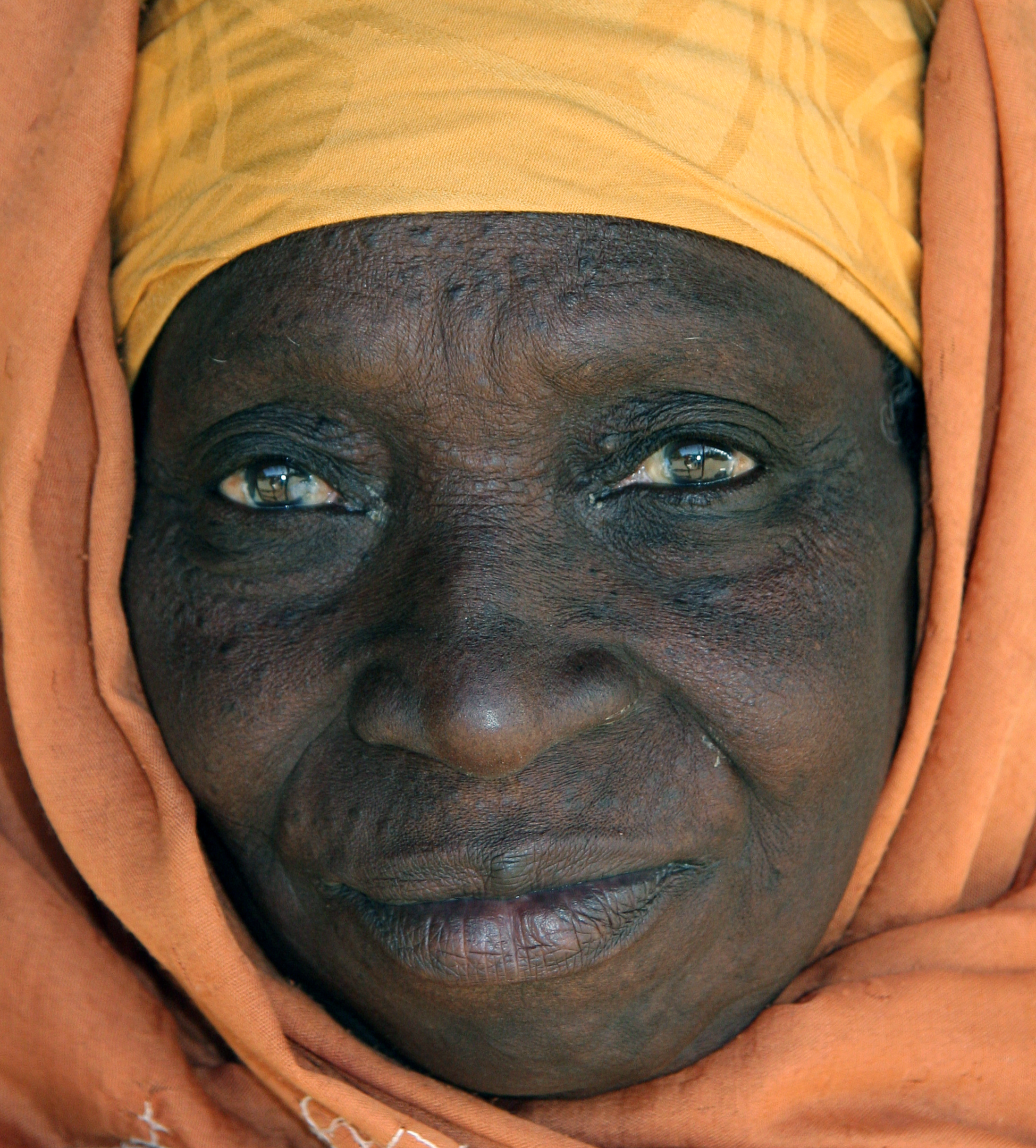
Muslim woman wearing a headdress (Hijab)

In many Muslim countries, women are required to cover their heads with a hijab (veil). It is considered a symbol of feminine modesty and morality. Some, however, see it as a symbol of objectification and oppression.

=== In history ===
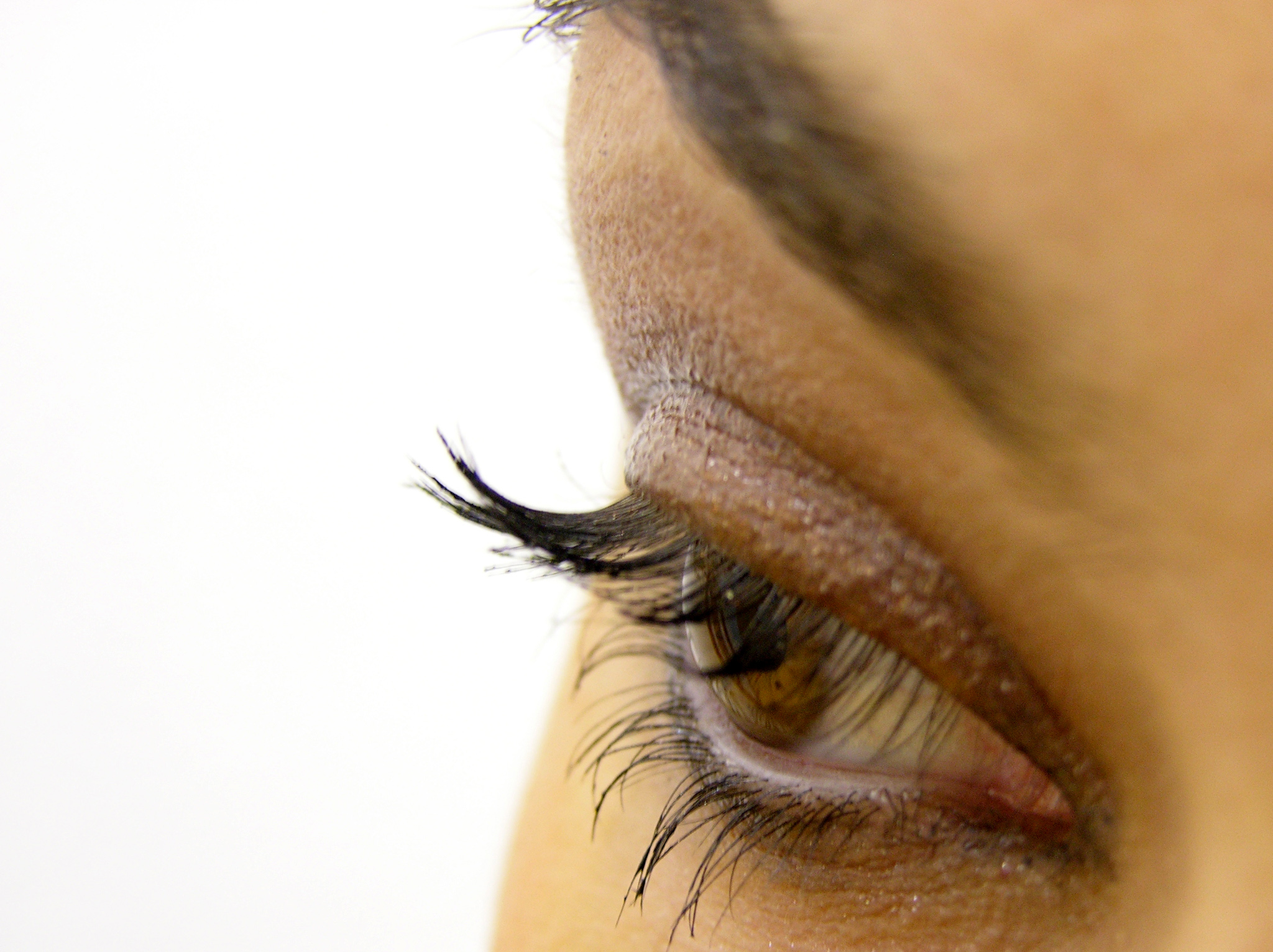
In some cultures, cosmetics are associated with femininity.

Cultural standards vary on what is considered feminine. For example, in 16th century France, high heels were considered a distinctly masculine type of shoe, though they are currently considered feminine.

In Ancient Egypt, sheath and beaded net dresses were considered female clothing, while wraparound dresses, perfumes, cosmetics, and elaborate jewelry were worn by both men and women. In Ancient Persia, clothing was generally unisex, though women wore veils and headscarves. Women in Ancient Greece wore himations; and in Ancient Rome women wore the palla, a rectangular mantle, and the maphorion.

The typical feminine outfit of aristocratic women of the Renaissance was an undershirt with a gown and a high-waisted overgown, and a plucked forehead and beehive or turban-style hairdo.

=== Body alteration ===
Body alteration is the deliberate altering of the human body for aesthetic or non-medical purpose. One such purpose has been to induce perceived feminine characteristics in women.

For centuries in Imperial China, smaller feet were considered to be a more aristocratic characteristic in women. The practice of foot binding was intended to enhance this characteristic, though it made walking difficult and painful.

In a few parts of Africa and Asia, neck rings are worn in order to elongate the neck. In these cultures, a long neck characterizes feminine beauty. The Padaung of Burma and Tutsi women of Burundi, for instance, practice this form of body modification.

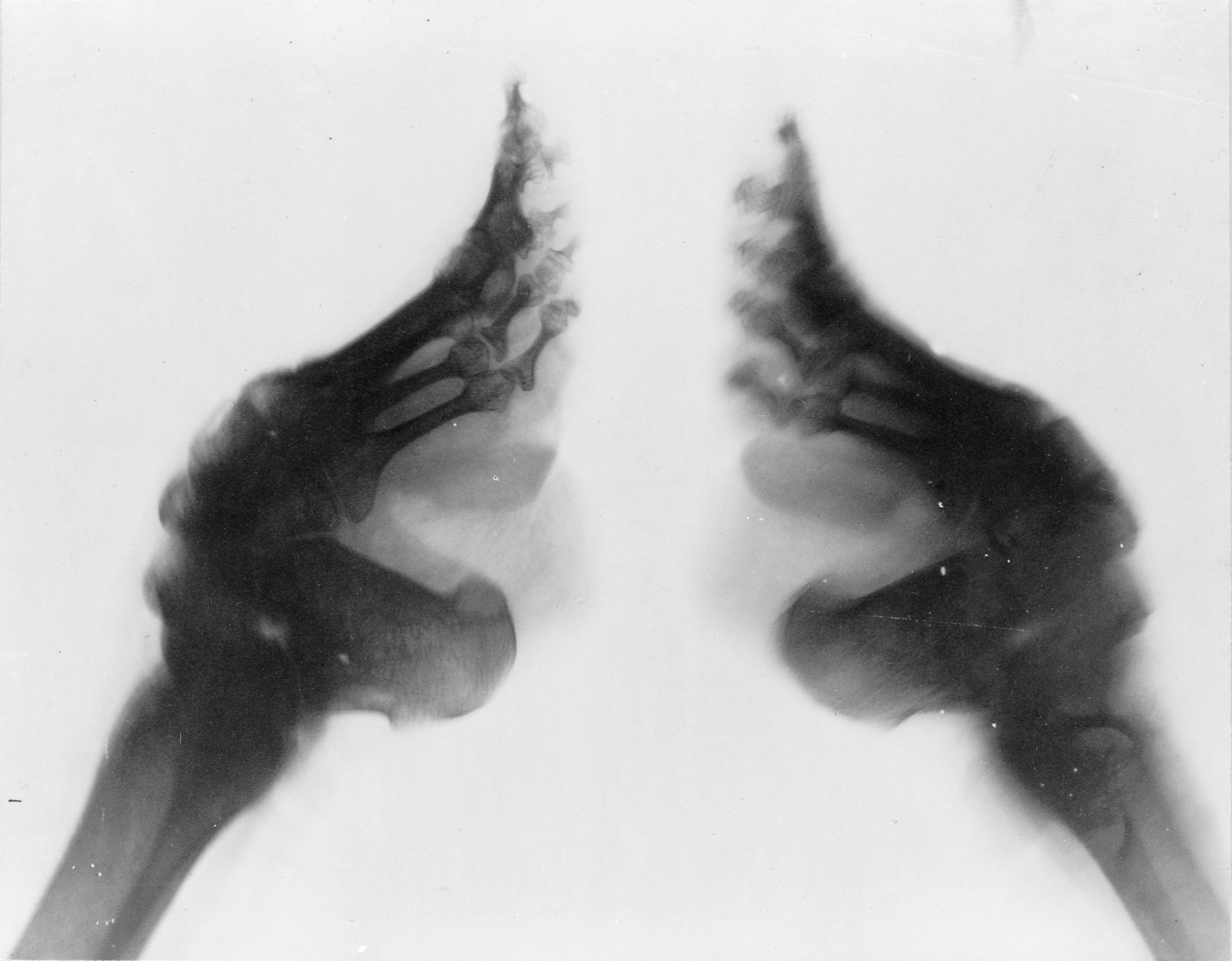
In China until the twentieth century, tiny, bound feet for women were considered aristocratic and feminine.

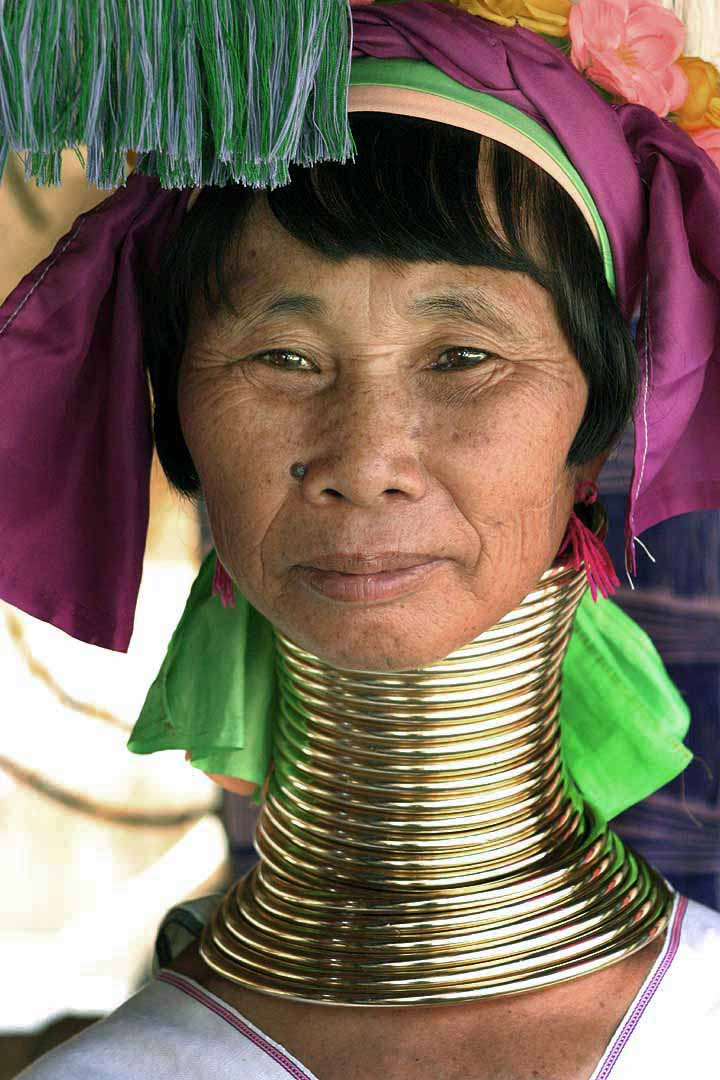
The Kayan people of Burma (Myanmar) associate the wearing of neck rings with feminine beauty.

== Traditional roles ==
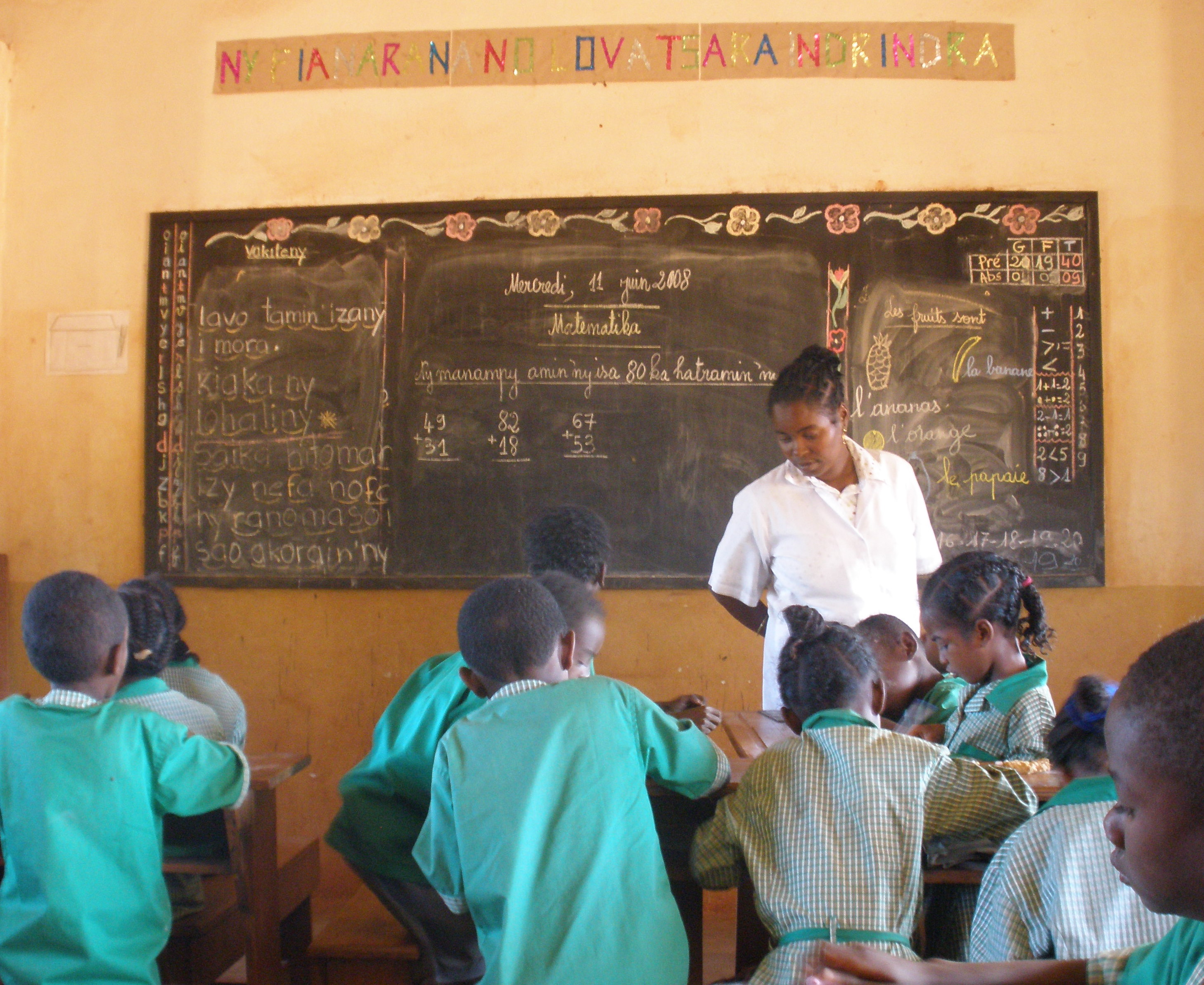
Teacher in a classroom in Madagascar (c. 2008). Primary and secondary school teaching is often considered a feminine occupation.

Femininity as a social construct relies on a binary gender system that treats men and masculinity as different from, and opposite to, women and femininity. In patriarchal societies, including Western ones, conventional attitudes to femininity contribute to the subordination of women, as women are seen as more compliant, vulnerable, and less prone to violence.

Gender stereotypes influence traditional feminine occupations, resulting in microaggression toward women who break traditional gender roles. These stereotypes include that women have a caring nature, have skill at household-related work, have greater manual dexterity than men, are more honest than men, and have a more attractive physical appearance. Occupational roles associated with these stereotypes include: midwife, teacher, accountant, data entry clerk, cashier, salesperson, receptionist, housekeeper, cook, maid, social worker, and nurse. Occupational segregation maintains gender inequality and the gender pay gap. Certain medical specializations, such as surgery and emergency medicine, are dominated by a masculine culture and have a higher salary.

Leadership is associated with masculinity in Western culture and women are perceived less favorably as potential leaders. However, some people have argued that feminine-style leadership, which is associated with leadership that focuses on help and cooperation, is advantageous over masculine leadership, which is associated with focusing on tasks and control. Female leaders are more often described by Western media using characteristics associated with femininity, such as emotion.

=== Explanations for occupational imbalance ===
Psychologist Deborah L. Best argues that primary sex characteristics of men and women, such as the ability to bear children, caused a historical sexual division of labor and that gender stereotypes evolved culturally to perpetuate this division.

The practice of bearing children tends to interrupt the continuity of employment. According to human capital theory, this retracts from the female investment in higher education and employment training. Richard Anker of the International Labour Office argues human capital theory does not explain the sexual division of labor because many occupations tied to feminine roles, such as administrative assistance, require more knowledge, experience, and continuity of employment than low-skilled masculinized occupations, such as truck driving. Anker argues the feminization of certain occupations limits employment options for women.

==== Role congruity theory ====
Role congruity theory proposes that people tend to view deviations from expected gender roles negatively. It supports the empirical evidence that gender discrimination exists in areas traditionally associated with one gender or the other. It is sometimes used to explain why people have a tendency to evaluate behavior that fulfills the prescriptions of a leader role less favorably when it is enacted by a woman.

== Religion and politics ==
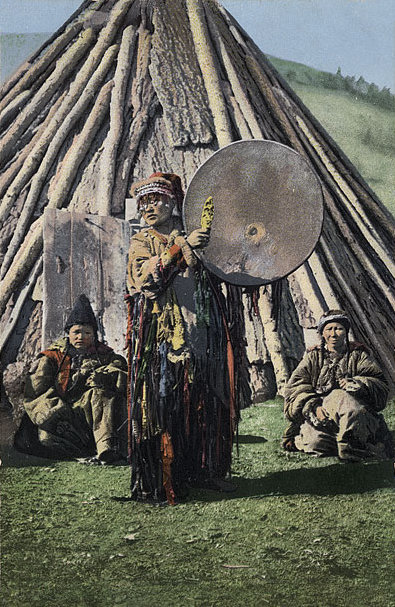
The Altai consider shamanism a feminine role.

=== Asian religions ===
Shamanism may have originated as early as the Paleolithic period, predating all organized religions. Archeological finds have suggested that the earliest known shamans were female, and contemporary shamanic roles such as the Korean mudang continue to be filled primarily by women.

In Hindu traditions, Devi is the female aspect of the divine. Shakti is the divine feminine creative power, the sacred force that moves through the entire universe and the agent of change. She is the female counterpart without whom the male aspect, which represents consciousness or discrimination, remains impotent and void. As the female manifestation of the supreme lord, she is also called Prakriti, the basic nature of intelligence by which the Universe exists and functions. In Hinduism, the universal creative force Yoni is feminine, with inspiration being the life force of creation.

Yin and yang

In Taoism, the concept of yin represents the primary force of the female half of yin and yang. The yin is also present, to a smaller proportion, in the male half. The yin can be characterized as slow, soft, yielding, diffuse, cold, wet, and passive.

=== Abrahamic theology ===
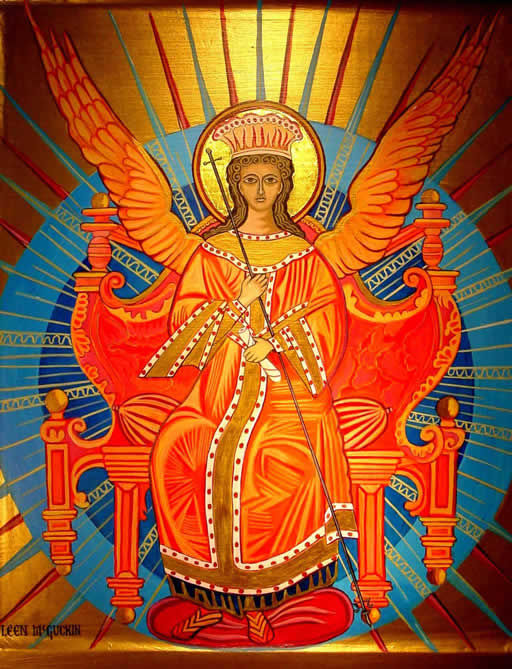
Holy Wisdom: Hagia Sophia

Although the Abrahamic God is typically described in masculine terms—such as father or king—many theologians argue that this is not meant to indicate the gender of God. According to the Catechism of the Catholic Church, God "is neither man nor woman: he is God". Several recent writers, such as feminist theologian Sallie McFague, have explored the idea of "God as mother", examining the feminine qualities attributed to God. For example, in the Book of Isaiah, God is compared to a mother comforting her child, while in the Book of Deuteronomy, God is said to have given birth to Israel.

The Book of Genesis describes the divine creation of the world out of nothing or ex nihilo. In Wisdom literature and in the wisdom tradition, wisdom is described as feminine. In many books of the Old Testament, including Wisdom and Sirach, wisdom is personified and called she. According to David Winston, because wisdom is God's "creative agent," she must be intimately identified with God.

The Wisdom of God is feminine in Hebrew: Chokmah, in Arabic: Hikmah, in Greek: Sophia, and in Latin: Sapientia. In Hebrew, both Shekhinah (the Holy Spirit and divine presence of God) and Ruach HaKodesh (divine inspiration) are feminine.

In Christian Kabbalah, Chokmah (wisdom and intuition) is the force in the creative process that God used to create the heavens and the earth. Binah (understanding and perception) is the great mother, the feminine receiver of energy and giver of form. Binah receives the intuitive insight from Chokmah and dwells on it in the same way that a mother receives the seed from the father, and keeps it within her until it's time to give birth. The intuition, once received and contemplated with perception, leads to the creation of the Universe.

=== Communism ===
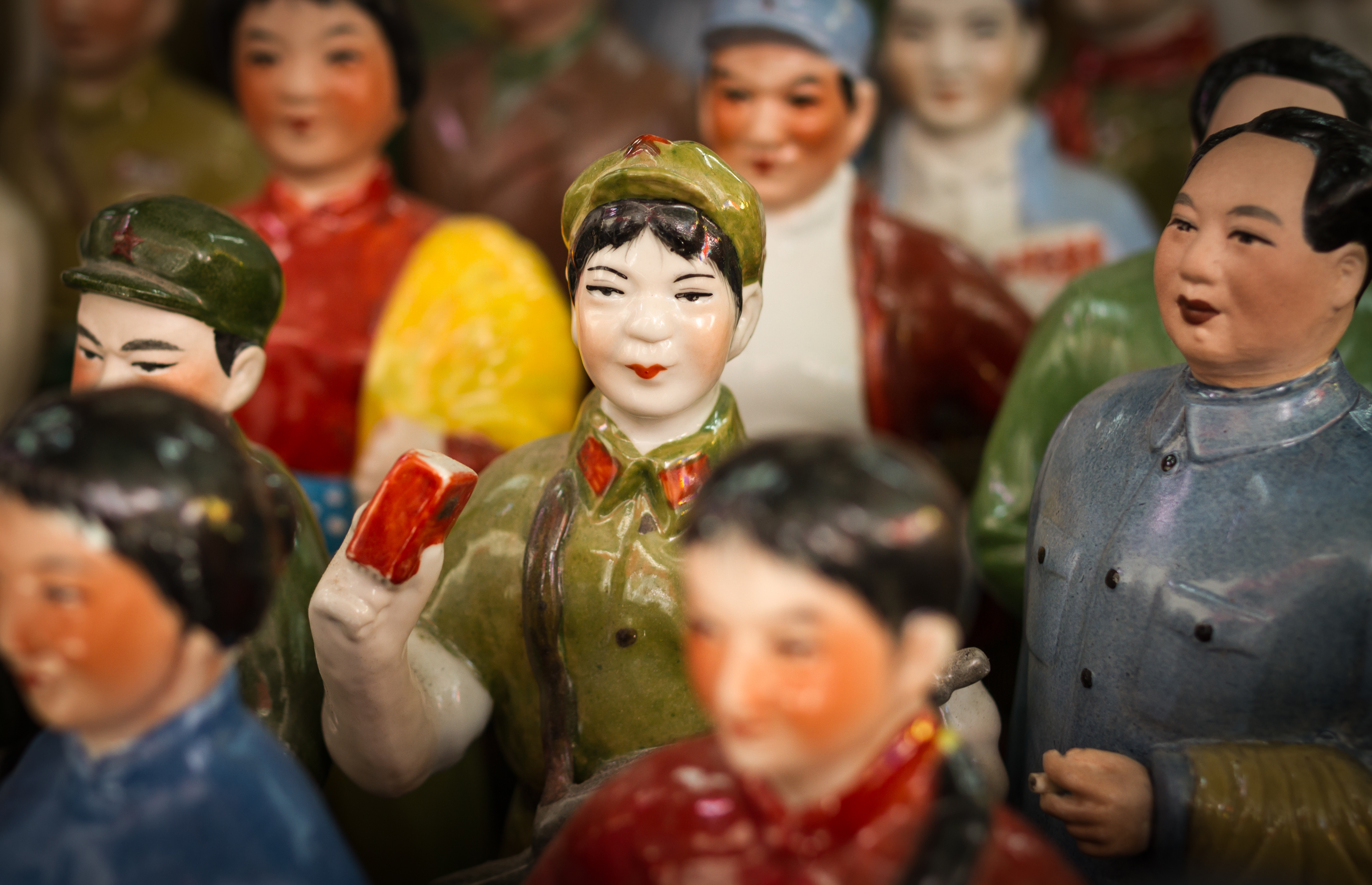
Porcelain statue of a woman in communist China - Cat Street Market, Hong Kong

Communist revolutionaries initially depicted idealized womanhood as muscular, plainly dressed and strong, with good female communists shown as undertaking hard manual labour, using guns, and eschewing self-adornment. Contemporary Western journalists portrayed communist states as the enemy of traditional femininity, describing women in communist countries as "mannish" perversions. In revolutionary China in the 1950s, Western journalists described Chinese women as "drably dressed, usually in sloppy slacks and without makeup, hair waves or nail polish" and wrote that "Glamour was communism's earliest victim in China. You can stroll the cheerless streets of Peking all day, without seeing a skirt or a sign of lipstick; without thrilling to the faintest breath of perfume; without hearing the click of high heels, or catching the glint of legs sheathed in nylon." In communist Poland, changing from high heels to worker's boots symbolized women's shift from the bourgeois to socialism."

Later, the initial state portrayals of idealized femininity as strong and hard-working began to also include more traditional notions such as gentleness, caring and nurturing behaviour, softness, modesty and moral virtue, requiring good communist women to become "superheroes who excelled in all spheres", including working at jobs not traditionally regarded as feminine in nature.

Communist ideology explicitly rejected some aspects of traditional femininity that it viewed as bourgeois and consumerist, such as helplessness, idleness and self-adornment. In Communist countries, some women resented not having access to cosmetics and fashionable clothes. In her 1993 book of essays How We Survived Communism & Even Laughed, Croatian journalist and novelist Slavenka Drakulic wrote about "a complaint I heard repeatedly from women in Warsaw, Budapest, Prague, Sofia, East Berlin: 'Look at us – we don't even look like women. There are no deodorants, perfumes, sometimes even no soap or toothpaste. There is no fine underwear, no pantyhose, no nice lingerie[']" and "Sometimes I think the real Iron Curtain is made of silky, shiny images of pretty women dressed in wonderful clothes, of pictures from women's magazines ... The images that cross the borders in magazines, movies or videos are therefore more dangerous than any secret weapon, because they make one desire that 'otherness' badly enough to risk one's life trying to escape."

As communist countries such as Romania and the Soviet Union began to liberalize, their official media began representing women in more conventionally feminine ways compared with the "rotund farm workers and plain-Jane factory hand" depictions they had previously been publishing. As perfumes, cosmetics, fashionable clothing, and footwear became available to ordinary women in the Soviet Union, East Germany, Poland, Yugoslavia and Hungary, they began to be presented not as bourgeois frivolities but as signs of socialist modernity. In China, with the economic liberation started by Deng Xiaoping in the 1980s, the state stopped discouraging women from expressing conventional femininity, and gender stereotypes and commercialized sexualization of women which had been suppressed under communist ideology began to rise.

== In intersex people ==
Intersex people have a wide variety of sex and gender identities. Some have a strong sense of feminine identity while others have a strong sense of masculine, mixed, neutral, or fluid gender identity, and these identities may be experienced across the many divergences of sexual difference. In a study with 69 intersex participants, 81% reported living in a female role, while 65% reported their gender identity was "as a woman," indicating that only some intersex people presenting as a woman actually identify as a woman. This relates to the report from over a quarter of participants that they feel "both male and female identification at different times," or "preferred an identity that was 'neither nor'" as well as the 26% who reported feeling uncertain about belonging to a specific gender.

== In men ==
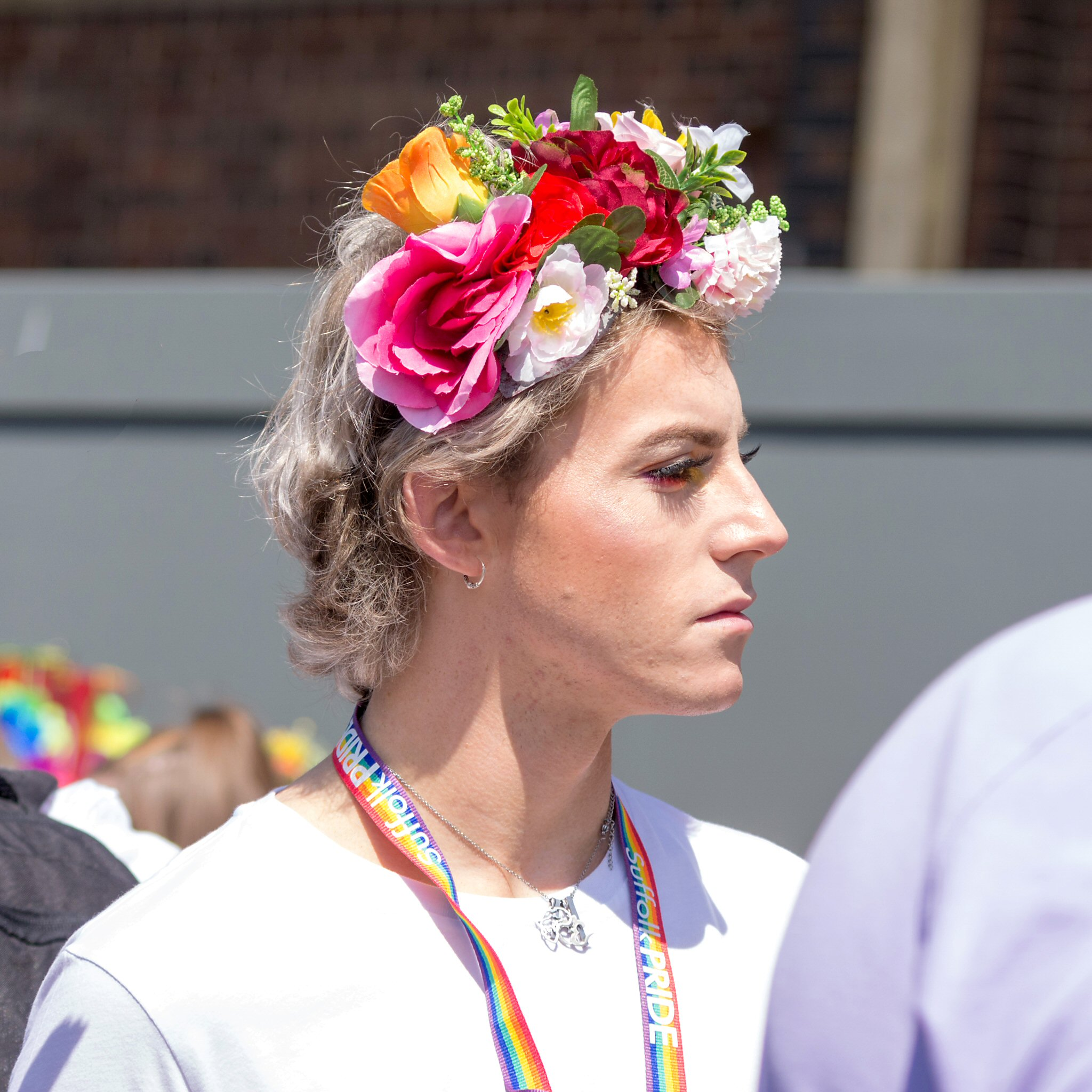
Flowers and makeup are stereotypically associated with femininity in Western culture.

In many cultures, men who display qualities considered feminine are often stigmatized and labeled as weak. Effeminate men are often associated with homosexuality, although femininity is not necessarily related to a man's sexual orientation. Because men are pressured to be masculine and heterosexual, feminine men are assumed to be gay or otherwise queer because of how they perform their gender. This assumption limits the way one is allowed to express one's gender and sexuality.

Cross-dressing and drag are two public performances of femininity by men that have been popularly known and understood throughout many western cultures. Men who wear clothing associated with femininity are often called cross-dressers. A drag queen is a man who wears flamboyant women's clothing and behaves in an exaggeratedly feminine manner for entertainment purposes.

== In transgender people ==
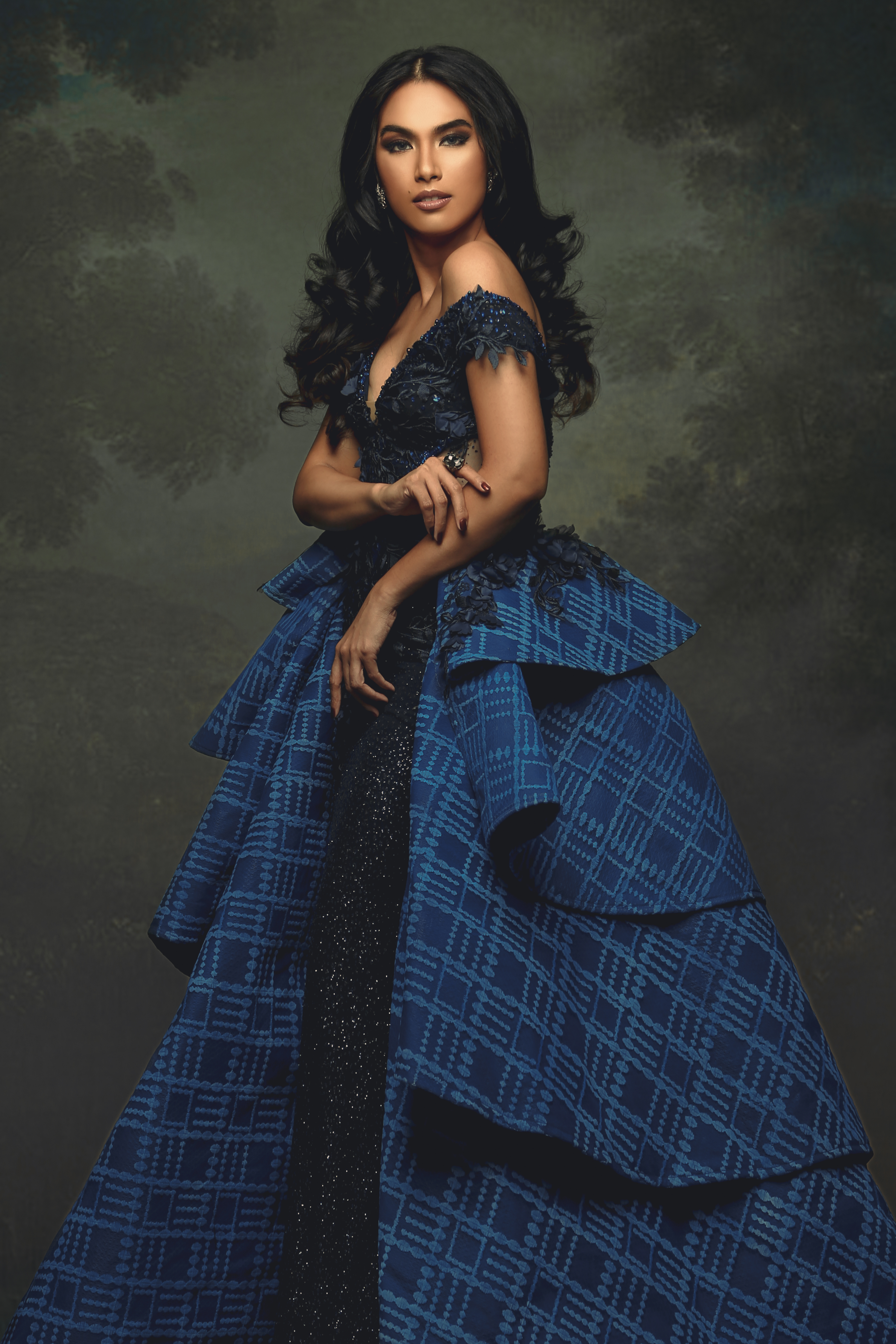
Mela Habijan, the 2020 winner of the Miss Trans Global contest

Transgender people may also embody femininity as part of their gender identity and expression.

Like all women, trans women vary greatly in style and expression and may identify with conventional feminine presentations, queer forms such as femme dykes or femme tomboys, or with androgynous expressions. Their experiences with femininity often feature aspects of self-determination and self-empowerment in response to transphobia and misogyny as well as hostility from trans-exclusionary radical feminists. Like cisgender women, transgender women may use cosmetics and medical procedures to amplify their feminine characteristics, as well as gender-affirming health care, voice and nonverbal communication therapies, to improve their well-being and quality of life.

While many trans men seek to convey a masculine presentation, they may still choose to embody and practice feminine qualities and behaviors and regard femininity as less of a linear opposition to their masculinity. For example, trans men leaders may draw on relational skills and have increased sensitivity to the nuances of sexism in the workplace due to previous life experiences when they presented more feminine. In a study with 100 trans masculine and 100 cisgender men, the trans masculine participants were less impacted by threats to their masculinity, while cisgender men showed higher endorsement of some masculine norms such as heterosexual presentations and power over women. Trans men may face discrimination or stereotyping related to femininity; one study found that shorter and more feminine trans men were more likely to be harassed as gay.

== Feminist views ==
Feminist philosophers such as Judith Butler and Simone de Beauvoir contend that femininity and masculinity are created through repeated performances of gender; these performances reproduce and define the traditional categories of sex and/or gender.

Many second-wave feminists reject what they regard as constricting standards of female beauty, created for the subordination and objectifying of women and self-perpetuated by reproductive competition and women's own aesthetics.

Others, such as lipstick feminists and some other third-wave feminists, argue that feminism should not devalue feminine culture and identity, and that symbols of feminine identity such as make-up, suggestive clothing and having a sexual allure can be valid and empowering personal choices for both sexes.

Julia Serano notes that masculine girls and women face much less social disapproval than feminine boys and men, which she attributes to sexism. Serano argues that women wanting to be like men is consistent with the idea that maleness is more valued in contemporary culture than femaleness, whereas men being willing to give up masculinity in favour of femininity directly threatens the notion of male superiority as well as the idea that men and women should be opposites. To support her thesis, Serano cites the far greater public scrutiny and disdain experienced by male-to-female cross-dressers compared with that faced by women who dress in masculine clothes, as well as research showing that parents are likelier to respond negatively to sons who like Barbie dolls and ballet or wear nail polish than they are to daughters exhibiting comparably masculine behaviours. Serano notes that some behaviors, such as frequent smiling or avoiding eye contact with strangers, are considered feminine because they are practised disproportionately by women, and likely have resulted from women's attempts to negotiate through a world which is sometimes hostile to them.

== See also ==
- Butch and femme
- Effeminacy
- Femboy
- Feminine beauty ideal
- Feminine psychology
- Feminism
- Feminization (sociology)
- Gender expression
- Gender identity
- Gender role
- Gender studies
- Girly girl
- Lipstick feminism
- Lipstick lesbian
- Marianismo
- Masculinity
- Nature versus nurture
- Otokonoko
- Sex–gender distinction
- Social construction of gender
- Sociology of gender
- Transfeminine
