= Tim Duncan =

American basketball player (born 1976)

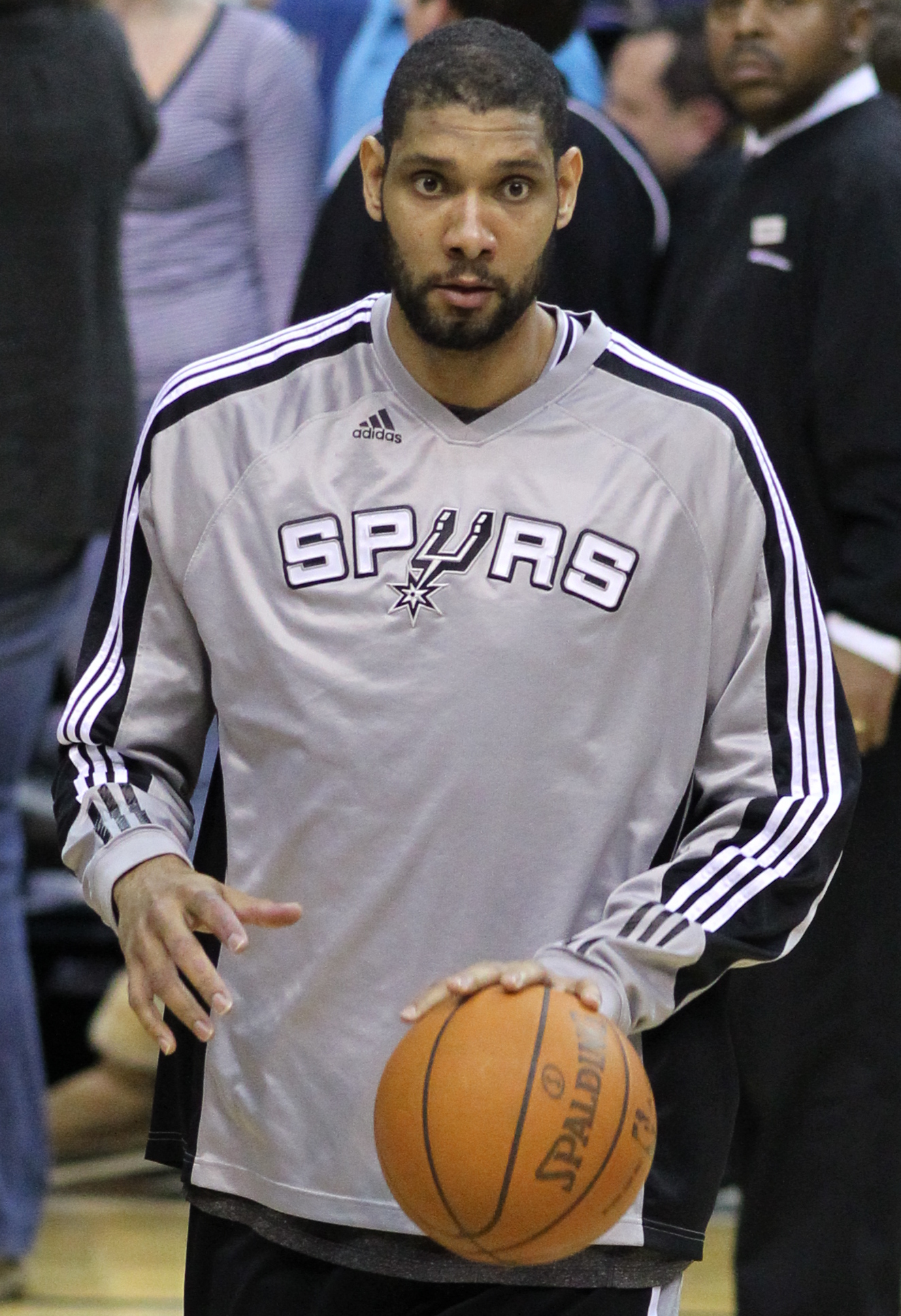
- Duncan with the San Antonio Spurs in 2011

Personal information
- Born: April 25, 1976 (age 50) Saint Croix, U.S. Virgin Islands
- Listed height: 6 ft 11 in (2.11 m)
- Listed weight: 250 lb (113 kg)

Career information
- High school: St. Dunstan's Episcopal (Saint Croix, U.S. Virgin Islands)
- College: Wake Forest (1993–1997)
- NBA draft: 1997: 1st round, 1st overall pick
- Drafted by: San Antonio Spurs
- Playing career: 1997–2016
- Position: Power forward / center
- Number: 21
- Coaching career: 2019–2020

Career history

Playing
- 1997–2016: San Antonio Spurs

Coaching
- 2019–2020: San Antonio Spurs (assistant)

Career highlights
- 5× NBA champion (1999, 2003, 2005, 2007, 2014); 3× NBA Finals MVP (1999, 2003, 2005); 2× NBA Most Valuable Player (2002, 2003); 15× NBA All-Star (1998, 2000–2011, 2013, 2015); NBA All-Star Game co-MVP (Note: along with Shaquille O'Neal) (2000); 10× All-NBA First Team (1998–2005, 2007, 2013); 3× All-NBA Second Team (2006, 2008, 2009); 2× All-NBA Third Team (2010, 2015); 8× NBA All-Defensive First Team (1999–2003, 2005, 2007, 2008); 7× NBA All-Defensive Second Team (1998, 2004, 2006, 2009, 2010, 2013, 2015); NBA Rookie of the Year (1998); NBA All-Rookie First Team (1998); NBA 75th Anniversary Team; No. 21 retired by San Antonio Spurs; USA Basketball Male Athlete of the Year (2003); Sports Illustrated Sportsman of the Year (2003); National college player of the year (1997); 2× Consensus first-team All-American (1996, 1997); Chip Hilton Player of the Year (1997); 3× NABC Defensive Player of the Year (1995–1997); NCAA rebounding leader (1997); ACC Athlete of the Year (1997); 2× ACC Player of the Year (1996, 1997); 3× First-team All-ACC (1995–1997); No. 21 retired by Wake Forest Demon Deacons

Career statistics
- Points: 26,496 (19.0 ppg)
- Rebounds: 15,091 (10.8 rpg)
- Blocks: 3,020 (2.2 bpg)
- Stats at NBA.com
- Stats at Basketball Reference
- Basketball Hall of Fame
- Collegiate Basketball Hall of Fame
Medals
Men's basketball
Representing the United States
Olympic Games
Bronze medal – third place	2004 Athens	Team
FIBA Americas Championship
Gold medal – first place	1999 San Juan	Team
Gold medal – first place	2003 San Juan	Team
Goodwill Games
Bronze medal – third place	1994 St. Petersburg	Team
Summer Universiade
Gold medal – first place	1995 Fukuoka	Team

Timothy Theodore Duncan (born April 25, 1976) is an American former professional basketball player and coach who spent his entire 19-year career with the San Antonio Spurs in the National Basketball Association (NBA). Nicknamed "the Big Fundamental", he is widely considered the greatest power forward of all time and one of the greatest players in NBA history, and was a central contributor to the franchise's success during the 2000s and 2010s. He was inducted into the Naismith Memorial Basketball Hall of Fame in 2020 and named to the NBA 75th Anniversary Team in 2021.

Born and raised on Saint Croix in the U.S. Virgin Islands, Duncan initially aspired to be a competitive swimmer, but took up basketball at 14 after Hurricane Hugo destroyed the island's only Olympic-sized pool. In high school, he played basketball for St. Dunstan's Episcopal. In college, Duncan played for the Wake Forest Demon Deacons, and in his senior year, he received the John Wooden Award and was named the Naismith College Player of the Year and the USBWA College Player of the Year.

After graduating from college, Duncan was the NBA Rookie of the Year after being selected by San Antonio with the first overall pick in the 1997 NBA draft. In his second season, he became the third player (alongside Magic Johnson and Kareem Abdul-Jabbar) to win NBA Finals MVP in his first two seasons after being drafted, guiding the Spurs to the 1999 NBA title. A strong post defender, Duncan was named to one of the two All-Defensive teams in each of his first 13 seasons, an NBA record. As part of the Spurs' Big Three with guards Tony Parker and Manu Ginóbili, Duncan won four more NBA championships and collected three Finals MVP trophies. He primarily played the power forward position, but also played center throughout his career. He is a five-time NBA champion, a two-time NBA MVP, a three-time NBA Finals MVP, a 15-time NBA All-Star, and the only player to be chosen for the All-NBA and All-Defensive Teams for 13 consecutive seasons.

== Early life ==
Duncan was born on April 25, 1976, and raised in Saint Croix, U.S. Virgin Islands. He is the son of immigrants from Anguilla: Ione, a professional midwife, and William Duncan, a mason. He has two older sisters, Cheryl and Tricia, and an older brother, Scott, who became a film director and cinematographer for Survivor. Cheryl was a champion swimmer before she became a nurse, and Tricia swam for the U.S. Virgin Islands at the 1988 Summer Olympics in Seoul.

In school, Duncan was a bright pupil and dreamt of becoming an Olympic-level swimmer like Tricia. His parents were very supportive, and Duncan excelled at swimming, becoming a teenage standout in the 50-, 100-, and 400-meter freestyle and aiming to go to the 1992 Olympic Games as a member of the United States Team.

In 1989, after Hurricane Hugo destroyed the island's only Olympic-sized swimming pool, Duncan was forced to swim in the ocean instead, and his fear of sharks ruined his enthusiasm for the sport. He was dealt another emotional blow when his mother died of breast cancer on April 24, 1990, the day before his 14th birthday. On her deathbed, she made Duncan and his sisters promise that they would graduate from college, which played a part in Duncan's later refusal to leave college early for the NBA.

Duncan never swam competitively again, but his brother-in-law inspired him to turn to basketball. Initially, Duncan had difficulties adapting to the game he thought would help relieve his pain and frustration. St. Croix Country Day School athletic director Nancy Pomroy said Duncan "was so huge. So big and tall, but he was awfully awkward at the time." He overcame his awkwardness to become a standout for the St. Dunstan's Episcopal High School, averaging 25 points per game as a senior. His play attracted the attention of several universities. Wake Forest University basketball coach Dave Odom, in particular, grew interested in Duncan after the 16-year-old allegedly played NBA star Alonzo Mourning to a draw in a 5-on-5 pick-up game. Odom was searching for a tall, physical player to play near the basket. Given the weak level of basketball in the Virgin Islands, Odom was wary about Duncan at first, especially after first meeting him and thinking him inattentive; Duncan stared blankly at Odom for most of the conversation. But after the first talk, Odom understood that this was just Duncan's demeanor and discovered that he was not only a talented athlete but also a quick learner. Eventually, despite scholarship offers by the University of Hartford, the University of Delaware, and Providence College, Duncan joined Odom's Wake Forest Demon Deacons.

== College career ==
In the year before Duncan's arrival at Wake Forest University, the Demon Deacons had reached the Sweet 16, but then lost leading scorer Rodney Rogers, who entered the 1993 NBA draft. In the 1993–94 NCAA season, Coach Dave Odom was considering redshirting Duncan, but was forced to play him after fellow freshman big man Makhtar N'Diaye violated NCAA rules and eventually transferred to Michigan. Duncan wore No. 21 at Wake Forest in honor of his brother-in-law, Ricky Lowery, who had taught him to play basketball and had worn the same number when he was in college. He would continue to wear this number throughout his entire professional career. Duncan struggled with early transition problems and was even held scoreless in his first college game, but as the year progressed, he and teammate Randolph Childress led the Deacons to a 20–11 win–loss record. Duncan's style of play was simple yet effective, combining an array of low-post moves, mid-range bank shots, and tough defense. He was chosen to represent the U.S. in the 1994 Goodwill Games. Meanwhile, Duncan worked towards a degree in psychology and also took classes in anthropology and Chinese literature. Despite his heavy focus on basketball, Wake Forest psychology department chairperson Deborah Best said he "was one of my more intellectual students. ... Other than his height, I couldn't tell him from any other student at Wake Forest." Duncan also established his reputation as a stoic player, to the extent that opposing fans taunted him as "Mr. Spock", the prototype of a logical, detached character from Star Trek.

In the 1994–95 NCAA season, the sophomore was soon called one of the best prospects among those eligible for the NBA, along with peers Joe Smith, Rasheed Wallace, and Jerry Stackhouse. Los Angeles Lakers general manager Jerry West suggested that Duncan might become the top pick in the 1995 NBA draft if he went early; however, Duncan said that he had no intention of going pro before graduation, despite the NBA's plan to add a rookie salary cap in 1996. Though it meant passing up a large amount of money, Duncan was loath to deviate from his determination to stay in school. In that season, he led the Demon Deacons into the Atlantic Coast Conference (ACC) championship game against the Rasheed Wallace-led North Carolina Tar Heels. During that game, Duncan neutralized Wallace, while Childress sealed the win with a jump shot with four seconds left in overtime. In the NCAA tournament, the Demon Deacons reached the Sweet 16. Playing against Oklahoma State, Duncan scored 12 points to go with 22 rebounds and eight blocks, outplaying Bryant Reeves, but Wake Forest still lost, 71–66. Duncan ended the season averaging 16.8 points and 12.5 rebounds per game, was named Defensive Player of the Year, and became the third-best shot-blocker in NCAA history with 3.98 blocks per game. He was also voted All-ACC First Team, a feat he would repeat in his two remaining years at Wake Forest.

During the 1995–96 NCAA season, Wake Forest lost Childress, who had graduated the previous season and entered the NBA. In Childress's absence, Duncan led the team to a 12–4 ACC record, and a 26–6 record overall. The Demon Deacons won the ACC Finals again, but in the Sweet 16, Duncan came down with the flu, and his team missed the Final Four. His season averages of 19.1 points and 12.3 rebounds per game led to another ACC Defensive Player of the Year award and his first ACC Player of the Year award. Although the Wake Forest star was now rumored to be entering the 1996 NBA draft, he stayed in college.

In the 1996–97 NCAA season, new 7 ft 1 in (2.16 m) Demon Deacon and future NBA player Loren Woods eased the pressure on Duncan close to the basket. The 1996–97 team won their first 13 games, but then came a slump, and they failed to win a third ACC title. On January 12, 1997, Duncan scored 26 points and 14 rebounds in an 81–69 win against Duke. On January 24, 1997, Duncan scored 16 points, 15 rebounds and 5 blocks in a 65–62 victory over Clemson. Later, during the NCAA tournament, Stanford University, led by future NBA point guard Brevin Knight, eliminated Wake Forest with a 72–66 win. Duncan finished his senior season with career high averages of 20.8 points, 14.7 rebounds and 3.2 assists per game while shooting .606 from the field and winning the Defensive Player of the Year for a third straight season. He earned first-team All-American honors for the second time and was a unanimous pick for both the Oscar Robertson Trophy and Naismith College Player of the Year. Duncan was first in the 1996–97 NCAA Division I in rebounding, tenth in blocked shots (3.3 bpg), and 28th in scoring (20.8 ppg). He was voted ACC Player of the Year again and, based on the votes of sportscasters and newswriters, won the 1997 John Wooden Award as the NCAA's best overall male player.

In contrast to contemporary prep-to-pro players like Kevin Garnett, Jermaine O'Neal, Tracy McGrady, and Kobe Bryant, Duncan stayed in college for a full four years. During that period, he was a two-time ACC Player of the Year and a three-time NABC Defensive Player of the Year. The center also made the All-ACC Tournament between 1995 and 1997 and the All-ACC First Team between 1995 and 1997. In 1996, he led the ACC in scoring, rebounding, field goal percentage, and blocked shots, becoming the first player in conference history to lead all four of those categories. That same year, he was also named Most Valuable Player of the ACC Tournament. Overall, Duncan led his team to a 97–31 win–loss record and finished his college career as the all-time leading rebounder in NCAA history in the post-1973 era (a mark later surpassed by Kenneth Faried). Duncan left college as the all-time leading shot-blocker in ACC history with 481 blocks—at the time second in NCAA annals behind Colgate's Adonal Foyle—and third on the ACC career rebounding list with 1,570 rebounds. He is also tied with Armando Bacot for the second-most double-doubles in NCAA history with 87.

In college, Duncan co-authored a chapter in the social psychology book Aversive Interpersonal Behaviors with Mark Leary. After earning his college degree in psychology, Duncan entered the 1997 NBA draft. In 2009, Duncan was inducted into the Wake Forest Sports Hall of Fame.

== Professional career ==
=== San Antonio Spurs (1997–2016) ===
==== "Twin Towers" (1997–2003) ====
In the 1997 NBA draft, the San Antonio Spurs drafted Duncan with the first draft pick. The Spurs were coming off an injury-riddled 1996–97 season; their best player, David Robinson—himself a number one draft pick in 1987—was sidelined for most of the year, and they finished with a 20–62 win–loss record. In the 1997–98 season, Duncan and Robinson became known as the "Twin Towers". The duo earned a reputation for their exceptional defense close to the basket. From the beginning, Duncan established himself as a quality player: In his second road game, he grabbed 22 rebounds against Chicago Bulls Hall-of-Fame power forward Dennis Rodman, a multiple rebounding champion and NBA Defensive Player of the Year. Duncan was voted to the 1998 NBA All-Star Game by coaches. Later, when Duncan played against Houston Rockets Hall-of-Fame power forward Charles Barkley, Barkley was so impressed he said, "I have seen the future and he wears number 21." In his rookie season, Duncan lived up to expectations of being the first draft pick, starting in all 82 regular season games, averaging 21.1 points, 11.9 rebounds, 2.7 assists and 2.5 blocks per game, and earning All-NBA First Team honors. His defensive contributions ensured that he was chosen for the NBA All-Defensive Second Team and was also named NBA Rookie of the Year, having won the NBA Rookie of the Month award every single month that season. Spurs coach Gregg Popovich lauded Duncan's mental toughness, stating his rookie's "demeanor was singularly remarkable", Duncan always "put things into perspective" and never got "too upbeat or too depressed." Center Robinson was equally impressed with Duncan: "He's the real thing. I'm proud of his attitude and effort. He gives all the extra effort and work and wants to become a better player."

The Spurs qualified for the 1998 NBA playoffs as the fifth seed, but Duncan had a bad first half in his first playoff game against the Phoenix Suns, causing Suns coach Danny Ainge to play Duncan with less defensive pressure. The rookie capitalized on this by finishing Game 1 with 32 points and 10 rebounds and replicating the performance in Game 2, contributing to a 3–1 victory over the Suns. However, the Spurs lost in the second round to the eventual Western Conference champions, Utah Jazz.

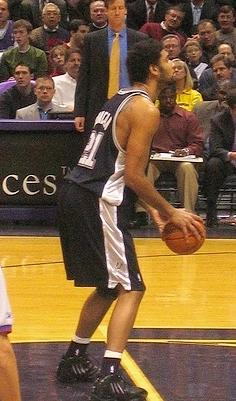
Duncan at the free throw line in 2005

During the lockout-shortened 1998–99 season, the Spurs started with a lackluster 6–8 record and Popovich came under fire from the press. However, Duncan and Robinson stood behind their coach and finished the season with a 31–5 run. The sophomore averaged 21.7 points, 11.4 rebounds, 2.4 assists and 2.5 blocks in the regular season, making both the All-NBA and All-Defense First Teams. In the 1999 NBA playoffs, the Spurs defeated the Minnesota Timberwolves 3–1, swept the Los Angeles Lakers and the Portland Trail Blazers 4–0, and defeated the Cinderella New York Knicks 4–1 in the Finals. In this series, a large contingent of Virgin Islanders flew over to support their local hero, and were not disappointed. In the first two games, the "Twin Towers" outscored their Knicks counterparts Chris Dudley/Larry Johnson with 41 points, 26 rebounds, and nine blocks versus five points, 12 rebounds, and zero blocks. After a Game 3 loss in which Duncan was held scoreless in the third quarter and committed three turnovers in the last quarter, Duncan bounced back with 28 points and 18 rebounds in a Game 4 win, and in Game 5, the Spurs protected a 78–77 lead seconds from the end with the ball in the Knicks' possession. Double teamed by Duncan and Robinson, Knicks swingman Latrell Sprewell missed a last-second desperation shot, and after closing out the series with a strong 31-point, 9-rebound showing in Game 5, Duncan was named Finals MVP, bringing San Antonio their first-ever NBA championship. Sports Illustrated journalist and retired NBA player Alex English added: "Duncan came up big each time they went to him with that sweet turnaround jumper off the glass. He was the man tonight [in Game 5]." And Popovich later said to losing coach Jeff Van Gundy: "I've got Tim and you don't. That's the difference."

In the 1999–2000 season, Duncan further cemented his reputation. He averaged 23.2 points, 12.4 rebounds, 3.2 assists and 2.2 blocks per game, earning another pair of All-NBA and All-Defense First Team nods. However, the Spurs had a disappointing postseason. Duncan injured his meniscus shortly before the end of the regular season and was unable to play in even one postseason game. Consequently, the Spurs were eliminated in the first round of the 2000 NBA playoffs, losing 3–1 to the Phoenix Suns. The following offseason, Duncan nearly joined the Orlando Magic in free agency, but stayed with the Spurs after Magic coach Doc Rivers refused to allow Duncan to bring his family to fly on the team plane.

In the next season, Duncan averaged 22.2 points, 12.2 rebounds, 3.0 assists, and 2.3 blocks per game. He was again named to the All-NBA and All-Defensive First Teams. In the 2001 NBA playoffs, the Spurs eliminated the Timberwolves 3–1, defeated the Dallas Mavericks 4–1, but then bowed out against the Lakers (led by superstars Shaquille O'Neal and Kobe Bryant) in four straight games. Sports Illustrated described the series as a "[m]erciless mismatch", and Duncan was criticized as "silent when the Spurs need him most".

On the back of two consecutive playoff disappointments, Duncan improved statistically in the 2001–02 season. He averaged career highs in scoring (25.5 points per game, including a league-leading 764 field goals and 560 attempted free throws) and rebounding (12.7 boards per game, and his accumulated 1,042 boards again led the league), and also averaged 3.7 assists and 2.5 blocks per game, both career highs. Coupled with another pair of All-NBA and All-Defensive First Team nods, he was named the league's Most Valuable Player, joining teammate David Robinson as one of only two Spurs players in history to have earned the honor. On the other hand, Duncan's team struggled with the fact that the aging Robinson was no longer able to sustain his level of performance, and backup center-forward Malik Rose had to step in more often. In the 2002 NBA playoffs, the Spurs were again outmatched by the Lakers. Up against star center O'Neal once more, the Spurs were defeated 4–1 by the eventual champions. Duncan, who managed 34 points and a franchise-high 25 rebounds in Game 5, stated his frustration: "I thought we really had a chance at this series. The Lakers proved to be more than we could handle. Again, we had a (heck) of a run at it. We had opportunities to win games and make it a different series, but that's just the way the ball rolls sometimes." Nevertheless, NBA.com praised Duncan as "phenomenal" and criticized his supporting cast.

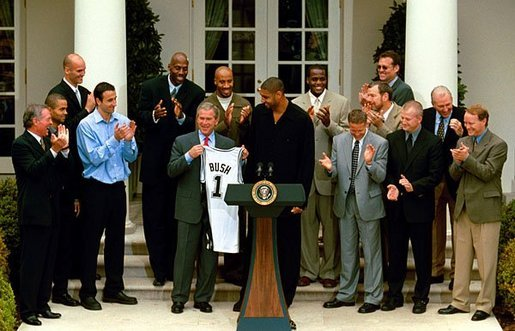
Duncan (middle) and the Spurs at the White House after winning the 2003 NBA Finals

In the 2002–03 season, the Spurs began play at the SBC Center on November 1 by defeating the Toronto Raptors 91–72. In that game, Duncan recorded 22 points, 15 rebounds and 3 blocks for the Spurs. He averaged 23.3 points, a career-high 12.9 rebounds, 3.9 assists and 2.9 blocks per game, and earned All-NBA and All-Defensive First Team recognition, resulting in his second NBA Most Valuable Player Award. At age 37, Robinson had announced that the season would be his last; his playing time was cut by coach Popovich to save his energy for the playoffs. The Spurs qualified easily for the playoffs, concluding the regular season as the Western Conference's number one seed with a 60–22 record. In the Western Conference Semifinals against the Lakers, Duncan dominated forward Robert Horry and closed out the series in style; Duncan finished Game 6 with 37 points and 16 rebounds. The Spurs made it to the finals, and defeated the New Jersey Nets 88–77 in Game 6 to win another NBA championship. Helped by an inspired Robinson, Duncan almost recorded a quadruple double in the final game, and was named the NBA Finals MVP. Following this successful Spurs campaign, Robinson and Duncan were named Sports Illustrated's 2003 "Sportsmen of the Year".

==== Leader of the Spurs (2003–2007) ====
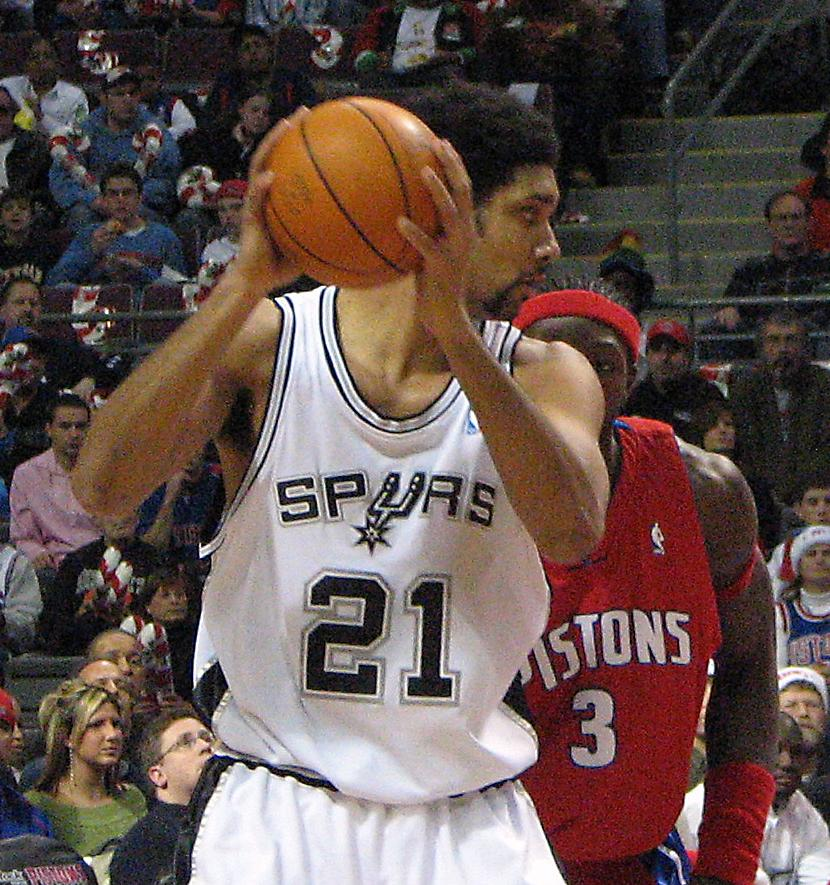
Duncan backing down Ben Wallace in a 2005 game

On July 16, 2003, Duncan signed a seven-year, $122 million contract with the Spurs. Before the 2003–04 season began, the Spurs lost their perennial captain David Robinson to retirement. Embracing the lone team leader role, Duncan led a reformed Spurs team which included Slovenian center Rasho Nesterović, defensive stalwart Bruce Bowen, Argentinian shooting guard Manu Ginóbili and young French point guard Tony Parker. Coming off the bench were clutch shooting power forward Robert Horry, versatile Hedo Türkoğlu and veterans Malik Rose and Kevin Willis. In retrospect, Robinson commented that at first, Duncan was reluctant to step into the void, still needing some time to truly develop his leadership skills. Statistically though, Duncan remained strong; after another convincing season with averages of 22.3 points, 12.4 rebounds, 3.1 assists and 2.7 blocks, he led the Spurs into the Western Conference Semifinals. There, they met the Los Angeles Lakers again, split the series 2–2, and in Game 5, Duncan made a toughly defended jump shot which put the Spurs ahead by one point with 0.4 seconds left to play. Despite the little time remaining, Lakers point guard Derek Fisher hit a buzzer beater, giving his team the win. In the end, the Spurs lost the series 4–2, and Duncan attributed the strong Lakers defense as one of the reasons for the loss.

Duncan and his Spurs looked to re-assert themselves in the next 2004–05 season. Despite their new captain's slight statistical slump (20.3 points, 11.1 rebounds, 2.7 assists, 2.6 blocks per game), the Spurs won the second seed for the 2005 NBA playoffs by winning 59 games. In the first round, the Spurs eliminated the Denver Nuggets four games to one, and met the Seattle SuperSonics in the semi-finals. After splitting the first four games, Duncan led his team to two decisive victories, setting up a meeting with the Phoenix Suns, known for their up-tempo basketball. The Spurs managed to beat the Suns at their own game, defeating them 4–1 and earning a spot in the 2005 NBA Finals against the Detroit Pistons. In the Finals, Duncan was pitted against Detroit's defensively strong frontcourt anchored by multiple NBA Defensive Player of the Year Ben Wallace. After two convincing Game 1 and 2 wins for the Spurs, the Pistons double teamed Duncan and forced him to play further from the basket. Detroit won the next two games and the series was eventually tied at 3–3, but Duncan was instrumental in Game 7, recording 25 points and 11 rebounds as the Spurs defeated the Pistons. NBA.com reported that "with his unique multidimensional talent, Duncan depleted and dissected the Pistons... He was the fulcrum of virtually every key play down the stretch", and coach Popovich added: "[Duncan's] complete game is so sound, so fundamental, so unnoticed at times, because if he didn't score, people think, 'Well, he didn't do anything'. But he was incredible and he was the force that got it done for us." Pistons center Ben Wallace remarked: "He put his team on his shoulders and carried them to a championship. That's what the great players do." Duncan won his third NBA Finals MVP Award, joining Michael Jordan, Shaquille O'Neal, and Magic Johnson as the only players in NBA history to win it three times.

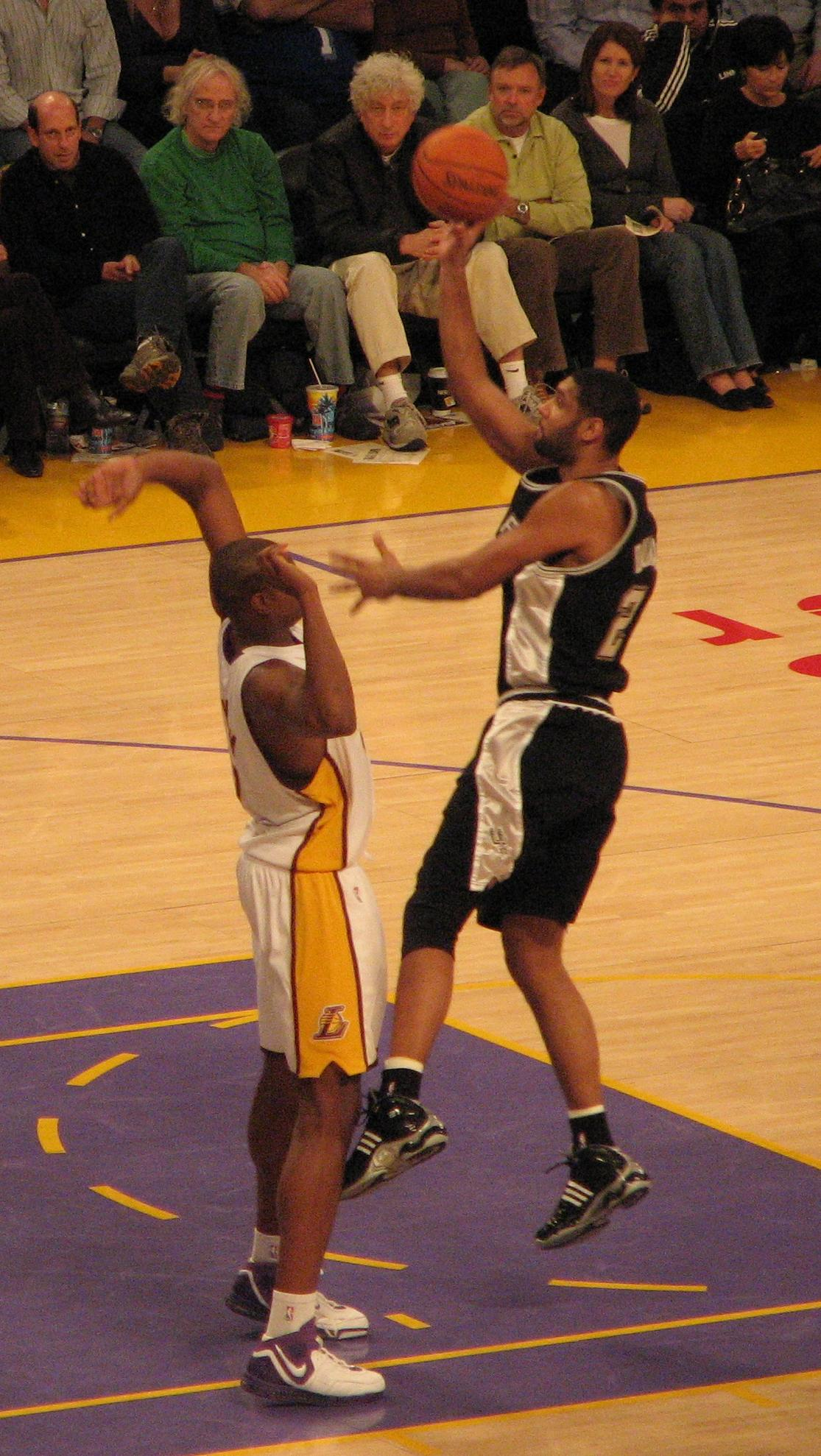
Duncan going up for a shot over the Lakers' Andrew Bynum

During the 2005–06 season, Duncan suffered from plantar fasciitis for most of the season, which was at least partly responsible for his sinking output (18.6 points, 11.0 rebounds, 3.2 assists and 2.0 blocks per game), and also for his failure to make the All-NBA First Team after eight consecutive appearances. The big man came back strong in the 2006 NBA playoffs against the Dallas Mavericks, where he outscored rival power forward Dirk Nowitzki 32.2 to 27.1 points, with neither Nowitzki nor Mavericks center Erick Dampier able to stop Duncan with their man-to-man defense. But after splitting the first six games, Duncan became the tragic hero of his team in Game 7. Despite scoring 39 points in regulation time and fouling out both Dampier and Keith Van Horn, Duncan only made one of seven field goal attempts in overtime against Mavericks reserve center DeSagana Diop, and the Spurs lost Game 7.

The following season, however, was another championship year for Duncan and the Spurs. Duncan averaged 20.0 points, 10.6 rebounds, 3.4 assists and 2.4 blocks per game in the regular season, and was selected as a Western Conference starter for the 2007 NBA All-Star Game, his ninth appearance in the event. In the 2007 NBA Playoffs, he led the Spurs to a 4–1 series win over the Denver Nuggets in the opening round, a 4–2 win over the Phoenix Suns in the second round, and a 4–1 win against the Utah Jazz in the Western Conference Finals, setting up a meeting with the Cleveland Cavaliers in the Finals. There, the Spurs swept the Cavaliers 4–0, earning Duncan his and San Antonio's fourth ever championship. Duncan proclaimed that that championship was "the best" of his four championships; however, he also acknowledged he played "sub-par" and thus received only one vote for NBA Finals MVP from a panel of ten. His colleagues were more appreciative of Duncan; among others, ex-teammate David Robinson referred to the Spurs titles as the "Tim Duncan era", and lauded his leadership. Coach Popovich also praised Duncan: "Tim is the common denominator. He's [had] a different cast around him [in] '99, '03 and '05. He's welcomed them all. ... But he is that easy to play with, and his skills are so fundamentally sound that other people can fit in." Then-NBA commissioner David Stern added: "[Duncan] is a player for the ages. I'm a tennis fan, and Pete Sampras is one of the greats. OK, he wasn't Andre Agassi or John McEnroe. He just happens to be one of the greatest players of all time. You take great players as you find them."

==== Playoff disappointments (2007–2013) ====
During the 2008 NBA All-Star Weekend, Duncan was a member of the San Antonio team that won the Shooting Stars Competition. For the season, he played 78 games and posted his typical 20/10 numbers, San Antonio concluded the 2007–08 regular season with a 56–26 record, finishing behind the Lakers and New Orleans Hornets in the Western Conference and setting themselves up for a first-round contest against the Suns. The Suns—defeated by the Spurs in three of the past four seasons of playoffs—were out for revenge and featured a new player in four-time NBA champion Shaquille O'Neal. In Game 1, Duncan set the tone with a 40-point game and a rare three-pointer that sent the game into double overtime. The trio of Duncan, Ginóbili and Parker continued playing to form for the remainder of the series, and the Spurs eliminated the Suns in five games. In the first game of the next round against the Chris Paul-led Hornets, San Antonio was badly defeated 101–82 as Duncan played one of the worst playoff games in his career, recording only 5 points and 3 rebounds. The Spurs dropped the next game as well, but recovered in Games 3 and 4, with Duncan putting up a team-high 22 point/15 rebound/4 block performance in the game that tied the series. Duncan then recorded 20 points and 15 rebounds in Game 6, and the Spurs relied on their experience to seal the series in Game 7. However, arch-rivals Los Angeles Lakers defeated San Antonio in five games in the Conference Finals, and the Spurs once again failed to capture back-to-back NBA championships.

Duncan started the 2008–09 season with strong showings in points and rebounds per game. However, by mid-season, his performance declined and he was subsequently diagnosed with chronic knee tendinosis. Despite Duncan having problems with his knee and the team losing the services of shooting guard Ginóbili for most of the season, San Antonio qualified for the playoffs as the third seed with a 54–28 record. Coupled with an aging supporting cast (Bowen, Michael Finley and Kurt Thomas were all in their late 30s), however, the Spurs were only considered fringe contenders for the championship. As it turned out, Duncan and Parker were not enough to help the Spurs avoid a 4–1 defeat by Dallas, and the Spurs were eliminated in the first round of the playoffs for the first time since 2000.

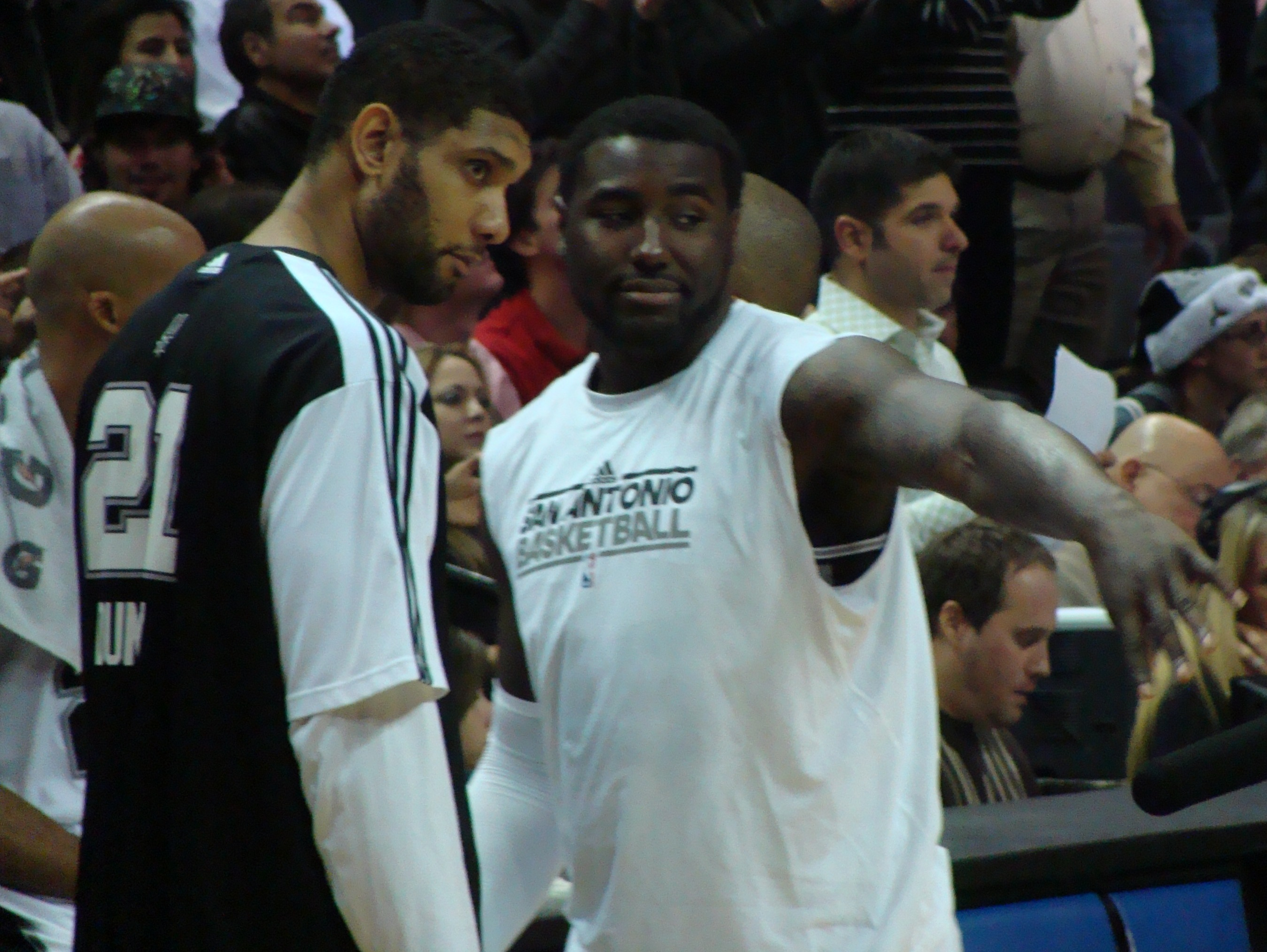
Duncan and DeJuan Blair in 2010

With the Spurs looking to provide a more solid supporting cast in the 2009–10 season, they acquired Richard Jefferson, Theo Ratliff, Antonio McDyess, DeJuan Blair, and Keith Bogans. The team got off to a 5–6 start, but a series of double-double performances by Duncan gave them a 9–6 record by the end of November. Duncan was subsequently named the Western Conference Player of the Week for the last week of November. Even at 34 years of age, he remained a constant 20–10 threat, being only one of three players in the league at the mid-season to average at least 20 points and 10 rebounds a game. On January 21, 2010, Duncan was named as the starting forward for the West for the 2010 NBA All-Star Game. After securing yet another 50-win season, the Spurs qualified for the playoffs as the seventh seed, and defeated Dallas 4–2 in the first round, only to lose 4–0 to Phoenix in the next round.

Eleven games into the 2010–11 season, Duncan became the Spurs' all-time leader in points scored and games played. Along the way, the Spurs compiled a 12-game winning streak to go 13–2 after 15 games. On November 30, 2010, Duncan recorded his third career triple-double against the Golden State Warriors. 12 days later, in a game against the Portland Trail Blazers, Duncan became the 94th player in NBA history to play 1,000 games. Through his 1,000th game, the Spurs have been 707–293; only Scottie Pippen (715–285) had a better record with his team through his first 1,000 games. The Spurs were 29–4 after 33 games—one of the ten best starts in NBA history–and led the league at 35–6 halfway through the season. Although Duncan produced career lows in points and rebounds per game, the Spurs ended the regular season as the first seed in the West for the 2011 NBA playoffs, and were second in the league (to Chicago). Despite finishing with a 61–21 record, however, the Spurs could not avoid being upset in the first round, 4–2, by the eighth-seeded Memphis Grizzlies.

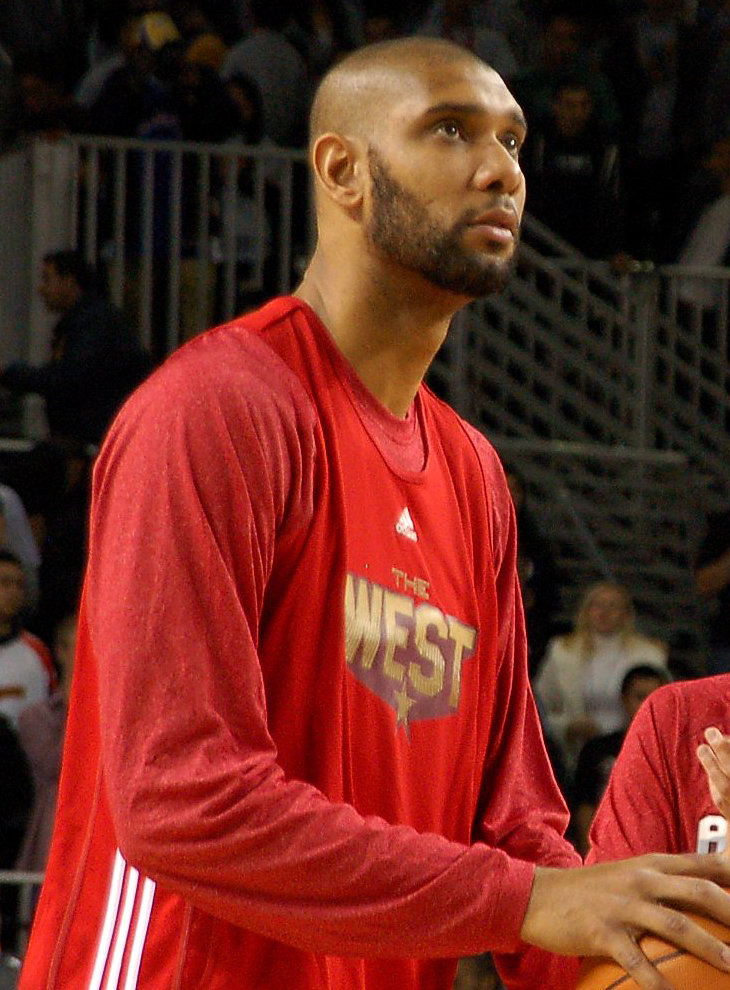
Duncan as an All-Star for the West in 2011

The Spurs again finished the 2011–12 season as the number one seed in the West—it was a lockout-shortened 66-game season—tying with the Chicago Bulls for a league-best 50–16 record. Prior to a game against the Philadelphia 76ers on March 24, 2012, head coach Gregg Popovich decided to give Duncan a night off by listing him on the official scorecard as "DNP-OLD", poking fun at his 36-year-old body. Overall, Duncan's numbers remained at par with the previous season. The triumvirate of Duncan-Parker-Ginóbili entered the 2012 NBA playoffs well-rested and healthy, and the Spurs swept the Utah Jazz and the Los Angeles Clippers 4–0 in the first two rounds. On May 31, 2012, in the third game of the Western Conference Finals against the Oklahoma City Thunder, Duncan set the record for most career blocks in playoffs history, surpassing Kareem Abdul-Jabbar. The Spurs' playoff run came to an end when the Thunder defeated them 4–2.

On July 11, 2012, Duncan agreed to re-sign with the Spurs. Helped by a supporting cast comprising Danny Green, Tiago Splitter, Gary Neal and Kawhi Leonard that had been maturing steadily over the last two seasons, Duncan and the Spurs would again make the playoffs with a 58–24 regular season record. Duncan also returned to the All-Star line-up and was named to the All-NBA First Team. He finished the regular season with 23,785 career points, which broke George Gervin's record for most points in a Spurs uniform (23,602). In the playoffs, the Spurs swept the Los Angeles Lakers, beat Golden State in six games and defeated the Memphis Grizzlies in the Western Conference Finals in a 4–0 sweep to reach the NBA Finals. In Game 2 of the Western Conference Finals, Duncan recorded his 500th playoff block, becoming the first player in NBA history to reach that milestone, although the NBA did not track blocks prior to the 1973–74 season. The Spurs met defending NBA champions Miami Heat in the NBA Finals in a tightly contested series. Miami had home court advantage, but San Antonio took the first game and headed into game 6 with a 3–2 lead. In that game, Duncan scored 25 points in the first half, his biggest haul in a half of an NBA Finals game. However, the Spurs lost the game in overtime, and then lost the deciding seventh game.

==== Fifth championship (2013–2014) ====
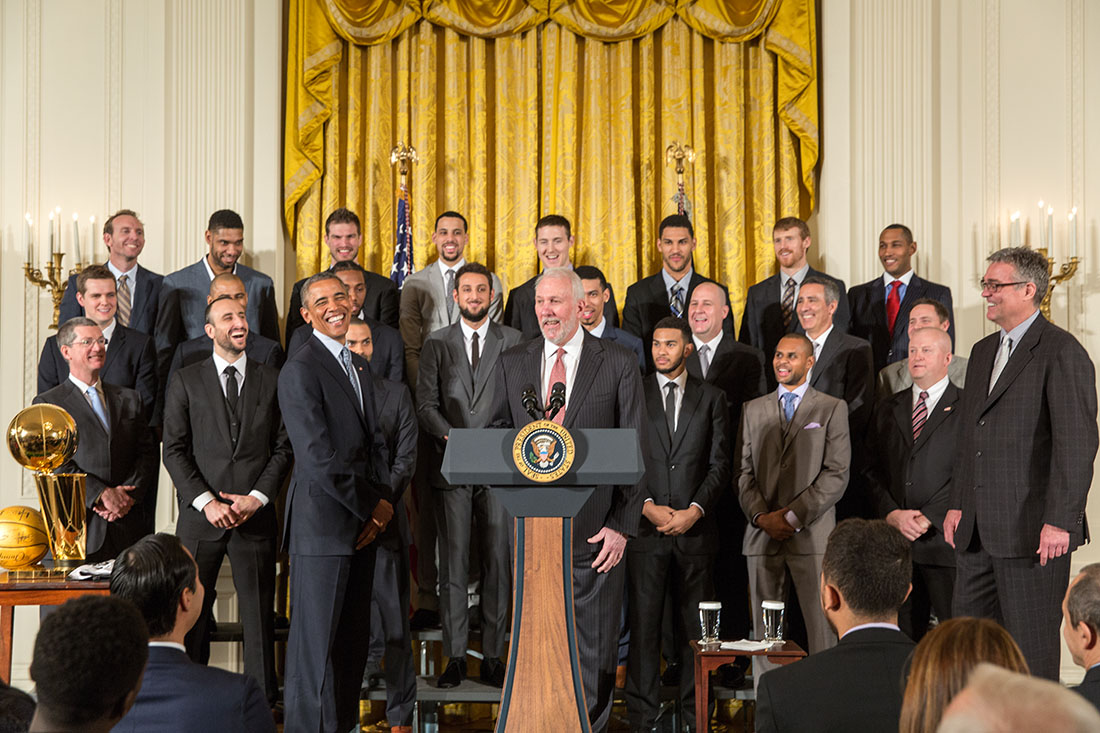
Duncan (back row, second to the left) and the Spurs at the White House after winning the 2014 NBA Finals

On December 2, 2013, Duncan became the oldest player to record a 20–20 game in NBA history, finishing with 23 points, 21 rebounds, and the game-winning jump shot against the Atlanta Hawks. The Spurs went on to conclude the 2013–14 regular season with a league-best 62 wins. The Spurs defeated Dallas in seven games in the first round of the playoffs, Portland in five games in the conference semifinals, and Oklahoma City in six games, where game 6 went into overtime, as the Spurs won, 112–107. They set up a Finals rematch against the Miami Heat, which they won, 4–1, setting a record margin for a win in the NBA Finals, for games 3 and 4. Along the way, the Duncan-Ginóbili-Parker trio broke the record for most wins in NBA playoffs history. After winning the Finals in five games, Duncan joined John Salley as the only players to win a championship in three different decades.

==== Late career (2014–2016) ====
On June 23, 2014, Duncan exercised his $10.3 million player option for the 2014–15 season. On November 14, 2014, Duncan scored his 25,000th point in the first half of the Spurs' 93–80 win over the Los Angeles Lakers, becoming the 19th player in NBA history to reach the milestone. On February 19, 2015, he passed Alex English to move into 16th place on the NBA's all-time scoring list with 30 points against the Los Angeles Clippers. On March 4, he recorded six rebounds against the Sacramento Kings, breaking his tie with Nate Thurmond for ninth in career rebounding. Two days later, he recorded three blocks against the Denver Nuggets to surpass Patrick Ewing for sixth overall in career blocks. On April 12, he played his 1,330th career game against the Phoenix Suns, which passed Moses Malone for 11th all-time. He also scored 22 points and passed Kevin Garnett to move into 14th place on the NBA's all-time scoring list. The Spurs finished sixth in the Western Conference after 82 games and faced the Los Angeles Clippers in the first round of the playoffs. Their quest for back-to-back championships was ended May 2 as they lost to the Clippers in seven games. Duncan was later named to the All-Defensive second team on May 20 for the seventh time in his career.

On July 9, 2015, Duncan re-signed with the Spurs to a two-year deal. On November 2, 2015, in a win over the New York Knicks, Duncan recorded 16 points, 10 rebounds and six assists in his NBA-record 954th victory with one team, surpassing John Stockton's 953 wins with the Utah Jazz. On November 11, he pulled down the 14,716th rebound of his career against the Portland Trail Blazers to pass Robert Parish for seventh place on the NBA's all-time rebounding list. On November 14, in a win over the Philadelphia 76ers, Duncan had five blocked shots to become the Spurs' franchise leader with 2,955 blocks, surpassing former teammate David Robinson's career total of 2,954. Duncan also moved into fifth all-time on the NBA's blocks list. After missing the Spurs' last three games of December due to rest and right knee soreness, Duncan returned to action on January 2, 2016, against the Houston Rockets. In his return game, Duncan was held scoreless for the first time in his 19-year career; giving him the most consecutive games with at least one point, at 1,359. Four days later, Duncan scored a then-season high 18 points in a 123–98 win over the Utah Jazz, helping the Spurs extend their franchise-record home winning streak to 30 straight regular season games dating to 2014–15. On February 10, he returned to the starting lineup after missing eight games with a sore knee. On February 27, in a win over the Houston Rockets, he became the fifth player in NBA history to reach 3,000 blocks. In addition, with six rebounds in the game, Duncan reached 14,971 for his career, surpassing Karl Malone (14,968) for sixth place in league history. On March 10, Duncan became the sixth player in league history with 15,000 rebounds, completing the feat midway through the first quarter of the Spurs' 109–101 win over the Chicago Bulls. On March 19, he came off the bench for only the third time in his career to counter the smaller lineup of the Golden State Warriors. With a win over the Warriors, the Spurs recorded their 35th straight home win of the season and their 44th straight at home dating to 2014–15, tied for the second-longest streak in NBA history with the 1995–96 Chicago Bulls. On April 5, in a win over the Utah Jazz, he became the third player with 1,000 victories in the regular season, following Kareem Abdul-Jabbar and Robert Parish. Duncan extended his mark as the NBA's career leader in victories with one team. On April 8, he scored a season-high 21 points in a losing effort to the Denver Nuggets. Having already locked up second seed in the West with a franchise-best record (65–13 prior to Nuggets game), all four of Duncan's starting teammates were rested. The Spurs went on to lose to the Oklahoma City Thunder in the second round of the playoffs.

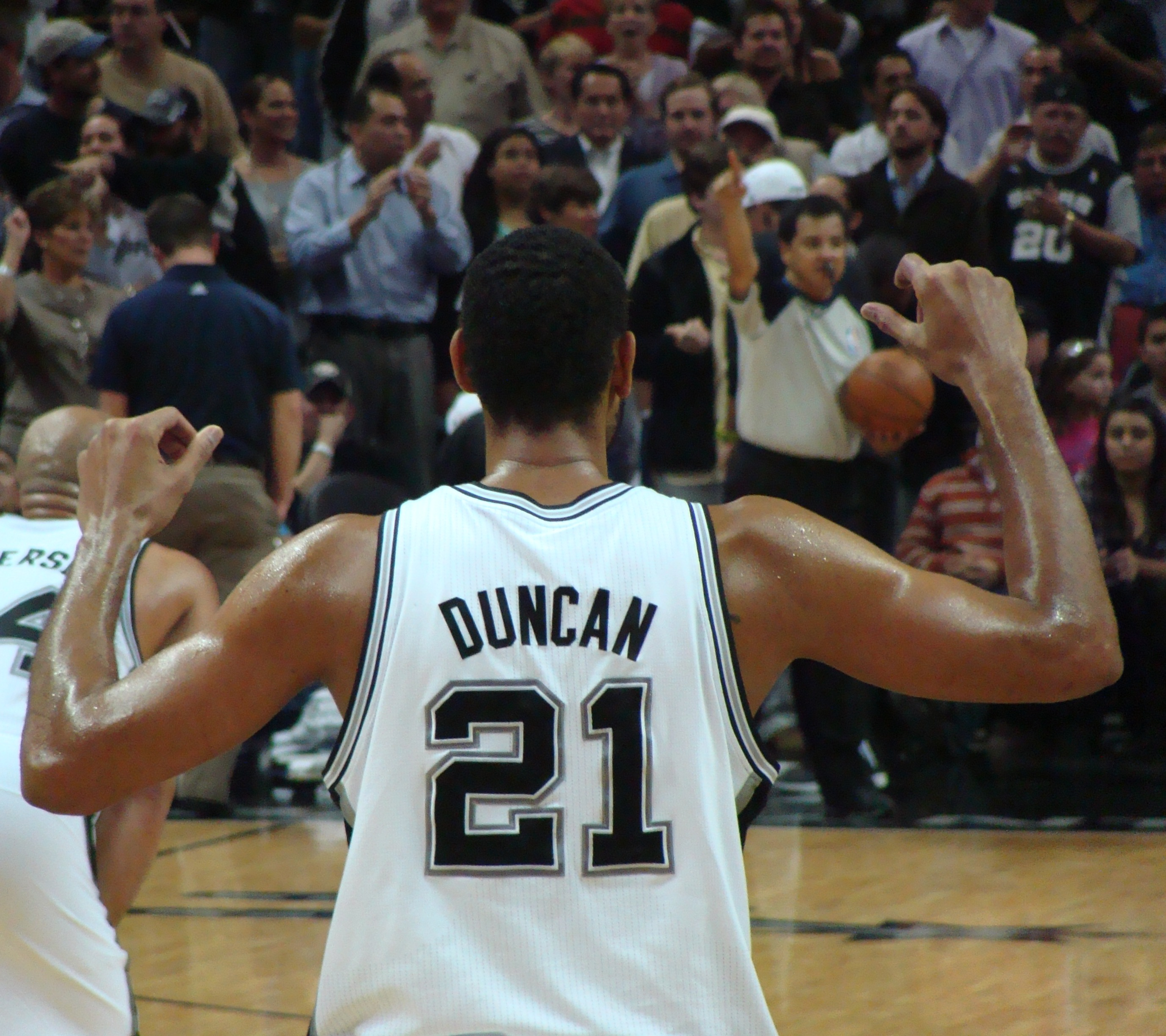
Duncan's 21 jersey was retired months after he stopped playing.

On June 28, 2016, Duncan opted into his $5.6 million contract for the 2016–17 season. However, on July 11, 2016, he announced his retirement from the NBA after 19 seasons with San Antonio. In September 2016, coach Gregg Popovich indicated that Duncan would have a coaching role with the team in the 2016–17 season.

On December 18, 2016, the Spurs retired Duncan's No. 21 jersey in a postgame ceremony, making him the eighth Spur in franchise history to have his jersey retired.

== National team career ==
In 1998, Duncan was selected as one of the last two players for the United States national team for the World Basketball Championship. However, this team was later replaced with CBA and college players because of the NBA lockout. Duncan's first chance at playing for the national team came in 1999 when he was called up to the Olympic Qualifying Team. He averaged 12.7 ppg, 9.1 rpg and 2.4 bpg and led the team to a 10–0 finish en route to a qualifying berth for the 2000 Sydney Olympics, but a knee injury forced him to stay out of the Olympic Games themselves.

In 2003, Duncan was also a member of the USA team that recorded ten wins and qualified for the 2004 Summer Olympics. He started all the games he played in and averaged team bests of 15.6 ppg, 8.0 rpg, 1.56 bpg, while shooting 60.7 percent from the field. At the Olympics itself, the team lost three games on its way to a bronze medal. The record represented more losses in a single year than in the 68 previous years combined. It was also the first time since NBA players became eligible that the U.S. men's basketball team lost a game in international competition and returned home without gold medals. After the tournament, Duncan was disappointed with the team's unpreparedness for the tournament and commented, "I am about 95 percent sure my FIBA career is over. I'll try not to share my experiences with anyone." In total, Duncan was a member of five USA Basketball teams and played in 40 games.

== Player profile ==
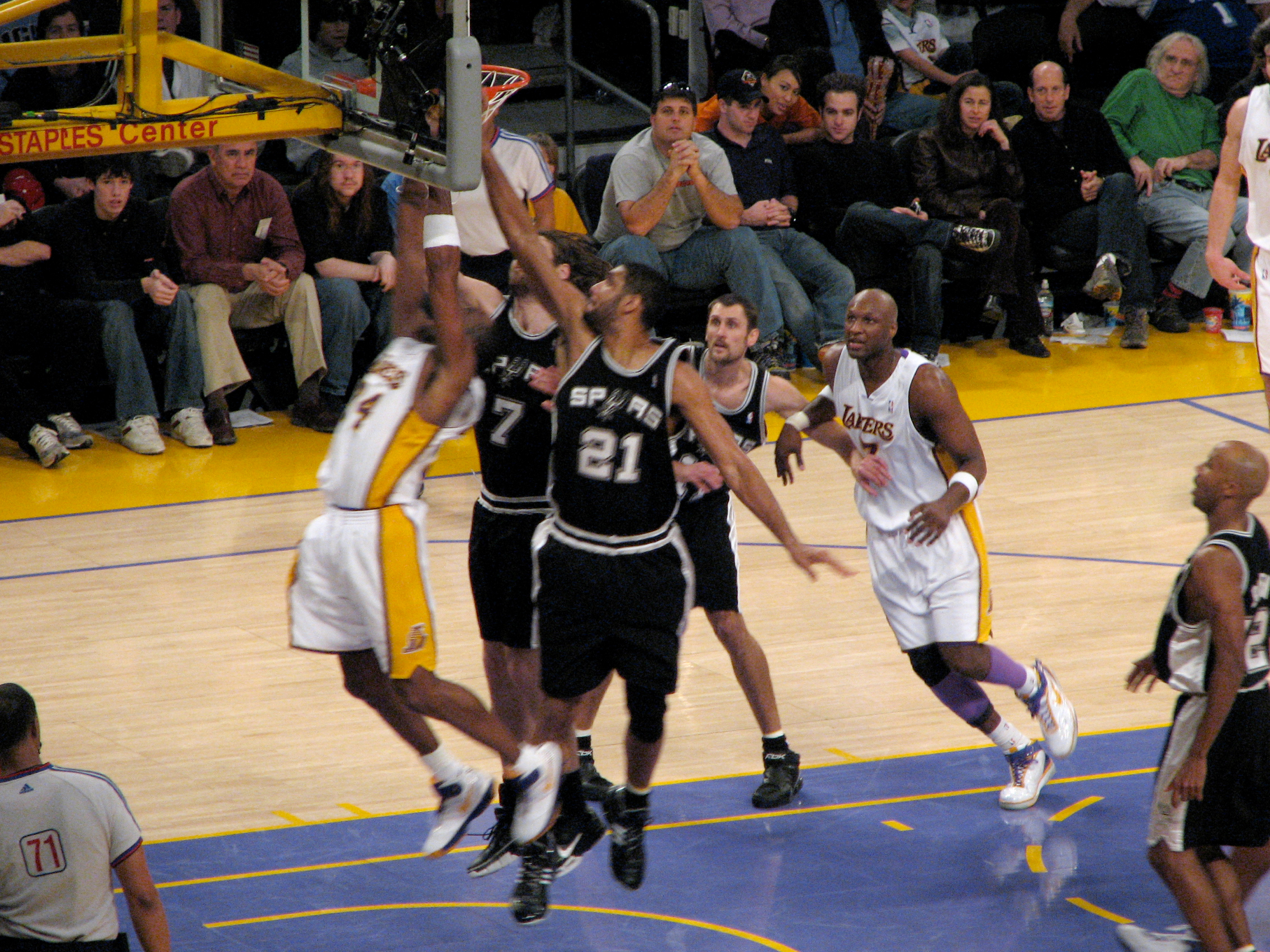
Duncan (No. 21) attempting to block Kobe Bryant's shot in a game against the Los Angeles Lakers at the Staples Center

Standing at 6 feet 11 inches (2.11 m) and weighing 250 pounds (113 kg), Duncan was a power forward who could also play center. With a double-double career average in points and rebounds, he was considered one of the most consistent players in the NBA throughout his career. Regarded as one of the league's best interior defenders, Duncan also ranked consistently as one of the top scorers, rebounders and shot-blockers in the league. At the end of his final season in 2015–16, he was ranked first in regular season point-rebound double-doubles among active players, while he led the charts in postseason point-rebound double-doubles (158 as of 2013–14). His main weakness for much of his career was his free throw shooting, with a career average of less than 70%.

Duncan gained a reputation as a clutch player with three NBA Finals MVP awards and playoff career averages that were higher than his regular-season statistics. Eleven-time NBA champion Bill Russell complimented Duncan on his passing, and rated him as one of the most efficient players of his generation, a view shared by 19-time NBA All-Star Kareem Abdul-Jabbar. Because of his versatility and success, basketball experts widely consider Duncan to be the greatest power forward in NBA history, while coach Popovich and teammates Parker and Ginóbili have also credited much of San Antonio's success to him. Duncan's detractors label him "boring" because of the simple but effective style of play that earned him the nickname "The Big Fundamental". After his first championship ring in 1999, Sports Illustrated described him as a "quiet, boring MVP".

Duncan said, "If you show excitement, then you also may show disappointment or frustration. If your opponent picks up on this frustration, you are at a disadvantage." Sports journalist Kevin Kernan commented on his ability to relax and stay focused, stating that having a degree in psychology, Duncan often not only outplays, but out-psychs his opponents. Shaquille O'Neal had high praise for Duncan's on-court demeanor. "The Spurs won because of Tim Duncan, a guy I could never break," O'Neal wrote in his autobiography. "I could talk trash to Patrick Ewing, get in David Robinson's face, get a rise out of Alonzo Mourning, but when I went at Tim he'd look at me like he was bored."

Duncan has said that he especially likes his bank shot: "It is just easy for me. It just feels good." Duncan's close and longstanding relationship with Spurs coach Gregg Popovich has been described as "the greatest love story in sports".

=== Honors ===
Duncan received a number of individual and team honors, including two-time MVP (2002, 2003), five-time NBA champion (1999, 2003, 2005, 2007, 2014), and three-time NBA Finals MVP (1999, 2003, 2005). As a college player, he was honored by the House of Representatives, named the ACC Male Athlete of the Year, won the John R. Wooden Award and Adolph Rupp Trophy, was selected as the Naismith College Player of the Year, and received 1997 player of the year honors from the United States Basketball Writers Association (USBWA), National Association of Basketball Coaches (NABC) and Sporting News. In 2002, Duncan was named to the ACC 50th Anniversary men's basketball team honoring the 50 greatest players in ACC history. In his debut year in the NBA (1998), he was voted Rookie of the Year and elected into the All-Rookie Team. He has been named to 15 NBA All-Star teams (1997–98; 1999–2000 to 2010–11; 2012–13 and 2014–15), 15 All-NBA Teams (1997–98 to 2009–10, 2012–13, 2014–15; ten First Team nominations), and 15 All-Defensive Teams (1997–98 to 2009–10; 2012–13, 2014–15; eight First Team nominations). Duncan is one of only four players to receive All-NBA First Team honors in each of his first eight seasons (1998–2005), along with Hall-of-Famers Bob Pettit (ten seasons), Larry Bird (nine seasons), and Oscar Robertson (nine seasons), and is the only player in NBA history to receive All-NBA and All-Defensive honors in his first 13 seasons (1997–98 to 2009–10).

The Association for Professional Basketball Research named Duncan one of the "100 Greatest Professional Basketball Players of the 20th Century"; he is the youngest player on that list. In the 2001–02 season, he won the IBM Player Award and the Sporting News (TSN) MVP Award, becoming the third player to win those awards and NBA MVP in the same season. On February 18, 2006, he was named one of the Next 10 Greatest Players on the tenth anniversary of the release of the NBA's 50th Anniversary All-Time Team by the TNT broadcasting crew. In 2009, Duncan was ranked 8th by Slam magazine among the top 50 NBA players of all time. Sports Illustrated named him its NBA Player of the Decade. In 2022, to commemorate the NBA's 75th Anniversary, The Athletic named Duncan as the ninth greatest player in NBA history, the highest-ranked power forward on their list.

On April 4, 2020, it was announced that Duncan would be inducted into the Naismith Memorial Basketball Hall of Fame on August 29. He was named to the NBA 75th Anniversary Team in 2021.

== Coaching career ==
On July 22, 2019, the San Antonio Spurs named Duncan an assistant coach. He debuted as acting head coach on March 3, 2020, leading the Spurs to a 104–103 comeback win over the Charlotte Hornets, which Popovich missed for personal reasons.

On November 12, 2020, Duncan stepped down as assistant coach.

== Career statistics ==
Legend
GP	Games played	GS	Games started	MPG	Minutes per game
FG%	Field goal percentage	3P%	3-point field goal percentage	FT%	Free throw percentage
RPG	Rebounds per game	APG	Assists per game	SPG	Steals per game
BPG	Blocks per game	PPG	Points per game	**Bold**	Career high
†	Won an NBA championship	*	Led the league

=== NBA ===
==== Regular season ====
Year	Team	GP	GS	MPG	FG%	3P%	FT%	RPG	APG	SPG	BPG	PPG
1997–98	San Antonio	**82***	**82***	39.1	**.549**	.000	.662	11.9	2.7	.7	2.5	21.1
1998–99†	San Antonio	50*	50*	39.3	.495	.143	.690	11.4	2.4	**.9**	2.5	21.7
1999–00	San Antonio	74	74	38.9	.490	.091	.761	12.4	3.2	**.9**	2.2	23.2
2000–01	San Antonio	**82**	**82***	38.7	.499	.259	.618	12.2	3.0	**.9**	2.3	22.2
2001–02	San Antonio	**82**	**82**	**40.6**	.508	.100	.799	12.7	3.7	.7	2.5	**25.5**
2002–03†	San Antonio	81	81	39.3	.513	.273	.710	**12.9**	**3.9**	.7	**2.9**	23.3
2003–04	San Antonio	69	68	36.6	.501	.167	.599	12.4	3.1	**.9**	2.7	22.3
2004–05†	San Antonio	66	66	33.4	.496	.333	.670	11.1	2.7	.7	2.6	20.3
2005–06	San Antonio	80	80	34.8	.484	**.400**	.629	11.0	3.2	**.9**	2.0	18.6
2006–07†	San Antonio	80	80	34.1	.546	.111	.637	10.6	3.4	.8	2.4	20.0
2007–08	San Antonio	78	78	34.0	.497	.000	.730	11.3	2.8	.7	1.9	19.3
2008–09	San Antonio	75	75	33.6	.504	.000	.692	10.7	3.5	.5	1.7	19.3
2009–10	San Antonio	78	77	31.3	.519	.182	.725	10.1	3.2	.6	1.5	17.9
2010–11	San Antonio	76	76	28.3	.500	.000	.716	8.9	2.7	.7	1.9	13.4
2011–12	San Antonio	58	58	28.2	.492	.000	.695	9.0	2.3	.7	1.5	15.4
2012–13	San Antonio	69	69	30.1	.502	.286	**.817**	9.9	2.7	.7	2.7	17.8
2013–14†	San Antonio	74	74	29.2	.490	.000	.731	9.7	3.0	.6	1.9	15.1
2014–15	San Antonio	77	77	28.9	.512	.286	.740	9.1	3.0	.8	2.0	13.9
2015–16	San Antonio	61	60	25.2	.488	.000	.702	7.3	2.7	.8	1.3	8.6
Career		1,392	1,389	34.0	.506	.179	.696	10.8	3.0	.7	2.2	19.0
All-Star		15	12	20.7	.548	.250	.765	9.1	2.1	.9	.5	9.3

==== Playoffs ====
Year	Team	GP	GS	MPG	FG%	3P%	FT%	RPG	APG	SPG	BPG	PPG
1998	San Antonio	9	9	41.6	.521	.000	.667	9.0	1.9	.6	2.6	20.7
1999†	San Antonio	17	17	**43.1**	.511	.000	.748	11.5	2.8	.8	2.6	23.2
2001	San Antonio	13	13	40.5	.488	**1.000**	.639	14.5	3.8	1.1	2.7	24.4
2002	San Antonio	9	9	42.2	.453	.333	**.822**	14.4	5.0	.7	**4.3**	**27.6**
2003†	San Antonio	**24**	**24**	42.5	.529	.000	.677	**15.4**	**5.3**	.6	3.3	24.7
2004	San Antonio	10	10	40.5	.522	.000	.632	11.3	3.2	.8	2.0	22.1
2005†	San Antonio	23	23	37.8	.464	.200	.717	12.4	2.7	.3	2.3	23.6
2006	San Antonio	13	13	37.9	.573	.000	.718	10.5	3.3	.8	1.9	25.8
2007†	San Antonio	20	20	36.8	.521	—	.644	11.5	3.3	.7	3.1	22.2
2008	San Antonio	17	17	39.2	.449	.200	.626	14.5	3.3	.9	2.1	20.2
2009	San Antonio	5	5	32.8	.532	—	.607	8.0	3.2	.6	1.2	19.8
2010	San Antonio	10	10	37.3	.520	.500	.478	9.9	2.6	.8	1.7	19.0
2011	San Antonio	6	6	35.3	.478	—	.625	10.5	2.7	.5	2.5	12.7
2012	San Antonio	14	14	33.1	.495	.000	.707	9.4	2.8	.7	2.1	17.4
2013	San Antonio	21	21	35.0	.470	.000	.806	10.2	1.9	.9	1.6	18.1
2014†	San Antonio	23	23	32.7	.523	.000	.760	9.1	1.9	.3	1.3	16.3
2015	San Antonio	7	7	35.7	**.589**	.000	.559	11.1	3.3	**1.3**	1.4	17.9
2016	San Antonio	10	10	21.8	.423	—	.714	4.8	1.4	.2	1.3	5.9
Career		251	251	37.3	.501	.143	.689	11.4	3.0	.7	2.3	20.6

=== College ===
*	Led NCAA Division I
*	Led Atlantic Coast Conference

Year	Team	GP	GS	MPG	FG%	3P%	FT%	RPG	APG	SPG	BPG	PPG
1993–94	Wake Forest	**33**	**32**	30.2	.545	**1.000**	**.745**	9.6	.9	.4	3.8*	9.8
1994–95	Wake Forest	32	**32**	36.5	.591	.429	.742	12.5*	2.1	.4	**4.2***	16.8
1995–96	Wake Forest	32	**32**	**37.2**	.555	.304	.687	12.3*	2.9	**.7**	3.8*	19.1
1996–97	Wake Forest	31	31	36.7	**.608***	.273	.636	**14.7***	**3.2**	**.7**	3.3*	**20.8***
Career		128	127	35.1	.577	.321	.689	12.3	2.3	.5	3.8	16.5

== Awards and honors ==
NBA

- 5× NBA champion: 1999, 2003, 2005, 2007, 2014
- 3× NBA Finals MVP: 1999, 2003, 2005
- 2× NBA Most Valuable Player: 2002, 2003
- 15× NBA All-Star: 1998, 2000–2011, 2013, 2015
- NBA All-Star Game co-MVP (2000)
- 15x All-NBA Team selections:
  - 10× All-NBA First Team: 1998–2005, 2007, 2013
  - 3× All-NBA Second Team: 2006, 2008, 2009
  - 2× All-NBA Third Team: 2010, 2015
- 15x NBA All-Defensive Team selections:
  - 8× NBA All-Defensive First Team: 1999–2003, 2005, 2007, 2008
  - 7× NBA All-Defensive Second Team: 1998, 2004, 2006, 2009, 2010, 2013, 2015
- NBA Rookie of the Year (1998)
- NBA All-Rookie First Team (1998)
- Twyman–Stokes Teammate of the Year (2015)
- IBM Award (2001–02)
- NBA All-Star Weekend Shooting Stars Competition winner (2008)
- NBA 75th Anniversary Team
- No. 21 Retired by San Antonio Spurs

U.S. National Team

- 2003 USA Basketball Male Athlete of the Year
- 1994 Goodwill Games Bronze Medal
- 1995 Summer Universiade Gold Medal
- 1999 FIBA Americas Championship Gold Medal
- 2003 FIBA Americas Championship Gold Medal
- 2004 Summer Olympics Bronze Medal

NCAA

- 1995 ACC Regular Season Champions
- 2× ACC Tournament Champions: 1995, 1996
- 1997 Consensus National College Player of the Year
  - 1997 The Sporting News Men's College Basketball Player of the Year
  - 1997 USBWA College Player of the Year
  - 1997 Associated Press College Basketball Player of the Year
  - 1997 Naismith College Player of the Year
  - 1997 NABC Player of the Year
  - 1997 John R. Wooden Award
  - 1997 Adolph F. Rupp Trophy
- 2× Consensus First-Team All-American: 1996, 1997
  - 2× Associated Press First-Team All-American: 1996, 1997
  - 2× USBWA First-Team All-American: 1996, 1997
  - 2× NABC First-Team All-American: 1996, 1997
  - 1996 UPI First-Team All-American
- 1997 Chip Hilton Player of the Year
- 3× NABC Defensive Player of the Year: 1995–1997
- 1997 NCAA Rebounding leader
- 1997 ACC Athlete of the Year
- 2× ACC Player of the Year: 1996, 1997
- 3× First-Team All-ACC: 1995–1997
- ACC 50th Anniversary Team
- No. 21 Retired by Wake Forest Demon Deacons
- Wake Forest Sports Hall of Fame – Class of 2009

Halls of Fame

- Naismith Memorial Basketball Hall of Fame – Class of 2020
- National Collegiate Basketball Hall of Fame – Class of 2017
- Wake Forest Sports Hall of Fame – Class of 2009
- San Antonio Sports Hall of Fame – Class of 2025 (as a member of the 1999 San Antonio Spurs Championship Team)

Media

- 2003 ESPN American Athlete of the Year
- ESPY Awards
  - 1997 Best Male College Basketball Player
  - 2× Best NBA Player: 2000, 2003
- 2× The Sporting News NBA MVP: 2002, 2003
- 2003 Sports Illustrated Sportsman of the Year
- 2× Sports Illustrated Best NBA Player: 2002, 2003
- 1998 Sporting News Rookie of the Year
- Sports Illustrated 2000s NBA Player of the Decade
- Sports Illustrated 2000s NBA All-Decade First Team
- Associated Press 2000s NBA All-Decade First Team
- The Sporting News 2000s NBA All-Decade First Team

== Personal life ==
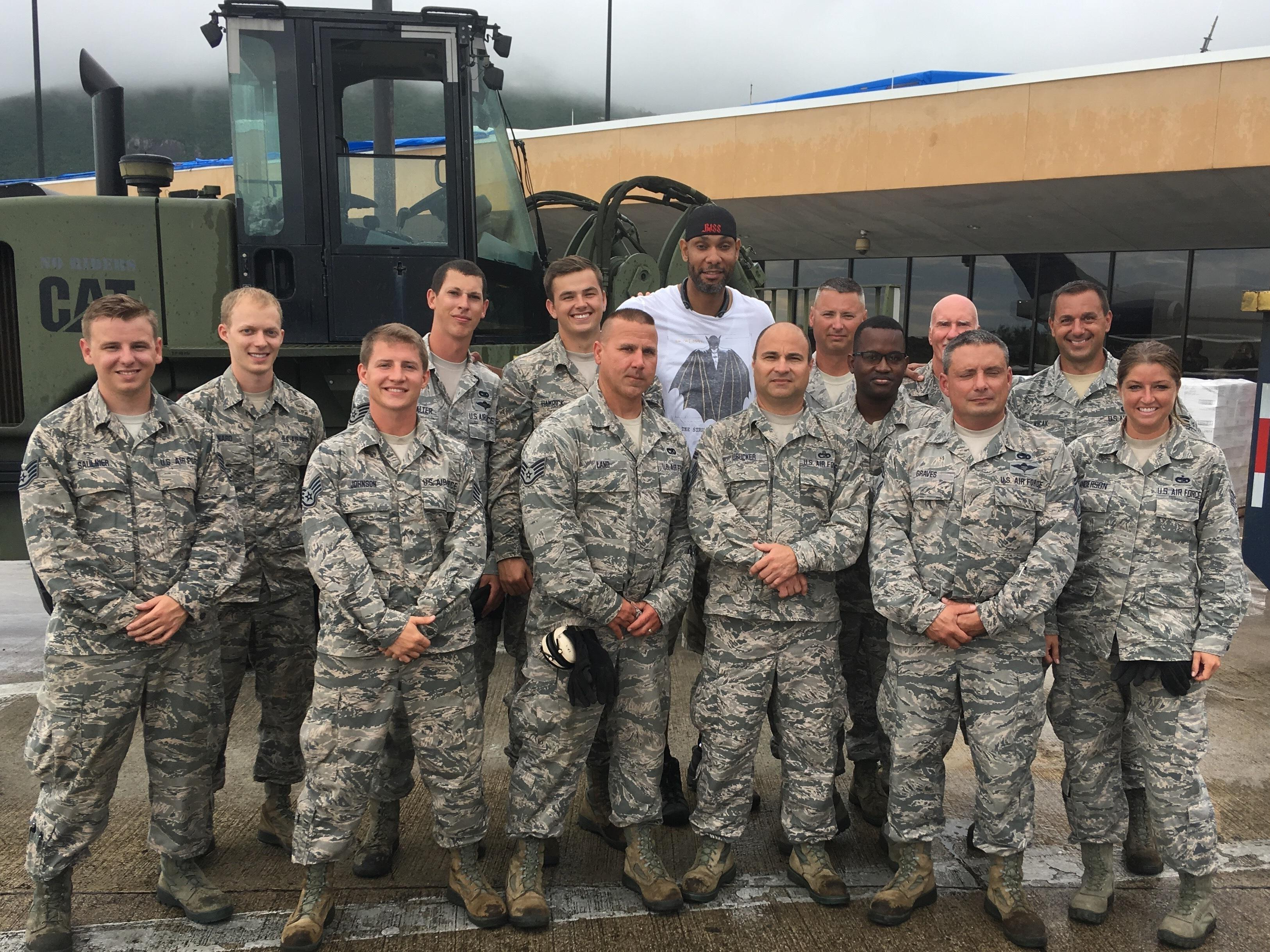
Duncan with members of the North Carolina Air National Guard at Cyril E. King Airport in 2017 after unloading 77,000 pounds of food donated by Duncan following Hurricane Irma and Hurricane Maria

Duncan married Amy Sherrill in July 2001, and had two children before their divorce in August 2013. In 2017, Duncan and his girlfriend welcomed their first child.

In 2001, Duncan established the Tim Duncan Foundation to fund programs involving health awareness and research, education, and youth sports and recreation in San Antonio, Winston-Salem, and the United States Virgin Islands. The foundation's major events have included the Tim Duncan Bowling for Dollar$ Charity Bowl-A-Thon and the Slam Duncan Charity Golf Classic. Between 2001 and 2002, the foundation raised more than $350,000 for breast and prostate cancer research. In those two years, Duncan was named by Sporting News as one of the "Good Guys" in sports. Duncan has also supported the Children's Bereavement Center, the Children's Center of San Antonio and the Cancer Therapy and Research Center. In August 2017, BlackJack Speed Shop, in partnership with The Tim Duncan Foundation, organized urgently needed supplies for victims of Hurricane Harvey.

Duncan cites his late mother as his main inspiration. Among other things, she taught him and his sisters the nursery rhyme "Good, Better, Best. Never let it rest/Until your Good is Better, and your Better is your Best", which he adopted as his personal motto. On and off the court, he believes that the three most important values are dedication, teamwork and camaraderie. He chose No. 21 for his jersey because that was his brother-in-law's college number, since he was Duncan's main basketball inspiration. Duncan also cites Hall-of-Fame Los Angeles Lakers point guard Magic Johnson as his childhood idol.

Duncan was honored with the Virgin Islands Medal of Honor, the highest award bestowed by the Virgin Islands territorial government, and has been celebrated in several "Tim Duncan Day" ceremonies. In 2000, Legislature of the Virgin Islands President Vargrave Richards said, "He is a quiet giant. His laid-back attitude is the embodiment of the people of St. Croix, doing things without fanfare and hoopla."

Duncan enjoys Renaissance fairs and the fantasy role-playing game Dungeons & Dragons.

In 2015, Duncan sued his former investment adviser Charles Banks, claiming over $20 million in losses. In September 2016, a federal grand jury indicted Banks on two counts of wire fraud related to the case. In April 2017, Banks pled guilty to wire fraud in the case; In June 2018, Duncan reached a settlement with Banks and received $7.5 million.

In March 2020, Duncan offered to pay for airline tickets for college students in the U.S. Virgin Islands to travel home during the COVID-19 pandemic.

== See also ==
- List of NBA career scoring leaders
- List of NBA franchise career scoring leaders
- List of NBA career rebounding leaders
- List of NBA career blocks leaders
- List of NBA career turnovers leaders
- List of NBA career personal fouls leaders
- List of NBA career free throw scoring leaders
- List of NBA seasons played leaders
- List of NBA career minutes played leaders
- List of NBA career playoff scoring leaders
- List of NBA career playoff rebounding leaders
- List of NBA career playoff blocks leaders
- List of NBA career playoff turnovers leaders
- List of NBA career playoff free throw scoring leaders
- List of NBA career playoff games played leaders
- List of NBA career playoff triple-double leaders
- List of oldest and youngest NBA players
- List of NBA players who have spent their entire career with one franchise
- List of NCAA Division I men's basketball players with 2,000 points and 1,000 rebounds
- List of NCAA Division I men's basketball season rebounding leaders
- List of NCAA Division I men's basketball career rebounding leaders
- List of NCAA Division I men's basketball career blocks leaders
