= St. Dunstan's Episcopal High School =

High school in the US Virgin Islands, United States

Coordinates: 17°44′35″N 64°43′15″W

Information
- Type: Private
- Religious affiliation: Episcopal Church
- Established: 1959
- Status: Closed
- Grades: K-12
- Gender: Co-educational
- Affiliation: Episcopal Diocese of the Virgin Islands

St. Dunstan's Episcopal High School was a K-12 on St. Croix, United States Virgin Islands.

St. Dunstan's was founded as a K-12 in 1959 by a committee of parishioners from St. John's Episcopal Church, among them a church layreader Dr. Richard Marshall Bond and his wife Edith Gereau Bond. Dr. Bond suggested the name chosen for the school. As a result of the closure of the former Hess Oil Refinery in 2012 and resulting layoffs and departures increasing competition with other private and parochial schools, St. Dunstan's folded about 35 years later.

The Episcopal Diocese of the Virgin Islands continues to own the St. Dunstan's campus. The diocese is open to reopening the school, depending on demand. In the interim, the property has been converted into a hostel, with priority going to victims and relief workers if a disaster occurs. It is available for weekly group rental otherwise.

== Alumni ==
- Tim Duncan, NBA basketball player and Hall of Famer
- Albert Bryan (politician), Governor of the United States Virgin Islands
