= 1996 NCAA Men's Basketball All-Americans =

- Awarded for: 1995–96 NCAA Division I men's basketball season

The Consensus 1996 College Basketball All-American team, as determined by aggregating the results of four major All-American teams. To earn "consensus" status, a player must win honors from a majority of the following teams: the Associated Press, the USBWA, The United Press International and the National Association of Basketball Coaches.

1996 was the last year that the UPI teams were named. After being considered a part of consensus selections since 1949, they would be replaced in 1998 by the Sporting News All-American team.

== 1996 Consensus All-America team ==
Consensus First Team
Player	Position	Class	Team
Ray Allen	G	Junior	Connecticut
Marcus Camby	C	Junior	Massachusetts
Tony Delk	G	Senior	Kentucky
Tim Duncan	C	Junior	Wake Forest
Allen Iverson	G	Sophomore	Georgetown
Kerry Kittles	G	Senior	Villanova

Consensus Second Team
Player	Position	Class	Team
Danny Fortson	F	Sophomore	Cincinnati
Keith Van Horn	F	Junior	Utah
Jacque Vaughn	G	Junior	Kansas
John Wallace	F	Senior	Syracuse
Lorenzen Wright	F/C	Sophomore	Memphis

== Individual All-America teams ==
All-America Team
All-America Team	First team		Second team		Third team	
All-America Team	Player	School	Player	School	Player	School
Associated Press	Ray Allen	Connecticut	Tony Delk	Kentucky	Shareef Abdur-Rahim	California
Associated Press	Marcus Camby	Massachusetts	Danny Fortson	Cincinnati	Brian Evans	Indiana
Associated Press	Tim Duncan	Wake Forest	Keith Van Horn	Utah	Stephon Marbury	Georgia Tech
Associated Press	Allen Iverson	Georgetown	Jacque Vaughn	Kansas	Jason Sasser	Texas Tech
Associated Press	Kerry Kittles	Villanova	John Wallace	Syracuse	Lorenzen Wright	Memphis
USBWA	Ray Allen	Connecticut	Danny Fortson	Cincinnati	No third team	
USBWA	Marcus Camby	Massachusetts	Kerry Kittles	Villanova	No third team	
USBWA	Tony Delk	Kentucky	Keith Van Horn	Utah	No third team	
USBWA	Tim Duncan	Wake Forest	Jacque Vaughn	Kansas	No third team	
USBWA	Allen Iverson	Georgetown	John Wallace	Syracuse	No third team	
NABC	Ray Allen	Connecticut	Tony Delk	Kentucky	Shareef Abdur-Rahim	California
NABC	Marcus Camby	Massachusetts	Danny Fortson	Cincinnati	Brian Evans	Indiana
NABC	Tim Duncan	Wake Forest	Keith Van Horn	Utah	Stephon Marbury	Georgia Tech
NABC	Allen Iverson	Georgetown	Jacque Vaughn	Kansas	Ryan Minor	Oklahoma
NABC	Kerry Kittles	Villanova	John Wallace	Syracuse	Lorenzen Wright	Memphis
UPI	Ray Allen	Connecticut	Danny Fortson	Cincinnati	Brian Evans	Indiana
UPI	Marcus Camby	Massachusetts	Kerry Kittles	Villanova	Malik Rose	Drexel
UPI	Tony Delk	Kentucky	Keith Van Horn	Utah	Jason Sasser	Texas Tech
UPI	Tim Duncan	Wake Forest	Jacque Vaughn	Kansas	Doron Sheffer	Connecticut
UPI	Allen Iverson	Georgetown	Lorenzen Wright	Memphis	John Wallace	Syracuse

AP Honorable Mention

- Drew Barry, Georgia Tech
- Marcus Brown, Murray State
- Ace Custis, Virginia Tech
- Erick Dampier, Mississippi State
- Adonal Foyle, Colgate
- Todd Fuller, NC State
- Matt Harpring, Georgia Tech
- Ronnie Henderson, LSU
- Brevin Knight, Stanford
- Pete Lisicky, Penn State
- Marcus Mann, Mississippi Valley State
- Anquell McCollum, Western Carolina
- Ryan Minor, Oklahoma
- Steve Nash, Santa Clara
- Jeff Nordgaard, Wisconsin–Green Bay
- Charles O'Bannon, UCLA
- Edgar Padilla, Massachusetts
- Malik Rose, Drexel
- Shea Seals, Tulsa
- Jess Settles, Iowa
- Antoine Walker, Kentucky
- Bonzi Wells, Ball State
- Dedric Willoughby, Iowa State
