= Deborah L. Best =

American psychologist

Deborah L. Best is the William L. Poteat Professor of Psychology at Wake Forest University in Winston-Salem, North Carolina.

== Education ==
Best earned a bachelor's degree in psychology and an MA in General Experimental Psychology at Wake Forest University, and a PhD in developmental psychology at the University of North Carolina at Chapel Hill.

== Career ==
Best is a professor of psychology at Wake Forest University and served as the first female Dean of the College at Wake Forest University.

Best is the Editor-in-Chief of The Journal of Cross-Cultural Psychology. Best is also a former president of the International Association for Cross-Cultural Psychology. Best is the recipient of the 2017 American Psychology Association's - Division 52 - Florence L. Denmark and Mary E. Reuder Award.

== Books ==
- Measuring Sex Stereotypes: A Thirty-Nation Study (with John E. Williams) (1982, Sage Publications; ISBN 0803918372).
- Sex and Psyche: Gender and Self Viewed Cross-Culturally (with John E. Williams) (1990, Sage Publications; ISBN 0803937695)
