= Twin Towers (San Antonio Spurs) =

Basketball duo consisting of Tim Duncan and David Robinson

"Twin Towers"

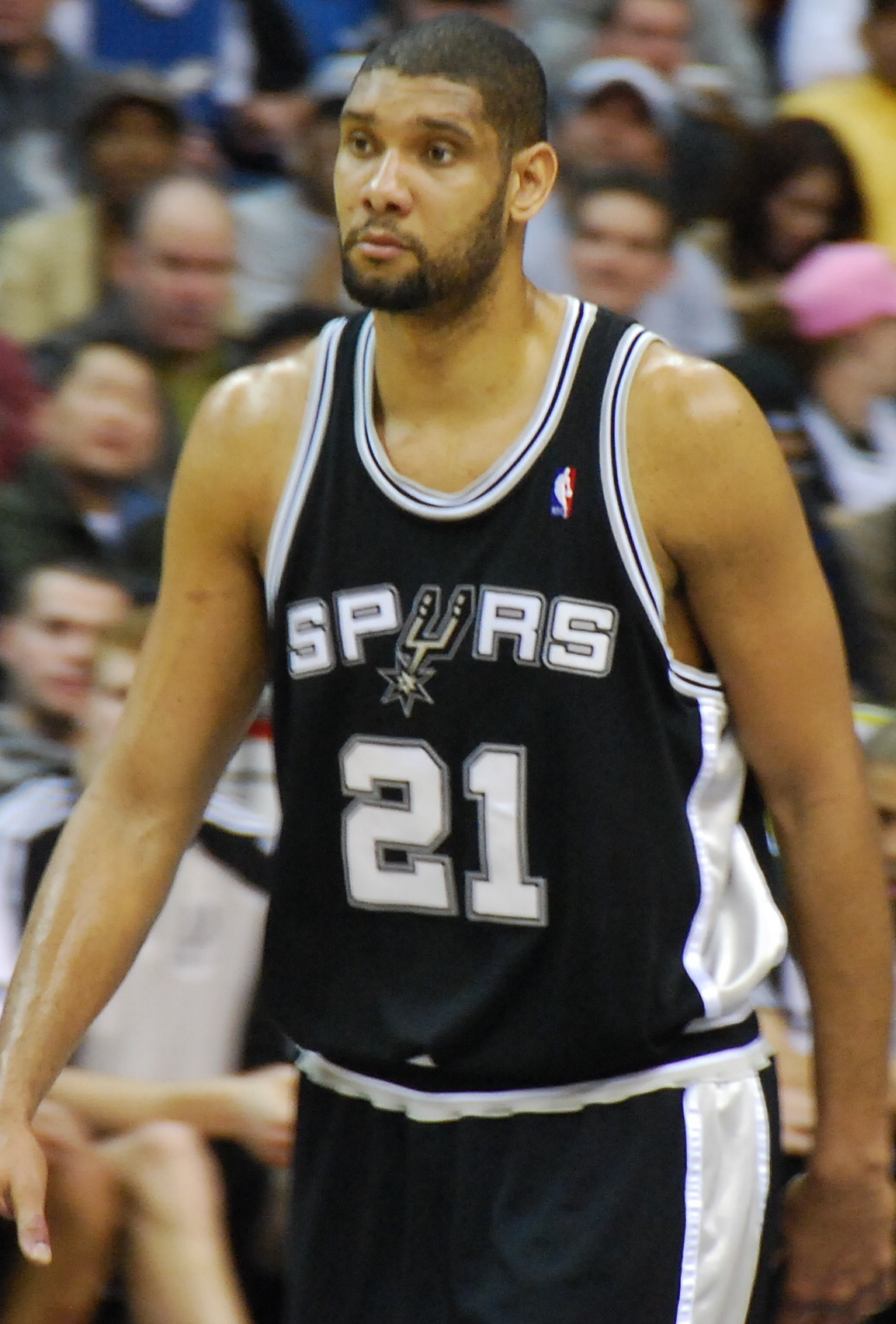
Tim Duncan

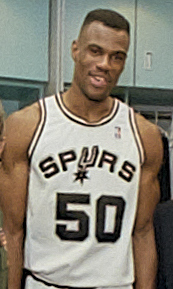
David Robinson

The Twin Towers was the professional basketball duo of Tim Duncan and David Robinson, who played for the San Antonio Spurs of the National Basketball Association (NBA) from 1997 to 2003. Both players were selected first overall by the Spurs in the NBA draft; Robinson was selected in 1987 and Duncan was selected in 1997. Both spent their entire careers as Spurs, and they played together from 1997 to 2003. The Twin Towers were known for their scoring, for their stifling defense, and for helping lead the Spurs to NBA championships in 1999 and 2003.

== Players ==
=== David Robinson ===
David Robinson played four years of college basketball at Navy prior to being selected first overall in 1987 by the Spurs. Robinson began college with no expectations of playing in the NBA, but like Duncan, won numerous national player of the year awards in his senior season. Robinson led Navy to the Elite Eight in the 1986 NCAA tournament as a #7 regional seed. Robinson was selected as the #1 overall pick in the 1987 NBA Draft, but had to wait two years to join the Spurs because of his active-duty obligation with the Navy.

Prior to Robinson's arrival, the Spurs were one of the worst teams in the NBA as they were just coming off of a 21–61 record. Robinson led the Spurs to the greatest single season turnaround in NBA history at the time in his rookie season, as he led the Spurs to a 56–26 record and to the second round of the NBA Playoffs where they would lose to the eventual Western Conference champions Portland Trail Blazers in seven games. Robinson would be unanimously named the NBA rookie of the year that season.

Robinson's success would continue on as he was named NBA MVP in 1995 and one of the 50 greatest players in NBA history, and he would lead the Spurs to the playoffs in each of the next six seasons, but he would only lead the Spurs to the Western Conference finals once in that span, where he would go head-to-head against chief rival Hakeem Olajuwon as the Spurs would fall to the Houston Rockets in six games.

The 1996–97 season was a particularly frustrating season for the Spurs as Robinson would hurt his back in preseason play and would not return until December, and six games after he finally returned, he suffered a season-ending injury as he broke his foot. As a result, the Spurs finished the season with a dismal 20–62 record.

=== Tim Duncan ===
Prior to being selected number one overall by the Spurs in the 1997 NBA Draft, Tim Duncan played at Wake Forest for four years. Despite many speculations that Duncan would go pro early and would be the number one pick if he did so, he would not go pro until he graduated from college and played all four of his years with Wake Forest. Despite never making the Final Four, Duncan's college career at Wake Forest was considered to be a success.

In his sophomore season, Duncan led Wake Forest to a win over a Rasheed Wallace-led North Carolina squad in the ACC Championship Game and would also lead Wake Forest to a #1 seed in the 1995 NCAA tournament and a trip to the Sweet 16, but despite Duncan's 12 points and 22 rebounds in their Sweet 16 game, Wake Forest would lose to Oklahoma State 71–66 in the Sweet 16. Duncan would be named to the All-ACC 1st team that season.

Duncan's leadership at Wake Forest stepped up in his junior year as Wake Forest lost his teammate Randolph Childress to graduation and selection in the 1995 NBA draft. Despite playing on an inexperienced squad, Duncan would lead Wake Forest to a 26–6 record, including a 12–4 record in ACC play, a second consecutive ACC tournament championship, and a trip to the NCAA Elite Eight, where despite 14 points, 16 rebounds, and six assists from Duncan, Wake Forest would fall to eventual national champion Kentucky 83–64. Duncan would be named ACC Defensive Player of the Year and ACC Player of the Year for a remarkable season with Wake Forest.

Despite a disappointing senior season losing in the semifinals of the ACC tournament and getting beat by Stanford in the second round of the NCAA tournament, Duncan had an impressive year that season as he won numerous national player of the year awards, including being a unanimous pick for the Oscar Robertson Trophy and the Naismith Award, and was voted ACC Player of the Year again.

== "Twin Towers" era ==
After having the third-worst record in the 1996–97 season, the San Antonio Spurs won the NBA draft lottery, giving them the #1 pick in the 1997 NBA draft. With that #1 pick, they drafted Tim Duncan. Paired together, the 7'1" Robinson and the 6'11" Duncan became known as the Twin Towers. The Twin Towers played together for the Spurs from 1997 to 2003. Both Robinson and Duncan were skilled offensive players, and the Twin Towers also anchored the Spurs' formidable defense. The duo helped lead the team to NBA championships in 1999 and 2003.

Duncan quickly became a dominant force in the NBA as he was named to the All-NBA First Team in his rookie season as well as being selected to play in the NBA All-Star Game in his rookie season and was named NBA Rookie of the Year for that year. Like Robinson, Duncan led the Spurs to another turnaround as he led the Spurs to a 56–26 record and qualification for the 1998 NBA Playoffs, which is the first of what would become a 21-year playoff streak for the San Antonio Spurs, which would last Tim Duncan's entire career with the Spurs.

In Duncan's playoff debut, he had a bad first half and with the Spurs trailing the Phoenix Suns 50–45 at halftime, Suns coach Danny Ainge decided to put less defensive pressure on Duncan, and as a result, would finish Game 1 with 32 points and 10 rebounds as the Spurs would emerge with a 102–96 victory in Game 1. The Spurs would end up winning the series 3–1, thanks to strong performances by Robinson and Duncan, and would go on to face the Utah Jazz in the second round of the NBA Playoffs where Duncan would go head-to-head against Hall of Fame power forward Karl Malone. Duncan would end up outscoring Malone in the first two games of the series by a margin of 33–25 in Game 1 and by a margin of 26–22 in Game 2 but despite that, the Spurs ended up losing both of the first two games heading back to San Antonio down 0–2. Malone would end up outscoring Duncan in the next three games, doing so by a margin of 18–10 in Game 3 (which the Spurs ended up winning), 34–22 in Game 4, and 24–14 in Game 5 to eliminate the Spurs from the playoffs in five games en route to winning the Western Conference championship.

Before the start of the 1998–99 season, the NBA owners and NBA commissioner David Stern locked out the NBA Players' Association to force negotiations on a new Collective Bargaining Agreement. This lockout lasted for 202 days, well into the regular NBA season, before an agreement was finally reached, resulting in a shortened 50-game season.

The Twin Towers were able to lead the Spurs to an NBA-best 37–13 record in the shortened 50-game season, earning home court advantage throughout the playoffs as a result. The Spurs breezed through the NBA Playoffs as they beat the Minnesota Timberwolves 3–1 in the first round and then swept the Los Angeles Lakers and the Portland Trail Blazers in the conference semifinals and the conference finals, respectively, to reach the NBA Finals for the first time in franchise history. The "Twin Towers" had dominant performances in the first two games of the series as they had 87 points, 51 rebounds, and 14 blocks over the first two games while holding New York Knicks counterparts Chris Dudley and Larry Johnson to 12 points, 13 rebounds, and three blocks over the first two games, en route to cruising to a 2–0 series lead in the NBA Finals. Despite combining for 45 points and 22 rebounds in Game 3, the Spurs still lost the game 89–81 to the Knicks. Duncan and Robinson were dominant once again in Game 4 as they combined for 42 points and 35 rebounds en route to a 96–89 win over the Knicks and a 3–1 series lead. In the final seconds of Game 5, Tim Duncan and David Robinson double teamed Latrell Sprewell on his last-second shot attempt to win Game 5 78-77 off of another dominant performance by the "Twin Towers", who combined for 46 points and 21 rebounds, to win their first ever NBA championship and Duncan would be named NBA Finals MVP.

The success of the "Twin Towers" would continue through the 1999–2000 season as they finished second place in the Midwest Division with a 53–29 record and would earn the #4 seed in the NBA Playoffs. However, Duncan would suffer a season-ending knee injury and as a result, the Spurs lost to the Suns 3–1 in the first round of the playoffs.

The following season, the "Twin Towers" would lead the Spurs to an NBA-best record of 58-24 and would earn home court advantage throughout the 2001 NBA Playoffs. The Spurs cruised to the Western Conference Finals with a 3–1 win over the Timberwolves and a 4–1 win over the Dallas Mavericks in the first round and conference semifinals, respectively, but the Spurs would end up getting swept by the eventual NBA Champion, Los Angeles Lakers, in the Western Conference Finals, who were led by NBA superstar duo Shaquille O'Neal and Kobe Bryant.

The "Twin Towers" would lead the San Antonio Spurs to another Midwest Division title the following season, this time finishing as the #2 seed in the Western Conference. The Spurs would end up beating the Seattle SuperSonics in five games in the first round (note: prior to the 2002–03 NBA season, all first round series were best-of-five series). In the conference semifinals series against the Los Angeles Lakers, the Spurs would take a lead going into the fourth quarter in all five games as Duncan had steady production in this series with a double-double in every game, but the Spurs were unable to hold off Kobe Bryant's fourth quarter heroics and were only able to win one game in that series as a result. After posting 34 points and 25 rebounds in Game 5, Duncan stated his frustration: "I thought we really had a chance at this series. The Lakers proved to be more than we could handle. Again, we had a (heck) of a run at it. We had opportunities to win games and make it a different series, but that's just the way the ball rolls sometimes." Also, Robinson said "Tim [Duncan] was like Superman out there", and conceded that the Lakers were simply better, just like in the last playoffs campaign. Tim Duncan would be named the NBA MVP for the 2001–02 season.

The 2002–03 season would be the last season the "Twin Towers" would be playing together, as David Robinson announced that he was going to retire at the end of the season. In the final season of the "Twin Towers", they, coupled with the newly formed "Big Three" of Duncan, Tony Parker, and Manu Ginóbili would lead the Spurs to an NBA-best record of 60-22 and would earn home court advantage throughout the entire playoffs for the third time in the last five years. The Spurs got past the Suns in a six-game series. In the conference semifinals against the Lakers, Tim Duncan was matched up against eventual teammate Robert Horry, and would dominate him the entire series. In Game 6 of the series, Duncan had 37 points and 16 rebounds to close out the series with a 110–82 victory over the Los Angeles Lakers, avenging their last two playoff losses to the Los Angeles Lakers. After the series, Spurs head coach Greg Popovich stated: "I thought in Game 5 and Game 6, he [Duncan] was astounding in his focus. He pulled everyone along these last two games." The Spurs would get by the Mavericks in a six-game series in the Western Conference Finals to advance to the 2003 NBA Finals. In what would be Robinson's final game of his NBA career, the "Twin Towers" would combine for 34 points and 27 rebounds, as Robinson had 13 points and 17 rebounds, and Duncan had a triple double with 21 points, 10 rebounds, and 10 assists, and was two blocks shy of a quadruple double as the San Antonio Spurs defeated the New Jersey Nets 88–77 to close out the series in Game 6 and win the NBA Championship. Following the NBA Finals victory, Duncan said: "We were all confident that something would happen, that we would turn the game to our favor, and it did", but felt sad that Robinson retired after winning his second championship ring. Tim Duncan would be named NBA MVP for that season, and would also be named NBA Finals MVP for the 2003 NBA Finals, and the "Twin Towers" were named Sports Illustrated's 2003 "Sportsmen of the Year".

== Aftermath ==
On November 10, 2003, the Spurs retired David Robinson's jersey no. 50. He was inducted into the Naismith Memorial Basketball Hall of Fame in 2009, in his first year of eligibility.

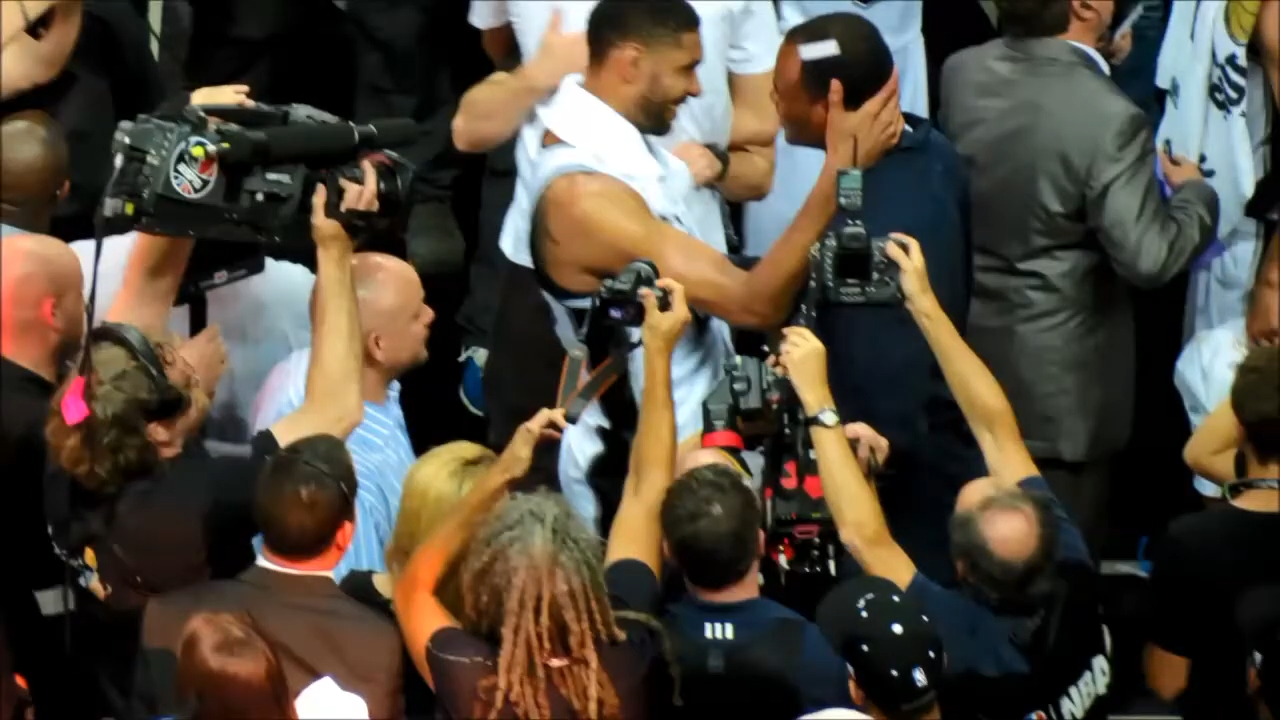
Robinson congratulating Duncan after the Spurs won the 2014 NBA Finals

The next era for Duncan began during Robinson's final season, as the Spurs drafted Tony Parker in the first round of the 2001 NBA draft and Manu Ginóbili joined the Spurs in time for the 2002–03 NBA season after they drafted him in the second round of the 1999 NBA draft. Duncan, Parker, and Ginobili went on to form San Antonio's Big Three. The Big Three played until 2016 and would win NBA titles in 2005, 2007, and 2014 before Duncan's retirement from the NBA on July 11, 2016. Duncan's No. 21 jersey was retired by the Spurs on December 18, 2016. On May 13, 2021, Duncan was inducted into the Naismith Hall of Fame.

== See also ==
- Big Three (San Antonio Spurs)
