= 1995 ACC men's basketball tournament =

- Classification: Division I
- Season: 1994–95
- Teams: 9
- Site: Greensboro, North Carolina; Greensboro Coliseum
- Champions: Wake Forest (3rd title)
- Winning coach: Dave Odom (1st title)
- MVP: Randolph Childress (Wake Forest)
- Top scorer: Randolph Childress (107 points)
- Television: Raycom Sports/Jefferson Pilot Sports

1994–95 ACC men's basketball standings
	Conf.				Overall
Team	W		L	PCT	W		L	PCT
No. 3 Wake Forest †	12	–	4	.750	26	–	6	.813
No. 4 North Carolina	12	–	4	.750	28	–	6	.824
No. 10 Maryland	12	–	4	.750	26	–	8	.765
No. 13 Virginia	12	–	4	.750	25	–	9	.735
Georgia Tech	8	–	8	.500	18	–	12	.600
Florida State	5	–	11	.313	12	–	15	.444
Clemson	5	–	11	.313	15	–	13	.536
NC State	4	–	12	.250	12	–	15	.444
Duke	2	–	14	.125	13	–	18	.419
† 1995 ACC tournament winner Rankings from AP poll

The 1995 Atlantic Coast Conference men's basketball tournament took place in Greensboro, North Carolina, at the Greensboro Coliseum. Wake Forest won the tournament, defeating North Carolina, 82–80, in the championship game. Randolph Childress of Wake Forest was named tournament MVP, scoring 107 points in three games, a tournament record that still stands as of 2020.

== Bracket ==
First round March 9
8	NC State	70
9	Duke	83

Quarterfinals; March 10
1	#7 Wake Forest	87
9	Duke	70
4	#11 Virginia	77
5	Georgia Tech	67
3	#10 Maryland	71
6	Florida State	64
2	#4 North Carolina	78
7	Clemson	62

Semifinals; March 11
1	#7 Wake Forest	77
4	#11 Virginia	68
3	#10 Maryland	92
2	#4 North Carolina	97^{OT}

Championship Game; March 12
1	#7 Wake Forest	82^{OT}
2	#4 North Carolina	80

AP rankings at time of tournament

== Games ==
=== Finals ===
March 12, 1995

Recap

North Carolina Tar Heels 80, Wake Forest Demon Deacons 82 (OT)
Pts: Randolph Childress 37

Greensboro Coliseum, Greensboro, North Carolina

Randolph Childress penetrated from the lane, drove right, and hit a 10-footer with 4.6 seconds left. North Carolina had one more chance as Pearce Landry inbounded to Jerry Stackhouse, who launched a three-pointer that bounced off the rim, and Landry failed to tip in. Childress, who scored a game-high 37 points, broke the ACC Tournament scoring record of Lennie Rosenbluth (1957) and was named Tournament MVP. It was Wake Forest's first conference title since 1962.

== Awards and honors ==
=== Everett Case Award ===
Player	School
Randolph Childress	Wake Forest

=== All Tournament Teams ===
==== First Team ====
Player	School
Randolph Childress	Wake Forest
Tim Duncan	Wake Forest
Jerry Stackhouse	North Carolina
Rasheed Wallace	North Carolina
Junior Burrough	Virginia

==== Second Team ====
Player	School
Joe Smith	Maryland
Donald Williams	North Carolina
Exree Hipp	Maryland
Dante Calabria	North Carolina
Jeff McInnis	North Carolina
