= 1995 MEAC men's basketball tournament =

- Classification: Division I
- Season: 1994–95
- Teams: 9
- Site: Talmadge L. Hill Field House; Baltimore, Maryland
- Champions: North Carolina A&T (15th title)
- Winning coach: Roy Thomas (1st title)
- MVP: Phillip Allen (North Carolina A&T)

1994–95 MEAC men's basketball standings
	Conf.				Overall
Team	W		L	PCT	W		L	PCT
Coppin State	15	–	1	.938	21	–	10	.677
South Carolina State	11	–	5	.688	15	–	13	.536
North Carolina A&T †	10	–	6	.625	15	–	15	.500
Maryland Eastern Shore	9	–	7	.563	13	–	14	.481
Bethune–Cookman	9	–	7	.563	12	–	16	.429
Howard	8	–	8	.500	9	–	18	.333
Morgan State	5	–	11	.313	5	–	22	.185
Delaware State	3	–	13	.188	7	–	21	.250
Florida A&M	2	–	14	.125	5	–	22	.185
† 1995 MEAC tournament winner Rankings from AP Poll

The 1995 Mid-Eastern Athletic Conference men's basketball tournament took place February 28–March 3, 1995, at the Talmadge L. Hill Field House in Baltimore, Maryland. North Carolina A&T defeated Coppin State, 66–64 in the championship game, to win its 15th MEAC Tournament title.

The Aggies earned an automatic bid to the 1995 NCAA tournament as No. 16 seed in the Southeast region. In the round of 64, North Carolina A&T fell to No. 1 seed Wake Forest 79–47.

== Format ==
All nine conference members participated, with the top 7 teams receiving a bye to the quarterfinal round.

== Bracket ==
First round February 28
8	Delaware State	100
9	Florida A&M	73

Quarterfinals; March 1
1	Coppin State	83
8	Delaware State	57
4	Bethune–Cookman	78
5	Maryland Eastern Shore	71
3	North Carolina A&T	69
6	Howard	66
2	South Carolina State	82
7	Morgan State	72

Semifinals; March 2
1	Coppin State	88
4	Bethune-Cookman	75
3	North Carolina A&T	70
2	South Carolina State	60

Final; March 3
1	Coppin State	64
3	North Carolina A&T	66
