= Dave Odom =

American basketball coach (born 1942)

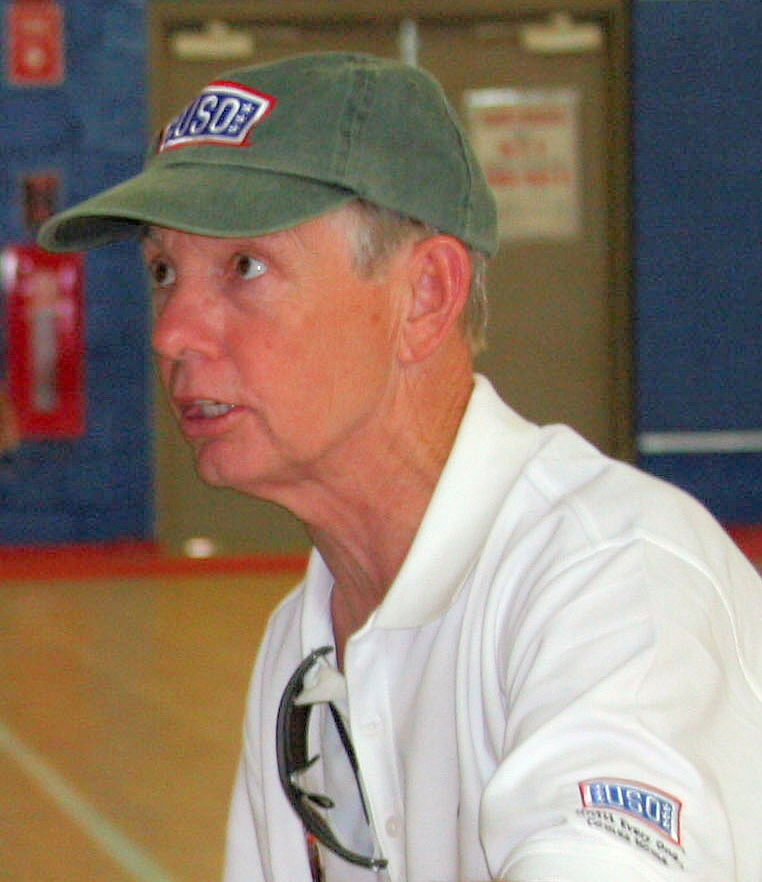
- Odom in 2006

Biographical details
- Born: October 9, 1942 (age 84); Goldsboro, North Carolina, U.S.

Playing career
- 1961–1965: Guilford

Coaching career (HC unless noted)
- 1965–1967: Goldsboro HS (NC) (assistant)
- 1967–1969: Goldsboro HS (NC)
- 1969–1976: Durham HS (NC)
- 1976–1979: Wake Forest (assistant)
- 1979–1982: East Carolina
- 1982–1989: Virginia (assistant)
- 1989–2001: Wake Forest
- 2001–2008: South Carolina

Head coaching record
- Overall: 406–278 (college)
- Tournaments: 10–9 (NCAA Division I); 21–3 (NIT)

Accomplishments and honors

Championships
- 3 NIT (2000, 2005, 2006); 2 ACC tournament (1995, 1996); ACC regular season (1995)

Awards
- 3× ACC Coach of the Year (1991, 1994, 1995); SEC Coach of the Year (2004)

George David Odom (born October 9, 1942) is an American retired men's college basketball coach. He served as the head coach of the East Carolina Pirates, Wake Forest Demon Deacons, and South Carolina Gamecocks.

== Playing career ==
Odom began his career in sports at Goldsboro High School, in North Carolina, as the captain of his basketball and baseball teams. After graduating in 1961, he attended Guilford College where he played quarterback on the football team for three years, as well as playing basketball for all four years. As a senior in 1965, Odom was named the college's most outstanding athlete. He was also inducted into the Guilford College Athletics Hall of Fame in 1983. Pete Maravich remarked late in his life that he had patterned many of his signature moves off of Odom's game.

== Early career ==
After graduation in 1965, Odom accepted a job as the coach of Goldsboro High School while enrolled at East Carolina University in pursuit of a master's degree in physical education. Odom coached Goldsboro High School for four seasons between 1965 and 1969; he was also a drivers ed instructor during this time. After graduating from East Carolina in 1969, Odom took a job at Durham High School. He coached at Durham for seven years (1969–1976) where he was voted his league's coach of the year five times.

== Early collegiate career ==
Odom began his collegiate coaching career as an assistant at Wake Forest University in 1976 under head coach Carl Tacy. After three years at Wake Forest (1976–1979), Odom became the head coach at East Carolina University, where his squad compiled a 16–11 record, the university's best since 1965. Odom stayed with the program until 1982, when he was offered a chance to return to the Atlantic Coast Conference (ACC) as an assistant at the University of Virginia.

As an assistant at Virginia (1982–1989) under head coach Terry Holland, Odom participated in some of the university's most successful seasons, including five National Collegiate Athletic Association berths and a trip to the Final Four in 1984. During this time, Odom coached future No. 1 NBA draft pick Ralph Sampson, who graduated in 1983. Odom served as acting head coach when Holland missed several games due to illness in the 1988–1989 season. Odom left Virginia in 1989 to return to Winston-Salem as the head coach of Wake Forest University.

== Wake Forest ==
Upon his arrival in Winston-Salem, Odom inherited a team that had suffered four straight losing seasons under head coach Bob Staak. In his 12 seasons (1989–2001) as head coach, Odom compiled a record of 240–132, making him the second-highest winning coach in Wake Forest history, as well as the second highest winning percentage in school history. During this time, Wake Forest earned 7 straight NCAA Tournament appearances and one National Invitation Tournament (NIT) championship.

Odom was named ACC coach of the year in 1991, 1994 and 1995. He led his team to consecutive ACC Championships in 1995 and 1996. Much of the success during these two years is attributed to star center Tim Duncan, whom he recruited as a player in the U.S. Virgin Islands in 1994. In 1995, led by Duncan, the team put up a 26–6 overall record, including winning the ACC tournament by defeating North Carolina by the score of 82–80, with the victory coming from a last second shot by point guard Randolph Childress. In 1996, the team successfully defended its title with a record of 26–6 by defeating Georgia Tech by a score of 75–74.

== South Carolina ==
Odom left Wake Forest to accept the job as head coach of the University of South Carolina in 2001, replacing former coach Eddie Fogler. During his tenure at South Carolina, his team earned one NCAA tournament bid, and made three appearances in the NIT, winning the championship in 2005 and 2006. He was named SEC Coach of the Year in 2004. On January 2, 2008, Odom coached his 400th collegiate victory as a head coach. Later that month, on January 18, he announced that he would retire at the end of the 2007–2008 basketball season, his seventh at South Carolina. He coached his final game for South Carolina on March 14, 2008, in the SEC tournament.

== Personal ==
Odom is the father of UVa head coach Ryan Odom.

== Head coaching record ==
Record table
Season	Team	Overall	Conference	Standing	Postseason
East Carolina Pirates (Independent) (1979–1982)
1979–80	East Carolina	16–11			
1980–81	East Carolina	12–14			
1981–82	East Carolina	10–17			
East Carolina:		38–42 (.475)			
Wake Forest Demon Deacons (Atlantic Coast Conference) (1989–2001)
1989–90	Wake Forest	12–16	3–11	8th	
1990–91	Wake Forest	19–11	8–6	T–3rd	NCAA Division I Second Round
1991–92	Wake Forest	17–12	7–9	6th	NCAA Division I First Round
1992–93	Wake Forest	21–9	10–6	T–3rd	NCAA Division I Sweet 16
1993–94	Wake Forest	21–12	9–7	3rd	NCAA Division I Second Round
1994–95	Wake Forest	26–6	12–4	T–1st	NCAA Division I Sweet 16
1995–96	Wake Forest	26–6	12–4	2nd	NCAA Division I Elite Eight
1996–97	Wake Forest	24–7	11–5	T–2nd	NCAA Division I Second Round
1997–98	Wake Forest	16–14	7–9	T–4th	NIT Second Round
1998–99	Wake Forest	17–14	7–9	4th	NIT Second Round
1999–00	Wake Forest	22–14	7–9	5th	NIT champions
2000–01	Wake Forest	19–11	8–8	5th	NCAA Division I First Round
Wake Forest:		240–132 (.645)	101–87 (.537)		
South Carolina Gamecocks (Southeastern Conference) (2001–2008)
2001–02	South Carolina	22–15	6–10	T–5th (East)	NIT Runner Up
2002–03	South Carolina	12–16	5–11	5th (East)	
2003–04	South Carolina	23–11	8–8	3rd (East)	NCAA Division I First Round
2004–05	South Carolina	20–13	7–9	T–4th (East)	NIT champions
2005–06	South Carolina	23–15	6–10	5th (East)	NIT champions
2006–07	South Carolina	14–16	4–12	6th (East)	
2007–08	South Carolina	14–18	5–11	5th (East)	
South Carolina:		128–104 (.552)	41–71 (.366)		
Total:		406–278 (.594)			
National champion Postseason invitational champion Conference regular season champion Conference regular season and conference tournament champion Division regular season champion Division regular season and conference tournament champion Conference tournament champion
