= 1994–95 North Carolina A&T Aggies men's basketball team =

American college basketball season

1994–95 North Carolina A&T Aggies men's basketball

MEAC tournament champions

NCAA tournament, first round
- Conference: Mid-Eastern Athletic Conference
- Record: 15–15 (10–6 MEAC)
- Head coach: Roy Thomas (1st season)
- Home arena: Corbett Sports Center

1994–95 MEAC men's basketball standings
	Conf.				Overall
Team	W		L	PCT	W		L	PCT
Coppin State	15	–	1	.938	21	–	10	.677
South Carolina State	11	–	5	.688	15	–	13	.536
North Carolina A&T †	10	–	6	.625	15	–	15	.500
Maryland Eastern Shore	9	–	7	.563	13	–	14	.481
Bethune–Cookman	9	–	7	.563	12	–	16	.429
Howard	8	–	8	.500	9	–	18	.333
Morgan State	5	–	11	.313	5	–	22	.185
Delaware State	3	–	13	.188	7	–	21	.250
Florida A&M	2	–	14	.125	5	–	22	.185
† 1995 MEAC tournament winner Rankings from AP Poll

The 1994–95 North Carolina A&T Aggies men's basketball team represented North Carolina Agricultural and Technical State University during the 1994–95 NCAA Division I men's basketball season. The Aggies, led by first-year head coach Roy Thomas, played their home games at the Corbett Sports Center as members of the Mid-Eastern Athletic Conference. They finished the season 15–15, 10–6 in MEAC play to finish in third place. They were champions of the MEAC tournament, winning the championship game over Coppin State, to earn an automatic bid to the 1995 NCAA tournament. Playing as No. 16 seed in the East region, they were defeated by No. 1 seed Wake Forest, 79–47, in the opening round.

== Roster ==
1994–95 North Carolina A&T Aggies men's basketball team
Players	Coaches
Pos. / # / Name / Height / Weight / Year / Hometown; G / / Phillip Allen / 6 ft 2 in (1.88 m) / — / Sr	Head coach: Roy Thomas; Assistant coach(es) Legend: (C) Team captain; (S) Suspended; (I) Ineligible; (W) Walk-on; Injured; Current redshirt; Roster

== Schedule and results ==
Date time, TV	Rank^{#}	Opponent^{#}	Result	Record	Site (attendance) city, state
Regular season
Nov 30, 1994*		at No. 23 Virginia	L 50–94	1–1	University Hall; Charlottesville, Virginia
Dec 3, 1994*		North Carolina Central	W 93–87	2–1	Corbett Sports Center; Greensboro, North Carolina
Dec 6, 1994*		at George Mason	L 90–98 ^{2OT}	2–2	Patriot Center; Fairfax, Virginia
Dec 19, 1994*		at No. 9 Duke	L 56–99	2–4	Cameron Indoor Stadium; Durham, North Carolina
Jan 3, 1995*		at Saint Peter's	L 52–66	2–5	Yanitelli Center; Jersey City, New Jersey
Feb 15, 1995*		at No. 20 Georgia Tech	L 81–85	10–12	Alexander Memorial Coliseum; Atlanta, Georgia
Feb 25, 1995		at South Carolina State	W 69–52	12–14 (10–6)	SHM Memorial Center; Orangeburg, South Carolina
MEAC tournament
Mar 1, 1995*		vs. Howard; Quarterfinals	W 69–66 ^{OT}	13–14	Talmadge L. Hill Field House; Baltimore, Maryland
Mar 2, 1995*		vs. South Carolina State; Semifinals	W 70–60	14–14	Talmadge L. Hill Field House; Baltimore, Maryland
Mar 3, 1995*		vs. Coppin State; Championship game	W 66–64	15–14	Talmadge L. Hill Field House; Baltimore, Maryland
NCAA tournament
Mar 16, 1995*	(16 E)	vs. (1 E) No. 3 Wake Forest; First round	L 47–79	15–15	Baltimore Arena; Baltimore, Maryland
*Non-conference game. ^{#}Rankings from AP poll. (#) Tournament seedings in parentheses. E=East. All times are in Eastern Time.
