= 1994–95 Maryland Terrapins men's basketball team =

American college basketball season

1994–95 Maryland Terrapins men's basketball

ACC Regular Season Co-Champions

NCAA tournament, Sweet Sixteen
- Conference: Atlantic Coast Conference

Ranking
- Coaches: No. 11
- AP: No. 10
- Record: 26–8 (12–4 ACC)
- Head coach: Gary Williams (6th season)
- Assistant coaches: Billy Hahn; Jimmy Patsos
- Home arena: Cole Field House

1994–95 ACC men's basketball standings
	Conf.				Overall
Team	W		L	PCT	W		L	PCT
No. 3 Wake Forest †	12	–	4	.750	26	–	6	.813
No. 4 North Carolina	12	–	4	.750	28	–	6	.824
No. 10 Maryland	12	–	4	.750	26	–	8	.765
No. 13 Virginia	12	–	4	.750	25	–	9	.735
Georgia Tech	8	–	8	.500	18	–	12	.600
Florida State	5	–	11	.313	12	–	15	.444
Clemson	5	–	11	.313	15	–	13	.536
NC State	4	–	12	.250	12	–	15	.444
Duke	2	–	14	.125	13	–	18	.419
† 1995 ACC tournament winner Rankings from AP poll

The 1994–95 Maryland Terrapins Men's Basketball Team represented the University of Maryland in the 1994–95 season. Led by head coach Gary Williams, the Terrapins had their one of their first majorly successful seasons under Williams. This season is regarded as one of the first steppingstones to establishing the Terps as the national powerhouse that they would eventually become. This season, they shared the ACC regular season title, and even though they improved on their previous seasons' record of 18–12, they matched their postseason result of the previous year making it to the NCAA's Sweet Sixteen.

== Roster ==
1994–95 Maryland Terrapins men's basketball team
Players
Coaches

Pos.	#	Name	Height	Weight	Year	Hometown
G	3	Matt Raydo	5 ft 10 in (1.78 m)	160 lb (73 kg)	So	Fort Lauderdale, Florida
F	4	Exree Hipp	6 ft 8 in (2.03 m)	205 lb (93 kg)	Jr	Washington, D.C.
G	10	Duane Simpkins	6 ft 0 in (1.83 m)	172 lb (78 kg)	Jr	Fort Washington, Maryland
G	11	Matt Kovarik	6 ft 5 in (1.96 m)	185 lb (84 kg)	So	Greensboro, North Carolina
F	12	Donny Judd	6 ft 5 in (1.96 m)	185 lb (84 kg)	Sr	Forestville, Maryland
G	13	Šarūnas Jasikevičius	6 ft 4 in (1.93 m)	202 lb (92 kg)	Fr	Kaunas, Lithuania
G	15	Johnny Rhodes	6 ft 4 in (1.93 m)	205 lb (93 kg)	Jr	Washington, D.C.
F	21	Mario Lucas	6 ft 8 in (2.03 m)	233 lb (106 kg)	Jr	Memphis, Tennessee
SF	22	Keith Booth	6 ft 6 in (1.98 m)	225 lb (102 kg)	So	Baltimore, Maryland
F	25	Rodney Elliott	6 ft 8 in (2.03 m)	207 lb (94 kg)	Fr	Baltimore, Maryland
G	31	Wayne Bristol	6 ft 1 in (1.85 m)	185 lb (84 kg)	Sr	Beltsville, Maryland
C	32	Joe Smith	6 ft 9 in (2.06 m)	220 lb (100 kg)	So	Norfolk, Virginia
F	55	Kurtis Shultz	6 ft 5 in (1.96 m)	235 lb (107 kg)	Sr	Randallstown, Maryland

Head coach

- Gary Williams (Maryland)

Assistant coach(es)

Legend

- (C) Team captain
- (S) Suspended
- (I) Ineligible
- (W) Walk-on
- Injured
- Current redshirt

Roster

== Tournament results ==
ACC Tournament
Quarterfinals Vs. Florida State - W, 71-64 @ Greensboro Coliseum, Greensboro, NC
Semifinals Vs. North Carolina - L, 92-97 OT @ Greensboro Coliseum, Greensboro, NC
NCAA Tournament
First Round Vs. Gonzaga - W, 87-63 @ Jon M. Huntsman Center, Salt Lake City, UT
Round of 32 Vs. Texas - W, 82-68 @ Jon M. Huntsman Center, Salt Lake City, UT
Sweet Sixteen Vs. Connecticut - L, 89-99 @ Oracle Arena, Oakland, CA

== Awards and honors ==
- Joe Smith – National Player of the Year, Consensus First-team All-American, ACC Player of the Year
