= 1994–95 Virginia Cavaliers men's basketball team =

American college basketball season

1994–95 Virginia Cavaliers men's basketball

ACC Regular season Co Champions

NCAA tournament, Elite Eight
- Conference: Atlantic Coast Conference

Ranking
- Coaches: No. 8
- AP: No. 13
- Record: 25–9 (12–4 ACC)
- Head coach: Jeff Jones (5th season)
- Assistant coaches: Anthony Solomon (1st season); Tom Perrin (8th season); Pete Herrmann (1st season)
- Home arena: University Hall

1994–95 ACC men's basketball standings
	Conf.				Overall
Team	W		L	PCT	W		L	PCT
No. 3 Wake Forest †	12	–	4	.750	26	–	6	.813
No. 4 North Carolina	12	–	4	.750	28	–	6	.824
No. 10 Maryland	12	–	4	.750	26	–	8	.765
No. 13 Virginia	12	–	4	.750	25	–	9	.735
Georgia Tech	8	–	8	.500	18	–	12	.600
Florida State	5	–	11	.313	12	–	15	.444
Clemson	5	–	11	.313	15	–	13	.536
NC State	4	–	12	.250	12	–	15	.444
Duke	2	–	14	.125	13	–	18	.419
† 1995 ACC tournament winner Rankings from AP poll

The 1994–95 Virginia Cavaliers men's basketball team represented University of Virginia as a member of the Atlantic Coast Conference during the 1994–95 NCAA Division I men's basketball season. The team was led by third-year head coach Jeff Jones. The Cavaliers earned an at-large bid to the NCAA tournament as No. 4 seed in the East region. They defeated Nicholls State in the opening round, No. 12 seed Miami (OH) in the second round, and Kansas to reach the Elite Eight before falling to No. 2 seed Arkansas. The Cavaliers finished with a record of 25–9 (12–4 ACC).

== Roster ==
1994–95 Virginia Cavaliers men's basketball team
Players
Coaches

Pos.	#	Name	Height	Weight	Year	Hometown
PF	4	Junior Burrough	6 ft 8 in (2.03 m)	242 lb (110 kg)	Sr	Charlotte, North Carolina
G	5	Curtis Staples	6 ft 3 in (1.91 m)	175 lb (79 kg)	Fr	Roanoke, Virginia
PG	12	Cory Alexander	6 ft 1 in (1.85 m)	183 lb (83 kg)	RS Jr	Waynesboro, Virginia
G/F	13	Jamal Robinson	6 ft 7 in (2.01 m)	182 lb (83 kg)	So	Queens, New York
G	21	Harold Deane	6 ft 1 in (1.85 m)	177 lb (80 kg)	So	Ettrick, Virginia
G/F	22	Jason Williford	6 ft 6 in (1.98 m)	212 lb (96 kg)	Sr	Richmond, Virginia
F/C	24	Yuri Barnes	6 ft 8 in (2.03 m)	231 lb (105 kg)	Sr	Richmond, Virginia
F	25	Norman Nolan	6 ft 8 in (2.03 m)	242 lb (110 kg)	Fr	Baltimore, Maryland
F/C	30	Chris Alexander	6 ft 9 in (2.06 m)	227 lb (103 kg)	RS Jr	Long Branch, New Jersey
C	42	Chase Metheney	7 ft 4 in (2.24 m)	221 lb (100 kg)	Fr	Charlotte, North Carolina
G/F	44	Maurice Watkins	6 ft 5 in (1.96 m)	199 lb (90 kg)	RS So	Petersburg, Virginia
G	45	Percy Ellsworth	6 ft 3 in (1.91 m)	199 lb (90 kg)	RS So	Drewryville, Virginia
F	55	Martin Walton	6 ft 9 in (2.06 m)	215 lb (98 kg)	So	Portsmouth, Virginia

Head coach

- Jeff Jones

Assistant coach(es)

- Anthony Solomon
- Tom Perrin
- Pete Herrmann

Legend

- (C) Team captain
- (S) Suspended
- (I) Ineligible
- (W) Walk-on
- Injured
- Current redshirt

Roster

== Schedule and results ==
Date time, TV	Rank^{#}	Opponent^{#}	Result	Record	Site (attendance) city, state
Regular season
Nov 16, 1994*	No. 10	Old Dominion	W 83–80	1–0	University Hall; Charlottesville, Virginia
Nov 17, 1994*	No. 10	Ohio	L 83–94	1–1	University Hall; Charlottesville, Virginia
Nov 30, 1994*	No. 23	North Carolina A&T	W 94–50	2–1	University Hall; Charlottesville, Virginia
Dec 3, 1994*	No. 23	Towson State	W 94–66	3–1	University Hall; Charlottesville, Virginia
Dec 6, 1994*	No. 20	at Vanderbilt	L 65–70	3–2	Memorial Gymnasium; Nashville, Tennessee
Dec 8, 1994*	No. 20	Bethune-Cookman	W 109–49	4–2	University Hall; Charlottesville, Virginia
Dec 10, 1994*	No. 20	at Rice	W 67–50	5–2	Tudor Fieldhouse; Houston, Texas
Dec 19, 1994*	No. 22	Virginia Military Institute	W 100–73	6–2	University Hall; Charlottesville, Virginia
Dec 22, 1994*	No. 22	Stanford	L 60–64	6–3	University Hall; Charlottesville, Virginia
Jan 4, 1995		at Florida State	W 81–75	7–3 (1–0)	Donald L. Tucker Center; Tallahassee, Florida
Jan 7, 1995		at NC State	W 76–65	8–3 (2–0)	Reynolds Coliseum; Raleigh, North Carolina
Jan 11, 1995		No. 18 Clemson	W 61–37	9–3 (3–0)	University Hall; Charlottesville, Virginia
Jan 14, 1995		at No. 16 Duke	W 91–88 ^{2OT}	10–3 (4–0)	Cameron Indoor Stadium; Durham, North Carolina
Jan 18, 1995	No. 18	at No. 3 North Carolina	L 76–79	10–4 (4–1)	Dean Smith Center; Chapel Hill, North Carolina
Jan 22, 1995	No. 18	No. 22 Georgia Tech	W 88–85 ^{2OT}	11–4 (5–1)	University Hall; Charlottesville, Virginia
Jan 25, 1995	No. 15	No. 16 Wake Forest	L 70–71	11–5 (5–2)	University Hall; Charlottesville, Virginia
Jan 28, 1995*	No. 15	George Mason	W 128–98	12–5	University Hall; Charlottesville, Virginia
Feb 1, 1995	No. 15	at No. 5 Maryland	L 62–71	12–6 (5–3)	Cole Fieldhouse; College Park, Maryland
Feb 4, 1995		vs. Florida State	W 76–63 ^{OT}	13–6 (6–3)	University Hall; Charlottesville, Virginia
Feb 8, 1995	No. 17	NC State	W 65–55	14–6 (7–3)	University Hall; Charlottesville, Virginia
Feb 11, 1995	No. 17	at Clemson	W 62–44	15–6 (8–3)	Littlejohn Coliseum; Clemson, South Carolina
Feb 12, 1995*	No. 17	UNLV	W 75–65	16–6	University Hall; Charlottesville, Virginia
Feb 15, 1995	No. 16	Duke	W 64–58	17–6 (9–3)	University Hall; Charlottesville, Virginia
Feb 19, 1995	No. 16	No. 2 North Carolina	W 73–71	18–6 (10–3)	University Hall; Charlottesville, Virginia
Feb 22, 1995	No. 11	at No. 24 Georgia Tech	W 83–60	19–6 (11–3)	Alexander Memorial Coliseum; Atlanta, Georgia
Feb 26, 1995	No. 11	at No. 10 Wake Forest	L 63–66	19–7 (11–4)	Lawrence Joel Coliseum; Winston-Salem, North Carolina
Feb 28, 1995*	No. 13	vs. Virginia Tech	W 63–62	20–7	Richmond Coliseum; Richmond, Virginia
Mar 5, 1995	No. 13	No. 6 Maryland	W 92–67	21–7 (12–4)	University Hall; Charlottesville, Virginia
ACC Tournament
Mar 10, 1995*	(4) No. 11	vs. (5) Georgia Tech; Quarterfinals	W 77–67	22–7	Greensboro Coliseum; Greensboro, North Carolina
Mar 11, 1995*	(4) No. 11	vs. (1) No. 7 Wake Forest; Semifinals	L 68–77	22–8	Greensboro Coliseum; Greensboro, North Carolina
NCAA tournament
Mar 16, 1995*	(4 MW) No. 13	vs. (13 MW) Nicholls State; First Round	W 96–72	23–8	University of Dayton Arena; Dayton, Ohio
Mar 18, 1995*	(4 MW) No. 13	vs. (12 MW) Miami (OH); Second Round	W 60–54 ^{OT}	24–8	University of Dayton Arena; Dayton, Ohio
Mar 24, 1995*	(4 MW) No. 13	vs. (1 MW) No. 5 Kansas; Midwest Regional Semifinal – Sweet Sixteen	W 67–58	25–8	Kemper Arena; Kansas City, Missouri
Mar 26, 1995*	(4 MW) No. 13	vs. (2 MW) No. 6 Arkansas; Midwest Regional Final – Elite Eight	L 61–68	25–9	Kemper Arena; Kansas City, Missouri
*Non-conference game. ^{#}Rankings from AP poll. (#) Tournament seedings in parentheses. MW=Midwest. All times are in Eastern time.
