= Pete Gaudet =

American college basketball coach (born 1942)

Biographical details
- Born: March 27, 1942 (age 84)

Coaching career (HC unless noted)
- 1980–1982: Army
- 1982–1995: Duke (assistant)
- 1995: Duke (interim HC)

Head coaching record
- Overall: 16–56

Accomplishments and honors

Championships
- As assistant coach: 2 NCAA Division I tournament (1991, 1992)

Peter James Gaudet (born March 27, 1942) is an American college basketball coach. He played varsity basketball for Iona Prep in 1959 and 1960 before going to Boston University, where he graduated in 1966.

He began his collegiate coaching career as an assistant to Mike Krzyzewski at Army. When Krzyzewski left for Duke in 1980, Gaudet was named his successor as head coach.

After leaving Duke, Gaudet worked as an assistant men's basketball coach for the Vanderbilt Commodores men's basketball program before moving as an assistant to the women's basketball programs at Vanderbilt and Ohio State.

== At Duke ==
After leaving the Army program in 1982, Gaudet rejoined his former boss at Duke, serving as Krzyzewski's top assistant from 1982 to 1995. During this time, Gaudet worked alongside current Harvard head coach Tommy Amaker, current ESPN analyst Jay Bilas, current Atlanta Hawks assistant coach Mike Brey, and current Atlanta Hawks head coach Quin Snyder. He helped lead Duke to two NCAA men's championships and seven Final Four appearances. An expert in player development, Gaudet coached eight All-Americans, three National Players of the Year and 12 NBA draft picks.

When Krzyzewski took a leave of absence in early 1995 due to a back injury, Gaudet was promoted to interim head coach. He inherited a team that had started 9–3, but the team struggled to an eventual record of 13–18 overall and 2–14 in the ACC—still the most losses in school history. Despite Gaudet's interim status, Duke credited the final 19 games of the season to him rather than to Krzyzewski, though Gaudet expresses no regrets or bitterness concerning this.

In the midst of a landmark class action lawsuit against the NCAA, Gaudet did not return to the Blue Devils' bench for the 1995–1996 season.

== Head coaching record ==
Record table
Season	Team	Overall	Conference	Standing	Postseason
Army Black Knights (Metro Atlantic Athletic Conference) (1980–1982)
1980–81	Army	7–19			
1981–82	Army	5–22			
Army:		12–41			
Duke Blue Devils (Atlantic Coast Conference) (1995)
1994–95	Duke	4–15	2–13	9th	
Duke:		4–15	2–13		
Total:		16–56			
