= Big Three (San Antonio Spurs) =

Tim Duncan, Tony Parker, and Manu Ginobili

"The Big Three"

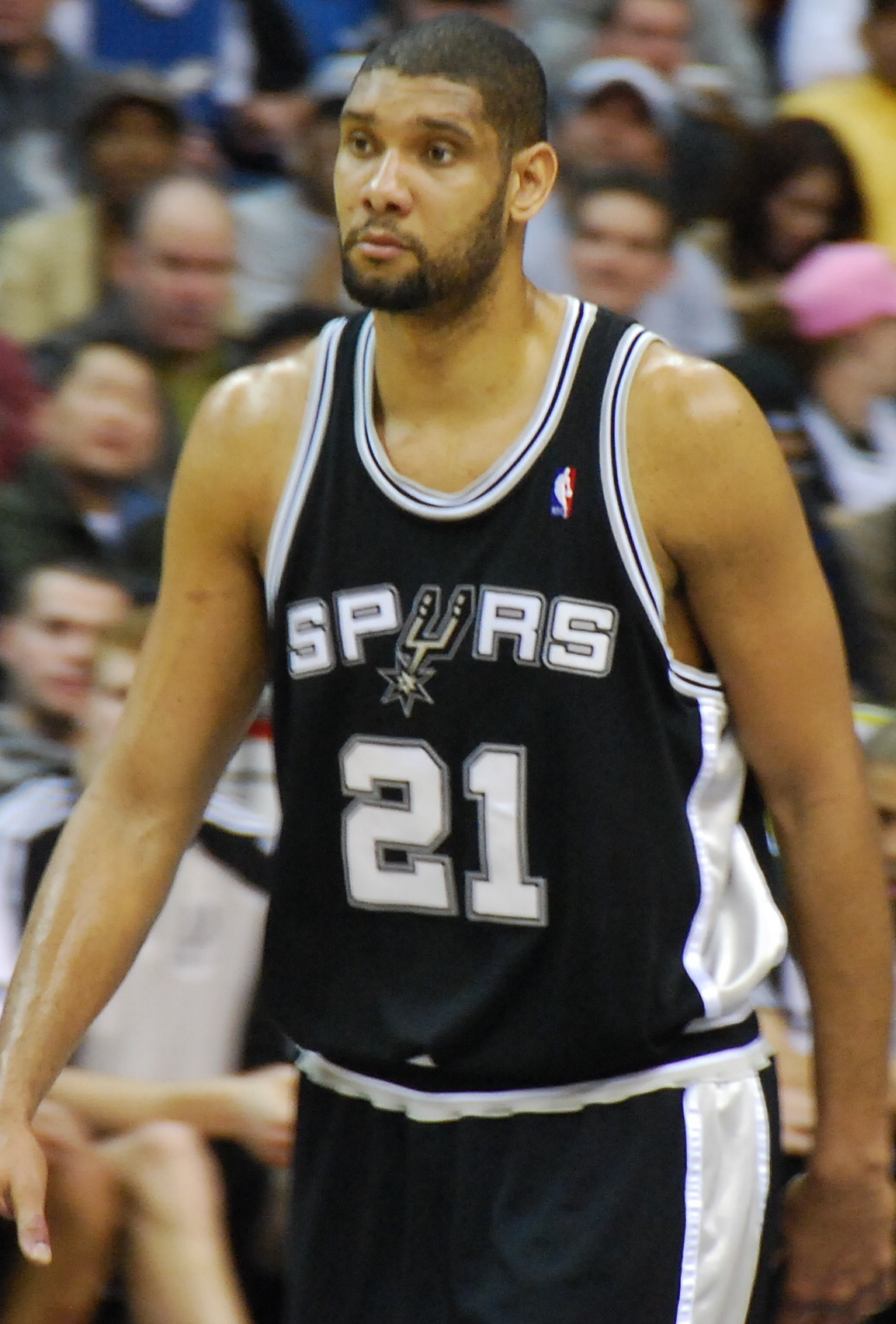
Tim Duncan

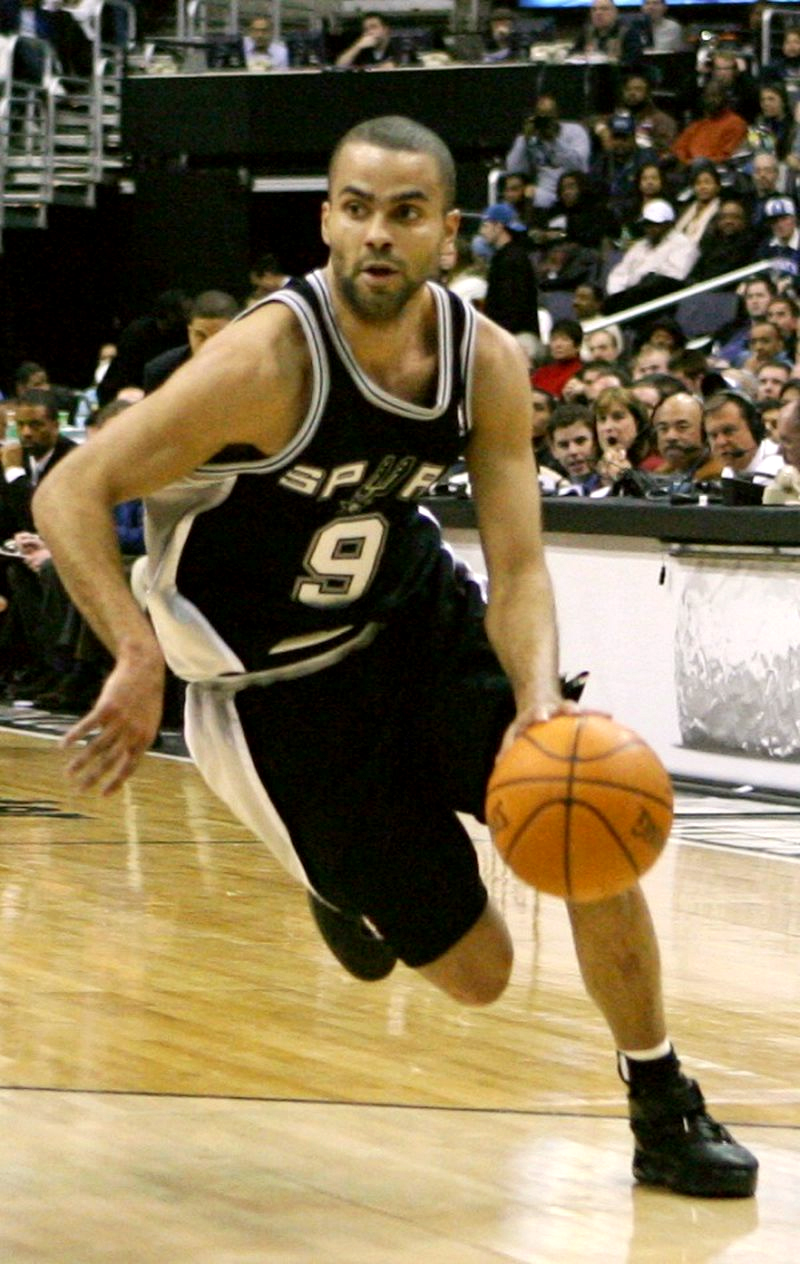
Tony Parker

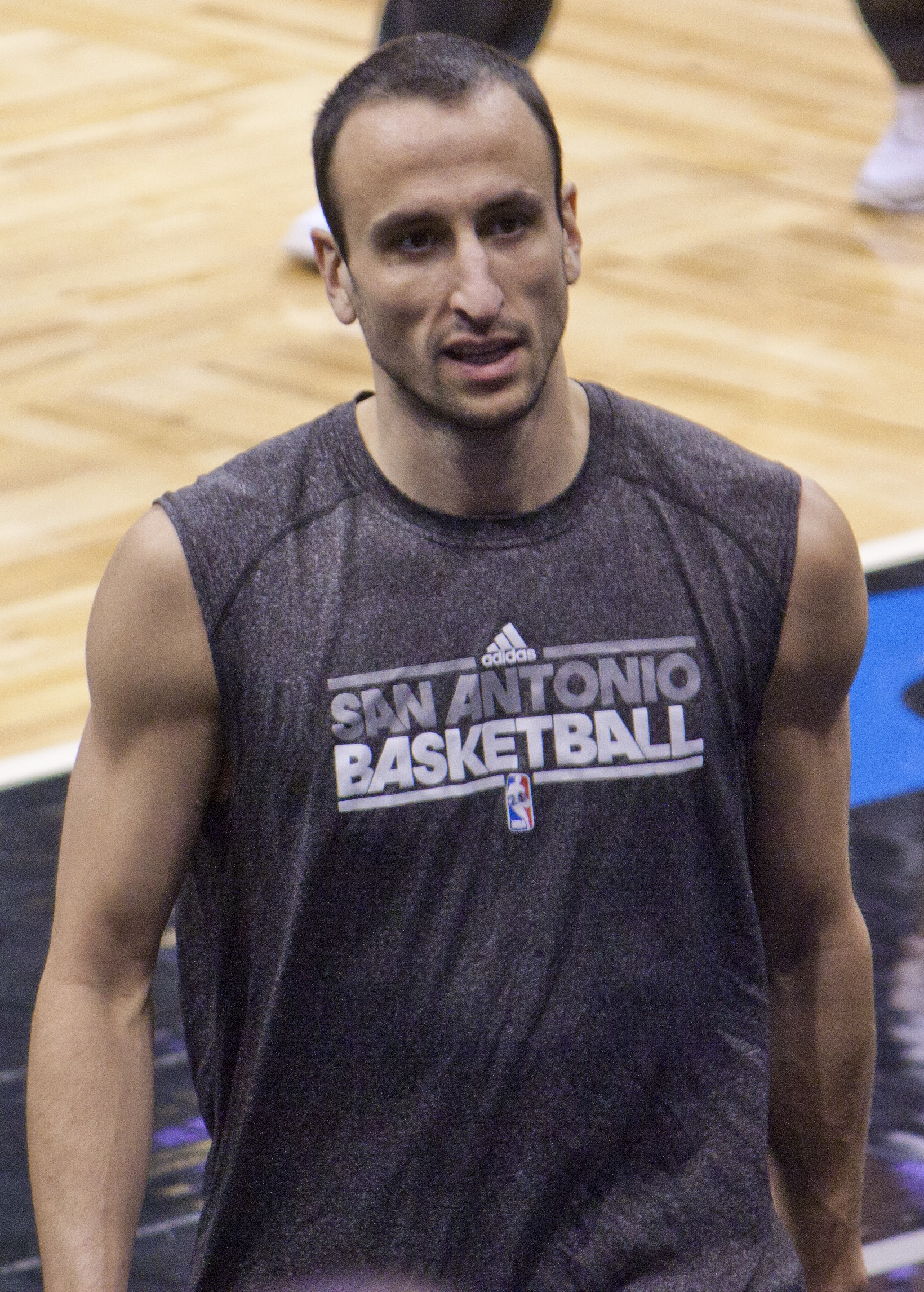
Manu Ginóbili

The Big Three was a trio of National Basketball Association players for the San Antonio Spurs from 2002 to 2016, which consisted of Tim Duncan, Tony Parker, and Manu Ginóbili. They would win four NBA championships (2003, 2005, 2007, 2014) during that time-span. Duncan and Ginóbili retired after the 2015–16 season and the 2017–18 season, respectively. Parker, after playing one season with the Charlotte Hornets, retired after the 2018–19 season. The Big Three is one of the most decorated and successful trios in NBA history, having won 575 regular season games and 126 postseason games together; they won fifty games in each season that the trio played together, and they won sixty games in a season five times. Each member of the trio has had their jersey retired by the Spurs and all three have been inducted into the Naismith Memorial Basketball Hall of Fame.

== Pre-"Big Three" ==
=== Tim Duncan ===
Before being selected number one overall by the San Antonio Spurs, Tim Duncan played college basketball for four years at Wake Forest. He was a two-time Atlantic Coast Conference (ACC) Men's Basketball Player of the Year, three-time NABC Defensive Player of the Year, and MVP of the 1996 ACC tournament. Duncan also won numerous national player of the year awards for his senior season at Wake Forest and was a two-time consensus first-team All-American. In 1996, Duncan led the ACC in scoring, rebounding, field goal percentage and blocked shots, becoming the first player in ACC history to do so. Wake Forest had a 97–31 record during his four years there. Duncan left Wake Forest as the all-time NCAA rebounding leader at the time. Duncan is one of only ten players to leave college with more than 2,000 career points and 1,500 career rebounds. He was also the first player in NCAA history to reach 1,500 points, 1,000 rebounds, 400 blocked shots and 200 assists.

The Spurs had an array of talent that collided with a fateful stroke of injury. In the 1996–97 NBA season, general manager Gregg Popovich (hired for the position in 1994 after having served as an assistant from 1988 to 1992) fired head coach Bob Hill after the team was 3–15 to start the year, one that saw David Robinson play six games before breaking his foot. Popovich, appointing himself as head coach, would lead them to a 20–62 record for dead last in the NBA, which resulted in them having the first overall pick in the 1997 NBA draft. With first overall pick in the 1997 NBA draft, the Spurs selected Duncan, joining David Robinson to form a frontcourt known as the "Twin Towers". The "Twin Towers" won two NBA titles during their six seasons together—in 1999 and 2003—with Duncan winning NBA Finals MVP both times. Duncan also was named NBA MVP during his final two seasons with David Robinson and was named to the All-NBA First Team in each of his six seasons. The "Twin Towers" were named Sportsman of the Year by Sports Illustrated in 2003.

=== Tony Parker ===
Tony Parker played two years with Paris Basket Racing prior to being selected 28th overall by the San Antonio Spurs in the 2001 NBA draft. Parker began his rookie season playing as the backup point guard to Antonio Daniels, eventually become the starting point guard for the San Antonio Spurs that season and played in 77 regular-season games, averaging 9.2 points, 4.3 assists, and 2.6 rebounds in 29.4 minutes per game in his rookie season. Parker led the Spurs in assists and steals during his rookie season and was named to the All-Rookie First team that season.

=== Manu Ginóbili ===
Manu Ginóbili played seven seasons internationally before joining the San Antonio Spurs. He started his professional career with the Andino Sports Club of the Argentine basketball league before being traded to his hometown team, Estudiantes de Bahía Blanca where he played for two seasons. Ginóbili then played his next four seasons in Italy. The first two seasons were with Basket Viola Reggio Calabria, where he, along with Brent Scott, Brian Oliver, and Sydney Johnson helped the team to promotion from the Italian 2nd Division to the Italian 1st Division. Manu Ginóbili was drafted 57th overall by the San Antonio Spurs in the 1999 NBA draft, but played three more seasons in Italy before joining the Spurs. He played his final two seasons in Italy for Kinder Bologna, where they were able to make it to the 2001 Italian Championship, the 2001 and 2002 Italian Cups; and the 2001 Euroleague, where he was named the EuroLeague Final Four MVP. He also won the Italian League MVP Award in 2000–01 and 2001–02 and was selected to three Italian League All-Star Games during his career in Italy.

== "Big Three" ==
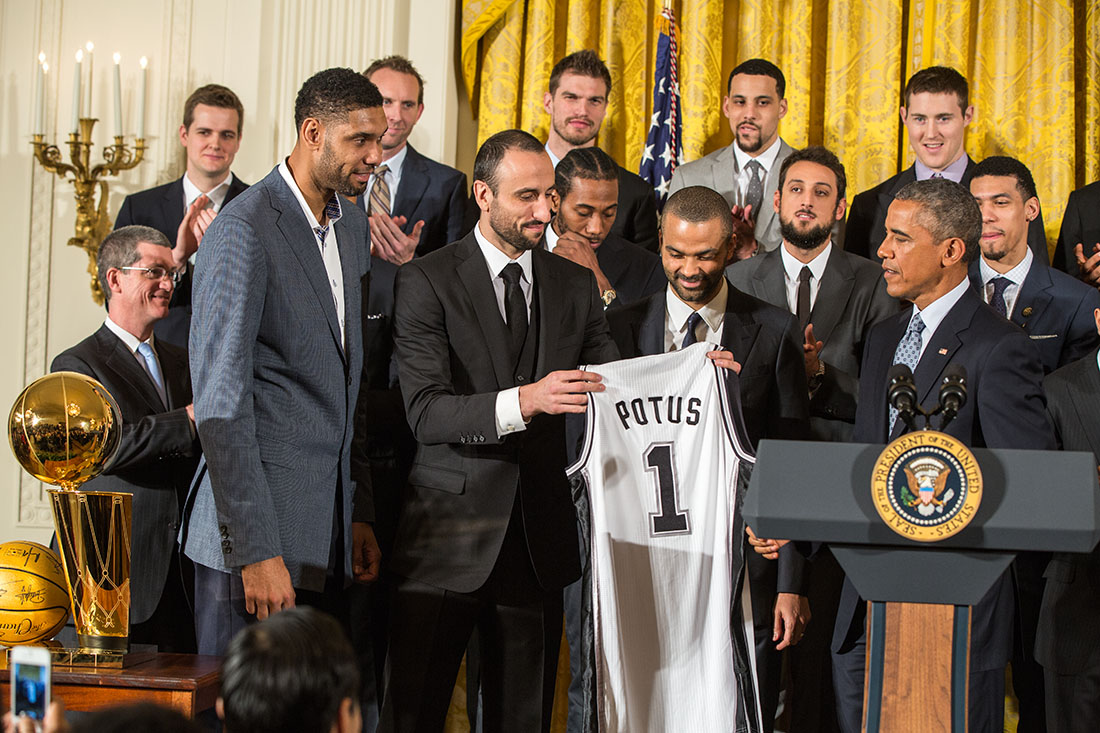
Tim Duncan, Manu Ginobili and Tony Parker present President Barack Obama with a Spurs team jersey during an event to welcome the 2014 NBA Champion San Antonio Spurs in the East Room of the White House, January 12, 2015.

=== 2002–03 season: 2nd Championship ===
The signing of Manu Ginóbili during the 2002–03 season started the moniker of the "Big Three". During their first season together the trio averaged a combined 47 points with Tim Duncan leading the way averaging 23.3 points, along with Tony Parker's 15.5 points and Manu Ginóbili's 7.7 points. As the trio continued, so did their contributions to the team. Parker jumped from nine points a game to averaging 15.5 while playing in all 82 games (the first of three seasons where he would play eighty games). Before the season, David Robinson announced he was planning to retire at the end of the season, signifying a transition from the "Twin Towers", a nickname given to the duo of Duncan and Robinson. Together, alongside role players like Bruce Bowen and Steve Kerr, the Spurs won an NBA-best 60–22 record and home-court advantage throughout the entire playoffs. In their first series, the Spurs defeated the Phoenix Suns in six games, setting up a second-round match-up with the Los Angeles Lakers. Having lost their last two postseason games to the Lakers, the Spurs were looking to avenge their previous losses against the Lakers. In Game 6, Duncan posted 37 points and 16 rebounds, as the Spurs won with a 110–82 victory and winning the series. Following the game, Spurs head coach Gregg Popovich said: "I thought in Game 5 and Game 6, he [Duncan] was astounding in his focus. He pulled everyone along these last two games." After moving past the Lakers, the Spurs defeated the Dallas Mavericks in a six-game series in the Western Conference Finals to advance to the 2003 NBA Finals against the New Jersey Nets. The Spurs were able to close out the series in Game 6 off the back of Duncan, who recorded a triple-double, securing the franchise's second title in four years. Duncan was a notable performer throughout the series, averaging 28 points and 16 rebounds, and was subsequently named Finals MVP. Following the NBA Finals victory, Duncan said: "We were all confident that something would happen, that we would turn the game to our favor, and it did." Duncan also expressed sadness over the impending retirement of his friend and teammate David Robinson.

=== 2003–04 season: Derek Fisher's shot ===
Despite changes to the team, the Spurs were consistent enough to go 57–25 on the year, finishing one game behind the Minnesota Timberwolves for the Midwest Division title and the best record in the Western Conference. Their strong regular season play secured them a trip to the NBA Playoffs and a first-round match-up with the Memphis Grizzlies. The Spurs promptly swept the Grizzlies and advanced to a fourth consecutive conference semifinal match-up with the Los Angeles Lakers. The Spurs and the Lakers split the first four games of the series with the home team winning every game. In Game 5, Duncan continued to play in the series, making a jump shot with 0.4 seconds remaining to give the Spurs a 73–72 lead. However, with a fraction of a second left on the clock, Derek Fisher hit a buzzer-beater to give the Lakers a 74–73 win. The Spurs lost Game 6 to the Lakers, 88–76 and were eliminated from the playoffs.

=== 2004–05 season: 3rd Championship ===
The following season, the Spurs, now playing in the Southwest Division, handily won the division title with a 59–23 record, securing the second seed in the Western Conference. The Spurs began the playoffs by defeating the Denver Nuggets in five games, with each of the trio being key contributors in the series. In the conference semifinal series against the Seattle SuperSonics, the Spurs split the first four games of the series. In Game 5, Ginóbili returned to the starting lineup and posted a playoff career-high 39 points. His effort was enough to help the Spurs to a 103–90 victory over the SuperSonics, putting them one game away from the Western Conference Finals. In Game 6, Duncan delivered in yet another pivotal moment, making a shot with 0.5 seconds left to break the game's tied score and lead the Spurs to a 98–96 victory. The Spurs then advanced to a match-up with the Phoenix Suns in the Western Conference Finals. In the series, Duncan, Ginóbili, and Parker averaged 27.4 points, 22.2 points, and 20.4 points, respectively. Bolstered by excellent performances from their three stars, the Spurs jumped out to a 3–0 lead in the series. In Games 3 and 4, the trio scored combined totals of 80 and 69 points. After losing Game 4 111–106, the trio delivered another performance; in Game 5, they scored a combined 68 points to help defeat the Suns and advance to the 2005 NBA Finals. In the Finals, they would face the defending champion Detroit Pistons. In a series where only one game had a team score 100 points and see five games where a team scored 79 or less, the Spurs would grind out a seven-game series that saw them win the first two games only to have Detroit match them going into Game 5. A late shot by Robert Horry helped win that game 96–95 to leave them one win away. Detroit won the sixth game 95–86 to set up Game 7. San Antonio trailed by one going into halftime; with seven minutes left in the third quarter, the Pistons led by nine points. However, the Spurs used the rest of the quarter to dig themselves out of the hole, and the score was tied at the start of the fourth quarter, with Duncan scoring ten points in that time. The Spurs would pull away late to win 81–74. Duncan averaged 20.6 points per game and 14.1 rebounds per game in the Finals, the best among both teams while being named Finals MVP; the victory marked the second NBA Championship of the "Big Three" era.

=== 2005–06 season ===
During the 2005–06 NBA season, the team roared to a franchise-best record of 63–19 and the best record in the Western Conference. That season, Parker, Duncan, and Ginóbili averaged 18.9, 18.6, and 15.1 points respectively. The Spurs began the playoffs with a six-game series win over the Sacramento Kings in the first round. They then faced the Dallas Mavericks in a tight battle for the Southwest Division title in the conference semifinals. Down 1-2 in the series, Duncan and Parker combined for 64 points in Game 4, but the Spurs still lost the game 123–118 in overtime and were on the brink of elimination. The main trio was a strong force in Game 5 as they combined for 81 points, 36 from Duncan, 27 from Parker, and 18 from Ginóbili. Their 98–97 win in Game 5 pulled the Spurs to a 3–2 series deficit in favor of the Mavericks. Duncan and Ginóbili came out strong in Game 6 as they combined for 54 points—Ginóbili had 30, Duncan had 24,—to tie the series at three games apiece and force a seventh game. Duncan had a 41-point performance in Game 7, but fell apart in overtime, making one of seven field goal attempts as the Spurs were eliminated in a 119–111 loss to the Mavericks.

=== 2006–07 season: 4th Championship ===
The Spurs went 23–8 in the 2006 parts of the 2006–07 season but went into the All-Star break 35–18. After that, they won the next 23 of 29 games to win over fifty games for another straight season. This time, however, it was not enough to win the Southwest Division, as the Dallas Mavericks won 67 games. The Spurs were the third seed in the Western Conference. The Spurs easily defeated the Denver Nuggets 4–1 in the first round to set up a matchup with the highest seed remaining in the second seed Phoenix Suns (Dallas had been upset in the first round). In the Conference Semifinals. Tim Duncan got the series started with his 33-point performance in Game 1 to win it and take a 1–0 series lead over the Suns. The Suns took Game 2 to even the series at one apiece but Duncan put on another 33-point performance in Game 3 to take a 2–1 series lead. The Suns won Game 4 to even the series at 2–2, but Game 5 went the way of the Spurs as they rallied from an eleven-point halftime deficit to win 88–85, with Ginóbili scoring 26. The trio combined for 87 points in Game 6, as Ginóbili scored 33, Parker scored thirty, and Duncan scored 24 to take a 114–106 win over the Suns to advance to the Conference Finals. The Western Conference Finals would be matched against the four seed Utah Jazz. In Game 1, the main trio for the Spurs combined for 71 points—27 from Duncan, 23 from Ginóbili, and 21 from Parker—to win Game 1 108–100 and take a 1–0 series lead. Duncan had a dominant performance in Game 2 with 26 points and fourteen rebounds which gave the Spurs a 105–96 win and a 2–0 series lead. The Jazz won Game 3 and in Game 4, Ginóbili had a 22-point performance with eleven of his fifteen fourth-quarter points coming from the free throw line to help the Spurs win Game 4 91–79 and take a 3–1 series lead. Aided by 21 points each from Duncan and Parker, the Spurs dominated Game 5 with a 109–84 win to close out the series against the Jazz and advance to the 2007 NBA Finals. The matchup for the Spurs was the Cleveland Cavaliers, led by young talent LeBron James. James would lead the postseason in total points scored and assists, but the Spurs would come away with a tight sweep. The Spurs won Game 1 and 2 by nine and eleven points heading into Cleveland, which saw margins narrow to three and one point, with the Spurs on top each time. Tony Parker averaged 24.5 points per game (most on either side) to be named Finals MVP. It was their fourth overall title in eight years and third title in five years.

=== 2007–08 season ===
During the 2007–08 NBA season, the group led the Spurs to a 56–26 record which resulted in them getting the number three seed and a first-round matchup with the Phoenix Suns. In Game 1, Duncan scored 40 points and made the game-tying three-pointer in overtime to force double-overtime and Ginóbili had the game-winning drive-to-the-basket with 1.5 seconds left in the second overtime period to win Game 1 117–115 in double overtime. In the Western Conference Finals, the Los Angeles Lakers eliminated the Spurs from the playoffs.

=== 2008–09 season ===
Ginóbili missed more than half of the 2008–09 NBA season due to injury, and the Spurs finished 54–28 and ended up as the number three seed in the Western Conference. The toll from Ginóbili's injury hit them in the playoffs as, despite a 38-point performance in Game 2 and a 43-point performance in Game 4 from Parker, the Spurs lost to the Mavericks in a five-game series in the first round, and failed to make it past the first round for the first time since 2000.

=== 2009–10 season ===
The trio managed to lead the Spurs to another 50-win season in 2010, but they ended up as the number seven seed in the Western Conference. The Spurs upset number two-seeded Dallas Mavericks, thanks in part to 25-point performances by Duncan in Games 2 and 3 and a 26-point performance by Ginóbili in Game 6 to close out the series. The Spurs' season ended in the conference semifinals with a loss to the Phoenix Suns.

=== 2010–11 season: Losing to the 8th Seeded Grizzlies ===
During the 2010–11 NBA season, the Spurs had a 61–21 record and earned the number one seed in the Western Conference. Ginóbili, who was clearly the best Spurs player in these seasons being named 8th in the MVP awards, was injured in the final game of the regular season. He played through his injury in the playoffs. His injury combined with a playoff performance by Duncan that was not up to par with previous years resulted in the Spurs losing to the Memphis Grizzlies in the first round of the playoffs.

=== 2011–12 season ===
During the lockout-shortened 2011–12 season, the Spurs finished with a 50–16 record and again earned the number one seed in the Western Conference. Duncan averaged 15.4 points, Tony Parker averaged 18.3 and Ginóbili averaged 12.9 points. The Spurs completed two four-game sweeps against the Utah Jazz and the Los Angeles Clippers to reach the Western Conference Finals. In the Western Conference Finals against the Oklahoma City Thunder, the Spurs were eliminated in six games.

=== 2012–13 season: Heartbreak in the Finals ===
The following season, the Spurs finished with a 58–24 record and earned the number two seed in the NBA Playoffs as a result. The trio led the Spurs to a four-game sweep over the Los Angeles Lakers and ended up facing the Golden State Warriors with Stephen Curry in the second round. In Game 1, after missing many critical shots, Ginóbili shot the game-winning three-pointer to give the Spurs a 129–127 win in double overtime and put them in front 1–0. The Warriors took Game 2 to even the series at 1–1 and then, Tony Parker had a 32-point performance in Game 3 to take a 2–1 series lead. The Spurs defeated the Warriors in six games to advance to the Conference Finals. The Spurs swept the Memphis Grizzlies in the conference finals to advance to the 2013 NBA Finals where they faced the Miami Heat. In Game 1 of the NBA Finals, Tony Parker hit a layup with 5.2 seconds left to put the Spurs ahead 92–88. The Spurs won the game and took a 1–0 series lead, and alternated series wins with the Heat until Game 6.

Game 6 was a thriller, as the San Antonio Spurs were ready for their championship celebration with 28 seconds left and leading 94–89, but Ray Allen's game-tying 3-pointer with 5.2 seconds left cancelled it and forced overtime. The Spurs ended up losing in overtime and game seven to the Miami Heat.

=== 2013–14 season: Revenge on Miami and 5th Championship ===
During the 2013–14 NBA season, the Spurs finished with an NBA-best 62–20 record, thus earning home-court advantage throughout the entire playoffs. The Dallas Mavericks forced a Game 7 on them in the first round, but Parker put up a 32-point performance to help defeat them 119–96 to advance to the second round. Parker kept up the strong performances going into the second round with a 33-point performance in Game 1 to give the Spurs a 116–92 win over the Portland Trail Blazers and take a 1–0 series lead. The Spurs beat the Trail Blazers in a five-game series. The Spurs then beat the Oklahoma City Thunder in a six-game series to reach the 2014 NBA Finals, giving the Spurs consecutive trips to the NBA Finals for the first time in franchise history. They faced the Miami Heat for the second consecutive year. The trio shot a combined 62 points in Game 1—21 from Duncan, 19 from Parker, and 16 from Ginóbili—along with 10 rebounds from Duncan and 11 assists from Ginóbili and eight from Parker. This helped the Spurs win Game 1 110–95 in a 90 °F (32 °C) AT&T Center to take a 1–0 series lead. The Spurs ended up winning the Finals in five games, winning their final game 104–87, to win their fifth championship in franchise history, and the fourth and final championship during the "Big Three" era. Duncan led the league in playoff rebounds with 211 while averaging ten in the Finals, while Parker averaged eighteen points a game in the series and Ginóbili averaged 14.4. However, none of the trio would win the NBA Finals MVP award in 2014, as third-year player Kawhi Leonard averaged 17.8 points on his way to winning the MVP Award.

=== 2014–15 season ===
During the 2014–15 NBA season, the Spurs finished with a 55–27 record and earned the number six seed in the Western Conference. While it was the sixteenth straight season that the team won fifty games, it was the first time since the 1996–97 season that the Spurs did not finish first or second in their division, as they finished third. In their first-round playoff series against the Los Angeles Clippers, Tim Duncan had 20-plus performances in Games 2, 5, and 7 but the Spurs lost the series to the Clippers in seven games.

=== 2015–16 season ===
During the 2015–16 NBA season, which ended up being their last season together, the main trio and the Spurs finished with a franchise-best 67–15 record and earned the number two seed in the Western Conference. The Spurs swept the Memphis Grizzlies in the first round but lost a six-game series to the Oklahoma City Thunder in the conference semifinals.

On July 11, 2016, Tim Duncan announced that he was retiring from the NBA after a nineteen-year career, thus ending the "Big Three" era.

== Post-"Big Three" ==
In the 2016–17 season, the Spurs reached the Western Conference Finals, losing to Golden State in a four-game sweep after leading scorer Kawhi Leonard was injured in Game 1. The Warriors went on to win the 2017 NBA championship. During the 2018 playoffs, the Spurs were defeated by the Warriors, 4–1, in the first round of the playoffs. The remaining members of the group, Ginóbili and Parker, played in the series; Ginóbili averaged 9.0 points per game and Parker averaging 6.0 points per game. After the 2017–18 NBA season, Parker signed with the Charlotte Hornets and Ginóbili retired. Parker played one season with the Hornets, then retired after the 2018–19 NBA season.
