= 1994–95 North Carolina Tar Heels men's basketball team =

American college basketball season

1994–95 North Carolina Tar Heels men's basketball

ACC regular season co-champion

NCAA tournament, Final Four
- Conference: Atlantic Coast Conference

Ranking
- Coaches: No. 3
- AP: No. 4
- Record: 28–6 (12–4 ACC)
- Head coach: Dean Smith (34th season)
- Assistant coaches: Bill Guthridge (28th season); Phil Ford (7th season); Dave Hanners (6th season)
- Home arena: Dean Smith Center

1994–95 ACC men's basketball standings
	Conf.				Overall
Team	W		L	PCT	W		L	PCT
No. 3 Wake Forest †	12	–	4	.750	26	–	6	.813
No. 4 North Carolina	12	–	4	.750	28	–	6	.824
No. 10 Maryland	12	–	4	.750	26	–	8	.765
No. 13 Virginia	12	–	4	.750	25	–	9	.735
Georgia Tech	8	–	8	.500	18	–	12	.600
Florida State	5	–	11	.313	12	–	15	.444
Clemson	5	–	11	.313	15	–	13	.536
NC State	4	–	12	.250	12	–	15	.444
Duke	2	–	14	.125	13	–	18	.419
† 1995 ACC tournament winner Rankings from AP poll

The 1994–95 North Carolina Tar Heels men's basketball team represented University of North Carolina at Chapel Hill. The head coach was Dean Smith. The team played its home games in Chapel Hill, North Carolina and was a member of the Atlantic Coast Conference. In the NCAA Tournament the Tar Heels advanced to the Final Four before being defeated by defending National Champion Arkansas Razorbacks 75–68.

== Roster ==
1994–95 North Carolina Tar Heels men's basketball team
Players
Coaches

Pos.	#	Name	Height	Weight	Year	Previous school	Hometown
F	3	Pat Sullivan	6 ft 8 in (2.03 m)	210 lb (95 kg)	RS Sr	Bogota	Bogota, NJ
G	4	David Neal	5 ft 11 in (1.8 m)	175 lb (79 kg)	Jr	Sanderson	Raleigh, NC
G	15	Shammond Williams	6 ft 3 in (1.91 m)	189 lb (86 kg)	Fr	Fork Union Military	Greenville, South Carolina
F	4	Makhtar N'Diaye	6 ft 10 in (2.08 m)	231 lb (105 kg)	Fr	Oak Hill Academy	Dakar, Senegal
G	5	Jeff McInnis	6 ft 4 in (1.93 m)	179 lb (81 kg)	So	Oak Hill Academy	Charlotte, North Carolina
G	21	Donald Williams	6 ft 3 in (1.91 m)	194 lb (88 kg)	Sr	Garner Magnet	Garner, NC
G	22	Pearce Landry	6 ft 5 in (1.96 m)	180 lb (82 kg)	Sr	Page	Greensboro, NC
G	24	Dante Calabria	6 ft 4 in (1.93 m)	185 lb (84 kg)	Jr	Blackhawk	Beaver Falls, PA
F	30	Rasheed Wallace	6 ft 10 in (2.08 m)	225 lb (102 kg)	So	Simon Gratz	Philadelphia, PA
F	34	Charlie McNairy	6 ft 7 in (2.01 m)	201 lb (91 kg)	So	Kinston	Kinston, NC
F	40	Ed Geth	6 ft 8 in (2.03 m)	230 lb (104 kg)	So	Granby	Norfolk, VA
F	42	Jerry Stackhouse	6 ft 6 in (1.98 m)	215 lb (98 kg)	So	Oak Hill Academy	Kinston, NC
G	44	Clyde Lynn	6 ft 2 in (1.88 m)	204 lb (93 kg)	Jr	Page	Greensboro, NC
C	45	Serge Zwikker	7 ft 2 in (2.18 m)	273 lb (124 kg)	So	Harker Prep	Potomac, MD
G	50	Octavus Barnes	6 ft 2 in (1.88 m)	182 lb (83 kg)	So	Hunt	Wilson, NC

Head coach

- Dean Smith (Kansas)

Assistant coach(es)

- Bill Guthridge (Kansas State)

Legend

- (C) Team captain
- (S) Suspended
- (I) Ineligible
- (W) Walk-on
- Injured
- Current redshirt

Roster
Last update: March 24, 2020

== NCAA basketball tournament ==
- Southeast
  - North Carolina 80, Murray State 70
  - North Carolina 73, Iowa State 51
  - North Carolina 74, Georgetown 64
  - North Carolina 74, Kentucky 61
- Final Four
  - Arkansas 75, North Carolina 68

== Awards and honors ==
- Jerry Stackhouse, First Team, 1995 NCAA Men's Basketball All-Americans
- Rasheed Wallace, Second Team, 1995 NCAA Men's Basketball All-Americans

== Team players drafted into the NBA ==
Year	Round	Pick	Player	NBA club
1995	1	3	Jerry Stackhouse	Philadelphia 76ers
1995	1	4	Rasheed Wallace	Washington Bullets
1996	2	37	Jeff McInnis	Denver Nuggets
1997	2	29	Serge Zwikker	Houston Rockets
1998	2	34	Shammond Williams	Chicago Bulls
