= 1994–95 Wake Forest Demon Deacons men's basketball team =

American college basketball season

1994–95 Wake Forest Demon Deacons men's basketball

ACC tournament champion ACC regular season champion

NCAA tournament, Sweet Sixteen
- Conference: Atlantic Coast Conference

Ranking
- Coaches: No. 9
- AP: No. 3
- Record: 26–6 (12–4 ACC)
- Head coach: Dave Odom
- Assistant coaches: Ricky Stokes; Russell Turner
- MVP: Travis Banks
- Captains: Travis Banks; Randolph Childress
- Home arena: LJVM Coliseum

1994–95 ACC men's basketball standings
| | Conf. | | | | Overall |
| Team | W | | L | PCT | W | | L | PCT |
|---|---|---|---|---|---|---|---|---|
| No. 3 Wake Forest † | 12 | – | 4 | .750 | 26 | – | 6 | .813 |
| No. 4 North Carolina | 12 | – | 4 | .750 | 28 | – | 6 | .824 |
| No. 10 Maryland | 12 | – | 4 | .750 | 26 | – | 8 | .765 |
| No. 13 Virginia | 12 | – | 4 | .750 | 25 | – | 9 | .735 |
| Georgia Tech | 8 | – | 8 | .500 | 18 | – | 12 | .600 |
| Florida State | 5 | – | 11 | .313 | 12 | – | 15 | .444 |
| Clemson | 5 | – | 11 | .313 | 15 | – | 13 | .536 |
| NC State | 4 | – | 12 | .250 | 12 | – | 15 | .444 |
| Duke | 2 | – | 14 | .125 | 13 | – | 18 | .419 |
† 1995 ACC tournament winner Rankings from AP poll

The 1994–95 Wake Forest Demon Deacons men's basketball team represented Wake Forest University as a member of the Atlantic Coast Conference during the 1994–95 men's college basketball season. Led by head coach Dave Odom, the Demon Deacons played their home games at LJVM Coliseum in Winston-Salem, North Carolina.

After entering the season with a No. 24 preseason ranking in both major polls, Wake Forest finished in a four-way tie for the ACC regular season title with a 12–4 conference record. The team defeated Duke, Virginia, and North Carolina (in OT) to win the ACC tournament and receive the No. 1 seed in the East region of the NCAA tournament. After defeating No. 16 seed North Carolina A&T and No. 9 seed Saint Louis to reach the Sweet Sixteen, Wake Forest was knocked off by No. 4 seed and eventual Final Four participant Oklahoma State, 71–66, to finish the season with a 26–6 record. The Demon Deacons were No. 3 in the final AP poll and No. 9 in the final Coaches poll.

Senior guard Randolph Childress was named a consensus second-team All-American and ACC Athlete of the Year. Coach Odom was named ACC Coach of the Year for the second season in a row and third time overall.

== Previous season ==
Wake Forest finished third in the ACC regular season standings and reached the second round of the NCAA tournament. Head coach Dave Odom was named ACC Coach of the Year for the second time.

== Roster ==
1994–95 Wake Forest Demon Deacons men's basketball team
Players
Coaches

| Pos. | # | Name | Height | Weight | Year | Previous school | Hometown |
|---|---|---|---|---|---|---|---|
| G | 3 | Barry Canty | 6 ft 5 in (1.96 m) | 170 lb (77 kg) | Jr | Independence | Charlotte, NC |
| G | 4 | Matt Burns | 6 ft 2 in (1.88 m) | 165 lb (75 kg) | Fr | — | Pully, Switzerland |
| G | 5 | Steve Goolsby | 6 ft 4 in (1.93 m) | 194 lb (88 kg) | Fr | Marietta HS | Marietta, GA |
| G | 10 | Rusty LaRue | 6 ft 2 in (1.88 m) | 185 lb (84 kg) | Jr | Northwest Guilford | Oak Ridge, NC |
| G | 20 | Marc Scott | 6 ft 2 in (1.88 m) | 185 lb (84 kg) | So | — | Chapel Hill, NC |
| F/C | 21 | Tim Duncan | 6 ft 11 in (2.11 m) | 240 lb (109 kg) | So | St. Dunstan's Episcopal | Saint Croix, U.S. Virgin Islands |
| G | 22 | Randolph Childress (C) | 6 ft 2 in (1.88 m) | 175 lb (79 kg) | Sr | Flint Hill School | Clinton, MD |
| F | 23 | Antonio Jackson | 6 ft 8 in (2.03 m) | 200 lb (91 kg) | Fr | Aliceville HS | Aliceville, AL |
| G | 25 | Jerry Braswell | 6 ft 1 in (1.85 m) | 180 lb (82 kg) | Fr | Randolph-Clay | Cuthbert, GA |
| G | 30 | Tony Rutland | 6 ft 2 in (1.88 m) | 183 lb (83 kg) | Fr | Bethel | Hampton, VA |
| G | 31 | Matt Simpson | 6 ft 3 in (1.91 m) | 205 lb (93 kg) | So | Franklin Road Academy | Nashville, TN |
| F | 34 | Travis Banks | 6 ft 6 in (1.98 m) | 232 lb (105 kg) | Sr | Clinton HS | Clinton, NC |
| C | 40 | Sean Allen | 6 ft 8 in (2.03 m) | 230 lb (104 kg) | So | — | Raleigh, NC |
| F | 44 | Ricky Peral | 6 ft 10 in (2.08 m) | 230 lb (104 kg) | So | — | Valladolid, Spain |
| F | 53 | Ken Herbst | 6 ft 6 in (1.98 m) | — | So | — | Winston-Salem, NC |

Head coach

- Dave Odom

Assistant coach(es)

- Ricky Stokes

Legend

- (C) Team captain
- (S) Suspended
- (I) Ineligible
- (W) Walk-on
- Injured
- Current redshirt

Roster
Last update: March 24, 2020

== Schedule ==
| Date time, TV | Rank^{#} | Opponent^{#} | Result | Record | Site city, state |
Regular season
| November 26* | No. 24 | UNC Greensboro | W 75–55 | 1–0 | LJVM Coliseum; Winston-Salem, NC |
| November 29* | No. 21 | at Davidson | W 74–62 | 2–0 | Belk Arena; Davidson, NC |
| December 3* | No. 21 | No. 6 Florida | L 70–81 | 2–1 | Greensboro Coliseum; Greensboro, NC |
| December 5* | No. 25 | at Canisius | W 74–60 | 3–1 | Koessler Athletic Center; Buffalo, NY |
| December 8* | No. 25 | at Richmond | W 53–49 | 4–1 | Robins Center; Richmond, VA |
| December 17* | No. 21 | Charleston | W 74–64 | 5–1 | LJVM Coliseum; Winston-Salem, NC |
| December 20* | No. 19 | The Citadel | W 81–58 | 6–1 | LVJM Coliseum; Winston-Salem, NC |
| December 30* | No. 18 | Marshall | W 95–59 | 7–1 | LVJM Coliseum; Winston-Salem, NC |
| January 7 | No. 18 | Florida State | W 72–64 | 8–1 (1-0) | LJVM Coliseum; Winston-Salem, NC |
| January 11 | No. 14 | No. 11 Duke | W 74–64 | 9–1 (2-0) | LJVM Coliseum; Winston-Salem, NC |
| January 14 | No. 14 | at No. 9 Maryland | L 66–76 | 9–2 (2-1) | Cole Field House; College Park, MD |
| January 17 | No. 15 | at No. 22 Georgia Tech | L 65–67 | 9—3 (2-2) | Alexander Memorial Coliseum; Atlanta, GA |
| January 21 | No. 15 | Clemson | W 69–60 | 10–3 (3-2) | LJVM Coliseum; Winston-Salem, NC |
| January 25 | No. 16 | at No. 15 Virginia | W 71–70 | 11–3 (4-2) | University Hall; Charlottesville, VA |
| January 28 | No. 16 | No. 3 North Carolina | L 61–62 | 11–4 (4-3) | LJVM Coliseum; Winston-Salem, NC |
| January 29* | No. 16 | Vanderbilt | W 63–51 | 12–4 | LJVM Coliseum; Winston-Salem, NC |
| February 1 | No. 14 | at NC State | W 69–61 | 13-4 (5-3) | Reynolds Coliseum; Raleigh, NC |
| February 4* | No. 14 | at Winthrop | W 68–54 | 14-4 | Winthrop Coliseum; Rock Hill, SC |
| February 8 | No. 11 | at Florida State | L 67–69 | 14-5 (5-4) | Donald L. Tucker Center; Tallahassee, FL |
| February 11 | No. 11 | at Duke | W 62–61 | 15-5 (6-4) | Cameron Indoor Stadium; Durham, NC |
| February 15 | No. 14 | No. 7 Maryland | W 63–54 | 16-5 (7-4) | LJVM Coliseum; Winston-Salem, NC |
| February 18 | No. 14 | No. 20 Georgia Tech | W 73–62 | 17-5 (8-4) | LJVM Coliseum; Winston-Salem, NC |
| February 22 | No. 10 | at Clemson | W 64–52 | 18-5 (9-4) | Littlejohn Coliseum; Clemson, SC |
| February 26 | No. 10 | No. 11 Virginia | W 66–63 | 19-5 (10-4) | LJVM Coliseum; Winston-Salem, NC |
| February 28 | No. 9 | at No. 2 North Carolina | W 79–70 | 20-5 (11-4) | Dean Smith Center; Chapel Hill, NC |
| March 4 | No. 9 | NC State | W 83–68 | 21-5 (12-4) | LJVM Coliseum; Winston-Salem, NC |
ACC Tournament
| March 10*; JP | No. 7 | vs. Duke; ACC tournament Quarterfinal | W 87–70 | 22-5 | Greensboro Coliseum; Greensboro, NC |
| March 11* | No. 7 | vs. No. 11 Virginia; ACC Tournament semifinals | W 77–68 | 23-5 | Greensboro Coliseum; Greensboro, NC |
| March 12* | No. 7 | vs. No. 4 North Carolina; ACC tournament championship | W 82–80 ^{OT} | 24-5 | Greensboro Coliseum; Greensboro, NC |
NCAA Tournament
| March 16* | (1 E) No. 3 | vs. (16 E) North Carolina A&T; NCAA tournament first round | W 79–47 | 25-5 | Baltimore Arena; Baltimore, MD |
| March 18* | (1 E) No. 3 | vs. Saint Louis; NCAA tournament second round | W 64–59 | 26-5 | Baltimore Arena; Baltimore, MD |
| March 24* | No. 3 | vs. No. 14 Oklahoma State; NCAA Tournament Regional semifinal | L 66–71 | 26-6 | Brendan Byrne Arena; East Rutherford, NJ |
*Non-conference game. ^{#}Rankings from AP Poll. (#) Tournament seedings in parentheses.

== Awards and honors ==
- Randolph Childress – consensus second-team All-American, ACC Athlete of the Year
- Dave Odom – ACC Coach of the Year
