= 1995 NCAA Men's Basketball All-Americans =

- Awarded for: 1994–95 NCAA Division I men's basketball season

The Consensus 1995 College Basketball All-American team, as determined by aggregating the results of four major All-American teams. To earn "consensus" status, a player must win honors from a majority of the following teams: the Associated Press, the USBWA, The United Press International and the National Association of Basketball Coaches.

== 1995 Consensus All-America team ==
Consensus First Team
Player	Position	Class	Team
Ed O'Bannon	F	Senior	UCLA
Shawn Respert	G	Senior	Michigan State
Joe Smith	F/C	Sophomore	Maryland
Jerry Stackhouse	F/G	Sophomore	North Carolina
Damon Stoudamire	G	Senior	Arizona

Consensus Second Team
Player	Position	Class	Team
Randolph Childress	G	Senior	Wake Forest
Kerry Kittles	G	Junior	Villanova
Lou Roe	F	Senior	Massachusetts
Rasheed Wallace	C	Sophomore	North Carolina
Corliss Williamson	F	Junior	Arkansas

== Individual All-America teams ==
All-America Team
All-America Team	First team		Second team		Third team	
All-America Team	Player	School	Player	School	Player	School
Associated Press	Ed O'Bannon	UCLA	Randolph Childress	Wake Forest	Ray Allen	Connecticut
Associated Press	Shawn Respert	Michigan State	Kerry Kittles	Villanova	Tim Duncan	Wake Forest
Associated Press	Joe Smith	Maryland	Lou Roe	Massachusetts	Lawrence Moten	Syracuse
Associated Press	Jerry Stackhouse	North Carolina	Rasheed Wallace	North Carolina	Bryant Reeves	Oklahoma State
Associated Press	Damon Stoudamire	Arizona	Corliss Williamson	Arkansas	Kurt Thomas	Texas Christian
USBWA	Ed O'Bannon	UCLA	Randolph Childress	Wake Forest	No third team	
USBWA	Shawn Respert	Michigan State	Kerry Kittles	Villanova	No third team	
USBWA	Joe Smith	Maryland	Lou Roe	Massachusetts	No third team	
USBWA	Jerry Stackhouse	North Carolina	Rasheed Wallace	North Carolina	No third team	
USBWA	Damon Stoudamire	Arizona	Corliss Williamson	Arkansas	No third team	
NABC	Ed O'Bannon	UCLA	Randolph Childress	Wake Forest	Ray Allen	Connecticut
NABC	Shawn Respert	Michigan State	Kerry Kittles	Villanova	Alan Henderson	Indiana
NABC	Joe Smith	Maryland	Lou Roe	Massachusetts	Lawrence Moten	Syracuse
NABC	Jerry Stackhouse	North Carolina	Rasheed Wallace	North Carolina	Bryant Reeves	Oklahoma State
NABC	Damon Stoudamire	Arizona	Corliss Williamson	Arkansas	Kurt Thomas	Texas Christian
UPI	Ed O'Bannon	UCLA	Kerry Kittles	Villanova	Ray Allen	Connecticut
UPI	Shawn Respert	Michigan State	Bryant Reeves	Oklahoma State	Randolph Childress	Wake Forest
UPI	Joe Smith	Maryland	Lou Roe	Massachusetts	Ryan Minor	Oklahoma
UPI	Jerry Stackhouse	North Carolina	Rasheed Wallace	North Carolina	Kurt Thomas	Texas Christian
UPI	Damon Stoudamire	Arizona	Corliss Williamson	Arkansas	Jacque Vaughn	Kansas

AP Honorable Mention

- Mario Bennett, Arizona State
- Travis Best, Georgia Tech
- Junior Burrough, Virginia
- Marcus Camby, Massachusetts
- Dan Cross, Florida
- Erick Dampier, Mississippi State
- Tony Delk, Kentucky
- Tyus Edney, UCLA
- Michael Finley, Wisconsin
- Alan Henderson, Indiana
- Fred Hoiberg, Iowa State
- Allen Iverson, Georgetown
- Tom Kleinschmidt, DePaul
- Donny Marshall, Connecticut
- Cuonzo Martin, Purdue
- Ryan Minor, Oklahoma
- Steve Nash, Santa Clara
- Greg Ostertag, Kansas
- Cherokee Parks, Duke
- Terrence Rencher, Texas
- Bob Sura, Florida State
- Scotty Thurman, Arkansas
- Gary Trent, Ohio
- Keith Van Horn, Utah
- Jacque Vaughn, Kansas
