= 1994–95 Duke Blue Devils men's basketball team =

American college basketball season

1994–95 Duke Blue Devils men's basketball
- Conference: Atlantic Coast Conference
- Record: 13–18 (2–14 ACC)
- Head coach: Mike Krzyzewski (9–3) (15th season); Pete Gaudet (interim) (4–15)
- Home arena: Cameron Indoor Stadium

1994–95 ACC men's basketball standings
	Conf.				Overall
Team	W		L	PCT	W		L	PCT
No. 3 Wake Forest †	12	–	4	.750	26	–	6	.813
No. 4 North Carolina	12	–	4	.750	28	–	6	.824
No. 10 Maryland	12	–	4	.750	26	–	8	.765
No. 13 Virginia	12	–	4	.750	25	–	9	.735
Georgia Tech	8	–	8	.500	18	–	12	.600
Florida State	5	–	11	.313	12	–	15	.444
Clemson	5	–	11	.313	15	–	13	.536
NC State	4	–	12	.250	12	–	15	.444
Duke	2	–	14	.125	13	–	18	.419
† 1995 ACC tournament winner Rankings from AP poll

The 1994–95 Duke Blue Devils men's basketball team represented Duke University in the 1994–95 NCAA Division I men's basketball season. The season lives in Duke Blue Devil infamy, as head coach Mike Krzyzewski, was forced to leave the team after twelve games while seeking treatment for an injured back and exhaustion.

Assistant Pete Gaudet finished the rest of the Blue Devils' disappointing season with an overall record of 13–18, marking the first time since the 1982–83 season that they failed to finish above .500, won fewer than twenty games, and missed the NCAA tournament. The eighteen losses still stand as the most ever in a single season by a Duke team. This was also the last time Duke failed to make a national post-season tournament of any kind until 2021, when COVID-19 concerns caused them to drop out of the ACC tournament and end their season early.

== Roster ==
1994–95 Duke Blue Devils men's basketball team
Players
Coaches

Pos.	#	Name	Height	Weight	Year	Previous school	Hometown
G/F	3	Ricky Price	6 ft 6 in (1.98 m)	185 lb (84 kg)	Fr	Serra HS	Carson, CA
G	4	Kenny Blakeney (C)	6 ft 4 in (1.93 m)	190 lb (86 kg)	RS Sr	DeMatha Catholic HS	Washington, D.C.
G	5	Jeff Capel	6 ft 5 in (1.96 m)	195 lb (88 kg)	So	South View HS	Fayetteville, NC
G	12	Steve Wojciechowski	5 ft 11 in (1.8 m)	165 lb (75 kg)	Fr	Cardinal Gibbons School	Severna Park, MD
G	15	Todd Singleton (W)	6 ft 5 in (1.96 m)	185 lb (84 kg)	Fr	Old Mill HS	Queenstown, MD
G	20	Chris Collins	6 ft 3 in (1.91 m)	175 lb (79 kg)	Jr	Glenbrook North HS	Northbrook, IL
G	21	Trajan Langdon (W)	6 ft 4 in (1.93 m)	185 lb (84 kg)	Fr	East HS	Anchorage, AK
F	30	Tony Moore	6 ft 8 in (2.03 m)	220 lb (100 kg)	Jr	Newport Prep (MD)	Washington, D.C.
F	31	Stan Brunson (injured) (redshirt)	6 ft 6 in (1.98 m)	195 lb (88 kg)	Sr	Christiana HS	Newark, DE
F	34	Carmen Wallace	6 ft 6 in (1.98 m)	195 lb (88 kg)	So	Tower Hill School	Wilmington, DE
F	42	Joey Beard (TO)	6 ft 9 in (2.06 m)	225 lb (102 kg)	So	South Lakes HS	Reston, VA
C	44	Cherokee Parks (C)	6 ft 11 in (2.11 m)	240 lb (109 kg)	Sr	Marina HS	Huntington Beach, CA
C	52	Erik Meek (C)	6 ft 10 in (2.08 m)	245 lb (111 kg)	Sr	San Pasqual HS	Escondido, CA
F	55	Greg Newton	6 ft 11 in (2.11 m)	220 lb (100 kg)	So	A. N. Myer Secondary	Niagara Falls, Ontario

Head coach

- Mike Krzyzewski (Army)

Assistant coach(es)

- Pete Gaudet (Boston University)
- Mike Brey (George Washington)
- Tommy Amaker (Duke)

Strength and conditioning coach(es)

- Sonny Falcone (Duke)

Athletic trainer(s)

- David Engelhardt (Mankato State)

Legend

- (C) Team captain
- (S) Suspended
- (I) Ineligible
- (W) Walk-on
- (TO) Transferred out
- Injured
- Current redshirt

Roster
Last update: 2024-07-22

== Schedule ==
Date time, TV	Rank^{#}	Opponent^{#}	Result	Record	Site city, state
Regular season
November 25, 1994*	No. 8	Brown	W 80–38	1–0	Cameron Indoor Stadium; Durham, N.C.
November 26, 1994*	No. 8	Northeastern	W 93–70	2–0	Cameron Indoor Stadium; Durham, N.C.
November 29, 1994*	No. 6	vs. No. 16 Connecticut	L 86–90	2–1	Palace of Auburn Hills; Auburn Hills, Mich.
December 3, 1994*	No. 6	vs. Illinois	W 70–65	3–1	United Center; Chicago, Ill.
December 6, 1994*	No. 9	George Washington	W 103–73	4–1	Cameron Indoor Stadium; Durham, N.C.
December 10, 1994*	No. 9	No. 23 Michigan	W 69–59	5–1	Cameron Indoor Stadium; Durham, N.C.
December 19, 1994*	No. 9	North Carolina A&T	W 99–56	6–1	Cameron Indoor Stadium; Durham, N.C.
December 27, 1994*	No. 7	vs. Iowa; Rainbow Classic	L 71–81	6–2	Stan Sheriff Center; Honolulu, Hawaii
December 29, 1994*	No. 7	vs. Boston University; Rainbow Classic	W 73–54	7–2	Stan Sheriff Center; Honolulu, Hawaii
December 30, 1994	No. 7	vs. No. 17 Georgia Tech; Rainbow Classic	W 76–69	8–2	Stan Sheriff Center; Honolulu, Hawaii
January 2, 1995*	No. 7	South Carolina State	W 107–61	9–2	Cameron Indoor Stadium; Durham, N.C.
January 4, 1995	No. 11	Clemson	L 70–75	9–3	Cameron Indoor Stadium; Durham, N.C.
January 7, 1995	No. 11	at No. 24 Georgia Tech	L 68–75	9–4	
January 11, 1995	No. 16	at No. 14 Wake Forest	L 64–74	9–5	
January 14, 1995	No. 16	Virginia	L 88–91 ^{2OT}	9–6	Cameron Indoor Stadium; Durham, N.C.
January 18, 1995		NC State	L 60–77	9–7	Cameron Indoor Stadium; Durham, N.C.
January 21, 1995		at Florida State	L 75–78	9–8	
January 24, 1995*		at Notre Dame	W 87–74	10–8	
January 28, 1995		at No. 8 Maryland	L 72–74	10–9	
February 2, 1995		No. 2 North Carolina	L 100–102 ^{2OT}	10–10	Cameron Indoor Stadium; Durham, N.C.
February 4, 1995		at Clemson	L 44–51	10–11	
February 9, 1995		No. 18 Georgia Tech	W 77–70	11–11	Cameron Indoor Stadium; Durham, N.C.
February 11, 1995		No. 11 Wake Forest	L 61–62	11–12	Cameron Indoor Stadium; Durham, N.C.
February 15, 1995		at No. 16 Virginia	L 58–64	11–13	
February 18, 1995		at NC State	L 79–84	11–14	
February 22, 1995		Florida State	W 72–67	12–14	Cameron Indoor Stadium; Durham, N.C.
February 26, 1995		at No. 2 UCLA	L 77–100	12–15	
March 1, 1995		No. 6 Maryland	L 92–94	12–16	Cameron Indoor Stadium; Durham, N.C.
March 4, 1995		at No. 2 North Carolina	L 86–99	12–17	
ACC Tournament
March 9, 1995		vs. NC State	W 83–70	13–17	Greensboro Coliseum; Greensboro, N.C.
March 10, 1995		vs. No. 7 Wake Forest	L 70–87	13–18	Greensboro Coliseum; Greensboro, N.C.
*Non-conference game. ^{#}Rankings from AP Poll. (#) Tournament seedings in parentheses. Source: Duke media guide
