= Joe Smith (basketball) =

American basketball player (born 1975)

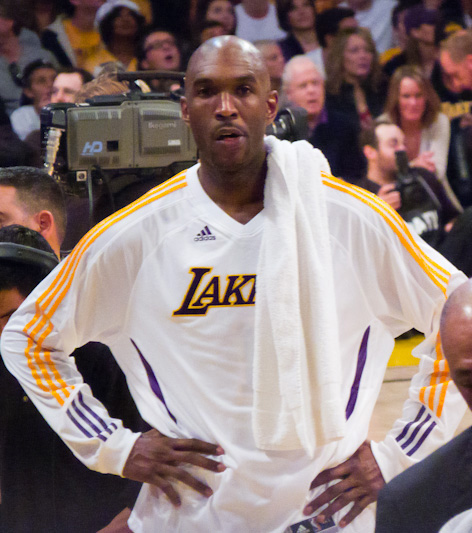
- Smith with the Los Angeles Lakers in 2010

Personal information
- Born: July 26, 1975 (age 51) Norfolk, Virginia, U.S.
- Listed height: 6 ft 10 in (2.08 m)
- Listed weight: 225 lb (102 kg)

Career information
- High school: Matthew Fontaine Maury (Norfolk, Virginia)
- College: Maryland (1993–1995)
- NBA draft: 1995: 1st round, 1st overall pick
- Drafted by: Golden State Warriors
- Playing career: 1995–2011
- Position: Power forward
- Number: 32, 9, 8, 7, 1

Career history
- 1995–1998: Golden State Warriors
- 1998: Philadelphia 76ers
- 1999–2000: Minnesota Timberwolves
- 2000–2001: Detroit Pistons
- 2001–2003: Minnesota Timberwolves
- 2003–2006: Milwaukee Bucks
- 2006: Denver Nuggets
- 2006–2007: Philadelphia 76ers
- 2007–2008: Chicago Bulls
- 2008: Cleveland Cavaliers
- 2008–2009: Oklahoma City Thunder
- 2009: Cleveland Cavaliers
- 2009–2010: Atlanta Hawks
- 2010: New Jersey Nets
- 2010–2011: Los Angeles Lakers

Career highlights
- NBA All-Rookie First Team (1996); Naismith College Player of the Year (1995); AP Player of the Year (1995); UPI College Player of the Year (1995); Adolph Rupp Trophy (1995); Consensus first-team All-American (1995); Third-team All-American – UPI (1994); ACC Player of the Year (1995); 2× First-team All-ACC (1994, 1995); ACC Rookie of the Year (1994); Third-team Parade All-American (1993)

Career NBA statistics
- Points: 11,208 (10.9 ppg)
- Rebounds: 6,575 (6.4 rpg)
- Blocks: 868 (0.8 bpg)
- Stats at NBA.com
- Stats at Basketball Reference

Joseph Leynard Smith (born July 26, 1975) is an American former professional basketball player. A power forward, he played for 12 teams in the National Basketball Association (NBA) during his 16-year career.

Born and raised in Norfolk, Virginia, Smith was the College Player of the Year at Maryland in 1995 and the No. 1 pick of that season's NBA draft, picked by the Golden State Warriors. He was named to the 1995–96 All-Rookie team. Smith was mobile throughout his career, as he was one of the most traded players in league history. In 1998, Smith was traded to the Philadelphia 76ers; he then played for the Minnesota Timberwolves (with a midway pitstop for the Detroit Pistons) until 2003. He later played for the Milwaukee Bucks, the Denver Nuggets, the 76ers again, the Chicago Bulls, the Oklahoma City Thunder, the Cleveland Cavaliers, the Atlanta Hawks, the New Jersey Nets, and the Los Angeles Lakers. Smith was on the active roster of 12 different teams, which was an NBA record shared with Jim Jackson, Tony Massenburg, Chucky Brown, and Ish Smith; until Ish played with the Denver Nuggets, his 13th team, in the 2022–23 season.

Smith attended Maury High School and played at the University of Maryland.

== Collegiate career ==
Smith played for Maryland for two seasons. As a sophomore, Smith averaged 20.8 points and 10.6 rebounds a game, and was named to the AP NCAA All-America Team. On March 2, 1995, Smith scored a collegiate career high 40 points and made a game winning tip in shot during a 94–92 victory over Duke.

== NBA career ==
=== Golden State Warriors (1995–1998) ===
In the 1995 NBA draft, Smith was selected by the Golden State Warriors as the first overall pick, before fellow power forwards Kevin Garnett, Antonio McDyess and Rasheed Wallace, as well as guard Jerry Stackhouse. On November 30, 1995, Smith scored his highest single game point total of his rookie season, with 30 points in a 125–121 loss to the Atlanta Hawks. On January 20, 1996, Smith grabbed a career high 20 rebounds, while also scoring 21 points, during a 110–102 loss to the Charlotte Hornets. At the end of the year, after starting all 82 games, Smith was named to the NBA All-Rookie First Team for the 1995–96 season and finished third in the Rookie of the Year voting to Damon Stoudamire and Arvydas Sabonis.

The following season, Smith would average a career best 18.7 points per game, second on the team only to Latrell Sprewell's 24.2 points per game. On January 8, 1997, Smith scored a career high 38 points in a 109–95 loss to the Vancouver Grizzlies. For the second season in a row, however, the Warriors would again miss the postseason, this time with a 30–52 record.

Smith would play 2 1/2 years for the Warriors before being traded to the Philadelphia 76ers with Brian Shaw for Clarence Weatherspoon and Jim Jackson midway through the 1997–98 season. The trade was engineered by Golden State as Smith had made clear his desire to return to the east coast, and he was approaching free agency (halfway through the final year of his 3-year rookie contract). Smith turned down a multi year $80+ million contract with the Warriors. He made a reported $61 million over his career.

=== Minnesota Timberwolves (1999–2000) ===
Despite a drop in production, Smith was still considered a hot commodity in free agency following the 1998 lockout. In an unexpected move, Smith signed for very little money with the Minnesota Timberwolves. For the next two years, Smith played well at small forward alongside All-Star Kevin Garnett.

==== Timberwolves salary cap scandal ====
Following the 1999–2000 season, it was discovered that Smith was involved in a salary cap-evading scandal involving Timberwolves owner Glen Taylor and general manager Kevin McHale. Smith was allegedly promised a future multimillion-dollar deal if he signed with the team for below market value, allowing the team to make some additional player moves in the short term. As part of the deal, Smith signed three one-year contracts for less than $3 million apiece, allowing the Timberwolves to retain his "Bird rights" and exceed the cap to re-sign him. At the end of the last one-year contract, Smith could have signed a new long-term contract that would have paid as much as $86 million.

The beginning of the end for the illicit deal came when Smith's agent, Andrew Miller, left the sports marketing firm helmed by Eric Fleisher and retained Smith and Garnett as clients. Fleisher sued, and details of the illegal contract came to light in discovery. NBA Commissioner David Stern severely punished the Timberwolves in response. He fined the team $3.5 million and voided all three short-term contracts—and with them, Smith's "Bird rights." He also barred Taylor from having any role in the Timberwolves' operations until August 31, 2001, and forced McHale to take an unpaid leave of absence through July 31, 2001. More seriously in the long run, Stern stripped the Timberwolves of their first-round draft picks in 2001, 2002, 2003, 2004 and 2005 (though the 2003 and 2005 picks were ultimately returned).

The team still found success, culminating in 2004 when the Timberwolves finished with the best record in the Western Conference, and advanced all the way to the Western Conference Finals.

=== Detroit Pistons (2000–2001) ===
Joe Smith was released by the Timberwolves and signed with the Detroit Pistons for the 2000–01 season as a backup. Smith produced good numbers for the Pistons and, at the end of the season, he re-signed with his former team the Timberwolves on a six-year, $34 million contract, where he played for two more seasons until the end of the 2002-03 NBA season.

=== Milwaukee Bucks (2003–2006) ===
In 2003, Smith and teammate Anthony Peeler were traded to the Milwaukee Bucks for Sam Cassell and Ervin Johnson. Smith spent three seasons with the Bucks. During the 2004 NBA Playoffs, Smith averaged postseason career highs of 13.2 points and 10 rebounds per game during a 4-1 first round loss to the Pistons.

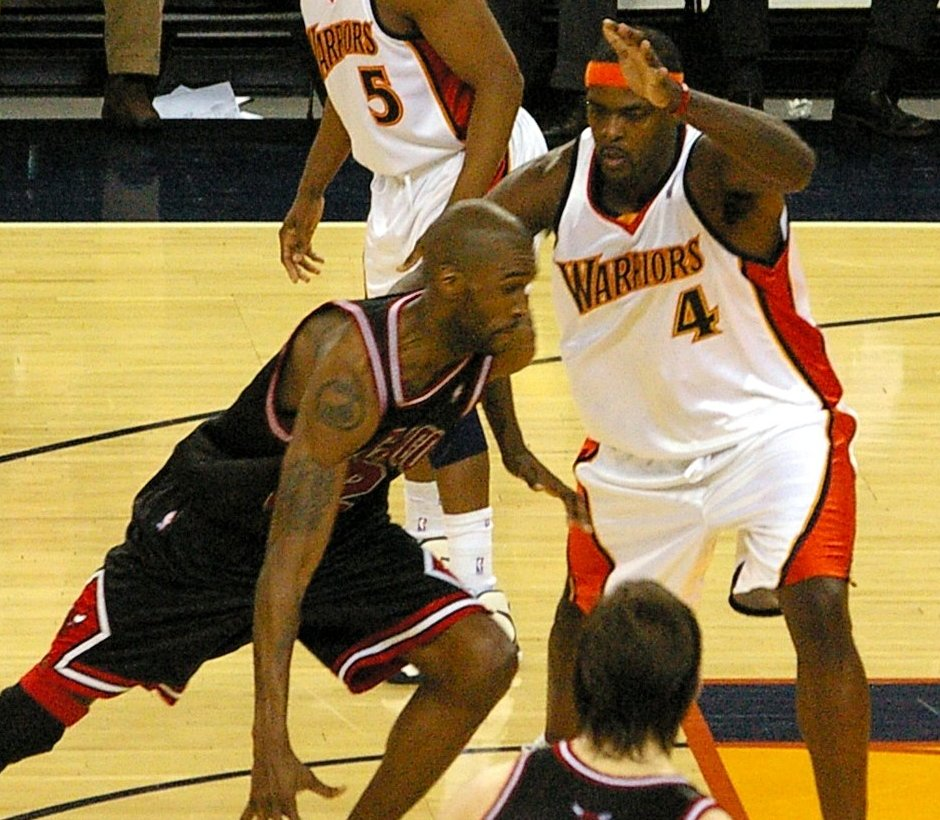
Smith (left) driving against the Warriors' Chris Webber (#4) with the Bulls in 2008

=== NBA journeyman (2007–2011) ===
Prior to the 2006–07 season, Smith was traded to the Nuggets for Ruben Patterson, where he only played in 11 games before being traded, along with Andre Miller, back to the 76ers for former teammate Allen Iverson. Despite being considered an add-in on the deal, Smith averaged over 25 minutes per game with the 76ers, during the team's ultimately unsuccessful battle in the second half of the regular season to make the playoffs. For the 2007–08 season, Smith signed with the Chicago Bulls. Smith averaged over 11 points and 5 rebounds per game for the Bulls, but the team managed only 33 wins the whole season. Smith was traded in a three-team deal at the trade deadline to the Cleveland Cavaliers.

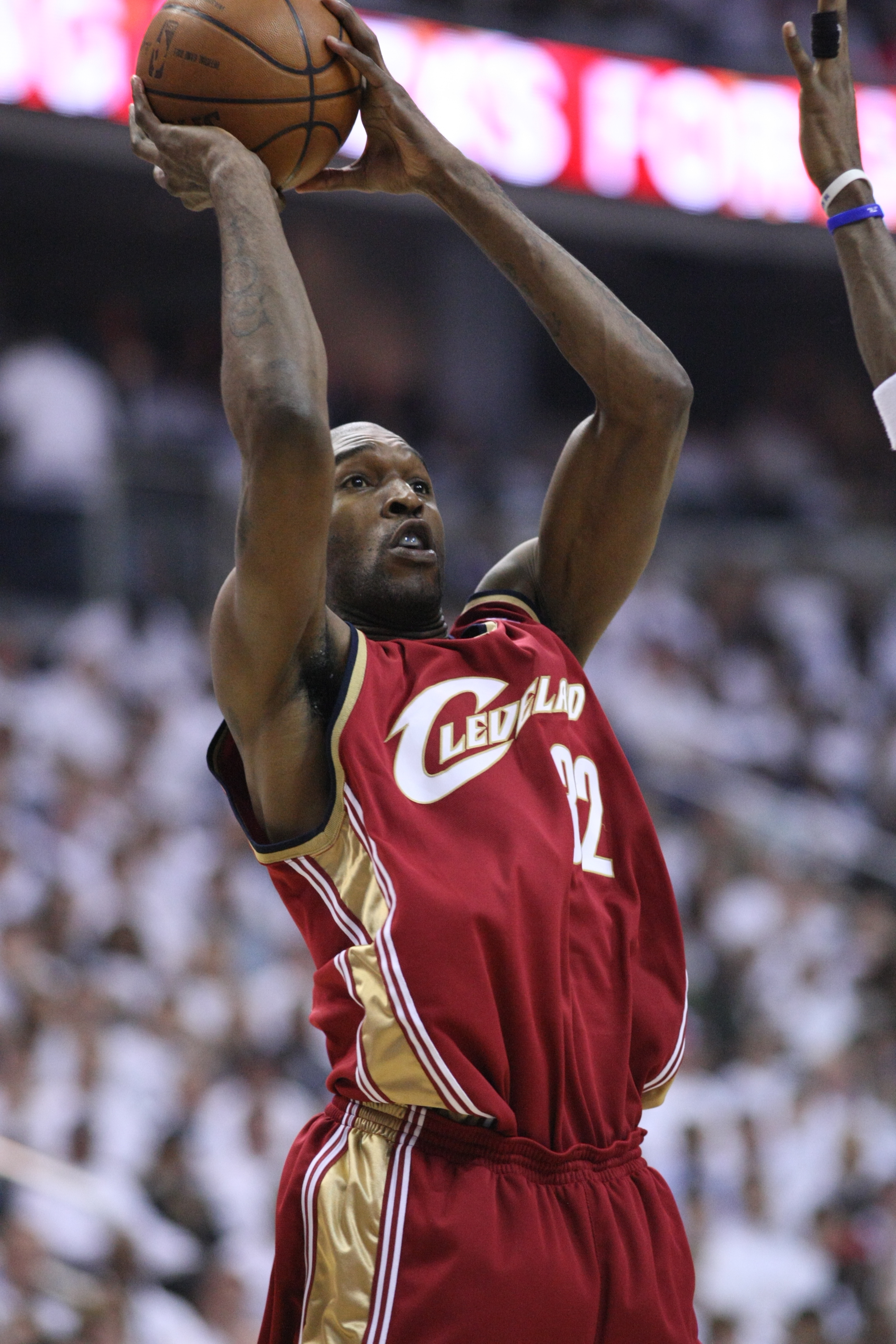
Smith as a Cleveland Cavalier

On August 13, 2008, Smith was traded to the Oklahoma City Thunder in a three-team, six-player deal involving the Thunder, the Milwaukee Bucks, and the Cleveland Cavaliers that sent Milwaukee's Mo Williams to Cleveland, Smith and Milwaukee's Desmond Mason to Oklahoma City, and Cleveland's Damon Jones and Oklahoma City's Luke Ridnour and Adrian Griffin to Milwaukee.

The Thunder traded Smith to the New Orleans Hornets along with Chris Wilcox and draft rights to DeVon Hardin on February 17, 2009, for Tyson Chandler but on February 18, 2009, the trade was rescinded after Chandler failed a physical with Oklahoma City.

On March 1, 2009, the Thunder bought out the remainder of Smith's contract and released him. Two nights later, he agreed to terms to rejoin the Cavaliers.

On August 25, 2009, he signed a one-year contract with the Atlanta Hawks. On March 17, 2010, Smith became the 92nd player in NBA history to reach 1,000 games played, in a victory over the New Jersey Nets.

On September 10, 2010, Smith signed a deal with the New Jersey Nets.

On December 15, 2010, Smith was traded to the Los Angeles Lakers in a three-team trade involving the Nets and Houston Rockets. On January 2, 2011, Smith made his debut for the Lakers. Two days later, he scored his first points as a member of the team.

== Coaching career ==
Smith wound up participating in one of the Phoenix Suns' pre-draft practices on June 9, 2015, as someone to help out center Alex Len during practice. He was initially considered a candidate to take on one of the Suns' player development coaching roles, but he was ultimately not hired for the position.

Smith continues to coach in the greater Atlanta area with the private coaching service, CoachUp.

== NBA career statistics ==
Legend
GP	Games played	GS	Games started	MPG	Minutes per game
FG%	Field goal percentage	3P%	3-point field goal percentage	FT%	Free throw percentage
RPG	Rebounds per game	APG	Assists per game	SPG	Steals per game
BPG	Blocks per game	PPG	Points per game	**Bold**	Career high
*	Led the league

=== Regular season ===
Year	Team	GP	GS	MPG	FG%	3P%	FT%	RPG	APG	SPG	BPG	PPG
1995–96	Golden State	**82**	**82***	34.4	.458	.357	.773	**8.7**	1.0	**1.0**	**1.6**	15.3
1996–97	Golden State	80	80	**38.6**	.454	.261	.814	8.5	**1.6**	.9	1.1	**18.7**
1997–98	Golden State	49	49	33.6	.429	.000	.769	6.9	1.4	.9	.8	17.3
1997–98	Philadelphia	30	6	23.3	.448	.000	.788	4.4	.9	.6	.4	10.3
1998–99	Minnesota	43	42	33.0	.427	.000	.755	8.2	**1.6**	.7	1.5	13.7
1999–00	Minnesota	78	9	25.3	.464	**1.000**	.756	6.2	1.1	.6	1.1	9.9
2000–01	Detroit	69	59	28.1	.403	.000	.805	7.1	1.1	.7	.7	12.3
2001–02	Minnesota	72	63	26.7	.511	.667	.830	6.3	1.1	.5	.8	10.7
2002–03	Minnesota	54	21	20.7	.460	.000	.779	5.0	.7	.3	1.0	7.5
2003–04	Milwaukee	76	76	29.7	.439	.200	.859	8.5	1.0	.6	1.2	10.9
2004–05	Milwaukee	74	73	30.6	**.514**	.000	.768	7.3	.9	.6	.5	11.0
2005–06	Milwaukee	44	5	20.2	.475	.000	.774	5.2	.7	.5	.3	8.6
2006–07	Denver	11	0	13.5	.479	.000	.833	3.6	.3	.6	.6	5.1
2006–07	Philadelphia	54	11	25.1	.445	.000	.846	6.7	.9	.6	.4	9.2
2007–08	Chicago	50	35	22.9	.466	.000	.807	5.3	.9	.5	.6	11.2
2007–08	Cleveland	27	1	21.5	.512	.000	.652	5.0	.7	.3	.6	8.1
2008–09	Oklahoma City	36	3	19.1	.454	.500	.704	4.6	.7	.3	.7	6.6
2008–09	Cleveland	21	0	19.5	.496	.333	.750	4.7	.8	.3	.7	6.5
2009–10	Atlanta	64	1	9.3	.399	.143	.813	2.5	.3	.1	.3	3.0
2010–11	New Jersey	4	3	6.1	.250	.000	.000	.8	.3	.0	.0	.5
2010–11	L.A. Lakers	12	0	3.7	.167	.000	**1.000**	1.5	.3	.0	.3	.5
Career		1,030	619	26.2	.455	.238	.790	6.4	1.0	.6	.8	10.9

=== Playoffs ===
Year	Team	GP	GS	MPG	FG%	3P%	FT%	RPG	APG	SPG	BPG	PPG
1999	Minnesota	4	4	30.0	.297	.000	.727	6.5	**1.3**	.5	**2.0**	7.5
2000	Minnesota	4	0	19.8	.471	.000	**1.000**	3.0	.3	**.8**	.3	4.5
2002	Minnesota	3	1	14.3	.429	.000	.875	3.7	.0	.0	.3	4.3
2003	Minnesota	5	1	8.0	**.667**	.000	**1.000**	1.2	.0	.2	.2	2.8
2004	Milwaukee	5	**5**	**35.0**	.491	.000	.923	**10.0**	.4	**.8**	**2.0**	**13.2**
2006	Milwaukee	5	0	21.2	.485	.000	.667	5.4	.6	.4	.4	7.6
2008	Cleveland	**13**	0	20.2	.486	.000	.636	4.6	.5	.4	.5	6.6
2009	Cleveland	**13**	0	16.8	.460	**.600**	.793	3.7	.2	.5	.5	5.5
2010	Atlanta	5	0	4.8	.000	.000	.000	.4	.0	.0	.2	.0
2011	L.A. Lakers	5	0	2.2	.000	.000	.000	.2	.0	.0	.0	.0
Career		62	11	17.4	.451	.375	.780	3.9	.3	.4	.6	5.4

== Music career ==
Smith has recorded a solo rap album under the pseudonym 'Joe Beast'. Included on the album are tracks titled "Murda Kapital" and "I Does This". The album was produced in Oklahoma City, by Tommy Switch and Lorin Roberts, while Smith was playing for the Oklahoma City Thunder.
