= Junior Burrough =

American basketball player (born 1973)

Personal information
- Born: January 18, 1973 (age 53) Charlotte, North Carolina
- Listed height: 6 ft 8 in (2.03 m)
- Listed weight: 242 lb (110 kg)

Career information
- High school: West Charlotte (Charlotte, North Carolina); Oak Hill Academy (Mouth of Wilson, Virginia)
- College: Virginia (1991–1995)
- NBA draft: 1995: 2nd round, 33rd overall pick
- Drafted by: Boston Celtics
- Playing career: 1995–2009
- Position: Power forward
- Number: 5

Career history
- 1995–1996: Boston Celtics
- 1996: Olimpia Basket Pistoia
- 1997–1998: Estudiantes de Olavarría
- 1998: Marinos B.B.C.
- 1998: Bayer 04 Leverkusen
- 1998–1999: Aishin Sea Horses
- 1999: Marinos B.B.C.
- 1999–2000: Aishin Sea Horses
- 2000: Richmond Rhythm
- 2000–2001: Aishin Sea Horses
- 2001: Trotamundos B.B.C.
- 2001–2002: Aishin Sea Horses
- 2002: Scaligera Basket Verona
- 2002–2003: JL Bourg Basket
- 2003: Gary Steelheads
- 2003: Atléticos de San Germán
- 2003: Iraklio B.C.
- 2004: Atléticos de San Germán
- 2004–2005: Anyang SBS
- 2005: Brujos de Guayama
- 2005: Maratonistas de Coamo
- 2005–2006: Seoul SK Knights
- 2006–2007: Anyang KT&G Kites
- 2007–2008: Great Falls Explorers
- 2008: Atléticos de San Germán
- 2008–2009: Pioneros de Quintana Roo
- 2009: Gaiteros del Zulia

Career highlights
- 2× Third-team All-ACC (1994, 1995)

Career statistics
- Points: 189
- Rebounds: 109
- Blocks: 10
- Stats at NBA.com
- Stats at Basketball Reference

Thomas Harold "Junior" Burrough (born January 18, 1973) is an American former professional basketball player.

== College playing career ==
He played four seasons with the University of Virginia, averaging 15.3 points and 7.2 rebounds per game. He was included in the third-team of the Atlantic Coast Conference in 1994 and 1995.

== Professional career ==
Burrough was selected by the Boston Celtics with the 33rd overall pick in the 1995 NBA draft. He played only one season for the Celtics in 1995–96, averaging 3.1 points and 1.8 rebounds per game in 61 games.

He moved to the Italian league and signed with Olimpia Basket Pistoia, where he averaged 15.4 points and 6.9 rebounds per game. On October 2, 1997, Burrough signed as a free agent with the Charlotte Hornets, but was waived on October 12.

From that moment on, he began a tour of different teams in America, Asia and Europe, and returned to Italy in 2002 to play with Scaligera Basket Verona in eight games, which he averaged 16.6 points and 7.8 rebounds per game. He later played for JL Bourg Basket in the French league, but only played four games, averaging 14.5 points and 5.3 rebounds per game.

In the summer, he played in the Puerto Rican league doing so for five seasons in four different teams, averaging a total of 18.4 points and 8.7 rebounds per game. He would finish his career with Gaiteros del Zulia in Venezuela.

== Coaching career ==
After his playing career ended, Burrough went on to become the boys basketball coach at Norfolk Collegiate School in Norfolk, Virginia.

== NBA career statistics ==
Legend
| GP | Games played | GS | Games started | MPG | Minutes per game |
| FG% | Field goal percentage | 3P% | 3-point field goal percentage | FT% | Free throw percentage |
| RPG | Rebounds per game | APG | Assists per game | SPG | Steals per game |
| BPG | Blocks per game | PPG | Points per game | **Bold** | Career high |

=== Regular season ===
| Year | Team | GP | GS | MPG | FG% | 3P% | FT% | RPG | APG | SPG | BPG | PPG |
|---|---|---|---|---|---|---|---|---|---|---|---|---|
| 1995–96 | Boston | 61 | 3 | 8.1 | .376 | .000 | .656 | 1.8 | .2 | .2 | .2 | 3.1 |
| Career | | 61 | 3 | 8.1 | .376 | .000 | .656 | 1.8 | .2 | .2 | .2 | 3.1 |
