= Randolph Childress =

US basketball player and coach

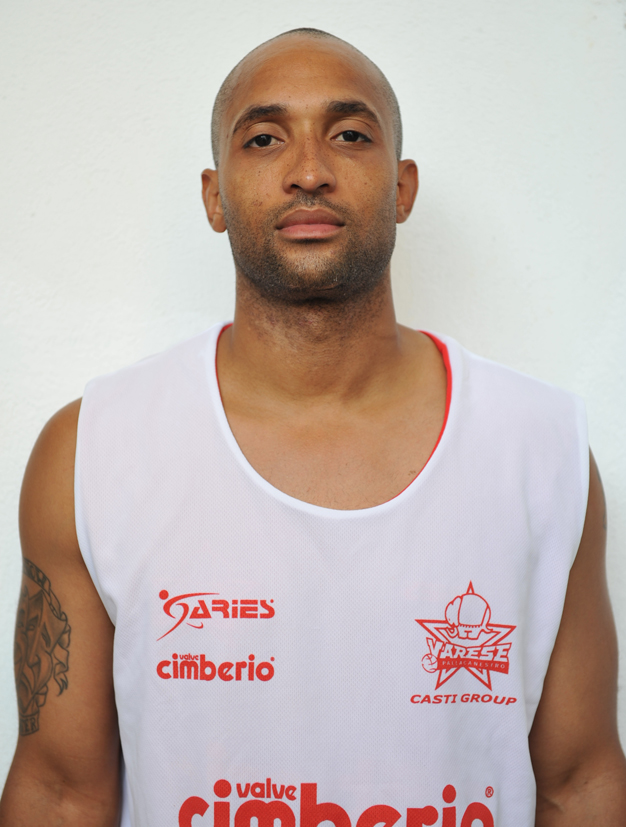

Personal information
- Born: September 21, 1972 (age 54) Washington, D.C., U.S.
- Listed height: 6 ft 2 in (1.88 m)
- Listed weight: 198 lb (90 kg)

Career information
- High school: Flint Hill (Oakton, Virginia)
- College: Wake Forest (1991–1995)
- NBA draft: 1995: 1st round, 19th overall pick
- Drafted by: Detroit Pistons
- Playing career: 1995–2011
- Position: Point guard
- Number: 12, 3

Career history

Playing
- 1995–1997: Portland Trail Blazers
- 1997: Detroit Pistons
- 1997–1998: Tofaş S.K.
- 1998–1999: Kombassan Konya
- 1999: Cholet
- 2000–2001: Record Napoli
- 2001: Sydney Kings
- 2001–2003: Rida Scafati
- 2003–2004: SLUC Nancy
- 2004–2007: Premiata Montegranaro
- 2007–2008: Pepsi Caserta
- 2008–2010: Cimberio Varese
- 2010: Dinamo Sassari
- 2010–2011: Mazzeo San Severo

Coaching
- 2013–2021: Wake Forest (assistant)

Career highlights
- Consensus second-team All-American (1995); ACC Athlete of the Year (1995); 2× First-team All-ACC (1994, 1995); Second-team All-ACC (1993); No. 22 retired by Wake Forest Demon Deacons
- Stats at NBA.com
- Stats at Basketball Reference

Randolph Childress (born September 21, 1972) is an American former professional basketball player. He is formerly an assistant coach for his alma mater, Wake Forest University.

== College career ==
Childress played collegiately at Wake Forest University, where he averaged 18.4 points per game for his four-year career. His collegiate highlight came in 1995, when he delivered one of the most outstanding ACC Tournament performances of all time. Named tournament MVP, Childress along with sophomore Tim Duncan, carried the Demon Deacons to the title, Childress averaged 35.7 points and 7 assists per game. In the finals, against a UNC team featuring Jerry Stackhouse and Rasheed Wallace, Childress scored 37 with 7 assists and hit a game-winning jumper with 4 seconds left in overtime. The game was highlighted by a crossover dribble Childress performed with UNC's Jeff McInnis guarding him: McInnis tripped & fell in the process, Childress made a motion with his hand as if to say "come here" or "get up," then hit a 3-point shot. He was honored as the ACC Male Athlete of the Year in 1995. In 2002, Childress was named to the ACC 50th Anniversary men's basketball team, honoring the fifty greatest players in ACC history. He was inducted in the North Carolina Sports Hall of Fame in 2024.

== Professional career ==
In the 1995 NBA draft, Childress was selected in the 1st round (19th overall) by the Detroit Pistons. Childress played in two NBA seasons for the Pistons and Portland Trail Blazers, averaging 2.4 points per game. His NBA career was cut short by a torn ACL and disagreements with Trail Blazers coach P. J. Carlesimo.

After leaving the NBA, Childress played in 1997–1999 in the Turkish Basketball League for Tofaş SAS and Konya Kombassan. Childress went on to play ten games for the Sydney Kings in the 2000–01 Australian National Basketball League season. Childress then played for various teams in the Italian leagues.

== Coaching career ==
In April 2012, Childress was hired as the new director of player development at his alma mater, Wake Forest University. In April 2013, Childress was promoted to the position of assistant coach, moving into an on-court role for the team. He left the Wake Forest coaching staff following the 2020–21 season, moving into a strategic role with the athletic department.

== Personal life ==
Childress's son Brandon Childress played basketball at Wake Forest and professionally.
