= 1995 Southland Conference men's basketball tournament =

Basketball Tournament March 1997 in Louisiana

- Classification: Division I
- Season: 1994–95
- Teams: 8
- First round site: Campus Sites; Campus Arenas
- Finals site: Hirsch Memorial Coliseum; Shreveport, Louisiana
- Champions: Nicholls State (1st title)
- Winning coach: Rickey Broussard (1st title)
- MVP: Reggie Jackson (Nicholls State)

1994–95 Southland Conference men's basketball standings
	Conf.				Overall
Team	W		L	PCT	W		L	PCT
Nicholls State †	17	–	1	.944	24	–	6	.800
UTSA	11	–	7	.611	15	–	13	.536
Northeast Louisiana	11	–	7	.611	14	–	18	.438
North Texas	9	–	9	.500	14	–	13	.519
Stephen F. Austin	9	–	9	.500	14	–	14	.500
Northwestern State	8	–	10	.444	13	–	14	.481
Southwest Texas State	7	–	11	.389	12	–	14	.462
McNeese State	7	–	11	.389	11	–	16	.407
Texas-Arlington	7	–	11	.389	10	–	17	.370
Sam Houston State	4	–	14	.222	7	–	19	.269
† 1995 Southland tournament winner Rankings from AP Poll

The 1995 Southland Conference men's basketball tournament was held March 6–11 with the opening round played at campus sites and the semifinal and championship round played at Hirsch Memorial Coliseum in Shreveport, Louisiana.

Nicholls State defeated Northeast Louisiana in the championship game, 98–87, to win their first Southland men's basketball tournament.

The Colonels received a bid to the 1995 NCAA Tournament as the No. 13 seed in the Midwest region.

== Format ==
Six of the ten conference members participated in the tournament field. They were seeded based on regular season conference records, with the top two seeds receiving a bye to the semifinal round. Tournament play began with the quarterfinal round.

== Bracket ==
Quarterfinals; March 6
1	Nicholls State	88
8	McNeese State	69
4	North Texas	72
5	Stephen F. Austin	73
3	Texas-San Antonio	89
6	Northwestern State	79
2	Northeast Louisiana	75
7	Texas-Arlington	61

Semifinals; March 10
1	Nicholls State	91
5	Stephen F. Austin	89
3	Texas-San Antonio	76
2	Northeast Louisiana	78

Championship; March 11
1	Nicholls State	98
2	Northeast Louisiana	87
