= 1994–95 Mississippi State Bulldogs men's basketball team =

American college basketball season

1994–95 Mississippi State Bulldogs men's basketball

SEC West co-champions

NCAA tournament, Sweet Sixteen
- Conference: Southeastern Conference
- West

Ranking
- Coaches: No. 12
- AP: No. 18
- Record: 22–8 (12–4 SEC)
- Head coach: Richard Williams (9th season)
- Assistant coaches: Rick Stansbury (5th season); Greg Carter; Owen Miller
- Home arena: Humphrey Coliseum

1994–95 Southeastern Conference men's basketball standings
| | Conf. | | | | Overall |
| Team | W | | L | PCT | W | | L | PCT |
|---|---|---|---|---|---|---|---|---|
East Division
| No. 2 Kentucky † | 14 | – | 2 | .875 | 28 | – | 5 | .848 |
| Georgia | 9 | – | 7 | .563 | 18 | – | 10 | .643 |
| Florida | 8 | – | 8 | .500 | 17 | – | 13 | .567 |
| Vanderbilt | 6 | – | 10 | .375 | 13 | – | 15 | .464 |
| South Carolina | 5 | – | 11 | .313 | 10 | – | 17 | .370 |
| Tennessee | 4 | – | 12 | .250 | 11 | – | 16 | .407 |
West Division
| No. 6 Arkansas | 12 | – | 4 | .750 | 32 | – | 7 | .821 |
| No. 18 Mississippi State | 12 | – | 4 | .750 | 22 | – | 8 | .733 |
| No. 20 Alabama | 10 | – | 6 | .625 | 23 | – | 10 | .697 |
| Auburn | 7 | – | 9 | .438 | 16 | – | 13 | .552 |
| LSU | 6 | – | 10 | .375 | 12 | – | 15 | .444 |
| Ole Miss | 3 | – | 13 | .188 | 8 | – | 19 | .296 |
† 1995 SEC tournament winner Rankings from AP Poll

The 1994–95 Mississippi State Bulldogs men's basketball team represented Mississippi State University in the 1994–95 NCAA Division I men's basketball season. Led by head coach Richard Williams, the Bulldogs reached the Sweet Sixteen of the 1995 NCAA tournament before losing to eventual National Champion UCLA.

== Roster ==
1994–95 Mississippi State Bulldogs men's basketball team
Players
Coaches

| Pos. | # | Name | Height | Weight | Year | Hometown |
|---|---|---|---|---|---|---|
| G | 3 | Marcus Bullard | 6 ft 3 in (1.91 m) | 200 lb (91 kg) | Jr | Long Beach, Mississippi |
| C | 25 | Erick Dampier | 6 ft 11 in (2.11 m) | 265 lb (120 kg) | So | New Hebron, Mississippi |
| G | 21 | McKie Edmonson | 6 ft 0 in (1.83 m) | 170 lb (77 kg) | Fr | Madison, Mississippi |
| F | 15 | Whit Hughes | 6 ft 5 in (1.96 m) | 210 lb (95 kg) | Fr | Jackson, Mississippi |
| F | 32 | Dontae' Jones | 6 ft 7 in (2.01 m) | 220 lb (100 kg) | So | Nashville, Tennessee |
| F/C | 20 | Russell Walters | 6 ft 10 in (2.08 m) | 235 lb (107 kg) | Jr | Myrick, Mississippi |
| F | 44 | Jay Walton | 6 ft 7 in (2.01 m) | 225 lb (102 kg) | Jr | Pascagoula, Mississippi |
| C | 33 | Bubba Wilson | 6 ft 10 in (2.08 m) | 240 lb (109 kg) | Jr | Wiggins, Mississippi |
| G | 00 | Darryl Wilson | 6 ft 1 in (1.85 m) | 185 lb (84 kg) | Jr | Kennedy, Alabama |

Head coach

- Richard Williams

Assistant coach(es)

- Rick Stansbury
- Greg Carter
- Owen Miller

Legend

- (C) Team captain
- (S) Suspended
- (I) Ineligible
- (W) Walk-on
- Injured
- Current redshirt

== Schedule and results ==
| Date time, TV | Rank^{#} | Opponent^{#} | Result | Record | Site city, state |
Regular season
| Nov 28, 1994* | | Southeastern Louisiana | W 106–67 | 1–0 | Humphrey Coliseum; Starkville, Mississippi |
| Dec 2, 1994* | | vs. Colgate | W 80–76 | 2–0 | Dahlberg Arena; Missoula, Montana |
| Dec 3, 1994* | | at Montana | W 90–85 ^{2OT} | 3–0 | Dahlberg Arena; Missoula, Montana |
| Dec 6, 1994* | | at BYU | L 68–74 ^{OT} | 3–1 | Marriott Center; Provo, Utah |
| Dec 10, 1994* | | Northeast Louisiana | W 70–56 | 4–1 | Humphrey Coliseum; Starkville, Mississippi |
| Dec 17, 1994* | | vs. Southern Miss | L 64–66 | 4–2 | Mississippi Coast Coliseum; Biloxi, Mississippi |
| Dec 27, 1994* | | vs. Saint Joseph's | W 76–66 | 5–2 | Casper Events Center; Casper, Wyoming |
| Dec 28, 1994* | | vs. Wyoming | W 61–57 | 6–2 | Casper Events Center; Casper, Wyoming |
| Jan 3, 1995 | | South Carolina | W 71–56 | 7–2 (1–0) | Humphrey Coliseum; Starkville, Mississippi |
| Jan 7, 1995 | | at Georgia | W 60–59 | 8–2 (2–0) | Stegeman Coliseum; Athens, Georgia |
| Jan 11, 1995 | | at No. 5 Arkansas | L 74–79 | 8–3 (2–1) | Bud Walton Arena; Fayetteville, Arkansas |
| Jan 14, 1995 | | Ole Miss | W 94–52 | 9–3 (3–1) | Humphrey Coliseum; Starkville, Mississippi |
| Jan 16, 1995* | | Northwestern State | W 98–58 | 10–3 | Humphrey Coliseum; Starkville, Mississippi |
| Jan 21, 1995 | | at Alabama | L 64–68 | 10–4 (3–2) | Coleman Coliseum; Tuscaloosa, Alabama |
| Jan 25, 1995 | | LSU | W 73–60 | 11–4 (4–2) | Humphrey Coliseum; Starkville, Mississippi |
| Jan 30, 1995* | | Nicholls State | W 81–65 | 12–4 | Humphrey Coliseum; Starkville, Mississippi |
| Feb 1, 1995 | | No. 25 Florida | W 70–47 | 13–4 (5–2) | Humphrey Coliseum; Starkville, Mississippi |
| Feb 4, 1995 | | No. 8 Arkansas | W 83–62 | 14–4 (6–2) | Humphrey Coliseum; Starkville, Mississippi |
| Feb 8, 1995 | No. 21 | at LSU | W 67–61 | 15–4 (7–2) | Maravich Assembly Center; Baton Rouge, Louisiana |
| Feb 11, 1995 | No. 21 | Auburn | L 69–70 | 15–5 (7–3) | Humphrey Coliseum; Starkville, Mississippi |
| Feb 14, 1995 | No. 23 | at No. 4 Kentucky | W 76–71 | 16–5 (8–3) | Rupp Arena; Lexington, Kentucky |
| Feb 18, 1995 | No. 23 | at Tennessee | W 60–52 | 17–5 (9–3) | Thompson-Boling Arena; Knoxville, Tennessee |
| Feb 22, 1995* | No. 16 | Vanderbilt | W 76–48 | 18–5 (10–3) | Humphrey Coliseum; Starkville, Mississippi |
| Feb 25, 1995 | No. 16 | at Ole Miss | W 46–42 | 19–5 (11–3) | Tad Smith Coliseum; Oxford, Mississippi |
| Mar 1, 1995 | No. 14 | at Auburn | L 69–76 | 19–6 (11–4) | Beard-Eaves-Memorial Coliseum; Auburn, Alabama |
| Mar 4, 1995 | No. 14 | No. 21 Alabama | W 71–67 | 20–6 (12–4) | Humphrey Coliseum; Starkville, Mississippi |
SEC Tournament
| Mar 10, 1995* | No. 15 | vs. Florida; Quarterfinals | L 64–80 | 20–7 | Georgia Dome; Atlanta, Georgia |
NCAA Tournament
| Mar 17, 1995* | (5 W) No. 18 | vs. (12 W) Santa Clara; Second Round | W 75–67 | 21–7 | BSU Pavilion; Boise, Idaho |
| Mar 19, 1995* | (5 W) No. 18 | vs. (4 W) No. 19 Utah; Second Round | W 78–64 | 22–7 | BSU Pavilion; Boise, Idaho |
| Mar 23, 1995* | (5 W) No. 18 | vs. (1 W) No. 1 UCLA; West Regional semifinal – Sweet Sixteen | L 67–86 | 22–8 | Oakland–Alameda County Coliseum Arena (14,399); Oakland, California |
*Non-conference game. ^{#}Rankings from AP Poll. (#) Tournament seedings in parentheses. W=West.
