= 1995 NCAA Division I men's basketball tournament =

Edition of USA college basketball tournament

- Season: 1994–95
- Teams: 64
- Finals site: Kingdome, Seattle, Washington
- Champions: UCLA Bruins (11th title, 12th title game, 15th Final Four)
- Runner-up: Arkansas Razorbacks (2nd title game, 6th Final Four)
- Semifinalists: North Carolina Tar Heels (12th Final Four); Oklahoma State Cowboys (5th Final Four)
- Winning coach: Jim Harrick (1st title)
- MOP: Ed O'Bannon (UCLA)
- Attendance: 540,101
- Top scorer: Corliss Williamson (Arkansas) (125 points)

The 1995 NCAA Division I men's basketball tournament involved 64 schools playing in single-elimination play to determine the national champion of men's NCAA Division I college basketball. The 57th annual edition of the tournament began on March 16, 1995, and ended with the championship game on April 3 at the Kingdome in Seattle, Washington. This Final Four would be the last time that the Final Four was hosted in the Western United States until the 2017 edition of the tournament where Glendale, Arizona, was the host. A total of 63 games were played.

The Final Four consisted of UCLA, making their fifteenth appearance and first since the 1980 team that eventually saw their appearance vacated, Oklahoma State, making their fifth appearance and first since 1951, North Carolina, making their twelfth appearance and second in three years, and Arkansas, the defending national champions.

The championship game saw UCLA win their eleventh national championship and first (and only) national title under Jim Harrick by defeating Arkansas 89–78, foiling the Razorbacks' hopes of back to back national titles.

UCLA's Ed O'Bannon was named the tournament's Most Outstanding Player.

== Schedule and venues ==
1995 first and second rounds
1995 Regionals (blue) and Final Four (red)

The following are the sites that were selected to host each round of the 1995 tournament:

First and Second Rounds

- March 16 and 18
  - East Region
    - Baltimore Arena, Baltimore, Maryland (Host: University of Maryland Baltimore County)
  - Midwest Region
    - University of Dayton Arena, Dayton, Ohio (Host: University of Dayton)
  - Southeast Region
    - Memphis Pyramid, Memphis, Tennessee (Host: University of Memphis)
  - West Region
    - Jon M. Huntsman Center, Salt Lake City, Utah (Host: University of Utah)
- March 17 and 19
  - East Region
    - Knickerbocker Arena, Albany, New York (Hosts: Siena College, Metro Atlantic Athletic Conference)
  - Midwest Region
    - Frank Erwin Center, Austin, Texas (Host: University of Texas at Austin)
  - Southeast Region
    - Tallahassee-Leon County Civic Center, Tallahassee, Florida (Host: Florida State University)
  - West Region
    - BSU Pavilion, Boise, Idaho (Host: Boise State University)

Regional semifinals and finals (Sweet Sixteen and Elite Eight)

- March 23 and 25
  - Southeast Regional, BJCC Coliseum, Birmingham, Alabama (Host: Southeastern Conference)
  - West Regional, Oakland–Alameda County Coliseum Arena, Oakland, California (Host: University of California, Berkeley)
- March 24 and 26
  - East Regional, Brendan Byrne Arena, East Rutherford, New Jersey (Hosts: Seton Hall University, Big East Conference)
  - Midwest Regional, Kemper Arena, Kansas City, Missouri (Host: Missouri Valley Conference)

National semifinals and championship (Final Four and championship)

- April 1 and 3
  - Kingdome, Seattle, Washington (Hosts: Seattle University, University of Washington)

== Teams ==
There were 29 automatic bids awarded to the tournament - of these, 26 were given to the winners of their conference's tournament, while three were awarded to the team with the best regular-season record in their conference (Big Ten, Ivy League and Pac-10).

Four conferences, the American West Conference, Big South Conference, Great Midwest Conference, and Mid-Continent Conference, did not receive automatic bids to the tournament.

Five conference champions made their first NCAA tournament appearances: Colgate (Patriot), FIU (TAAC), Gonzaga (West Coast), Mount St. Mary's (NEC), and Nicholls State (Southland).

=== Automatic qualifiers ===
Automatic qualifiers
Conference	Team	Appearance	Last bid
ACC	Wake Forest	13th	1994
Atlantic 10	UMass	5th	1994
Big East	Villanova	21st	1991
Big Eight	Oklahoma State	14th	1994
Big Sky	Weber State	11th	1983
Big Ten	Purdue	14th	1994
Big West	Long Beach State	4th	1993
CAA	Old Dominion	6th	1992
Ivy League	Penn	16th	1994
MAAC	Saint Peter's	2nd	1991
MAC	Ball State	6th	1993
MCC	Green Bay	3rd	1994
MEAC	North Carolina A&T	9th	1994
Metro	Louisville	25th	1994
Missouri Valley	Southern Illinois	4th	1994
NAC	Drexel	3rd	1994
NEC	Mount St. Mary's	1st	Never
Ohio Valley	Murray State	7th	1992
Pac-10	UCLA	30th	1994
Patriot	Colgate	1st	Never
SEC	Kentucky	36th	1994
Southern	Chattanooga	7th	1994
Southland	Nicholls State	1st	Never
Sun Belt	Western Kentucky	15th	1994
SWAC	Texas Southern	3rd	1994
SWC	Texas	14th	1994
TAAC	FIU	1st	Never
WAC	Utah	17th	1993
West Coast	Gonzaga	1st	Never

=== Tournament seeds ===
East Regional – Brendan Byrne Arena, East Rutherford, New Jersey
Seed	School	Conference	Record	Berth type
1	Wake Forest	ACC	24–5	Automatic
2	UMass	Atlantic 10	26–4	Automatic
3	Villanova	Big East	25–7	Automatic
4	Oklahoma State	Big Eight	23–9	Automatic
5	Alabama	SEC	22–9	At-Large
6	Tulsa	Missouri Valley	22–7	At-Large
7	UNC Charlotte	Metro	19–8	At-Large
8	Minnesota (vacated)	Big Ten	19–11	At-Large
9	Saint Louis	Great Midwest	22–7	At-Large
10	Stanford	Pac-10	19–8	At-Large
11	Illinois	Big Ten	19–11	At-Large
12	Penn	Ivy League	22–5	Automatic
13	Drexel	NAC	22–7	Automatic
14	Old Dominion	CAA	20–11	Automatic
15	Saint Peter's	MAAC	19–10	Automatic
16	North Carolina A&T	MEAC	15–14	Automatic

West Regional – Oakland–Alameda County Coliseum Arena, Oakland, California
Seed	School	Conference	Record	Berth type
1	UCLA	Pac-10	25–2	Automatic
2	Connecticut	Big East	25–4	At-Large
3	Maryland	ACC	24–7	At-Large
4	Utah	WAC	27–5	Automatic
5	Mississippi State	SEC	20–7	At-Large
6	Oregon	Pac-10	19–8	At-Large
7	Cincinnati	Great Midwest	21–11	At-Large
8	Missouri	Big Eight	19–8	At-Large
9	Indiana	Big Ten	19–11	At-Large
10	Temple	Atlantic 10	19–10	At-Large
11	Texas	SWC	22–6	Automatic
12	Santa Clara	West Coast	21–6	At-Large
13	Long Beach State	Big West	20–9	Automatic
14	Gonzaga	West Coast	21–8	Automatic
15	Chattanooga	Southern	19–10	Automatic
16	FIU	TAAC	11–18	Automatic

Southeast Regional – BJCC Coliseum, Birmingham, Alabama
Seed	School	Conference	Record	Berth type
1	Kentucky	SEC	25–4	Automatic
2	North Carolina	ACC	24–5	At-Large
3	Michigan State	Big Ten	22–5	At-Large
4	Oklahoma	Big Eight	23–8	At-Large
5	Arizona State (vacated)	Pac-10	22–8	At-Large
6	Georgetown	Big East	19–9	At-Large
7	Iowa State	Big Eight	22–10	At-Large
8	BYU	WAC	22–9	At-Large
9	Tulane	Metro	22–9	At-Large
10	Florida	SEC	17–12	At-Large
11	Xavier	MCC	23–4	At-Large
12	Ball State	MAC	19–10	Automatic
13	Manhattan	MAAC	25–4	At-Large
14	Weber State	Big Sky	20–8	Automatic
15	Murray State	Ohio Valley	21–8	Automatic
16	Mount St. Mary's	NEC	17–12	Automatic

Midwest Regional – Kemper Arena, Kansas City, Missouri
Seed	School	Conference	Record	Berth type
1	Kansas	Big Eight	23–5	At-Large
2	Arkansas	SEC	27–6	At-Large
3	Purdue	Big Ten	24–6	Automatic
4	Virginia	ACC	22–8	At-Large
5	Arizona	Pac-10	23–7	At-Large
6	Memphis	Great Midwest	22–9	At-Large
7	Syracuse	Big East	19–9	At-Large
8	Western Kentucky	Sun Belt	26–3	Automatic
9	Michigan	Big Ten	17–13	At-Large
10	Southern Illinois	Missouri Valley	23–8	Automatic
11	Louisville	Metro	19–13	Automatic
12	Miami (OH)	MAC	22–6	At-Large
13	Nicholls State	Southland	24–5	Automatic
14	Green Bay	MCC	22–7	Automatic
15	Texas Southern	SWAC	22–6	Automatic
16	Colgate	Patriot	17–12	Automatic

== Bracket ==
=== East Regional – East Rutherford, New Jersey ===
First round
1	Wake Forest	79
16	North Carolina A&T	47
Baltimore
8	Minnesota#	61
9	Saint Louis	64^{OT}
5	Alabama	91^{OT}
12	Penn	85
Baltimore
4	Oklahoma State	73
13	Drexel	49
6	Tulsa	68
11	Illinois	62
Albany
3	Villanova	81
14	Old Dominion	89^{3OT}
7	UNC Charlotte	68
10	Stanford	70
Albany
2	Massachusetts	68
15	Saint Peter's	51

Second round
1	Wake Forest	64
9	Saint Louis	59
5	Alabama	52
4	Oklahoma State	66
6	Tulsa	64
14	Old Dominion	52
10	Stanford	53
2	Massachusetts	75

Regional semifinals
1	Wake Forest	66
4	Oklahoma State	71
6	Tulsa	51
2	Massachusetts	76

Regional Finals
4	Oklahoma State	68
2	Massachusetts	54

# Minnesota vacated its NCAA Tournament appearance from the 1994–95 season due to an academic fraud scandal.

=== Game summaries ===
==== East first round ====
===== At Albany, New York =====
CBS

Friday, March 17
12:30 pm EST

box score

#10 Stanford Cardinal 70, #7 North Carolina-Charlotte 49ers 68

Knickerbocker Arena – Albany, New York
Attendance: 15,100

CBS

Friday, March 17
approx. 3:00 pm EST

box score

#2 Massachusetts Minutemen 68, #15 Saint Peter's Peacocks 51

Knickerbocker Arena – Albany, New York
Attendance: 15,100

CBS

Friday, March 17
7:40 pm EST

box score

#14 Old Dominion Monarchs 89, #3 Villanova Wildcats 81 (3OT)

Knickerbocker Arena – Albany, New York
Attendance: 15,100
Referees: Scott Thornley, Lonnie Dixon, Paul Janssen

CBS

Friday, March 17
approx. 10:10 pm EST

box score

#6 Tulsa Golden Hurricane 68, #11 Illinois Fighting Illini 62
Pts: S. Seals – 22; Rebs: R. Poindexter – 12; Asts: A. Williamson – 4	Pts: K. Garris – 24; Rebs: S. Clark – 12; Asts: J. Hester, R. Keene – 2 Halftime Score: Illinois, 34–27

Knickerbocker Arena – Albany, New York
Attendance: 15,100
Referees: David Libbey, Richie Ballesteros, Larry Ware

==== East second round ====
===== At Albany, New York =====
CBS

Sunday, March 19
12:25 pm EST

box score

#2 Massachusetts Minutemen 75, #10 Stanford Cardinal 53

Knickerbocker Arena – Albany, New York
Attendance: 15,100

CBS

Sunday, March 19
approx. 2:55 pm EST

box score

#6 Tulsa Golden Hurricane 64, #14 Old Dominion Monarchs 52

Knickerbocker Arena – Albany, New York
Attendance: 15,100
Referees: David Libbey, Scott Thornley, Paul Janssen

=== West Regional – Oakland, California ===
First round
1	UCLA	92
16	FIU	56
Boise
8	Missouri	65
9	Indiana	60
5	Mississippi State	75
12	Santa Clara	67
Boise
4	Utah	76
13	Long Beach State	64
6	Oregon	73
11	Texas	90
Salt Lake City
3	Maryland	87
14	Gonzaga	63
7	Cincinnati	77
10	Temple	71
Salt Lake City
2	Connecticut	100
15	Chattanooga	71

Second round
1	UCLA	75
8	Missouri	74
5	Mississippi State	78
4	Utah	64
11	Texas	68
3	Maryland	82
7	Cincinnati	91
2	Connecticut	96

Regional semifinals
1	UCLA	86
5	Mississippi State	67
3	Maryland	89
2	Connecticut	99

Regional Finals
1	UCLA	102
2	Connecticut	96

=== Southeast Regional – Birmingham, Alabama ===
First round
1	Kentucky	113
16	Mount St. Mary's	67
Memphis
8	BYU	70
9	Tulane	76
5	Arizona State	81
12	Ball State	66
Memphis
4	Oklahoma	67
13	Manhattan	77
6	Georgetown	68
11	Xavier	63
Tallahassee
3	Michigan State	72
14	Weber State	79
7	Iowa State	64
10	Florida	61
Tallahassee
2	North Carolina	80
15	Murray State	70

Second round
1	Kentucky	82
9	Tulane	60
5	Arizona State	64
13	Manhattan	54
6	Georgetown	53
14	Weber State	51
7	Iowa State	51
2	North Carolina	73

Regional semifinals
1	Kentucky	97
5	Arizona State	73
6	Georgetown	64
2	North Carolina	74

Regional Finals
1	Kentucky	61
2	North Carolina	74

=== Midwest Regional – Kansas City, Missouri ===
First round
1	Kansas	82
16	Colgate	68
Dayton
8	Western Kentucky	82^{OT}
9	Michigan	76
5	Arizona	62
12	Miami (OH)	71
Dayton
4	Virginia	96
13	Nicholls State	72
6	Memphis	77
11	Louisville	56
Austin
3	Purdue	49
14	UW–Green Bay	48
7	Syracuse	96
10	Southern Illinois	92
Austin
2	Arkansas	79
15	Texas Southern	78

Second round
1	Kansas	75
8	Western Kentucky	70
12	Miami (OH)	54
4	Virginia	60^{OT}
6	Memphis	75
3	Purdue	73
7	Syracuse	94
2	Arkansas	96^{OT}

Regional semifinals
1	Kansas	58
4	Virginia	67
6	Memphis	91
2	Arkansas	96^{OT}

Regional Finals
4	Virginia	61
2	Arkansas	68

=== Final Four - Seattle, Washington ===
National semifinals
E4	Oklahoma State	61
W1	UCLA	74
SE2	North Carolina	68
MW2	Arkansas	75

National Championship Game
W1	UCLA	89
MW2	Arkansas	78

=== Game summaries ===
CBS

Saturday, April 1

box score

#1 UCLA Bruins 74, #4 Oklahoma State Cowboys 61
Pts: T. Edney 21; Rebs: E. O'Bannon 8 Asts: Tyus Edney 5	Pts: B. Reeves 25; Rebs: B. Reeves 9 Asts: A. Owens 9 Halftime Score: 37–37

Kingdome – Seattle
Attendance: 38,540

CBS

Saturday, April 1

box score

#2 Arkansas Razorbacks 75, #2 North Carolina Tar Heels 68
Pts: C. Williamson 21; Rebs: C. Williamson 10; Asts: C. Beck 10	Pts: D. Williams 19; Rebs: R. Wallace 10; Asts: D. Calabria 9 Halftime Score: North Carolina, 38–34

Kingdome – Seattle
Attendance: 38,540

=== National Championship ===
CBS

Monday, April 3
8:40 pm

Box score

#1 UCLA Bruins 89, #2 Arkansas Razorbacks 78
Pts: E. O'Bannon 30; Rebs: Ed O'Bannon 17; Asts: C. Dollar 8	Pts: C. McDaniel 16; Rebs: D. Stewart 5 Asts: C. Williamson 6 Halftime Score: UCLA, 40–39

Kingdome – Seattle
Attendance: 38,540

Final Four All-Tournament Team
Player	Team
Ed O'Bannon*	UCLA
Toby Bailey	UCLA
Corliss Williamson	Arkansas
Clint McDaniel	Arkansas
Bryant Reeves	Oklahoma State

*Named Most Outstanding Player

== See also ==
- 1995 NCAA Division II men's basketball tournament
- 1995 NCAA Division III men's basketball tournament
- 1995 NCAA Division I women's basketball tournament
- 1995 NCAA Division II women's basketball tournament
- 1995 NCAA Division III women's basketball tournament
- 1995 National Invitation Tournament
- 1995 National Women's Invitation Tournament
- 1995 NAIA Division I men's basketball tournament
- 1995 NAIA Division II men's basketball tournament
- 1995 NAIA Division I women's basketball tournament
- 1995 NAIA Division II women's basketball tournament

== Notes ==
- March 19, 1995 – A final shot in the second round at The Boise State Pavilion is one of the most memorable moments in NCAA history. UCLA's Tyus Edney dashed the length of the 94-foot court in just over 4 seconds to make a layup that gave the Bruins a 75–74 win over Missouri, which sustained UCLA's run to a national title that year.
- April 3, 1995 – Ed O'Bannon scored 30 points and grabbed 17 rebounds and is named the tournament's Most Outstanding Player as the Bruins win the championship 89–78 over Arkansas. Cameron Dollar played 36 minutes and contributed eight assists and four steals while filling in for an injured Edney, who did not return after leaving with 17:23 left in the first half. The Bruins enjoyed the biggest lead 34–26 in the first half, but led only by a point at halftime 40–39.
- To date, this is the last NCAA men's basketball tournament in which no team seeded lower than #6 reached the Sweet Sixteen.
- Five teams - Colgate, FIU, Gonzaga, Mount St. Mary's and Nicholls State - made their debut in this tournament, all as conference winners. Only FIU has failed to return to the tournament since; Gonzaga would miss the next three tournaments before starting their current streak of making every tournament since 1999.
- The 1995 tournament was the last to feature teams from the Metro and Great Midwest Conferences, as the two would merge later that year to form Conference USA.
  - Tulane, a charter member of the Metro (expelled from the conference from 1985 to 1989 when the Green Wave shuttered their men's basketball program in the wake of a point shaving scandal), has not returned to the NCAA tournament since.

== Announcers ==
=== Television ===
Once again, CBS served as broadcasters on television for the tournament.

- Studio: Pat O'Brien (daytime) First round, Regional, Final Four, Jim Nantz (primetime) First round & all of Second Round, and Clark Kellogg.
- Dick Stockton/Jim Nantz and Billy Packer – Stockton/Packer, First & Second Round at Baltimore, Maryland; Nantz/Packer, Midwest Regional at Kansas City, Missouri; Final Four at Seattle, Washington
- Sean McDonough and Bill Raftery – First & Second Round at Dayton, Ohio; Southeast Regional at Birmingham, Alabama
- Verne Lundquist and Quinn Buckner – First & Second Round at Tallahassee, Florida; East Regional at East Rutherford, New Jersey
- Tim Ryan and Al McGuire – First & Second Round at Boise, Idaho; West Regional at Oakland, California
- Mike Gorman and Ann Meyers – First & Second Round at Memphis, Tennessee
- Mike Emrick and George Raveling – First & Second Round at Albany, New York
- Ted Robinson and Derrek Dickey – First & Second Round at Salt Lake City, Utah
- Dave Sims and Dan Bonner – First & Second Round at Austin, Texas

=== Radio ===
CBS Radio was once again the radio home for the tournament.

==== First and second rounds ====
- John Rooney
- Marty Brennaman
- Gary Cohen and Dave Gavitt – 1st & 2nd Round at Albany, New York
- Wayne Larrivee
- Brad Sham
- Gus Johnson and Reggie Theus

==== Regionals ====
- John Rooney
- Marty Brennaman
- Gary Cohen and Dave Gavitt – East Regional at East Rutherford, New Jersey
- Wayne Larrivee

==== Final Four ====
- John Rooney and Bill Raftery – (UCLA-Oklahoma State and championship Game) Final Four at Seattle, Washington
- Marty Brennaman and Ron Franklin – (Arkansas-North Carolina) Final Four at Seattle, Washington
