= 1994–95 Kentucky Wildcats men's basketball team =

1994–95 season of University of Kentucky men's basketball team

1994–95 Kentucky Wildcats men's basketball
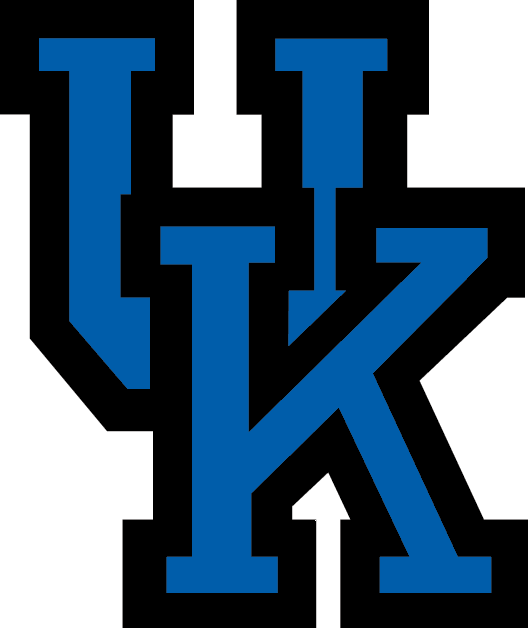

SEC regular season and tournament champions

NCAA tournament, Elite Eight
- Conference: Southeast Conference

Ranking
- Coaches: No. 5
- AP: No. 2
- Record: 28–5 (14–2 SEC)
- Head coach: Rick Pitino (6th season)
- Assistant coaches: Jim O'Brien; Winston Bennett; Delray Brooks
- Home arena: Rupp Arena

1994–95 Southeastern Conference men's basketball standings
	Conf.				Overall
Team	W		L	PCT	W		L	PCT
East Division
No. 2 Kentucky †	14	–	2	.875	28	–	5	.848
Georgia	9	–	7	.563	18	–	10	.643
Florida	8	–	8	.500	17	–	13	.567
Vanderbilt	6	–	10	.375	13	–	15	.464
South Carolina	5	–	11	.313	10	–	17	.370
Tennessee	4	–	12	.250	11	–	16	.407
West Division
No. 6 Arkansas	12	–	4	.750	32	–	7	.821
No. 18 Mississippi State	12	–	4	.750	22	–	8	.733
No. 20 Alabama	10	–	6	.625	23	–	10	.697
Auburn	7	–	9	.438	16	–	13	.552
LSU	6	–	10	.375	12	–	15	.444
Ole Miss	3	–	13	.188	8	–	19	.296
† 1995 SEC tournament winner Rankings from AP Poll

The 1994–95 Kentucky Wildcats men's basketball team represented University of Kentucky. The head coach was Rick Pitino. The team was a member of the Southeast Conference and played their home games at Rupp Arena. In the 1995 NCAA Tournament Kentucky was the #1 seed. The Wildcats advanced all the way to the Elite 8 before losing to North Carolina 74–61.

== Roster ==
1994–95 Kentucky Wildcats men's basketball team
Players
Coaches

Pos.	#	Name	Height	Weight	Year	Previous school	Hometown
G	00	Tony Delk	6 ft 1 in (1.85 m)	—	Jr	Brownsville, TN
G/F	3	Allen Edwards	6 ft 5 in (1.96 m)	—	Fr	Miami, FL
G	15	Jeff Sheppard	6 ft 4 in (1.93 m)	—	So	Peachtree City, GA
G	21	Cameron Mills	6 ft 3 in (1.91 m)	—	Fr	Lexington, KY
F	24	Antoine Walker	6 ft 8 in (2.03 m)	—	Fr	Chicago, IL
F	40	Walter McCarty	6 ft 11 in (2.11 m)	—	So	Evansville, IN
C	41	Mark Pope	6 ft 10 in (2.08 m)	—	Jr	Bellevue, WA

Head coach

- Rick Pitino (UMass)

Assistant coach(es)

Legend

- (C) Team captain
- (S) Suspended
- (I) Ineligible
- (W) Walk-on
- Injured
- Current redshirt

== Schedule ==
Date time, TV	Rank^{#}	Opponent^{#}	Result	Record	Site (attendance) city, state
Exhibition
11/9/1994* no, no		Athletes in Action	W 122–86		Rupp Arena (–); Lexington, KY
11/22/1994* no, no		Lithuania	W 114–81		Rupp Arena (–); Lexington, KY
Regular Season
11/26/1994* no, no	No. 4	Tennessee-Martin	W 124–50	1–0	Rupp Arena (23,785); Lexington, KY
11/30/1994* no, no	No. 3	No. 14 Ohio	W 79–74	2–0	Rupp Arena (24,212); Lexington, KY
12/3/1994* no, no	No. 3	vs. No. 5 UCLA; John R. Wooden Classic	L 81–82	2–1	The Pond (18,307); Anaheim, CA
12/7/1994* no, no	No. 7	vs. Indiana	W 73–70	3–1	Freedom Hall (19,825); Louisville, KY
12/10/1994* no, no	No. 7	Boston University	W 90–49	4–1	Rupp Arena (23,650); Lexington, KY
12/17/1994* no, no	No. 6	vs. Texas Tech	W 83–68	5–1	Riverfront Coliseum (17,153); Cincinnati, OH
12/27/1994* no, no	No. 5	Marshall	W 116–75	6–1	Rupp Arena (23,782); Lexington, KY
1/1/1995* no, no	No. 5	at Louisville	L 86–88	6–2	Freedom Hall (19,841); Louisville, KY
01/04/1995 no, no	No. 8	Auburn	W 98–64	7–2 (1–0)	Rupp Arena (23,805); Lexington, KY
01/07/1995 no, no	No. 8	at South Carolina	W 80–55	8–2 (2–0)	Frank McGuire Arena (10,582); Columbia, SC
01/10/1995 no, no	No. 7	at No. 15 Florida	W 83–67	9–2 (3–0)	Stephen C. O'Connell Center (11,902); Gainesville, FL
01/14/1995 no, no	No. 7	Georgia	W 83–71	10–2 (4–0)	Rupp Arena (23,625); Lexington, KY
01/18/1995 no, JPS	No. 5	vs. Mississippi	W 82–65	11–2 (5–0)	The Pyramid (12,073); Memphis, TN
01/21/1995 no, no	No. 5	Vanderbilt	W 81–68	12–2 (6–0)	Rupp Arena (23,222); Lexington, KY
01/25/1995 no, no	No. 5	Tennessee	W 69–50	13–2 (7–0)	Rupp Arena (23,427); Lexington, KY
01/29/1995 no, no	No. 5	at No. 9 Arkansas	L 92–94	13–3 (7–1)	Bud Walton Arena (20,298); Fayetteville, AR
02/01/1995 no, no	No. 6	South Carolina	W 90–72	14–3 (8–1)	Rupp Arena (22,974); Lexington, KY
02/05/1995* no, no	No. 6	No. 10 Syracuse	W 77–71	15–3	Rupp Arena (24,255); Lexington, KY
02/08/1995 no, JPS	No. 5	at Tennessee	W 68–48	16–3 (9–1)	Thompson-Boling Arena (20,118); Knoxville, TN
02/12/1995* no, no	No. 5	at Notre Dame	W 97–58	17–3	Joyce Athletic Center (11,418); Notre Dame, IN
02/14/1995 no, no	No. 4	No. 23 Mississippi State	L 71–76	17–4 (9–2)	Rupp Arena (24,125); Lexington, KY
02/18/1995; 3:00 p.m., JPS	No. 4	Florida	W 87–77	18–4 (10–2)	Rupp Arena (24,320); Lexington, KY
02/21/1995 no, no	No. 6	at No. 20 Alabama	W 72–52	19–4 (11–2)	Coleman Coliseum (15,043); Tuscaloosa, AL
02/25/1995 no, no	No. 6	at Vanderbilt	W 71–60	20–4 (12–2)	Memorial Gymnasium (15,208); Nashville, TN
03/01/1995 no, no	No. 5	at Georgia	W 97–74	21–4 (13–2)	Stegeman Coliseum (10,523); Athens, GA
03/04/1995 no, no	No. 5	Louisiana State	W 127–80	22–4 (14–2)	Rupp Arena (24,325); Lexington, KY
1995 SEC tournament
03/10/1995 no, JPS	(E1) No. 3	vs. (W4) Auburn; Quarterfinals	W 93–81	23–4	Georgia Dome (26,049); Atlanta, GA
03/11/1995 no, JPS	(E1) No. 3	vs. (E3) Florida; Semifinals	W 86–72	24–4	Georgia Dome (28,966); Atlanta, GA
03/12/1995 no, JPS, ESPN	(E1) No. 3	vs. (W1) No. 5 Arkansas; Championship Game	W 95–93 ^{OT}	25–4	Georgia Dome (30,067); Atlanta, GA
1995 NCAA tournament (Tournament seeding in parentheses)
03/16/1995* no, CBS	(1 SE) No. 2	vs. (16 SE) Mount St. Mary's; First Round	W 113–67	26–4	The Pyramid (19,120); Memphis, TN
03/18/1995* no, CBS	(1 SE) No. 2	vs. (9 SE) Tulane; Second Round	W 82–60	27–4	The Pyramid (19,120); Memphis, TN
03/23/1995* no, CBS	(1 SE) No. 2	vs. (5 SE) No. 16 Arizona State; Sweet Sixteen	W 97–73	28–4	Birmingham-Jefferson Civic Center (17,458); Birmingham, AL
03/25/1995*; CBS	(1 SE) No. 2	vs. (2 SE) No. 4 North Carolina; Elite Eight	L 61–74	28–5	Birmingham-Jefferson Civic Center (17,721); Birmingham, AL
*Non-conference game. ^{#}Rankings from AP Poll. (#) Tournament seedings in parentheses.

== Team players drafted into the NBA ==
No one from the Wildcats was claimed in the 1995 NBA draft.
