= 1994–95 Auburn Tigers men's basketball team =

American college basketball season

1994–95 Auburn Tigers men's basketball

NIT, First Round
- Conference: Southeastern Conference
- West
- Record: 16–13 (7–9 SEC)
- Head coach: Cliff Ellis (1st season)
- Captains: Wes Flanigan; Moochie Norris; Lance Weems
- Home arena: Beard–Eaves–Memorial Coliseum

1994–95 Southeastern Conference men's basketball standings
	Conf.				Overall
Team	W		L	PCT	W		L	PCT
East Division
No. 2 Kentucky †	14	–	2	.875	28	–	5	.848
Georgia	9	–	7	.563	18	–	10	.643
Florida	8	–	8	.500	17	–	13	.567
Vanderbilt	6	–	10	.375	13	–	15	.464
South Carolina	5	–	11	.313	10	–	17	.370
Tennessee	4	–	12	.250	11	–	16	.407
West Division
No. 6 Arkansas	12	–	4	.750	32	–	7	.821
No. 18 Mississippi State	12	–	4	.750	22	–	8	.733
No. 20 Alabama	10	–	6	.625	23	–	10	.697
Auburn	7	–	9	.438	16	–	13	.552
LSU	6	–	10	.375	12	–	15	.444
Ole Miss	3	–	13	.188	8	–	19	.296
† 1995 SEC tournament winner Rankings from AP Poll

The 1994–95 Auburn Tigers men's basketball team represented Auburn University in the 1994–95 college basketball season. The team's head coach was Cliff Ellis, who was in his first season at Auburn. The team played their home games at Beard–Eaves–Memorial Coliseum in Auburn, Alabama. They finished the season 16–13, 7–9 in SEC play. They defeated South Carolina to advance to the quarterfinals of the SEC tournament where they lost to Kentucky. They received an invitation to the National Invitation Tournament, where they lost to Marquette in the first round.
