= 1994–95 Temple Owls men's basketball team =

American college basketball season

1994–95 Temple Owls men's basketball

NCAA tournament
- Conference: Atlantic 10 Conference
- Record: 19–11 (10–6 A–10)
- Head coach: John Chaney (13th season)
- Home arena: McGonigle Hall (Capacity: 4,500)

1994–95 Atlantic 10 men's basketball standings
	Conf.				Overall
Team	W		L	PCT	W		L	PCT
No. 7 UMass †	13	–	3	.813	29	–	5	.853
Temple	10	–	6	.625	19	–	11	.633
George Washington	10	–	6	.625	18	–	14	.563
Saint Joseph's	9	–	7	.563	17	–	12	.586
St. Bonaventure	9	–	7	.563	18	–	13	.581
West Virginia	7	–	9	.438	13	–	13	.500
Rutgers	7	–	9	.438	13	–	15	.464
Duquesne	5	–	11	.313	10	–	18	.357
Rhode Island	2	–	14	.125	7	–	20	.259
† 1995 Atlantic 10 Tournament winner Rankings from AP Poll

The 1994–95 Temple Owls men's basketball team represented Temple University as a member of the Atlantic 10 Conference during the 1994–95 NCAA Division I men's basketball season. The team was led by head coach John Chaney and played their home games at McGonigle Hall. The Owls received an at-large bid to the NCAA tournament as No. 10 seed in the West region. Temple was defeated by No. 7 seed Cincinnati, 77–71. The team finished with a record of 23–8 (12–4 A-10).

== Roster ==
1994–95 Temple Owls men's basketball team
Players
Coaches

Pos.	#	Name	Height	Weight	Year	Previous school	Hometown
PG	4	Rick Brunson	6 ft 4 in (1.93 m)	180 lb (82 kg)	Sr	Salem HS	Salem, MA
C	33	William Cunningham	6 ft 11 in (2.11 m)	240 lb (109 kg)	So	McNair HS	Augusta, GA

Head coach

- John Chaney

Assistant coach(es)

Legend

- (C) Team captain
- (S) Suspended
- (I) Ineligible
- (W) Walk-on
- Injured
- Current redshirt

Roster

== Schedule and results ==
Date time, TV	Rank^{#}	Opponent^{#}	Result	Record	Site city, state
Regular Season
Nov 27, 1994*		vs. USC	W 65–54	1–0	The Pyramid; Memphis, Tennessee
Dec 2, 1994*		vs. No. 10 Cincinnati	L 41–60	1–1	Bojangles' Coliseum; Charlotte, North Carolina
Dec 3, 1994*		vs. South Carolina	W 49–44	2–1	Bojangles' Coliseum; Charlotte, North Carolina
Dec 20, 1994*		Texas Tech	W 67–64 ^{2OT}	3–1	McGonigle Hall; Philadelphia, Pennsylvania
Jan 3, 1995		St. Bonaventure	W 70–57	4–1 (1–0)	McGonigle Hall; Philadelphia, Pennsylvania
Jan 5, 1995*		vs. Marquette	W 69–57	5–1	Kiel Center; St. Louis, Missouri
Feb 19, 1995*		vs. Texas	L 54–70	14–8	Alamodome; San Antonio, Texas
Feb 28, 1995		vs. Saint Joseph's	L 64–73 ^{OT}	17–9 (10–6)	Alumni Memorial Fieldhouse; Philadelphia, Pennsylvania
Atlantic 10 Tournament
Mar 5, 1995*		vs. West Virginia; Quarterfinals	W 84–72	18–9	The Palestra; Philadelphia, Pennsylvania
Mar 6, 1995*		vs. Rutgers; Semifinals	W 47–42	19–9	The Palestra; Philadelphia, Pennsylvania
Mar 9, 1995*		at No. 8 UMass; Championship game	L 44–63	19–10	Mullins Center; Amherst, Massachusetts
NCAA Tournament
Mar 16, 1995*	(10 W)	vs. (7 W) Cincinnati; First Round	L 71–77	19–11	Jon M. Huntsman Center; Salt Lake City, Utah
*Non-conference game. ^{#}Rankings from AP Poll. (#) Tournament seedings in parentheses. W=West. All times are in Eastern Standard Time.
