= 1994–95 Murray State Racers men's basketball team =

American college basketball season

1994–95 Murray State Racers men's basketball

Ohio Valley tournament champions

NCAA tournament, first round
- Conference: Ohio Valley Conference
- Record: 21–9 (11–5 OVC)
- Head coach: Scott Edgar (4th season)
- Home arena: Racer Arena

1994–95 Ohio Valley Conference men's basketball standings
| | Conf. | | | | Overall |
| Team | W | | L | PCT | W | | L | PCT |
|---|---|---|---|---|---|---|---|---|
| Tennessee State | 11 | – | 5 | .688 | 17 | – | 10 | .630 |
| Murray State † | 11 | – | 5 | .688 | 21 | – | 9 | .700 |
| Morehead State | 10 | – | 6 | .625 | 15 | – | 12 | .556 |
| Tennessee Tech | 9 | – | 7 | .563 | 13 | – | 14 | .481 |
| Austin Peay | 8 | – | 8 | .500 | 13 | – | 16 | .448 |
| Southeast Missouri State | 7 | – | 9 | .438 | 13 | – | 14 | .481 |
| Eastern Kentucky | 6 | – | 10 | .375 | 9 | – | 19 | .321 |
| Middle Tennessee | 5 | – | 11 | .313 | 12 | – | 15 | .444 |
| UT Martin | 5 | – | 11 | .313 | 7 | – | 20 | .259 |
† 1995 OVC tournament winner Rankings from AP Poll

The 1994–95 Murray State Racers men's basketball team represented Murray State University during the 1994–95 NCAA Division I men's basketball season. The Racers, led by fourth-year head coach Scott Edgar, played their home games at Racer Arena in Murray, Kentucky as members of the Ohio Valley Conference. They finished the season 21–9, 11–5 in OVC play to finish second in the regular season standings. They defeated Eastern Kentucky to win the OVC tournament to advance to the NCAA tournament. As No. 15 seed in the Southeast region, the Racers were beaten by No. 2 seed and eventual Final Four participant North Carolina, 80–70.

== Roster ==
1994–95 Murray State Racers men's basketball team
| Players | Coaches |
|---|---|
| Pos. / # / Name / Height / Weight / Year / Previous school / Hometown; G / 5 / Marcus Brown / 6 ft 3 in (1.91 m) / — / Jr / West Memphis / West Memphis, Arkansas | Head coach: Scott Edgar (Pittsburgh–Johnstown); Assistant coach(es) Legend: (C) Team captain; (S) Suspended; (I) Ineligible; (W) Walk-on; Injured; Current redshirt |

== Schedule and results ==
| Date time, TV | Rank^{#} | Opponent^{#} | Result | Record | Site (attendance) city, state |
Regular season
| Nov 30, 1994* | | Campbellsville | W 138–88 | 1–0 | Racer Arena; Murray, Kentucky |
| Dec 2, 1994* | | vs. Troy | W 107–97 | 2–0 | Trask Coliseum; Wilmington, North Carolina |
| Dec 3, 1994* | | at UNC Wilmington | L 73–81 | 2–1 | Trask Coliseum; Wilmington, North Carolina |
| Dec 10, 1994* | | at No. 3 Arkansas | L 69–94 | 3–2 | Bud Walton Arena; Fayetteville, Arkansas |
| Feb 27, 1995 | | Tennessee-Martin | W 107–75 | 18–8 (11–5) | Racer Arena; Murray, Kentucky |
Ohio Valley Conference tournament
| Mar 2, 1995* | | vs. Middle Tennessee; Quarterfinals | W 75–67 | 19–8 | Nashville Municipal Auditorium; Nashville, Tennessee |
| Mar 3, 1995* | | vs. Eastern Kentucky; Semifinals | W 78–72 | 20–8 | Nashville Municipal Auditorium; Nashville, Tennessee |
| Mar 4, 1995* | | vs. Austin Peay; Championship game | W 92–84 | 21–8 | Nashville Municipal Auditorium; Nashville, Tennessee |
NCAA tournament
| Mar 17, 1995* | (15 SE) | vs. (2 SE) No. 4 North Carolina; First round | L 70–80 | 21–9 | Leon County Civic Center; Tallahassee, Florida |
*Non-conference game. ^{#}Rankings from AP Poll. (#) Tournament seedings in parentheses. SE=Southeast. All times are in Central Time.
