= 1995 Ohio Valley Conference men's basketball tournament =

- Classification: Division I
- Season: 1994–95
- Teams: 7
- Site: Nashville Municipal Auditorium; Nashville, Tennessee
- Champions: Murray State (7th title)
- Winning coach: Scott Edgar (2nd title)
- MVP: Marcus Brown (Murray State)

1994–95 Ohio Valley Conference men's basketball standings
	Conf.				Overall
Team	W		L	PCT	W		L	PCT
Tennessee State	11	–	5	.688	17	–	10	.630
Murray State †	11	–	5	.688	21	–	9	.700
Morehead State	10	–	6	.625	15	–	12	.556
Tennessee Tech	9	–	7	.563	13	–	14	.481
Austin Peay	8	–	8	.500	13	–	16	.448
Southeast Missouri State	7	–	9	.438	13	–	14	.481
Eastern Kentucky	6	–	10	.375	9	–	19	.321
Middle Tennessee	5	–	11	.313	12	–	15	.444
UT Martin	5	–	11	.313	7	–	20	.259
† 1995 OVC tournament winner Rankings from AP Poll

The 1995 Ohio Valley Conference men's basketball tournament was the final event of the 1994–95 season in the Ohio Valley Conference. The tournament was held March 2–4, 1995, at Nashville Municipal Auditorium in Nashville, Tennessee.

Murray State defeated Austin Peay in the championship game, 92–84, to win their 7th OVC men's basketball tournament.

The Racers received an automatic bid to the 1995 NCAA tournament as the No. 15 seed in the Southeast region.

== Format ==
Seven of the nine conference members participated in the tournament field. They were seeded based on regular season conference records, with the top seed (Tennessee State) receiving a bye to the semifinal round. The teams were re-seeded after the opening round. Southeast Missouri State and UT Martin did not participate.

== Bracket ==
Quarterfinals; Tuesday, March 2
4	Tennessee Tech	78
5	Austin Peay	83
(Pairings are reseeded after the first round)
3	Morehead State	74
6	Eastern Kentucky	85
2	Murray State	75
7	Middle Tennessee	67

Semifinals; Wednesday, March 3
1	Tennessee State	76
5	Austin Peay	81
6	Eastern Kentucky	72
2	Murray State	78

Championship; Thursday, March 4
5	Austin Peay	84
2	Murray State	92
