= 1994–95 Florida Gators men's basketball team =

American college basketball season

1994–95 Florida Gators men's basketball

NCAA tournament, First Round
- Conference: Southeastern Conference
- Record: 17–13 (8–8 SEC)
- Head coach: Lon Kruger (5th season)
- Assistant coaches: Robert McCullum (4th season); Ron Stewart; R. C. Buford (2nd season)
- Home arena: O'Connell Center

1994–95 Southeastern Conference men's basketball standings
	Conf.				Overall
Team	W		L	PCT	W		L	PCT
East Division
No. 2 Kentucky †	14	–	2	.875	28	–	5	.848
Georgia	9	–	7	.563	18	–	10	.643
Florida	8	–	8	.500	17	–	13	.567
Vanderbilt	6	–	10	.375	13	–	15	.464
South Carolina	5	–	11	.313	10	–	17	.370
Tennessee	4	–	12	.250	11	–	16	.407
West Division
No. 6 Arkansas	12	–	4	.750	32	–	7	.821
No. 18 Mississippi State	12	–	4	.750	22	–	8	.733
No. 20 Alabama	10	–	6	.625	23	–	10	.697
Auburn	7	–	9	.438	16	–	13	.552
LSU	6	–	10	.375	12	–	15	.444
Ole Miss	3	–	13	.188	8	–	19	.296
† 1995 SEC tournament winner Rankings from AP Poll

The 1994–95 Florida Gators men's basketball team represented the University of Florida as a member of the Southeastern Conference during the 1994–95 NCAA men's basketball season. Led by head coach Lon Kruger, the Gators reached the 1995 NCAA Tournament, and finished with an overall record of 17–13 (8–8 SEC).

== Roster ==
1994–95 Florida Gators men's basketball team
Players
Coaches

Pos.	#	Name	Height	Weight	Year	Hometown
F	3	Brian Thompson	6 ft 6 in (1.98 m)	218 lb (99 kg)	Jr	Atlanta, GA
G/F	5	Jason Anderson	6 ft 4 in (1.93 m)	195 lb (88 kg)	Jr	College Park, Georgia
G	10	Greg Williams	6 ft 3 in (1.91 m)	183 lb (83 kg)	So	Fairfax, Virginia
G	12	Dan Cross	6 ft 3 in (1.91 m)	193 lb (88 kg)	Sr	Carbondale, Illinois
F	33	Tony Mickens	6 ft 5 in (1.96 m)	220 lb (100 kg)	Sr	Memphis, Tennessee
C	35	Dametri Hill	6 ft 7 in (2.01 m)	286 lb (130 kg)	Jr	St. Petersburg, Florida
F/C	40	Svein Dyrkolbotn	6 ft 8 in (2.03 m)	244 lb (111 kg)	Sr	Bergen, Norway
F	55	Andrew DeClercq	6 ft 10 in (2.08 m)	230 lb (104 kg)	Jr	Clearwater, Florida
G		Clayton Bates	6 ft 2 in (1.88 m)	190 lb (86 kg)	Jr	Gainesville, Florida

Head coach

- Lon Kruger (Kansas State)

Assistant coach(es)

Legend

- (C) Team captain
- (S) Suspended
- (I) Ineligible
- (W) Walk-on
- Injured
- Current redshirt

== Schedule and results ==
Date time, TV	Rank^{#}	Opponent^{#}	Result	Record	Site city, state
Regular season
Nov 25, 1994*	No. 10	Stetson	W 73–64	1–0	O'Connell Center; Gainesville, Florida
Nov 29, 1994*	No. 8	vs. Boston College	W 91–65	2–0	Palace of Auburn Hills; Auburn Hills, Michigan
Dec 3, 1994*	No. 6	vs. No. 21 Wake Forest	W 81–70	3–0	Greensboro Coliseum; Greensboro, North Carolina
Dec 7, 1994*	No. 6	at No. 4 Kansas	L 63–69	3–1	Allen Fieldhouse; Lawrence, Kansas
Dec 10, 1994*	No. 8	Texas	W 91–73	4–1	O'Connell Center; Gainesville, Florida
Dec 17, 1994*	No. 8	vs. Florida State	W 71–65 ^{2OT}	5–1	Orlando Arena; Orlando, Florida
Dec 21, 1994*	No. 8	Jacksonville	L 67–68	5–2	O'Connell Center; Gainesville, Florida
Dec 30, 1994*	No. 13	Saint Francis (PA)	W 87–72	6–2	O'Connell Center; Gainesville, Florida
Jan 3, 1995	No. 13	at LSU	L 66–70	6–3 (0–1)	Maravich Assembly Center; Baton Rouge, Louisiana
Jan 7, 1995	No. 13	Vanderbilt	W 72–62	7–3 (1–1)	O'Connell Center; Gainesville, Florida
Jan 10, 1995	No. 15	No. 7 Kentucky	L 67–83	7–4 (1–2)	O'Connell Center; Gainesville, Florida
Jan 14, 1995*	No. 15	Villanova	L 70–72	7–5	O'Connell Center; Gainesville, Florida
Jan 18, 1995	No. 24	South Carolina	W 71–59	8–5 (2–2)	Carolina Coliseum; Columbia, South Carolina
Jan 22, 1995	No. 24	at Tennessee	W 62–47	9–5 (3–2)	Thompson-Boling Arena; Knoxville, Tennessee
Jan 25, 1995	No. 23	at Auburn	L 71–77	9–6 (3–3)	Memorial Coliseum; Auburn, Alabama
Jan 28, 1995	No. 23	Ole Miss	W 72–57	10–6 (4–3)	O'Connell Center; Gainesville, Florida
Feb 1, 1995	No. 25	at Mississippi State	L 47–70	10–7 (4–4)	Humphrey Coliseum; Starkville, Mississippi
Feb 7, 1995		at Georgia	W 82–66	11–7 (5–4)	Stegeman Coliseum; Athens, Georgia
Feb 11, 1995		South Carolina	W 71–56	12–7 (6–4)	O'Connell Center; Gainesville, Florida
Feb 15, 1995; 8:00 p.m., JPS		Tennessee	W 70–48	13–7 (7–4)	O'Connell Center; Gainesville, Florida
Feb 18, 1995; 3:00 p.m., JPS		at No. 4 Kentucky	L 77–87	13–8 (7–5)	Rupp Arena; Lexington, Kentucky
Feb 20, 1995*		at Florida State	W 75–62	14–8	Tallahassee-Leon County Civic Center; Tallahassee, Florida
Feb 22, 1995		Georgia	L 85–101	14–9 (7–6)	O'Connell Center; Gainesville, Florida
Feb 25, 1995		No. 20 Alabama	L 66–69	14–10 (7–7)	O'Connell Center; Gainesville, Florida
Feb 28, 1995		No. 7 Arkansas	L 85–94	14–11 (7–8)	O'Connell Center; Gainesville, Florida
Mar 5, 1995		at Vanderbilt	W 69–58	15–11 (8–8)	Memorial Gymnasium; Nashville, Tennessee
SEC Tournament
Mar 9, 1995*; JPS		vs. Ole Miss; First round	W 63–59	16–11	Georgia Dome; Atlanta, Georgia
Mar 10, 1995*; JPS		vs. No. 15 Mississippi State; Quarterfinals	W 80–64	17–11	Georgia Dome; Atlanta, Georgia
Mar 11, 1995*; JPS		vs. No. 3 Kentucky; Semifinals	L 72–86	17–12	Georgia Dome; Atlanta, Georgia
NCAA Tournament
Mar 17, 1995*; CBS	(10 SE)	vs. (7 SE) No. 24 Iowa State; First round	L 61–64	17–13	Tallahassee-Leon County Civic Center; Tallahassee, Florida
*Non-conference game. ^{#}Rankings from AP Poll. (#) Tournament seedings in parentheses. SE=Southeast.
