= 1994–95 Saint Peter's Peacocks men's basketball team =

American college basketball season

1994–95 Saint Peter's Peacocks men's basketball
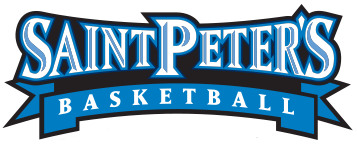

MAAC tournament champions

NCAA tournament, first round
- Conference: Metro Atlantic Athletic Conference
- Record: 19–11 (10–4 MAAC)
- Head coach: Ted Fiore (9th season)
- Home arena: Yanitelli Center

1994–95 MAAC men's basketball standings
	Conf.				Overall
Team	W		L	PCT	W		L	PCT
Manhattan	12	–	2	.857	26	–	5	.839
Canisius	10	–	4	.714	21	–	14	.600
Saint Peter's †	10	–	4	.714	19	–	11	.633
Fairfield	6	–	8	.429	13	–	15	.464
Iona	6	–	8	.429	10	–	17	.370
Siena	5	–	9	.357	8	–	19	.296
Loyola (MD)	5	–	9	.357	9	–	18	.333
Niagara	2	–	12	.143	5	–	25	.167
† 1995 MAAC tournament winner Rankings from AP Poll

The 1994–95 Saint Peter's Peacocks men's basketball team represented Saint Peter's College during the 1994–95 NCAA Division I men's basketball season. The Peacocks, led by ninth-year head coach Ted Fiore, played their home games at the Yanitelli Center and were members of the Metro Atlantic Athletic Conference. They finished the season 19–11, 10–4 in MAAC play to finish in third place. They defeated Siena, Canisius, and Manhattan to win the MAAC tournament. As a result, they received the conference's automatic bid to the NCAA tournament – as the No. 15 seed in the East region where they lost to UMass in the first round.

== Roster ==
1994–95 Saint Peter's Peacocks men's basketball team
Players	Coaches
Pos. / # / Name / Height / Weight / Year / Previous school / Hometown; F / / Luis Arrosa / 6 ft 8 in (2.03 m) / — / Jr	Head coach: Ted Fiore; Assistant coach(es) Legend: (C) Team captain; (S) Suspended; (I) Ineligible; (W) Walk-on; Injured; Current redshirt

== Schedule and results ==
Date time, TV	Rank^{#}	Opponent^{#}	Result	Record	Site (attendance) city, state
Regular season
Jan 3, 1995*		North Carolina A&T	W 66–52	5–5	Yanitelli Center; Jersey City, New Jersey
MAAC tournament
Mar 4, 1995*		vs. Siena; Quarterfinals	W 53–45	17–10	Knickerbocker Arena; Albany, New York
Mar 5, 1995*		vs. Canisius; Semifinals	W 60–56	18–10	Knickerbocker Arena; Albany, New York
Mar 6, 1995*		vs. Manhattan; Championship game	W 80–78 ^{OT}	19–10	Knickerbocker Arena; Albany, New York
NCAA tournament
Mar 17, 1995*	(15 E)	vs. (2 E) No. 7 UMass; First round	L 51–68	19–11	Knickerbocker Arena (15,100); Albany, New York
*Non-conference game. ^{#}Rankings from AP Poll. (#) Tournament seedings in parentheses. E=East. All times are in Eastern Time.
