= Reggie Jackson (basketball, born 1973) =

American basketball player

Personal information
- Born: December 10, 1973 (age 52) Baker, Louisiana, U.S.
- Listed height: 6 ft 6 in (1.98 m)
- Listed weight: 240 lb (109 kg)

Career information
- High school: Baker (Baker, Louisiana)
- College: Nicholls State (1991–1995)
- NBA draft: 1995: undrafted
- Playing career: 1995–2007
- Position: Power forward

Career history
- 1995–1997: Rockford Lightning
- 1997: Dinamica Gorizia
- 1997–1998: La Crosse Bobcats
- 1998–1999: Cáceres CB
- 2006–2007: Novi Grad

Career highlights
- CBA All-Rookie First Team (1996); Southland Player of the Year (1995); 4x First-team All-Southland (1992–1995); Southland Freshman of the Year (1992)

Reginald Jerod Jackson (born December 10, 1973) is an American former basketball player. He is best known for his college career at Nicholls State University in Thibodaux, Louisiana, where he scored over 2,000 points and recorded over 1,000 rebounds and was named the Southland Conference Player of the Year as a senior.

== College career ==
Jackson, a 6'6" power forward from Baker High School in Baker, Louisiana, was lightly recruited out of high school as he was considered undersized for his position. He ultimately went to Nicholls State to play for coach Rickey Broussard.

At Nicholls State, Jackson became one of the Colonels' all-time greats. As a freshman in the 1991–92 season, Jackson averaged 16.4 points per game and led the Southland Conference (SLC) in rebounding at 11.1 per game. He was named first team all-conference and the league's Freshman of the Year. As a sophomore, Jackson increased those averages to 20.5 points and 12.5 rebounds per game and finished third in the country in rebounding.

While his first two seasons saw Jackson performing well individually, Nicholls State had a pedestrian 29–25 record during those years. In his final two seasons, Jackson led the Colonels to more team success. As a junior in 1993–94, Jackson averaged 18.6 points and 12.0 rebounds and the Colonels to a 19–9 mark and a 12–6 SLC record. As a senior, he led an experienced Colonels team to Southland regular-season and tournament titles. Jackson was named first team All-SLC for the fourth consecutive season (only the third player in conference history to achieve this) and was named Conference Player of the Year.

For his career, Reggie Jackson tallied 2,124 points (19.3 per game) and 1,271 rebounds (11.6). He finished his career as the leading rebounder in school history, and the school's second leading scorer. He also left Nicholls State as the school's career field goal percentage leader (58.1%).

== Professional career ==
Despite his impressive production, Jackson was not drafted in the 1995 NBA draft. He was selected in the first round (fourth pick overall) of the 1995 Continental Basketball Association (CBA) draft by the Rockford Lightning. Jackson played two seasons for the Lightning, and was named to the 1996 CBA All-Rookie First Team after averaging 14.4 points and 8.5 rebounds in his rookie season. Following a brief stint in Italy, Jackson returned to the CBA, where he played the 1997–98 season with the La Crosse Catbirds. For his three-year CBA career, Jackson averaged 13 points and 8.3 rebounds per game. The next season, Jackson played for Cáceres CB in Spain's Liga ACB. He has also played for Novi Grad in Bosnia and Herzegovina.

== See also ==
- List of NCAA Division I men's basketball players with 2000 points and 1000 rebounds
