= 1994–95 Manhattan Jaspers basketball team =

American college basketball season

1994–95 Manhattan Jaspers basketball

MAAC regular-season champions

NCAA tournament, second round
- Conference: Metro Atlantic Athletic Conference
- Record: 26–5 (12–2 MAAC)
- Head coach: Fran Fraschilla (3rd season)
- Home arena: Draddy Gymnasium

1994–95 MAAC men's basketball standings
	Conf.				Overall
Team	W		L	PCT	W		L	PCT
Manhattan	12	–	2	.857	26	–	5	.839
Canisius	10	–	4	.714	21	–	14	.600
Saint Peter's †	10	–	4	.714	19	–	11	.633
Fairfield	6	–	8	.429	13	–	15	.464
Iona	6	–	8	.429	10	–	17	.370
Siena	5	–	9	.357	8	–	19	.296
Loyola (MD)	5	–	9	.357	9	–	18	.333
Niagara	2	–	12	.143	5	–	25	.167
† 1995 MAAC tournament winner Rankings from AP Poll

The 1994–95 Manhattan Jaspers basketball team represented Manhattan College during the 1994–95 NCAA Division I men's basketball season. The Jaspers, led by third-year head coach Fran Fraschilla, played their home games at Draddy Gymnasium and were members of the Metro Atlantic Athletic Conference. They finished the season 26–5, 12–2 in MAAC play to finish in first place. They lost the championship game of the MAAC tournament, but secured an at-large bid to the NCAA tournament. Playing as the No. 13 seed in the Southeast region, the Jaspers upset No. 4 seed Oklahoma in the opening round. Manhattan was beaten by No. 5 seed Arizona State in the round of 32.

== Roster ==
1994–95 Manhattan Jaspers men's basketball team
Players
Coaches

Pos.	#	Name	Height	Weight	Year	Hometown
G		Ted Ellis	6 ft 2 in (1.88 m)	—	Jr
C		Jamal Marshall	6 ft 10 in (2.08 m)	—	Sr

Head coach

- Fran Fraschilla

Assistant coach(es)

Legend

- (C) Team captain
- (S) Suspended
- (I) Ineligible
- (W) Walk-on
- Injured
- Current redshirt

== Schedule and results ==
Date time, TV	Rank^{#}	Opponent^{#}	Result	Record	Site (attendance) city, state
Non-conference regular season
Nov 28, 1994*		Wagner	W 103–64	1–0	Draddy Gymnasium (1,250); New York, New York
Dec 3, 1994*		Fordham	W 88–48	2–0	Draddy Gymnasium (2,751); New York, New York
Dec 5, 1994*		at Rider	W 73–68	3–0	Alumni Gymnasium (1,151); Lawrenceville, New Jersey
Dec 7, 1994*		Marist	W 70–52	4–0	Draddy Gymnasium (1,147); New York, New York
Dec 10, 1994*		at Monmouth	W 66–59	5–0	Boylan Gymnasium (1,927); West Long Branch, New Jersey
Dec 17, 1994*		Eastern Michigan	W 73–71	6–0	Draddy Gymnasium (2,257); New York, New York
Dec 20, 1994*		at Florida International	W 70–57	7–0	U.S. Century Bank Arena (516); Miami, Florida
Dec 22, 1994*		Wright State	W 91–46	8–0	Draddy Gymnasium (1,279); New York, New York
Dec 27, 1994*		vs. No. 25 St. John's; ECAC Holiday Festival	L 70–81	8–1	Madison Square Garden (19,524); New York, New York
Dec 28, 1994*		vs. Colgate; ECAC Holiday Festival	W 54–51	9–1	Madison Square Garden (15,812); New York, New York
MAAC Regular season
Jan 4, 1995		at Iona	L 66–73	9–2 (0–1)	Hynes Athletic Center (2,495); New Rochelle, New York
Jan 7, 1995*		Rutgers	W 92–90	10–2	Draddy Gymnasium (1,909); New York, New York
Jan 12, 1995*		at Hofstra	W 78–57	11–2	Physical Fitness Center (1,763); Hempstead, New York
Jan 14, 1995		Niagara	W 85–54	12–2 (1–1)	Draddy Gymnasium (1,752); New York, New York
Jan 17, 1995		at Saint Peter's	W 76–55	13–2 (2–1)	Yanitelli Center (1,450); Jersey City, New Jersey
Jan 21, 1995		at Siena	W 66–61	14–2 (3–1)	Knickerbocker Arena (5,592); Albany, New York
Jan 23, 1995		Loyola (MD)	W 85–56	15–2 (4–1)	Draddy Gymnasium (1,790); New York, New York
Jan 28, 1995		Fairfield	W 62–58	16–2 (5–1)	Draddy Gymnasium (2,387); New York, New York
Feb 3, 1995		at Canisius	W 72–60	17–2 (6–1)	Buffalo Memorial Auditorium (4,570); Buffalo, New York
Feb 5, 1995		at Niagara	W 81–53	18–2 (7–1)	Niagara Falls Convention Center (974); Niagara Falls, New York
Feb 8, 1995		at Loyola (MD)	W 91–83	19–2 (8–1)	Reitz Arena (1,007); Baltimore, Maryland
Feb 11, 1995		Iona	W 84–67	20–2 (9–1)	Draddy Gymnasium (2,831); New York, New York
Feb 14, 1995		Saint Peter's	W 73–50	21–2 (10–1)	Draddy Gymnasium (2,345); New York, New York
Feb 18, 1995		Siena	W 67–54	22–2 (11–1)	Draddy Gymnasium (10,626); New York, New York
Feb 20, 1995		at Fairfield	W 65–56	19–2 (8–1)	Alumni Hall (Fairfield University) (2,395); Fairfield, Connecticut
Feb 25, 1995		Canisius	L 58–65	23–3 (12–2)	Draddy Gymnasium (3,286); New York, New York
MAAC tournament
Mar 4, 1995*	(1)	vs. (8) Niagara; Quarterfinals	W 83–60	24–3	Knickerbocker Arena (3,257); Albany, New York
Mar 5, 1995*	(1)	vs. (4) Fairfield; Semifinals	W 82–69	25–3	Knickerbocker Arena (3,201); Albany, New York
Mar 6, 1995*	(1)	vs. (3) Saint Peter's; Championship game	L 78–80 ^{OT}	25–4	Knickerbocker Arena (4,863); Albany, New York
NCAA tournament
Mar 16, 1995*	(13 SE)	vs. (4 SE) No. 17 Oklahoma; First Round	W 77–67	26–4	Pyramid Arena (19,120); Memphis, Tennessee
Mar 18, 1995*	(13 SE)	vs. (5 SE) No. 16 Arizona State; Second Round	L 54–64	26–5	Pyramid Arena (19,120); Memphis, Tennessee
*Non-conference game. ^{#}Rankings from AP Poll. (#) Tournament seedings in parentheses. SE=Southeast. All times are in Eastern Time.
