= 1995 MAAC men's basketball tournament =

- Classification: Division I
- Season: 1994–95
- Teams: 8
- Site: Knickerbocker Arena; Albany, New York
- Champions: Saint Peter's (2nd title)
- Winning coach: Ted Fiore (2nd title)
- MVP: Randy Holmes (Saint Peter's)

1994–95 MAAC men's basketball standings
	Conf.				Overall
Team	W		L	PCT	W		L	PCT
Manhattan	12	–	2	.857	26	–	5	.839
Canisius	10	–	4	.714	21	–	14	.600
Saint Peter's †	10	–	4	.714	19	–	11	.633
Fairfield	6	–	8	.429	13	–	15	.464
Iona	6	–	8	.429	10	–	17	.370
Siena	5	–	9	.357	8	–	19	.296
Loyola (MD)	5	–	9	.357	9	–	18	.333
Niagara	2	–	12	.143	5	–	25	.167
† 1995 MAAC tournament winner Rankings from AP Poll

The 1995 MAAC men's basketball tournament was held March 4–6, 1995 at Knickerbocker Arena in Albany, New York.

Third-seeded Saint Peter's defeated Manhattan in the championship game, 80–78, to win their second MAAC men's basketball tournament.

The Peacocks received an automatic bid to the 1995 NCAA tournament.

== Format ==
All eight of the conference's members participated in the tournament field. They were seeded based on regular season conference records.

== Bracket ==
Quarterfinals; Saturday, March 4
1	Manhattan	83
8	Niagara	60
4	Fairfield	81
5	Iona	74^{OT}
3	Saint Peter's	53
6	Siena	45
2	Canisius	77
7	Loyola (MD)	64

Semifinals; Sunday, March 5
1	Manhattan	82
4	Fairfield	69
3	Saint Peter's	60
2	Canisius	56

Championship; Monday, March 6
1	Manhattan	78^{OT}
3	Saint Peter's	80
