= 1995 Atlantic 10 men's basketball tournament =

- Classification: Division I
- Season: 1994–95
- Teams: 9
- Site: The Palestra (First 3 rounds); Philadelphia and Mullins Center (Championship); Amherst, Massachusetts
- Champions: UMass (4th title)
- Winning coach: John Calipari (4th title)
- MVP: Lou Roe (UMass)

1994–95 Atlantic 10 men's basketball standings
	Conf.				Overall
Team	W		L	PCT	W		L	PCT
No. 7 UMass †	13	–	3	.813	29	–	5	.853
Temple	10	–	6	.625	19	–	11	.633
George Washington	10	–	6	.625	18	–	14	.563
Saint Joseph's	9	–	7	.563	17	–	12	.586
St. Bonaventure	9	–	7	.563	18	–	13	.581
West Virginia	7	–	9	.438	13	–	13	.500
Rutgers	7	–	9	.438	13	–	15	.464
Duquesne	5	–	11	.313	10	–	18	.357
Rhode Island	2	–	14	.125	7	–	20	.259
† 1995 Atlantic 10 Tournament winner Rankings from AP Poll

The 1995 Atlantic 10 men's basketball tournament was played March 4–6 and 9, 1995. The first three rounds were played at the Palestra in Philadelphia, Pennsylvania, while the final was played at the Mullins Center in Amherst, Massachusetts. The winner was named champion of the Atlantic 10 Conference and received an automatic bid to the 1995 NCAA Men's Division I Basketball Tournament. The University of Massachusetts won the tournament for the fourth year in a row. Temple also received a bid to the NCAA Tournament. Lou Roe of Massachusetts was named the tournament's Most Outstanding Player, making the All-Championship Team for the fourth consecutive year. Future NBA players Rick Brunson (Temple) and Marcus Camby (Massachusetts) were among those also named to the All-Championship Team.

== Bracket ==
First round Saturday, March 4 Palestra, Philadelphia, PA
8	Duquesne	82
9	Rhode Island	69

Quarterfinals; Sunday, March 5 Palestra
1	#8 UMass	79
8	Duquesne	53
4	Saint Joseph's	84
5	St. Bonaventure	78^{2OT}
2	George Washington	73
7	Rutgers	80
3	Temple	84
6	West Virginia	72

Semifinals; Monday, March 6 Palestra
1	#8 UMass	68
4	Saint Joseph's	57
7	Rutgers	42
3	Temple	47

Final; Thursday, March 9 Mullins Center, Amherst, MA
1	#8 UMass	63
3	Temple	44
