= 1994–95 Arkansas Razorbacks men's basketball team =

American college basketball season

1994–95 Arkansas Razorbacks men's basketball

NCAA Tournament, Runner-up NCAA tournament Midwest Regional champions SEC West Division champions

National Championship Game, L 78–89 vs. UCLA
- Conference: Southeastern Conference
- West

Ranking
- Coaches: No. 2
- AP: No. 6
- Record: 32–7 (12–4 SEC)
- Head coach: Nolan Richardson (10th season)
- Assistant coaches: Nolan Richardson III; Mike Anderson; Brad Dunn
- Home arena: Bud Walton Arena

1994–95 Southeastern Conference men's basketball standings
	Conf.				Overall
Team	W		L	PCT	W		L	PCT
East Division
No. 2 Kentucky †	14	–	2	.875	28	–	5	.848
Georgia	9	–	7	.563	18	–	10	.643
Florida	8	–	8	.500	17	–	13	.567
Vanderbilt	6	–	10	.375	13	–	15	.464
South Carolina	5	–	11	.313	10	–	17	.370
Tennessee	4	–	12	.250	11	–	16	.407
West Division
No. 6 Arkansas	12	–	4	.750	32	–	7	.821
No. 18 Mississippi State	12	–	4	.750	22	–	8	.733
No. 20 Alabama	10	–	6	.625	23	–	10	.697
Auburn	7	–	9	.438	16	–	13	.552
LSU	6	–	10	.375	12	–	15	.444
Ole Miss	3	–	13	.188	8	–	19	.296
† 1995 SEC tournament winner Rankings from AP Poll

The 1994–95 Arkansas Razorbacks men's basketball team represented the University of Arkansas as a member of the Southeastern Conference during the 1994–95 NCAA Division I men's basketball season. The team was led by head coach Nolan Richardson, and played its home games at the Bud Walton Arena in Fayetteville, Arkansas.

The Razorbacks were the national runners-up in the 1995 NCAA tournament, losing to UCLA in the championship game, 89–78.

== Roster ==
1994–95 Arkansas Razorbacks men's basketball team
Players
Coaches

Pos.	#	Name	Height	Weight	Year	Hometown
G	3	Alex Dillard	6 ft 1 in (1.85 m)	175 lb (79 kg)	Sr	Bessemer, AL
G	12	Clint McDaniel	6 ft 4 in (1.93 m)	190 lb (86 kg)	Sr	Tulsa, OK
G	13	John Engskov	6 ft 3 in (1.91 m)	180 lb (82 kg)	So	Berryville, AR
G	14	Corey Beck	6 ft 2 in (1.88 m)	210 lb (95 kg)	Sr	Memphis, TN
C	15	Dwight Stewart	6 ft 9 in (2.06 m)	270 lb (122 kg)	Sr	Memphis, TN
G	22	Davor Rimac	6 ft 7 in (2.01 m)	205 lb (93 kg)	Sr	Zagreb, Croatia
F	24	Ray Biggers	6 ft 8 in (2.03 m)	215 lb (98 kg)	Sr	Houston, TX
F	30	Scotty Thurman	6 ft 6 in (1.98 m)	195 lb (88 kg)	Jr	Ruston, LA
C	33	Lee Wilson	6 ft 11 in (2.11 m)	235 lb (107 kg)	So	Waco, TX
F	34	Corliss Williamson	6 ft 7 in (2.01 m)	245 lb (111 kg)	Jr	Russellville, AR
G	35	Reggie Merritt	6 ft 1 in (1.85 m)	170 lb (77 kg)	Jr	Little Rock, AR
F	40	Elmer Martin	6 ft 8 in (2.03 m)	225 lb (102 kg)	Sr	Memphis, TN
C	44	Darnell Robinson	6 ft 11 in (2.11 m)	245 lb (111 kg)	So	Oakland, CA

Head coach

- Nolan Richardson (UTEP)

Assistant coach(es)

- Mike Anderson (Tulsa)
- Nolan Richardson III (Langston)
- Brad Dunn

Legend

- (C) Team captain
- (S) Suspended
- (I) Ineligible
- (W) Walk-on
- Injured
- Current redshirt

Roster

== Schedule and results ==
Date time, TV	Rank^{#}	Opponent^{#}	Result	Record	Site city, state
Regular Season
Nov 25, 1994*	No. 1	No. 3 UMass; Starter Tip-off Classic	L 80–104	0–1	Springfield Civic Center (8,999); Springfield, MA
Nov 27, 1994*	No. 1	vs. No. 14 Georgetown	W 97–79	1–1	Pyramid Arena; Memphis, TN
Nov 30, 1994*	No. 4	Jackson State	W 103–87	2–1	Bud Walton Arena; Fayetteville, AR
Dec 3, 1994*	No. 4	at Missouri	W 94–71	3–1	Hearnes Center; Columbia, MO
Dec 6, 1994*	No. 3	Centenary	W 121–94	4–1	Bud Walton Arena; Fayetteville, AR
Dec 8, 1994*	No. 3	at SMU	W 78–66	5–1	Moody Coliseum; Dallas, TX
Dec 10, 1994*	No. 3	Murray State	W 94–69	6–1	Bud Walton Arena; Fayetteville, AR
Dec 21, 1994*	No. 3	Florida A&M	W 97–57	7–1	Bud Walton Arena; Fayetteville, AR
Dec 23, 1994*	No. 3	Tulsa	W 82–63	8–1	Bud Walton Arena; Fayetteville, AR
Dec 28, 1994*	No. 3	vs. Oklahoma; Kraft Rainbow Classic	W 86–84	9–1	Stan Sheriff Center; Honolulu, HI
Dec 29, 1994*	No. 3	vs. No. 20 Cincinnati; Kraft Rainbow Classic	W 84–75	10–1	Stan Sheriff Center; Honolulu, HI
Dec 30, 1994*	No. 3	vs. Iowa; Kraft Rainbow Classic	W 101–92	11–1	Stan Sheriff Center; Honolulu, HI
Jan 4, 1995	No. 3	at Ole Miss	L 71–76	11–2 (0–1)	Tad Smith Coliseum; Oxford, MS
Jan 7, 1995	No. 3	Tennessee	W 97–79	12–2 (1–1)	Bud Walton Arena; Fayetteville, AR
Jan 11, 1995	No. 5	Mississippi State	W 79–74	13–2 (2–1)	Bud Walton Arena; Fayetteville, AR
Jan 14, 1995	No. 5	at Auburn	L 90–104	13–3 (2–2)	Beard–Eaves–Memorial Coliseum; Auburn, AL
Jan 18, 1995	No. 9	Georgia	W 84–82	14–3 (3–2)	Bud Walton Arena; Fayetteville, AR
Jan 21, 1995	No. 9	at South Carolina	W 88–73	15–3 (4–2)	Carolina Coliseum; Columbia, SC
Jan 24, 1995	No. 9	Alabama	L 70–88	15–4 (4–3)	Bud Walton Arena; Fayetteville, AR
Jan 29, 1995	No. 9	No. 5 Kentucky	W 94–92	16–4 (5–3)	Bud Walton Arena; Fayetteville, AR
Jan 31, 1995	No. 8	LSU	W 105–81	17–4 (6–3)	Bud Walton Arena; Fayetteville, AR
Feb 4, 1995	No. 8	at Mississippi State	L 62–83	17–5 (6–4)	Humphrey Coliseum; Starkville, MS
Feb 9, 1995*	No. 12	Memphis	W 88–87	18–5	Bud Walton Arena; Fayetteville, AR
Feb 11, 1995; 2:00 p m., JPS	No. 12	at Vanderbilt	W 97–94	19–5 (7–4)	Memorial Coliseum; Nashville, TN
Feb 15, 1995; 7:00 p.m., JPS	No. 10	at No. 18 Alabama	W 86–80	20–5 (8–4)	Coleman Coliseum; Tuscaloosa, AL
Feb 18, 1995; 2:00 p.m., JPS	No. 10	Ole Miss	W 85–70	21–5 (9–4)	Bud Walton Arena; Fayetteville, AR
Feb 22, 1995	No. 8	at LSU	W 92–90	22–5 (10–4)	Maravich Assembly Center; Baton Rouge, LA
Feb 25, 1995	No. 8	Montevallo	W 122–64	23–5	Bud Walton Arena; Fayetteville, AR
Feb 28, 1995	No. 7	at Florida	W 94–85	24–5 (11–4)	Stephen C. O'Connell Center; Gainesville, FL
Mar 4, 1995	No. 7	Auburn	W 68–66	25–5 (12–4)	Bud Walton Arena; Fayetteville, AR
SEC Tournament
Mar 10, 1995*; JP Sports	(W1) No. 5	vs. (E4) Vanderbilt; Quarterfinals	W 73–72	26–5	Georgia Dome; Atlanta, GA
Mar 11, 1995*; JP Sports	(W1) No. 5	vs. (W3) No. 20 Alabama; Semifinals	W 69–58	27–5	Georgia Dome; Atlanta, GA
Mar 12, 1995*; JP Sports/ESPN	(W1) No. 5	vs. (E1) No. 3 Kentucky; Championship	L 93–95 ^{OT}	27–6	Georgia Dome; Atlanta, GA
NCAA Tournament
Mar 17, 1995*; CBS	(2 MW) No. 6	vs. (15 MW) Texas Southern; First Round	W 79–78	28–6	Frank Erwin Center; Austin, TX
Mar 19, 1995*; CBS	(2 MW) No. 6	vs. (7 MW) No. 25 Syracuse; Second Round	W 96–94 ^{OT}	29–6	Frank Erwin Center; Austin, TX
Mar 24, 1995*; CBS	(2 MW) No. 6	vs. (6 MW) Memphis; Sweet Sixteen	W 96–91 ^{OT}	30–6	Kemper Arena; Kansas City, MO
Mar 26, 1995*; CBS	(2 MW) No. 6	vs. (4 MW) No. 13 Virginia; Elite Eight	W 68–61	31–6	Kemper Arena; Kansas City, MO
Apr 1, 1995*; CBS	(2 MW) No. 6	vs. (2 SE) No. 4 North Carolina; Final Four	W 75–68	32–6	Kingdome; Seattle, WA
Apr 3, 1995*; CBS	(2 MW) No. 6	vs. (1 W) No. 1 UCLA; National Championship	L 78–89	32–7	Kingdome; Seattle, WA
*Non-conference game. ^{#}Rankings from AP Poll. (#) Tournament seedings in parentheses. MW=Midwest.

== Awards and honors ==
- Corliss Williamson, SEC Men's Basketball Player of the Year
- Corliss Williamson, Second Team, 1995 NCAA Men's Basketball All-Americans
- Corliss Williamson, 1st team All-SEC
- Scotty Thurman, AP Honorable Mention, 1995 NCAA Men's Basketball All-Americans
- Scotty Thurman, 1st team All-SEC

== Team players drafted into the NBA ==
Year	Round	Pick	Player	NBA Team
1995	1	13	Corliss Williamson	Sacramento Kings
1996	2	58	Darnell Robinson	Dallas Mavericks
