= 1994–95 Alabama Crimson Tide men's basketball team =

American college basketball season

1994–95 Alabama Crimson Tide men's basketball

NCAA tournament, Second round
- Conference: Southeastern Conference

Ranking
- Coaches: No. 21
- AP: No. 20
- Record: 23–10 (10–6 SEC)
- Head coach: David Hobbs (3rd season)
- Home arena: Coleman Coliseum

1994–95 Southeastern Conference men's basketball standings
	Conf.				Overall
Team	W		L	PCT	W		L	PCT
East Division
No. 2 Kentucky †	14	–	2	.875	28	–	5	.848
Georgia	9	–	7	.563	18	–	10	.643
Florida	8	–	8	.500	17	–	13	.567
Vanderbilt	6	–	10	.375	13	–	15	.464
South Carolina	5	–	11	.313	10	–	17	.370
Tennessee	4	–	12	.250	11	–	16	.407
West Division
No. 6 Arkansas	12	–	4	.750	32	–	7	.821
No. 18 Mississippi State	12	–	4	.750	22	–	8	.733
No. 20 Alabama	10	–	6	.625	23	–	10	.697
Auburn	7	–	9	.438	16	–	13	.552
LSU	6	–	10	.375	12	–	15	.444
Ole Miss	3	–	13	.188	8	–	19	.296
† 1995 SEC tournament winner Rankings from AP Poll

The 1994–95 Alabama Crimson Tide men's basketball team represented the University of Alabama in the 1994-95 NCAA Division I men's basketball season. The team's head coach was David Hobbs, who was in his third season at Alabama. The team played their home games at Coleman Coliseum in Tuscaloosa, Alabama. They finished the season with a record of 23–10, with a conference record of 10–6, good enough for third place in the SEC Western Division.

The only key loss from the prior season was James "Hollywood" Robinson to the NBA. Senior forwards Jason Caffey and Jamal Faulkner and sophomores Antonio McDyess and Eric Washington were the hub of the team.

The Tide reached the semifinal of the 1995 SEC men's basketball tournament final, but lost to Arkansas. The Tide earned an at-large bid to the 1995 NCAA tournament, defeating Penn in the first round and losing to eventual Final Four participant Oklahoma State.

== Roster ==
1994–95 Alabama Crimson Tide men's basketball team
Players
Coaches

Pos.	#	Name	Height	Weight	Year	Previous school	Hometown
F	35	Jason Caffey	6 ft 8 in (2.03 m)	—	Sr	Davidson High School	Mobile, Alabama
C	51	Cedric Moore	6 ft 9 in (2.06 m)	—	Sr	Woodlawn High School	Birmingham, Alabama
F	30	Jamal Faulkner	6 ft 7 in (2.01 m)	—	Sr	Christ the King HS/Arizona St.	Brooklyn, New York
C	24	Antonio McDyess	6 ft 9 in (2.06 m)	—	So	Quitman High School	Quitman, Mississippi
C	50	Roy Rogers	6 ft 10 in (2.08 m)	—	Jr	Linden High School	Linden, Alabama
G	15	Marvin Orange	6 ft 0 in (1.83 m)	—	Jr	Irmo High School	Irmo, South Carolina
G	22	Bryan Passink	6 ft 3 in (1.91 m)	—	Jr	Benedictine Military School	Savannah, Georgia
G	14	Eric Washington	6 ft 4 in (1.93 m)	—	So	Pearl High School	Pearl, Mississippi
G	25	Artie Griffin	6 ft 3 in (1.91 m)	—	Sr	South Plains JC, Texas	San Antonio, Texas
G		Anthony Brown	6 ft 5 in (1.96 m)	—	Fr

Head coach

- David Hobbs

Assistant coach(es)

Legend

- (C) Team captain
- (S) Suspended
- (I) Ineligible
- (W) Walk-on
- Injured
- Current redshirt

== Schedule and results ==
Date time, TV	Rank^{#}	Opponent^{#}	Result	Record	Site city, state
Regular Season
November 16, 1994*	No. 18	Kansas State	W 79–48	1–0	Coleman Coliseum; Tuscaloosa, Alabama
November 17, 1994*	No. 18	at New Mexico State	L 69–86	1–1	Pan American Center; Las Cruces, New Mexico
December 3, 1994*		at VCU	W 75–57	2–1	Richmond Coliseum; Richmond, Virginia
December 7, 1994*		FIU	W 77–54	3–1	Coleman Coliseum; Tuscaloosa, Alabama
December 17, 1994*		Florida A&M	W 95–48	4–1	Coleman Coliseum; Tuscaloosa, Alabama
December 19, 1994*		UCF	W 73–60	5–1	Coleman Coliseum; Tuscaloosa, Alabama
December 22, 1994*		at Tulane	L 68–72	5–2	Coleman Coliseum; Tuscaloosa, Alabama
December 28, 1994*		TCU	W 83–64	6–2	Oakland Coliseum; Oakland, California
December 29, 1994*		at No. 14 California	W 76–73 ^{OT}	7–2	Oakland Coliseum; Oakland, California
January 2, 1995*		Central Connecticut State	W 86–39	8–2	Coleman Coliseum; Oakland, California
January 4, 1995		at Vanderbilt	L 74–75 ^{OT}	8–3 (0–1)	Memorial Gymnasium; Nashville, Tennessee
January 7, 1995*		VMI	W 93–67	9–3	Coleman Coliseum; Tuscaloosa, Alabama
January 11, 1995		at Ole Miss	W 74–60	10–3 (1–1)	Tad Smith Coliseum; Oxford, Mississippi
January 14, 1995		South Carolina	W 91–59	11–3 (2–1)	Coleman Coliseum; Tuscaloosa, Alabama
January 17, 1995		LSU	L 61–74	11–4 (2–2)	Coleman Coliseum; Tuscaloosa, Alabama
January 21, 1995		Mississippi State	W 68–64	12–4 (3–2)	Coleman Coliseum; Tuscaloosa, Alabama
January 24, 1985		at No. 9 Arkansas	W 88–70	13–4 (4–2)	Bud Walton Arena; Fayetteville, Arkansas
January 28, 1995		at Tennessee	W 69–46	14–4 (5–2)	Thompson-Boling Arena; Knoxville, Tennessee
February 1, 1995	No. 20	Auburn	W 65–63	15–4 (6–2)	Coleman Coliseum; Tuscaloosa, Alabama
February 4, 1995	No. 20	Georgia	L 58–72	15–5 (6–3)	Coleman Coliseum; Tuscaloosa, Alabama
February 7, 1995	No. 23	Southern Miss	W 65–60	16–5	Coleman Coliseum; Tuscaloosa, Alabama
February 11, 1995	No. 23	at LSU	W 74–66	17–5 (7–3)	Maravich Assembly Center; Baton Rouge, Louisiana
February 15, 1995; 7:00 p m., JPS	No. 18	No. 10 Arkansas	L 80–86	17–6 (7–4)	Coleman Coliseum; Tuscaloosa, Alabama
February 18, 1995	No. 18	at Auburn	W 86–73	18–6 (8–4)	Memorial Coliseum; Auburn, Alabama
February 21, 1995	No. 20	No. 6 Kentucky	L 52–72	18–7 (8–5)	Coleman Coliseum; Tuscaloosa, Alabama
February 25, 1995	No. 20	at Florida	W 69–66	19–7 (9–5)	O'Connell Center; Gainesville, Florida
March 1, 1995	No. 21	Ole Miss	W 69–50	20–7 (10–5)	Coleman Coliseum; Tuscaloosa, Alabama
March 4, 1995	No. 21	at No. 14 Mississippi State	L 67–71	20–8 (10–6)	Humphrey Coliseum; Starkville, Mississippi
SEC Tournament
March 9, 1995; JPS	(W3) No. 20	(E6) Tennessee; First Round	W 55–43	21–8	Georgia Dome; Atlanta, Georgia
March 10, 1995; JPS	(W3) No. 20	(E2) Georgia; Second Round	W 68–57	22–8	Georgia Dome; Atlanta, Georgia
March 11, 1995; JPS	(W3) No. 20	(W1) No. 5 Arkansas; Semifinals	L 58–69	22–9	Georgia Dome; Atlanta, Georgia
NCAA Tournament
March 16, 1995*; CBS	(5 E) No. 20	(12 E) Penn; First Round	W 91–85 ^{OT}	23–9	Baltimore Arena; Baltimore, Maryland
March 18, 1995*; CBS	(5 E) No. 20	(4 E) No. 14 Oklahoma State; Second Round	L 52–66	23–10	Baltimore Arena; Baltimore, Maryland
*Non-conference game. ^{#}Rankings from AP poll. (#) Tournament seedings in parentheses. SE=Southeast.
