= Antoine Walker =

American basketball player (born 1976)

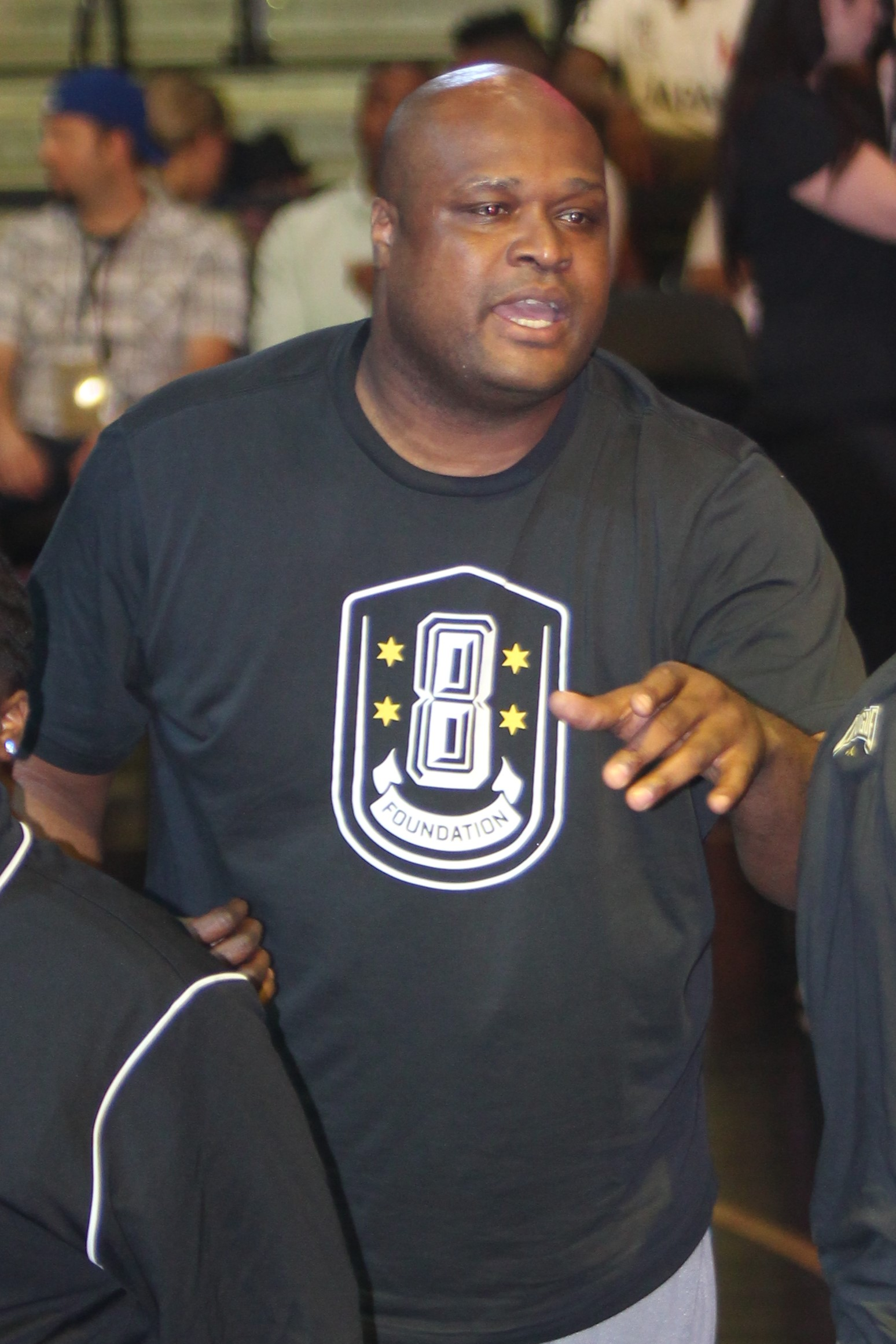
- Walker coaching in the Nike summer basketball Chi-League in 2014

Personal information
- Born: August 12, 1976 (age 50) Chicago, Illinois, U.S.
- Listed height: 6 ft 9 in (2.06 m)
- Listed weight: 245 lb (111 kg)

Career information
- High school: Mount Carmel (Chicago, Illinois)
- College: Kentucky (1994–1996)
- NBA draft: 1996: 1st round, 6th overall pick
- Drafted by: Boston Celtics
- Playing career: 1996–2012
- Position: Power forward / small forward
- Number: 8, 88, 24

Career history
- 1996–2003: Boston Celtics
- 2003–2004: Dallas Mavericks
- 2004–2005: Atlanta Hawks
- 2005: Boston Celtics
- 2005–2007: Miami Heat
- 2007–2008: Minnesota Timberwolves
- 2010: Mets de Guaynabo
- 2010–2012: Idaho Stampede

Career highlights
- NBA champion (2006); 3× NBA All-Star (1998, 2002, 2003); NBA All-Rookie First Team (1997); NCAA champion (1996); First-team All-SEC (1996); SEC tournament MVP (1995); McDonald's All-American (1994); First-team Parade All-American (1994)

Career NBA statistics
- Points: 15,647 (17.5 ppg)
- Rebounds: 6,891 (7.7 rpg)
- Assists: 3,170 (3.5 apg)
- Stats at NBA.com
- Stats at Basketball Reference

Antoine Devon Walker (born August 12, 1976) is an American former professional basketball player. He was drafted with the sixth overall pick in the 1996 NBA draft out of the University of Kentucky and played in the NBA from 1996 to 2008. Walker played for the Boston Celtics, Dallas Mavericks, Atlanta Hawks, Miami Heat, Minnesota Timberwolves, the BSN's Mets de Guaynabo and the NBA D-League's Idaho Stampede before retiring from basketball in 2012. Walker, a three-time NBA All-Star, won an NCAA championship with Kentucky in 1996 and an NBA championship with the Heat in 2006.

== Pre-NBA career ==
Walker attended Mount Carmel High School, in Chicago, where he played with future NFL quarterback Donovan McNabb and attained all-state status as a senior, earning a full scholarship to play for Rick Pitino at the University of Kentucky. He was a starting forward on the Wildcats' 1996 NCAA Men's Division I Basketball Championship Game-winning team. As a freshman at Kentucky he was named SEC Tournament MVP. In his sophomore year, Walker was named All-SEC First, All-SEC Tournament and to the All-NCAA Regional Teams.

== Professional career ==
=== Boston Celtics (1996–2003) ===
After Walker's sophomore season, he declared for the 1996 NBA draft and was picked sixth overall by the Boston Celtics. In the 1996–1997 season, Walker made the All-Rookie First Team and led the team in scoring (17.5 ppg) and rebounding (9.0), as the team had its worst season in franchise history, 15–67. The following season, Pitino was reunited with Walker as the new coach of the Celtics and he made the All-Star team as a reserve while averaging 22.4 ppg and 10.2 rpg. He also scored a career-high 49 points in a loss against the Washington Wizards. Walker's success led to his appearance on the cover of NBA Live 99.

In the 1998 draft, the Celtics had the 10th pick and chose swing man Paul Pierce. In the 2001–2002 season, Walker had his best overall season by helping lead the Celtics to a 49–33 record and their first playoff berth in seven years. He was second on his team in scoring (22.0), first in rebounds (9), and first in assists (5.0). Pierce and Walker took the team to the Eastern Conference finals, where they fell to the New Jersey Nets in six games. The next season, Walker made his third All-Star team. On February 20, 2002, former Kentucky teammate Tony Delk was traded to the Celtics, reuniting Walker with him.

=== Dallas Mavericks (2003–2004) and Atlanta Hawks (2004–2005) ===
Ten days before the start of the 2003–04 season, Walker was traded with Delk to the Dallas Mavericks for Raef LaFrentz, Chris Mills, Jiří Welsch, and a 2004 first-round draft pick. On August 8, 2004, Walker and Delk were traded again, this time to the Atlanta Hawks for Jason Terry, longtime Hawk Alan Henderson and a conditional 2007 first-round draft pick. As the pick did not convey, Dallas received cash considerations from Atlanta instead.

=== Return to Celtics (2005) ===
On February 24, 2005, Walker was traded back to the Celtics in a deal that sent Gary Payton, Tom Gugliotta, Michael Stewart, and a first-round draft pick to the Hawks. (Payton was released by the Hawks and re-signed with Boston for the remainder of the season). Walker started all 24 remaining games for the Celtics, averaging 16.3 points and 8.3 rebounds a game as the Celtics advanced to the playoffs before losing to the Indiana Pacers in a 7-game first round series. For his second stint with the Celtics, Walker briefly chose to wear the uniform number 88, as his trademark 8 jersey was being worn by rookie Al Jefferson. Jefferson would switch to number 7 after two games.

=== Miami Heat (2005–2007) ===
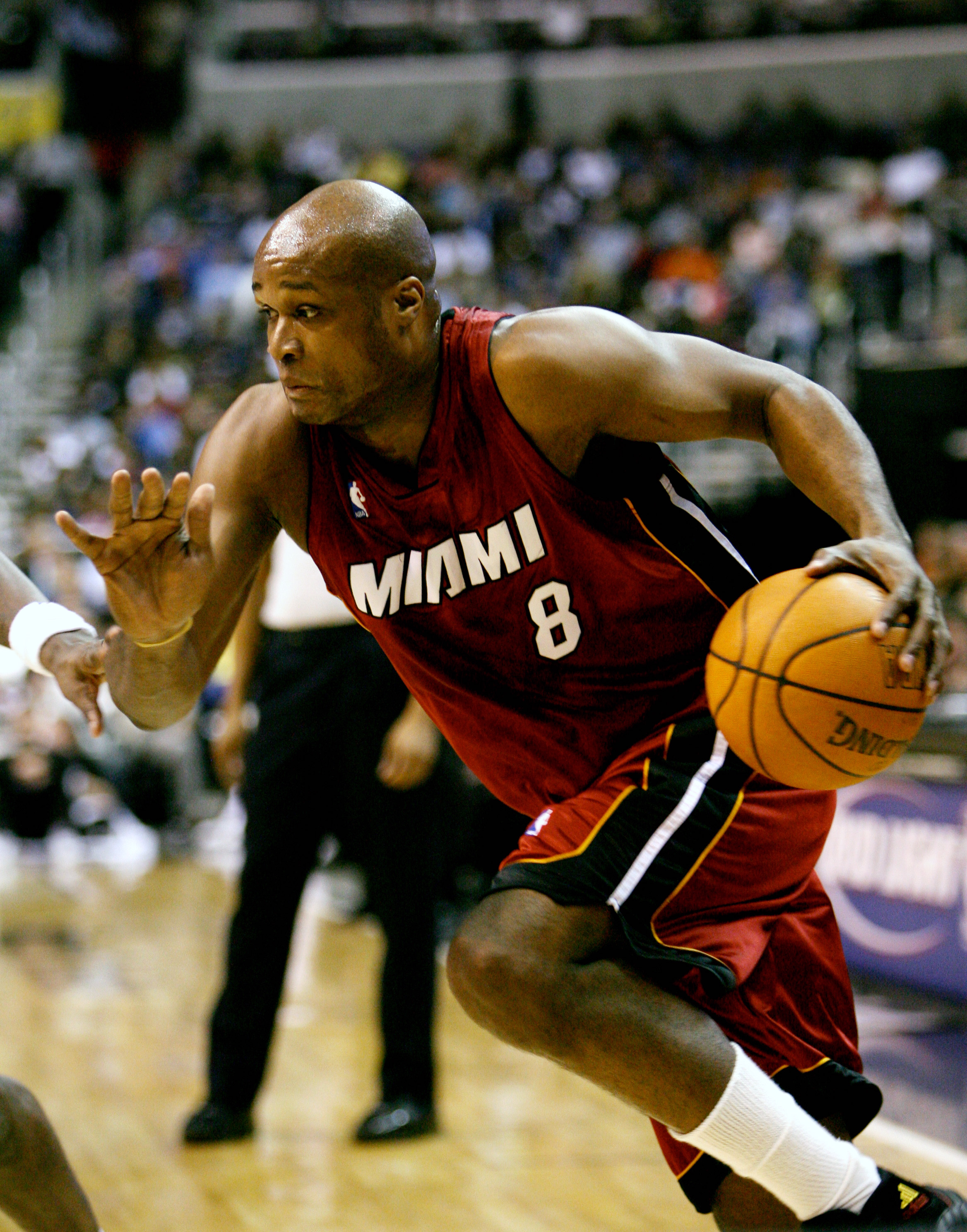
Walker won an NBA championship with the Heat in 2006.

On August 2, 2005, Walker was involved in a five-team, 13-player deal (the largest trade in NBA history) that sent him from the Celtics to the Miami Heat. The Celtics received Curtis Borchardt, Qyntel Woods, the draft rights of Albert Miralles, and draft picks in the deal. The move reunited Walker with Celtics teammate Gary Payton. The Heat played Walker mostly off the bench, and he rotated between both forward positions. He finished the season with averages of 12.2 points and 5.1 rebounds a game as the team's main scorer off the bench. Walker also led the team in overall 3-point shots made for the season, and increased his 3-point, free throw and overall shooting percentages.

In the playoffs his production would increase, as he would be the third leading scorer for the team, posting 20 points in four different playoff games, including 23 against the New Jersey Nets in the closing game of the conference semifinals. Miami advanced to the NBA Finals and faced the Dallas Mavericks, with Walker posting 13.8 points per game in the series as the Heat won the NBA championship in 6 games. In the title clinching sixth game in Dallas, Walker contributed 14 points and 11 rebounds. Walker's production dipped in the 2006–2007 season as he averaged 8.5 points a game and 4.3 rebounds. The Heat failed to repeat as champions following a first round loss to the Chicago Bulls.

=== Minnesota Timberwolves (2007–2008) ===
On October 24, 2007, Walker was traded to the Minnesota Timberwolves along with Michael Doleac, Wayne Simien, a first-round draft pick and cash considerations in exchange for Ricky Davis and Mark Blount. On June 27, 2008, Walker was dealt to the Memphis Grizzlies along with Marko Jarić, Greg Buckner, and the rights to O. J. Mayo, for Mike Miller, Brian Cardinal, Jason Collins, and the rights to Kevin Love. After appearing in just two preseason games and remaining inactive throughout the opening months of the regular season, he was waived by the Grizzlies on December 19, 2008.

=== Mets de Guaynabo (2010) and Idaho Stampede (2010–2012) ===
In February 2010, Walker signed with the Guaynabo Mets, along with former Chicago Bulls player Marcus Fizer. Walker was released on April 1, 2010.

On May 6, 2010, ESPN reported that Walker was trying to return to the NBA. On December 7, 2010, Walker was acquired by Idaho Stampede of the NBA Development League. It was reported in April 2012 that Walker had announced his retirement after two years with the Stampede.

== Personal life ==
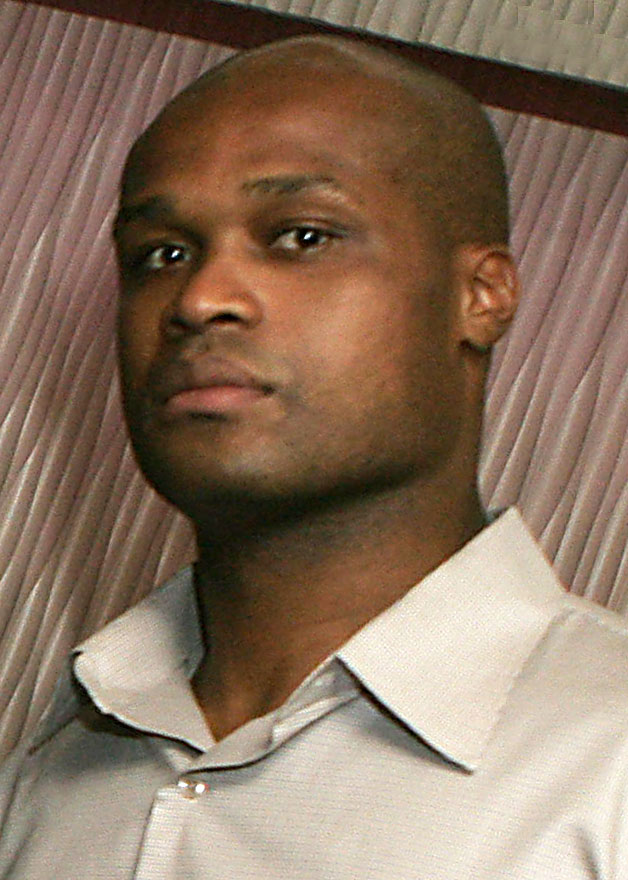
Walker in December 2005

Walker was born and raised on the South Side of Chicago. He attended Mount Carmel High School. Walker was engaged to reality star Evelyn Lozada of Basketball Wives from 1998 until 2008.

Walker was a basketball analyst on 120 Sports. Walker was also hired by SEC Network as a basketball analyst.

=== Legal issues ===
In 1997, Walker's roommate Michael Irvin, as well as NBA players Ron Mercer and Chauncey Billups, Walker was identified in a lawsuit by a woman who said she was raped in Walker's home. Walker was also named in the lawsuit, and although he was not allegeded to have participated in the assault, he was accused of walking through the room while it took place. The case was settled in 2000.

On January 5, 2009, Walker was arrested for driving under the influence in Miami Beach, Florida.

On July 15, 2009, Walker was charged with three felony counts of writing bad checks stemming from over $800,000 in gambling debts he had incurred at three Las Vegas casinos. Walker was arrested on July 15 at Harrah's Casino in South Lake Tahoe, Nevada. He was in South Lake Tahoe to play in the American Century Celebrity Golf Classic the following day. On June 30, 2010, Walker entered a plea of not guilty on felony bad check charges stemming from his failure to pay $770,000 in gambling losses to Caesars Palace and two other casinos in Las Vegas, according to the Las Vegas Review Journal. One year later, he pleaded guilty to one felony count of passing a bad check. Under the plea agreement, he did not face a prison term, and was put on probation and worked towards repaying the debt.

In July 2000, Walker and former University of Kentucky teammate Nazr Mohammed were robbed outside a South Side Chicago restaurant. On July 9, 2007, Walker and another individual were robbed at gunpoint by two offenders in his own house. The assailants made off with close to $200,000 worth of merchandise, including Walker's Mercedes. His car was later recovered having been stripped of its expensive aftermarket wheels and stereo system. Four men were charged in this robbery; two of them were also linked to the similar robbery of fellow NBA player Eddy Curry.

On May 18, 2010, Walker filed for Chapter 7 bankruptcy protection in the Southern District of Florida (Miami) with total assets of $4.3 million and debts of $12.7 million. The filing listed four pieces of real estate including a $2.3 million Miami home that was underwater with a mortgage of $3.6 million, and three other properties in Chicago, one listed for $1.4 million. Nazr Mohammed paid half the fee of Walker's bankruptcy attorney. Walker's championship ring had to be sold off. In August 2013, Walker announced that he was debt-free. Between 1996 and 2009, Walker earned more than $108 million from NBA salaries.

== Career statistics ==
Legend
GP	Games played	GS	Games started	MPG	Minutes per game
FG%	Field goal percentage	3P%	3-point field goal percentage	FT%	Free throw percentage
RPG	Rebounds per game	APG	Assists per game	SPG	Steals per game
BPG	Blocks per game	PPG	Points per game	**Bold**	Career high
†	Won an NBA championship	*	Led the league

=== NBA ===
==== Regular season ====
Year	Team	GP	GS	MPG	FG%	3P%	FT%	RPG	APG	SPG	BPG	PPG
1996–97	Boston	**82**	68	36.2	.425	.327	.631	9.0	3.2	1.3	.6	17.5
1997–98	Boston	**82***	**82***	39.9	.423	.312	.645	**10.2**	3.3	**1.7**	.7	22.4
1998–99	Boston	42	41	36.9	.412	**.369**	.559	8.5	3.1	1.5	.7	18.7
1999–00	Boston	**82**	**82***	36.6	.430	.256	.699	8.0	3.7	1.4	.4	20.5
2000–01	Boston	81	81	41.9	.413	.367	.716	8.9	**5.5**	**1.7**	.6	**23.4**
2001–02	Boston	81	81	**42.0**	.394	.344	**.741**	8.8	5.0	1.5	.5	22.1
2002–03	Boston	78	78	41.5	.388	.323	.615	7.2	4.8	1.5	.4	20.1
2003–04	Dallas	**82**	**82**	34.6	.428	.269	.554	8.3	4.5	.8	.8	14.0
2004–05	Atlanta	53	53	40.2	.415	.317	.534	9.4	3.7	1.2	.6	20.4
2004–05	Boston	24	24	34.5	**.442**	.342	.557	8.3	3.0	1.0	**1.1**	16.3
2005–06†	Miami	**82***	19	26.8	.435	.358	.628	5.1	2.0	.6	.4	12.2
2006–07	Miami	78	15	23.3	.397	.275	.438	4.3	1.7	.6	.2	8.5
2007–08	Minnesota	46	1	19.4	.363	.324	.530	3.7	1.0	.7	.2	8.0
Career		893	707	35.3	.414	.325	.633	7.7	3.5	1.2	.5	17.5
All-Star		3	1	13.3	.350	.300	.500	2.0	1.3	.7	.0	6.0

==== Playoffs ====
Year	Team	GP	GS	MPG	FG%	3P%	FT%	RPG	APG	SPG	BPG	PPG
2002	Boston	16	16	43.9	.411	.385	.781	8.6	3.3	1.5	.4	**22.1**
2003	Boston	10	10	**44.0**	**.415**	.356	.500	8.7	**4.3**	**1.7**	.4	17.3
2004	Dallas	5	5	28.0	.361	.100	.571	**10.0**	2.4	1.2	.6	9.8
2005	Boston	6	6	37.3	.413	.368	.636	7.3	2.3	1.2	**1.0**	16.7
2006†	Miami	**23**	**23**	37.5	.403	.324	.574	5.6	2.4	1.0	.3	13.3
2007	Miami	4	0	23.0	.405	**.500**	**.818**	2.3	1.5	.5	.3	11.8
Career		64	60	38.5	.406	.352	.663	7.1	2.9	1.2	.4	16.1

=== College ===
Year	Team	GP	GS	MPG	FG%	3P%	FT%	RPG	APG	SPG	BPG	PPG
1994–95	Kentucky	33	2	14.5	.419	**.309**	**.712**	4.5	1.4	.8	.2	7.8
1995–96	Kentucky	**36**	**35**	**27.0**	**.463**	.188	.631	**8.4**	**2.9**	**1.7**	**.7**	**15.2**
Career		69	37	21.0	.449	.252	.660	6.5	2.2	1.3	.5	11.7

== See also ==
- List of National Basketball Association career 3-point scoring leaders
- List of National Basketball Association career turnovers leaders
