= 1994–95 UMass Minutemen basketball team =

American college basketball season

1994–95 UMass Minutemen men's basketball
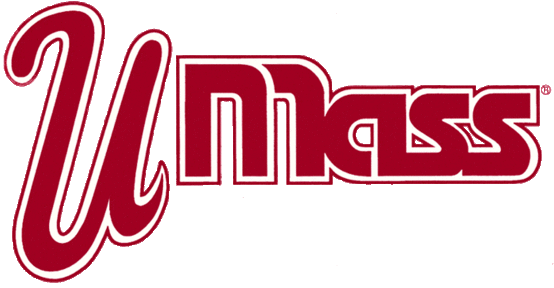

Atlantic 10 regular season champions Atlantic 10 tournament champions

NCAA tournament, Elite Eight
- Conference: Atlantic 10 Conference

Ranking
- Coaches: No. 7
- AP: No. 7
- Record: 29–5 (13–3 A-10)
- Head coach: John Calipari (7th season)
- Assistant coaches: Bruiser Flint; Bill Bayno; John Robic
- Home arena: William D. Mullins Memorial Center

1994–95 Atlantic 10 men's basketball standings
	Conf.				Overall
Team	W		L	PCT	W		L	PCT
No. 7 UMass †	13	–	3	.813	29	–	5	.853
Temple	10	–	6	.625	19	–	11	.633
George Washington	10	–	6	.625	18	–	14	.563
Saint Joseph's	9	–	7	.563	17	–	12	.586
St. Bonaventure	9	–	7	.563	18	–	13	.581
West Virginia	7	–	9	.438	13	–	13	.500
Rutgers	7	–	9	.438	13	–	15	.464
Duquesne	5	–	11	.313	10	–	18	.357
Rhode Island	2	–	14	.125	7	–	20	.259
† 1995 Atlantic 10 Tournament winner Rankings from AP Poll

The 1994–95 UMass Minutemen basketball team represented the University of Massachusetts Amherst during the 1994–95 NCAA Division I men's basketball season. The Minutemen, led by seventh year head coach John Calipari, played their home games at William D. Mullins Memorial Center and were members of the Atlantic 10 Conference. They finished the season 29–5, 13–3 in A-10 play to finish in first place.

== Roster ==
Number	Name	Position	Height	Weight	Year	Hometown
3	Dana Dingle	Forward	6–6	200	Junior	Bronx, New York
4	Donta Bright	Forward	6–6	205	Junior	Baltimore, Maryland
5	Jason Germain	Guard	6–1	160	Senior	South Hadley, Massachusetts
10	Mike Williams	Guard	6–2	175	Senior	Hartford, Connecticut
11	Andre Burks	Guard	6–1	180	Freshman	Baton Rouge, Louisiana
12	Edgar Padilla	Guard	6–1	165	Sophomore	Toa Alta, Puerto Rico
14	Derek Kellogg	Guard	6–3	185	Senior	Springfield, Massachusetts
15	Lou Roe	Forward	6–7	210	Senior	Atlantic City, New Jersey
21	Marcus Camby	Center	6–11	215	Sophomore	Hartford, Connecticut
24	Carmelo Travieso	Guard	6–2	165	Sophomore	Boston, Massachusetts
33	Jeff Meyer	Center	7–2	225	Senior	Wausau, Wisconsin
34	Tyrone Weeks	Forward	6–6	240	Sophomore	Philadelphia, Pennsylvania
40	Ted Cottrell	Center/Forward	6–9	210	Junior	Annapolis, Maryland
50	Inus Norville	Forward	6–8	225	Freshman	Fayetteville, North Carolina

== Schedule ==
Date time, TV	Rank^{#}	Opponent^{#}	Result	Record	Site (attendance) city, state
Regular season
11/25/1994*	No. 3	No. 1 Arkansas; Starter Tip-off Classic	W 104–80	1–0	Springfield Civic Center (8,999); Springfield, Massachusetts
12/3/1994*	No. 1	vs. No. 7 Kansas; Wooden Classic	L 75–81	1–1	Arrowhead Pond (18,300); Anaheim, California
12/07/1994*	No. 5	Pittsburgh	W 85–57	2–1	Mullins Center (9,493); Amherst, Massachusetts
12/10/1994*	No. 5	at No. 11 Maryland	W 85–74	3–1	Baltimore Convention Center (13,332); Baltimore, Maryland
12/14/1994*	No. 5	Princeton	W 88–67	4–1	Mullins Center (9,493); Amherst, Massachusetts
12/17/1994*	No. 5	Western Kentucky	W 91–72	5–1	Mullins Center (9,493); Amherst, MA
01/03/1995	No. 4	West Virginia; Abdow's Holiday Classic	W 95–65	6–1 (1–0)	Springfield Civic Center (8,590); Springfield, Massachusetts
01/05/1995*	No. 4	at St. Louis; Atlantic 10/Great Midwest Challenge	W 80–74	7–1	Kiel Center (21,879); St. Louis, Missouri
01/07/1995*	No. 4	vs. La Salle; Rainbow Classic	W 87–64	8–1	Atlantic City Convention Center (8,033); Atlantic City, New Jersey
01/10/1995	No. 1	at St. Bonaventure	W 81–76 ^{OT}	9–1 (2–0)	Reilly Center (6,000); Olean, New York
1/12/1995	No. 1	Rutgers	W 85–68	10–1 (3–0)	Mullins Center (9,493); Amherst, Massachusetts
01/14/1995*	No. 1	No. 25 Pennsylvania	W 93–60	11–1	Mullins Center (9,493); Amherst, Massachusetts
01/19/1995	No. 1	at Rhode Island	W 91–75	12–1 (4–0)	Providence Civic Center (13,100); Providence, Rhode Island
01/21/1995	No. 1	Temple	W 59–58	13–1 (5–0)	Mullins Center (9,493); Amherst, Massachusetts
01/24/1995	No. 1	at Duquesne	W 103–53	14–1 (6–0)	Palumbo Center (6,064); Pittsburgh, Pennsylvania
01/27/1995	No. 1	at West Virginia	W 97–94 ^{OT}	15–1 (7–0)	WVU Coliseum (13,862); Morgantown, West Virginia
01/30/1995	No. 1	St. Bonaventure	W 79–62	16–1 (8–0)	Mullins Center (9,493); Amherst, Massachusetts
02/01/1995	No. 1	Saint Joseph's	W 74–62	17–1 (9–0)	Mullins Center (9,493); Amherst, Massachusetts
02/04/1995	No. 1	at George Washington	L 75–78	17–2 (9–1)	Charles E. Smith Center (5,020); Washington, D.C.
02/07/1995	No. 4	at Rutgers	L 29–31	game suspended*	Louis Brown Athletic Center (8,526); New Brunswick, New Jersey
02/11/1995*	No. 4	at Southwestern Louisiana	W 94–63	18–2	Cajundome (10,651); Lafayette, Louisiana
02/14/1995	No. 5	George Washington	L 78–80	18–3 (9–2)	Mullins Center (9,493); Amherst, Massachusetts
02/16/1995	No. 5	Duquesne	W 73–56	19–3 (10–2)	Mullins Center (9,493); Amherst, Massachusetts
2/19/1995*	No. 5	Louisville	W 91–76	20–3	Worcester Centrum (13,758); Worcester, Massachusetts
02/23/1995	No. 5	at Temple	L 63–72	20–4 (10–3)	McGonigle Hall (3,900); Philadelphia, Pennsylvania
02/25/1995	No. 5	at Saint Joseph's	W 77–58	21–4 (11–3)	Alumni Memorial Fieldhouse (3,200); Philadelphia, Pennsylvania
02/28/1995	No. 8	Rhode Island	W 86–71	22–4 (12–3)	Mullins Center (9,493); Amherst, MA
03/03/1995	No. 8	vs. Rutgers	W 77–62@	23–4 (13–3)	Spectrum (arena) (8,526); Philadelphia, Pennsylvania
1995 Atlantic 10 men's basketball tournament
03/05/1995*	No. 8	at Duquesne; Quarterfinal	W 79–53	24–4	The Palestra (7,273); Philadelphia, Pennsylvania
03/06/1995	No. 8	vs. Saint Joseph's; Semifinals	W 68–57	25–4	The Palestra (8,722); Philadelphia, Pennsylvania
03/09/1995	No. 8	Temple; Final	W 63–44	26–4	Mullins Center (9,493); Amherst, Massachusetts
1995 NCAA Division I men's basketball tournament
03/17/1995*	No. 7	vs. Saint Peter's; East Region First round	W 68–51	27–4	Knickerbocker Arena (15,100); Albany, New York
03/19/1995*	No. 7	vs. Stanford; East Region Second Round	W 75–53	28–4	Knickerbocker Arena (11,931); Albany, New York
03/24/1995*	No. 7	vs. Tulsa; East Regional semifinal	W 76–51	29–4	Brendan Byrne Arena (19,689); East Rutherford, New Jersey
03/26/1995*	No. 7	vs. Oklahoma State; East Regional final	L 54–68	29–5	Brendan Byrne Arena (19,689); East Rutherford, New Jersey
*Non-conference game. ^{#}Rankings from AP Poll. (#) Tournament seedings in parentheses. All times are in Eastern Time.

- Game suspended due to protest at halftime.

@ Game resumed at neutral site, with score continuing from suspended game, per ruling by A-10 Commissioner.
