= 1995 SEC men's basketball tournament =

American college basketball tournament

- Classification: Division I
- Season: 1994–95
- Teams: 12
- Site: Georgia Dome; Atlanta, Georgia (USA)
- Champions: Kentucky (20th title)
- Winning coach: Rick Pitino (4th title)
- MVP: Antoine Walker (Kentucky)
- Attendance: 250,301
- Television: Jefferson Pilot Sports (Entire tournament); ESPN2 (Championship game; available nationally and outside the SEC footprint)

1994–95 Southeastern Conference men's basketball standings
	Conf.				Overall
Team	W		L	PCT	W		L	PCT
East Division
No. 2 Kentucky †	14	–	2	.875	28	–	5	.848
Georgia	9	–	7	.563	18	–	10	.643
Florida	8	–	8	.500	17	–	13	.567
Vanderbilt	6	–	10	.375	13	–	15	.464
South Carolina	5	–	11	.313	10	–	17	.370
Tennessee	4	–	12	.250	11	–	16	.407
West Division
No. 6 Arkansas	12	–	4	.750	32	–	7	.821
No. 18 Mississippi State	12	–	4	.750	22	–	8	.733
No. 20 Alabama	10	–	6	.625	23	–	10	.697
Auburn	7	–	9	.438	16	–	13	.552
LSU	6	–	10	.375	12	–	15	.444
Ole Miss	3	–	13	.188	8	–	19	.296
† 1995 SEC tournament winner Rankings from AP Poll

The 1995 SEC Men’s Basketball Tournament took place from March 9–12, 1995 at the Georgia Dome in Atlanta, Georgia. The Kentucky Wildcats won the tournament and the SEC’s automatic bid to the 1995 NCAA Men’s Division I Basketball Tournament by defeating the Arkansas Razorbacks in a 95–93 overtime win.

== Television coverage ==
The entire tournament was regionally televised and syndicated by Jefferson Pilot Sports. JP Sports, at the time, was in its eighth season in covering SEC Basketball, and the 1995 tournament was the fourth time that Jefferson Pilot Sports covered the entire tournament. However, the championship game was also broadcast by ESPN2 in areas outside the SEC’s geographical footprint, meaning that the ESPN2 broadcast was blacked out in areas where Jefferson Pilot’s broadcast was available on a local station.

== Tournament notes ==
- This was the first time the Georgia Dome served as the home of the SEC Men’s Basketball Tournament.

== Bracket ==
First round
W4	Auburn	81
E5	South Carolina	66
E3	Florida	63
W6	Ole Miss	59
E4	Vanderbilt	85
W5	LSU	61
W3	#20 Alabama	68
E6	Tennessee	57

Second Round
E1	#3 Kentucky	93
W4	Auburn	81
E3	Florida	80
W2	#15 Mississippi State	64
W1	#5 Arkansas	73
E4	Vanderbilt	72
W3	#20 Alabama	68
E2	Georgia	57

Semifinals
E1	#3 Kentucky	86
E3	Florida	72
W1	#5 Arkansas	69
W3	#20 Alabama	58

Championship Game
E1	#3 Kentucky	95^{OT}
W1	#5 Arkansas	93
