= 1994–95 Nicholls State Colonels men's basketball team =

American college basketball season

1994–95 Nicholls Colonels men's basketball

Southland tournament champions

NCAA tournament, First Round
- Conference: Southland Conference
- Record: 24–6 (17–1 Southland)
- Head coach: Rickey Broussard (5th season)
- Home arena: Stopher Gymnasium

1994–95 Southland Conference men's basketball standings
	Conf.				Overall
Team	W		L	PCT	W		L	PCT
Nicholls State †	17	–	1	.944	24	–	6	.800
UTSA	11	–	7	.611	15	–	13	.536
Northeast Louisiana	11	–	7	.611	14	–	18	.438
North Texas	9	–	9	.500	14	–	13	.519
Stephen F. Austin	9	–	9	.500	14	–	14	.500
Northwestern State	8	–	10	.444	13	–	14	.481
Southwest Texas State	7	–	11	.389	12	–	14	.462
McNeese State	7	–	11	.389	11	–	16	.407
Texas-Arlington	7	–	11	.389	10	–	17	.370
Sam Houston State	4	–	14	.222	7	–	19	.269
† 1995 Southland tournament winner Rankings from AP Poll

The 1994–95 Nicholls State Colonels men's basketball team represented Nicholls State University in the 1994–95 NCAA Division I men's basketball season. The Colonels, led by fifth-year head coach Rickey Broussard, played their home games at Stopher Gymnasium in Thibodaux, Louisiana as members of the Southland Conference. The Colonels rattled off 14 straight conference wins to finish atop the regular season standings by six games with a 17–1 record. They followed that by winning the Southland tournament to receive an automatic bid to the NCAA tournament – the first appearance in program history. Playing as the No. 13 seed in the Midwest region, Nicholls State lost to No. 4 seed Virginia in the opening round.

== Roster ==
1994–95 Nicholls Colonels men's basketball team
Players
Coaches

Pos.	#	Name	Height	Weight	Year	Hometown
G	5	Russell McCutcheon	6 ft 5 in (1.96 m)	—	Fr
F		Kenderick Franklin	6 ft 6 in (1.98 m)	—	Fr
F		Gerard King	6 ft 9 in (2.06 m)	—	Sr

Head coach

- Rickey Broussard

Assistant coach(es)

Legend

- (C) Team captain
- (S) Suspended
- (I) Ineligible
- (W) Walk-on
- Injured
- Current redshirt

Roster

== Schedule and results ==
Date time, TV	Rank^{#}	Opponent^{#}	Result	Record	Site (attendance) city, state
Non-conference regular season
Nov 26, 1994*		Louisiana Tech	W 90–85	1–0	Stopher Gymnasium; Thibodaux, Louisiana
Dec 3, 1994*		Louisiana Christian	W 103–61	2–0	Stopher Gymnasium; Thibodaux, Louisiana
Dec 10, 1994*		at Oklahoma	L 80–89	2–1	Lloyd Noble Center; Norman, Oklahoma
Dec 14, 1994*		Southeastern Louisiana	W 107–87	3–1	Stopher Gymnasium; Thibodaux, Louisiana
Dec 17, 1994*		Faith Baptist	W 140–51	4–1	Stopher Gymnasium; Thibodaux, Louisiana
Dec 21, 1994*		at Memphis	L 72–92	4–2	Pyramid Arena; Memphis, Tennessee
Southland regular season
Dec 28, 1994		at Stephen F. Austin	W 90–84	5–2 (1–0)	William R. Johnson Coliseum; Nacogdoches, Texas
Mar 1, 1995		Stephen F. Austin	W 107–77	21–5 (17–1)	Stopher Gymnasium; Thibodaux, Louisiana
Southland Tournament
Mar 8, 1995*		McNeese State; Quarterfinals	W 88–69	22–5	Stopher Gymnasium; Thibodaux, Louisiana
Mar 9, 1995*		vs. Stephen F. Austin; Semifinals	W 91–89	23–5	Hirsch Memorial Coliseum; Shreveport, Louisiana
Mar 10, 1995*		vs. Louisiana-Monroe; Championship game	W 98–87	24–5	Hirsch Memorial Coliseum; Shreveport, Louisiana
NCAA Tournament
Mar 16, 1995*	(13 MW)	vs. (4 MW) No. 13 Virginia; First round	L 72–96	24–6	University of Dayton Arena; Dayton, Ohio
*Non-conference game. ^{#}Rankings from AP Poll. (#) Tournament seedings in parentheses. All times are in Central.
