= Rickey Broussard =

American men's basketball coach

Rickey J. Broussard
Personal information
- Born: September 28, 1948 (age 78) Lafayette, Louisiana, U.S.

Career information
- College: University of Louisiana at Lafayette
- Coaching career: 1983–2004

Career history

Coaching
- 1983–1986: Louisiana–Lafayette (assistant)
- 1986–1989: South Florida (assistant)
- 1990–2002: Nicholls State
- 2002–2004: LSU (assistant)

Career highlights
- Louisiana Basketball Hall of Fame (2016)

Rickey J. Broussard (born September 28, 1948) is an American former college basketball coach and college athletics administrator. He was the men’s basketball coach at Nicholls State University from 1990 to 2002, leading them to two Southland Conference regular-season championships, two conference tournament championships, and the first two NCAA Division I tournament appearances in the program’s history.

== Biography ==
Broussard was born in Lafayette, Louisiana on September 28, 1948. He is a 1970 graduate of University of Louisiana at Lafayette (formerly University of Southwestern Louisiana).

=== Early Coaching Career ===
Broussard first served as an assistant coach for Louisiana-Lafayette from 1983-1986. He would then take on the same role at University of South Florida from 1986-1989. He also coached several high schools in the Lafayette area.

=== Nicholls State ===
Broussard would become the head men’s basketball coach for Nicholls State in 1990. Broussard led Nicholls to Southland Conference tournament championships in the 1994-1995 and 1997-1998 seasons. Broussard led Nicholls to its first Division 1 tournament appearance in 1995. He coached for a total of 12 seasons at Nicholls State.

=== 1994-1995 Season ===
Nicholls finished 24-6 and 17-1 in the Southland Conference play. They would win the Southland regular season championship and the Southland Conference tournament respectively. Nicholl’s State would then receive an automatic NCAA Tournament bid, making it the first NCAA Division I Tournament appearance in the school's history. They entered the tournament as a No.13 seed and lost to No. 4 seed Virginia in the first round.

=== 1997-1998 Season ===
Nicholls would finish 19-10 for the season. Nicholls finished 15-1 in conference play, including a 14 game winning streak. They would win the Southland regular-season championship and tournament and would return to the NCAA Tournament for the second time.

=== LSU ===
Broussard would join LSU as the men’s basketball assistant coach under John Brady, whom he had known since 1977. LSU described Broussard as a strong recruiter with postseason experience and excellent on-court teaching ability. LSU men’s basketball would reach the NCAA Tournament in 2003 under his tenure. He would resign from the position in 2004.

=== Coaching Style ===
Broussard has been described as a very strong recruiter during his career. He is also noted for his postseason tournament experience and excellent on-court teaching ability. Former LSU men’s basketball coach John Brady has described him as “an extremely positive person, [and] an excellent teacher”. He also noted him as a talented and loyal individual.

== Honors ==
Broussard remains associated with the most successful period for Nicholls Division I basketball. He is only the second coach in Nicholls history to reach 150 wins. Broussard was inducted into the Louisiana Basketball Hall of Fame in 2016. In 2018, a portable court was installed within Stopher Gymnasium dedicated to Broussard.
