= 1994–95 UCLA Bruins men's basketball team =

American college basketball season

1994–95 UCLA Bruins men's basketball

NCAA tournament National Champions NCAA tournament West Regional champions NCAA Division I regular season champions Pac-10 regular season champions

National Championship Game, W 89–78 vs. Arkansas
- Conference: Pacific-10

Ranking
- Coaches: No. 1
- AP: No. 1
- Record: 31–2 (16–2 Pac-10)
- Head coach: Jim Harrick (7th season)
- Assistant coaches: Lorenzo Romar; Mark Gottfried; Steve Lavin
- Home arena: Pauley Pavilion

1994–95 Pacific-10 Conference men's basketball standings
	Conf.				Overall
Team	W		L	PCT	W		L	PCT
No. 1 UCLA	17	–	1	.944	32	–	1	.970
No. 15 Arizona	14	–	4	.778	24	–	7	.774
No. 16 Arizona State	12	–	6	.667	24	–	9	.727
Oregon	11	–	7	.611	19	–	9	.679
Stanford	10	–	8	.556	20	–	9	.690
Washington State	10	–	8	.556	18	–	12	.600
Washington	6	–	12	.333	10	–	17	.370
Oregon State	6	–	12	.333	9	–	18	.333
USC	4	–	14	.222	9	–	19	.321
California^{1}	0	–	18	.000	0	–	27	.000
As of November 23, 2011; Rankings from AP Poll^{1}California forfeited all wins due to infractions.

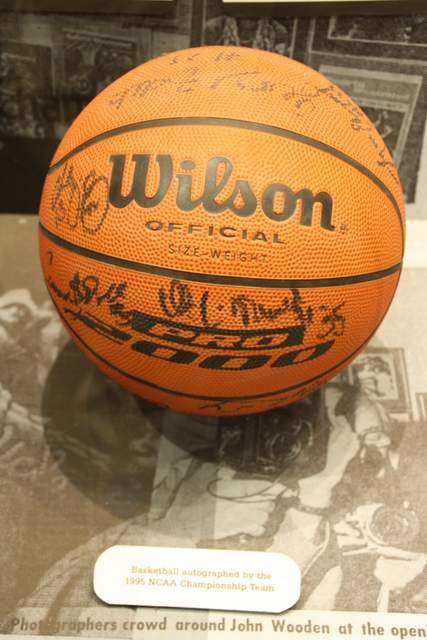
Autographed ball by 1995 NCAA championship team

The 1994–95 UCLA Bruins men's basketball team represented the University of California, Los Angeles in the 1994–95 NCAA Division I men's basketball season. The Bruins were led by Jim Harrick in his seventh season as head coach. They played their home games at the Pauley Pavilion as member of the Pac-10 Conference. They had an original record of 31–2 and 17–2 in the Pac-10, however this was adjusted in July 1997 to an official record of 32–1, 16–1 after California was forced to forfeit their victory over UCLA in the 1994–1995 season by the NCAA due to infractions.

They won the Pac-10 regular season championship with a record of 17–2. They received the conference's automatic bid to the NCAA tournament as the No. 1 seed in the West region. They defeated Florida International, Missouri, Mississippi State, and UConn to advance to the Final Four. There they defeated Oklahoma State and Arkansas to win the National Championship, marking the school's 11th title. It was their first title in twenty years and since the retirement of head coach John Wooden.

The team featured seniors Ed O'Bannon, Tyus Edney, and George Zidek; Ed's younger brother, Charles O'Bannon; and a pair of freshmen in Toby Bailey and J. R. Henderson (now known as J. R. Sakuragi). Little-used reserve Bob Myers is a former general manager of the NBA's Golden State Warriors.

== Roster ==
1994–95 UCLA Bruins men's basketball team
Players
Coaches

Pos.	#	Name	Height	Weight	Year	Hometown
G	12	Toby Bailey	6 ft 5 in (1.96 m)	215 lb (98 kg)	Fr	Los Angeles, California
G	4	Marquis Burns	6 ft 4 in (1.93 m)	188 lb (85 kg)	Jr	Los Angeles, California
F	30	Kevin Dempsey	6 ft 6 in (1.98 m)	210 lb (95 kg)	Jr	San Jose, California
G	5	Cameron Dollar	6 ft 1 in (1.85 m)	173 lb (78 kg)	So	Atlanta, Georgia
G	11	Tyus Edney (C)	5 ft 10 in (1.78 m)	195 lb (88 kg)	Sr	Gardena, California
C	50	Omm'A Givens	6 ft 10 in (2.08 m)	240 lb (109 kg)	Fr	Frances, Washington
F	52	J. R. Henderson	6 ft 9 in (2.06 m)	226 lb (103 kg)	Fr	Bakersfield, California
F	54	Kris Johnson	6 ft 4 in (1.93 m)	220 lb (100 kg)	Fr	Los Angeles, California
F	24	Bob Myers	6 ft 6 in (1.98 m)	230 lb (104 kg)	So	Danville, California
C	35	Ike Nwankwo	6 ft 11 in (2.11 m)	257 lb (117 kg)	So	Houston, Texas
F	13	Charles O'Bannon	6 ft 6 in (1.98 m)	200 lb (91 kg)	So	Bellflower, California
F	31	Ed O'Bannon (C)	6 ft 8 in (2.03 m)	222 lb (101 kg)	Sr	Los Angeles, California
C	25	George Zidek (C)	7 ft 0 in (2.13 m)	250 lb (113 kg)	Sr	Gottwaldov, Czechoslovakia

Head coach

Jim Harrick (Morris Harvey College)

Assistant coach(es)

- Mark Gottfried (Alabama)
- Steve Lavin (Chapman)
- Lorenzo Romar (Washington)

Legend

- (C) Team captain
- (S) Suspended
- (I) Ineligible
- (W) Walk-on
- Injured
- Current redshirt

Roster

== Schedule ==
Date time, TV	Rank^{#}	Opponent^{#}	Result	Record	Site city, state
Regular Season
November 26, 1994*	No. 6	Cal State Northridge	W 83–60	1–0	Pauley Pavilion (9,102); Los Angeles, CA
December 3, 1994*	No. 2	vs. No. 7 Kentucky; John R. Wooden Classic	W 82–81	2–0	Arrowhead Pond of Anaheim (18,307); Anaheim, CA
December 10, 1994*	No. 2	Cal State Fullerton	W 99–65	3–0	Pauley Pavilion (7,243); Los Angeles, CA
December 17, 1994*	No. 2	at LSU	W 92–72	4–0	Pete Maravich Assembly Center (14,551); Baton Rouge, LA
December 22, 1994*	No. 2	George Mason	W 137–100	5–0	Pauley Pavilion (10,072); Los Angeles, CA
December 23, 1994*	No. 2	North Carolina St.	W 88–80	6–0	Pauley Pavilion (12,075); Los Angeles, CA
January 5, 1995	No. 2	at Oregon	L 72–82	6–1 (0–1)	McArthur Court (10,086); Eugene, OR
January 7, 1995	No. 6	at Oregon State	W 87–78	7–1 (1–1)	Gill Coliseum (8,013); Corvallis, OR
January 12, 1995	No. 6	Washington	W 75–57	8–1 (2–1)	Pauley Pavilion (10,112); Los Angeles, CA
January 14, 1995	No. 6	Washington State	W 91–78	9–1 (3–1)	Pauley Pavilion (10,632); Los Angeles, CA
January 19, 1995	No. 4	at No. 11 Arizona	W 71–61	10–1 (4–1)	McKale Center (14,257); Tucson, AZ
January 21, 1995	No. 4	at No. 13 Arizona State	W 85–72	11–1 (5–1)	Wells Fargo Arena (13,987); Tempe, AZ
January 26, 1995	No. 4	No. 17 Stanford	W 77–74	12–1 (6–1)	Pauley Pavilion (11,783); Los Angeles, CA
January 28, 1995	No. 4	California	L 93–100^{1}	13–1 (7–1)	Pauley Pavilion (12,203); Los Angeles, CA
February 2, 1995	No. 7	at USC	W 73–69	14–1 (8–1)	Los Angeles Memorial Sports Arena (7,273); Los Angeles, CA
February 5, 1995*	No. 7	Notre Dame	W 92–55	15–1 (8–1)	Pauley Pavilion (11,617); Los Angeles, CA
February 9, 1995	No. 6	at Washington	W 74–66	16–1 (9–1)	Hec Edmundson Pavilion (7,119); Seattle, WA
February 11, 1995	No. 6	at Washington State	W 98–83	17–1 (10–1)	Beasley Coliseum (11,463); Pullman, WA
February 16, 1995	No. 6	No. 13 Arizona State	W 82–77 ^{OT}	18–1 (11–1)	Pauley Pavilion (12,318); Los Angeles, CA
February 19, 1995	No. 6	No. 12 Arizona	W 72–70	19–1 (12–1)	Pauley Pavilion (12,653); Los Angeles, CA
February 21, 1995	No. 2	at No. 19 Stanford	W 88–77	20–1 (13–1)	Maples Pavilion (7,500); Stanford, CA
February 23, 1995	No. 2	at California	W 104–88	21–1 (14–1)	Haas Pavilion (6,578); Berkeley, CA
February 26, 1995*	No. 2	Duke	W 100–77	22–1 (14–1)	Pauley Pavilion (12,857); Los Angeles, CA
March 1, 1995	No. 1	USC	W 85–66	23–1 (15–1)	Pauley Pavilion (12,608); Los Angeles, CA
March 5, 1995*	No. 1	at Louisville	W 91–73	24–1	Freedom Hall (19,872); Louisville, KY
March 9, 1995	No. 1	Oregon State	W 86–67	25–1 (16–1)	Pauley Pavilion (12,682); Los Angeles, CA
March 11, 1995	No. 1	No. 25 Oregon	W 94–78	26–1 (17–1)	Pauley Pavilion (13,037); Los Angeles, CA
NCAA tournament
March 17, 1995*	No. 1 (1)	vs. No. (16) Florida International; First Round	W 92–56	27–1	BSU Pavilion (11,863); Boise, ID
March 19, 1995*	No. 1 (1)	vs. No. 23 (8) Missouri; Second Round	W 75–74	28–1	BSU Pavilion (11,886); Boise, ID
March 23, 1995*	No. 1 (1)	vs. No. 18 (5) Mississippi State; Sweet Sixteen	W 86–67	29–1	Oakland Arena (14,399); Oakland, CA
March 25, 1995*	No. 1 (1)	vs. No. 8 (2) Connecticut; Elite Eight	W 102–96	30–1	Oakland Arena (14,399); Oakland, CA
April 1, 1995*	No. 1 (1)	vs. No. 14 (4) Oklahoma State; Final Four	W 74–61	31–1	Kingdome (38,540); Seattle, WA
April 3, 1995*	No. 1 (1)	vs. No. 6 (2) Arkansas; Championship Game	W 89–78	32–1	Kingdome (38,540); Seattle, WA
*Non-conference game. ^{#}Rankings from AP Poll. (#) Tournament seedings in parentheses. All times are in Pacific Time^{1}California later forfeited the game.

== Highlights ==
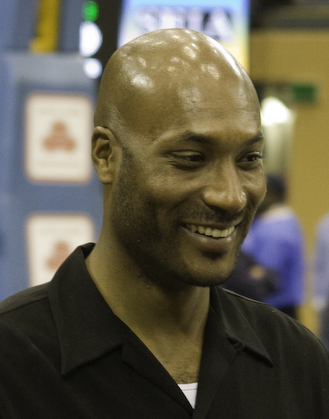
Ed O'Bannon, MOP of the 1995 Championship team

- February 26, 1995 – Ed O'Bannon had 37 points in UCLA's win over Duke, 100–77 at Pauley Pavilion.
- March 19, 1995 – Tyus Edney scored a full-court dash basket for a win over Missouri with 4.8 seconds remaining in the second-round game of the NCAA championship tournament.
- April 3, 1995 – Ed O'Bannon scored 30 points and grabbed 17 rebounds and is named the tournament's Most Outstanding Player as the Bruins win the championship 89–78 over Arkansas. Cameron Dollar played 36 minutes and contributed eight assists and four steals while filling in for an injured Edney, who did not return after leaving with 17:23 left in the first half. The Bruins enjoyed the biggest lead 34–26 in the first half, but led only by a point at halftime 40–39.

== Awards and honors ==
- Jim Harrick, Naismith College Coach of the Year
- Ed O'Bannon, NCAA Men's MOP Award, John R. Wooden Award, consensus first-team All-American

== Team players drafted in the NBA ==
Year	Round	Pick	Player	NBA Team
1995	1	9	Ed O'Bannon	New Jersey Nets
1995	1	22	George Zidek	Charlotte Hornets
1995	2	18	Tyus Edney	Sacramento Kings
1997	2	32	Charles O'Bannon	Detroit Pistons
1998	2	45	Toby Bailey	Los Angeles Lakers
1998	2	56	J.R. Henderson	Vancouver Grizzlies
