= 1994–95 Southern Miss Golden Eagles basketball team =

American college basketball season

1994–95 Southern Miss Golden Eagles men's basketball

NIT, First Round
- Conference: Metro Conference (1975–1995)
- Record: 17–13 (6–6 Metro)
- Head coach: M. K. Turk (19th season)
- Home arena: Reed Green Coliseum

1994–95 Metro Conference men's basketball standings
	Conf.				Overall
Team	W		L	PCT	W		L	PCT
UNC Charlotte	8	–	4	.667	19	–	9	.679
Tulane	7	–	5	.583	23	–	10	.697
Louisville †	7	–	5	.583	19	–	14	.576
Virginia Tech	6	–	6	.500	25	–	10	.714
Southern Miss	6	–	6	.500	17	–	13	.567
South Florida	5	–	7	.417	18	–	12	.600
VCU	3	–	9	.250	16	–	14	.533
† 1995 Metro Conference tournament winner Rankings from AP Poll

The 1994–95 Southern Miss Golden Eagles basketball team represented University of Southern Mississippi in the 1994–95 college basketball season.

== Roster ==
1994–95 Southern Miss Golden Eagles men's basketball team
Players
Coaches

Pos.	#	Name	Height	Weight	Year	Hometown
C		Glen Whisby	6 ft 9 in (2.06 m)	—	Sr	Brookhaven, Mississippi
G		Damien Smith	5 ft 10 in (1.78 m)	—	So
F		Kelly McCarty	6 ft 7 in (2.01 m)	—	Fr	Quitman, Mississippi
F		Fred Williams	6 ft 7 in (2.01 m)	—	Sr
F		George Scott	6 ft 4 in (1.93 m)	—	So
F		Maurice Morris	6 ft 4 in (1.93 m)	—	Sr
G		Sam Jones	6 ft 4 in (1.93 m)	—	Jr
F		Mike Jones	6 ft 5 in (1.96 m)	—	So
G		Avery Thomas	6 ft 1 in (1.85 m)	—	Sr
G		Jimmie Floyd	6 ft 4 in (1.93 m)	—	Fr
F		Rod Agee	6 ft 5 in (1.96 m)	—	Fr
F		Damen Roberts	6 ft 7 in (2.01 m)	—	Fr
F		Steve Anderson	6 ft 9 in (2.06 m)	—	Jr
C		Ross Dorr	6 ft 9 in (2.06 m)	—	Fr

Head coach

- M. K. Turk

Assistant coach(es)

Legend

- (C) Team captain
- (S) Suspended
- (I) Ineligible
- (W) Walk-on
- Injured
- Current redshirt

Roster

== Schedule and results ==
Date time, TV	Rank^{#}	Opponent^{#}	Result	Record	Site city, state
Non-conference regular season
Nov 29, 1994*		Chattanooga	W 68–63	1–0	Reed Green Coliseum; Hattiesburg, Mississippi
Dec 2, 1994*		vs. Idaho State; Ameritas Classic	L 76–79	1–1	Bob Devaney Sports Center; Lincoln, Nebraska
Dec 3, 1994*		vs. Morehead State; Ameritas Classic	L 77–86	1–2	Bob Devaney Sports Center; Lincoln, Nebraska
Dec 10, 1994*		Florida Tech	W 88–73	2–2	Reed Green Coliseum; Hattiesburg, Mississippi
Dec 17, 1994*		vs. Mississippi State; Cellular South Shootout	W 66–64	3–2	Mississippi Coast Coliseum; Biloxi, Mississippi
Dec 20, 1994*		at Northeast Louisiana	W 77–56	4–2	Fant–Ewing Coliseum; Monroe, Louisiana
Dec 22, 1994*		Ole Miss	W 76–69	5–2	Reed Green Coliseum; Hattiesburg, Mississippi
Dec 29, 1994*		Southeastern Louisiana	W 89–62	6–2	Reed Green Coliseum; Hattiesburg, Mississippi
Metro Conference regular season
Jan 7, 1995		Virginia Tech	L 72–87	6–3 (0–1)	Reed Green Coliseum; Hattiesburg, Mississippi
Jan 10, 1995*		at Southwestern Louisiana	W 85–78	7–3	Cajundome; Lafayette, Louisiana
Jan 14, 1995		at Louisville	W 74–72	8–3 (1–1)	Freedom Hall; Louisville, Kentucky
Jan 17, 1995*		at Memphis	L 71–81	8–4	Pyramid Arena; Memphis, Tennessee
Jan 19, 1995*		South Alabama	W 100–76	9–4	Reed Green Coliseum; Hattiesburg, Mississippi
Jan 21, 1995		at UNC Charlotte	L 68–72	9–5 (1–2)	Charlotte Coliseum; Charlotte, North Carolina
Jan 23, 1995*		Northeast Louisiana	W 78–64	10–5	Reed Green Coliseum; Hattiesburg, Mississippi
Jan 28, 1995		Tulane	W 79–55	11–5 (2–2)	Reed Green Coliseum; Hattiesburg, Mississippi
Feb 2, 1995		at Virginia Tech	L 61–76	11–6 (2–3)	Cassell Coliseum; Blacksburg, Virginia
Feb 4, 1995		at VCU	W 74–66	12–6 (3–3)	Richmond Coliseum; Richmond, Virginia
Feb 7, 1995*		at No. 23 Alabama	L 60–65	12–7	Coleman Coliseum; Tuscaloosa, Alabama
Feb 9, 1995		UNC Charlotte	L 59–64	12–8 (3–4)	Reed Green Coliseum; Hattiesburg, Mississippi
Feb 11, 1995		VCU	W 78–69	13–8 (4–4)	Reed Green Coliseum; Hattiesburg, Mississippi
Feb 16, 1995		Louisville	W 74–63	14–8 (5–4)	Reed Green Coliseum; Hattiesburg, Mississippi
Feb 18, 1995		South Florida	W 77–75	15–8 (6–4)	Reed Green Coliseum; Hattiesburg, Mississippi
Feb 22, 1995*		Auburn	L 79–81	15–9	Reed Green Coliseum; Hattiesburg, Mississippi
Mar 2, 1995		at South Florida	L 66–80	15–10 (6–5)	USF Sun Dome; Tampa, Florida
Mar 4, 1995		at Tulane	L 75–89	15–11 (6–6)	Avron B. Fogelman Arena; New Orleans, Louisiana
Metro Conference tournament
Mar 10, 1995*	(5)	vs. (4) Virginia Tech; First round	W 82–66	16–11	Freedom Hall; Louisville, Kentucky
Mar 11, 1995*	(5)	vs. (1) UNC Charlotte; Semifinals	W 60–56	17–11	Freedom Hall; Louisville, Kentucky
Mar 12, 1995*	(5)	at (2) Louisville; Championship	L 64–78	17–12	Freedom Hall; Louisville, Kentucky
NIT
Mar 16, 1995*		at St. Bonaventure; First round	L 70–75	17–13	Reilly Center; Olean, New York
*Non-conference game. ^{#}Rankings from AP poll. (#) Tournament seedings in parentheses. All times are in Central Time.
