= 1994–95 Virginia Tech Hokies men's basketball team =

American college basketball season

1994–95 Virginia Tech Hokies men's basketball

NIT Champions
- Conference: Metro Conference (1975–1995)
- Record: 25–10 (6–6 Metro)
- Head coach: Bill Foster (4th season)
- Home arena: Cassell Coliseum

1994–95 Metro Conference men's basketball standings
| | Conf. | | | | Overall |
| Team | W | | L | PCT | W | | L | PCT |
|---|---|---|---|---|---|---|---|---|
| UNC Charlotte | 8 | – | 4 | .667 | 19 | – | 9 | .679 |
| Tulane | 7 | – | 5 | .583 | 23 | – | 10 | .697 |
| Louisville † | 7 | – | 5 | .583 | 19 | – | 14 | .576 |
| Virginia Tech | 6 | – | 6 | .500 | 25 | – | 10 | .714 |
| Southern Miss | 6 | – | 6 | .500 | 17 | – | 13 | .567 |
| South Florida | 5 | – | 7 | .417 | 18 | – | 12 | .600 |
| VCU | 3 | – | 9 | .250 | 16 | – | 14 | .533 |
† 1995 Metro Conference tournament winner Rankings from AP Poll

The 1994–95 Virginia Tech Hokies men's basketball team represented Virginia Polytechnic Institute and State University from Blacksburg, Virginia in the 1994-95 season.

In their last season in the Metro Conference, the Hokies finished with a conference record of 6–6, tied for fourth in the conference play.

== Schedule and results ==
| Date time, TV | Rank^{#} | Opponent^{#} | Result | Record | Site city, state |
Non-conference regular season
| Nov 25, 1994* | | vs. Montana State; San Juan Shootout | W 69–62 | 1–0 | Roberto Clemente Coliseum; San Juan, Puerto Rico |
| Nov 26, 1994* | | vs. Nebraska; San Juan Shootout | W 87–81 | 2–0 | Roberto Clemente Coliseum; San Juan, Puerto Rico |
| Nov 27, 1994* | | vs. Illinois; San Juan Shootout | L 75–85 | 2–1 | Roberto Clemente Coliseum (500); San Juan, Puerto Rico |
| Dec 3, 1994* | | William & Mary | W 77–53 | 3–1 | Cassell Coliseum; Blacksburg, Virginia |
| Dec 5, 1994* | | Xavier | W 82–55 | 4–1 | Cassell Coliseum; Blacksburg, Virginia |
| Dec 7, 1994* | | VMI | W 110–75 | 5–1 | Cassell Coliseum; Blacksburg, Virginia |
| Dec 10, 1994* | | TCU | W 77–53 | 6–1 | Cassell Coliseum; Blacksburg, Virginia |
| Dec 17, 1994* | | at West Virginia | W 83–73 | 7–1 | WVU Coliseum; Morgantown, West Virginia |
| Dec 19, 1994* | | East Tennessee State | W 86–64 | 8–1 | Cassell Coliseum; Blacksburg, Virginia |
| Dec 28, 1994* | | at Tennessee | W 73–64 | 9–1 | Thompson–Boling Arena; Knoxville, Tennessee |
| Dec 31, 1994* | | Delaware State | W 68–53 | 10–1 | Cassell Coliseum; Blacksburg, Virginia |
Metro Conference regular season
| Jan 5, 1995 | | at Tulane | L 72–78 | 10–2 (0–1) | Avron B. Fogelman Arena; New Orleans, Louisiana |
| Jan 7, 1995 | | at Southern Miss | W 87–72 | 11–2 (1–1) | Reed Green Coliseum; Hattiesburg, Mississippi |
| Jan 12, 1995 | | Louisville | L 61–62 | 11–3 (1–2) | Cassell Coliseum; Blacksburg, Virginia |
| Jan 14, 1995 | | VCU | W 78–69 | 12–3 (2–2) | Cassell Coliseum; Blacksburg, Virginia |
| Jan 17, 1995 | | at Marquette | W 57–54 | 13–3 | Bradley Center; Milwaukee, Wisconsin |
| Jan 21, 1995* | | vs. North Carolina | L 76–87 | 13–4 | Greensboro Coliseum; Greensboro, North Carolina |
| Jan 25, 1995 | | at Louisville | L 74–78 | 13–5 (2–3) | Freedom Hall; Louisville, Kentucky |
| Jan 28, 1995* | | at Liberty | W 101–70 | 14–5 | Vines Center; Lynchburg, Virginia |
| Feb 2, 1995 | | Southern Miss | W 76–61 | 15–5 (3–3) | Cassell Coliseum; Blacksburg, Virginia |
| Feb 4, 1995* | | Florida Atlantic | W 79–35 | 16–5 | Cassell Coliseum; Blacksburg, Virginia |
| Feb 7, 1995* | | at Wright State | W 77–74 | 17–5 | Nutter Center; Fairborn, Ohio |
| Feb 11, 1995 | | at South Florida | L 66–68 | 17–6 (3–4) | USF Sun Dome; Tampa, Florida |
| Feb 16, 1995 | | at UNC Charlotte | L 60–71 | 17–7 (3–5) | Charlotte Coliseum; Charlotte, North Carolina |
| Feb 18, 1995 | | Tulane | W 70–66 | 18–7 (4–5) | Cassell Coliseum; Blacksburg, Virginia |
| Feb 23, 1995 | | at VCU | L 57–62 | 18–8 (4–6) | Richmond Coliseum; Richmond, Virginia |
| Feb 25, 1995 | | South Florida | W 74–64 | 19–8 (5–6) | Cassell Coliseum; Blacksburg, Virginia |
| Feb 28, 1995* | | at No. 13 Virginia | L 62–63 | 19–9 | Richmond Coliseum; Richmond, Virginia |
| Mar 4, 1995 | | UNC Charlotte | W 86–72 | 20–9 (6–6) | Cassell Coliseum; Blacksburg, Virginia |
Metro Conference tournament
| Mar 10, 1995* | (4) | vs. (5) Southern Miss; First round | L 66–82 | 20–10 | Freedom Hall; Louisville, Kentucky |
NIT tournament
| Mar 17, 1995* | | Clemson; First round | W 62–54 | 21–10 | Cassell Coliseum; Blacksburg, Virginia |
| Mar 20, 1995* | | at Providence; Second round | W 91–78 | 22–10 | Amica Mutual Pavilion; Providence, Rhode Island |
| Mar 22, 1995* | | at New Mexico State; Quarterfinals | W 64–61 | 23–10 | Cassell Coliseum; Blacksburg, Virginia |
| Mar 27, 1995* | | vs. Canisius; Semifinals | W 71–59 | 24–10 | Madison Square Garden; New York, New York |
| Mar 29, 1995* | | vs. Marquette; Finals | W 65–64 | 25–10 | Madison Square Garden; New York, New York |
*Non-conference game. ^{#}Rankings from AP Poll. (#) Tournament seedings in parentheses. All times are in Eastern Time.
