= 1994–95 Tulane Green Wave men's basketball team =

American college basketball season

1994–95 Tulane Green Wave men's basketball

NCAA tournament, second round
- Conference: Metro Conference (1975–1995)
- Record: 23–10 (7–5 Metro)
- Head coach: Perry Clark (6th season)
- Assistant coach: Greg Gary (3rd season)
- Home arena: Devlin Fieldhouse

1994–95 Metro Conference men's basketball standings
	Conf.				Overall
Team	W		L	PCT	W		L	PCT
UNC Charlotte	8	–	4	.667	19	–	9	.679
Tulane	7	–	5	.583	23	–	10	.697
Louisville †	7	–	5	.583	19	–	14	.576
Virginia Tech	6	–	6	.500	25	–	10	.714
Southern Miss	6	–	6	.500	17	–	13	.567
South Florida	5	–	7	.417	18	–	12	.600
VCU	3	–	9	.250	16	–	14	.533
† 1995 Metro Conference tournament winner Rankings from AP Poll

The 1994–95 Tulane Green Wave men's basketball team represented Tulane University in the 1994–95 college basketball season. This was head coach Perry Clark's sixth season at Tulane. The Green Wave competed in the Metro Conference and played their home games at Devlin Fieldhouse. They finished the season 23–10 (7–5 in Metro play) and finished second in the conference regular season standings. Tulane lost in the quarterfinal round of the Metro Conference tournament, but received an at-large bid to the 1995 NCAA tournament. The Green Wave defeated Brigham Young in the opening round before losing to No. 1 seed Kentucky in the round of 32.

This season marked the school's third NCAA Tournament appearance in a 4-year span, with Tulane reaching the second round each time. To date, this season is Tulane's most recent appearance in the NCAA Tournament.

== Roster ==
1992–93 Tulane Green Wave men's basketball team
Players
Coaches

Pos.	#	Name	Height	Weight	Year	Hometown
F	0	Rayshard Allen	6 ft 7 in (2.01 m)	—	So
F	40	Jerald Honeycutt	6 ft 9 in (2.06 m)	235 lb (107 kg)	So	Grambling, Louisiana

Head coach

- Perry Clark

Assistant coach(es)

- Greg Gary

Legend

- (C) Team captain
- (S) Suspended
- (I) Ineligible
- (W) Walk-on
- Injured
- Current redshirt

== Schedule and results ==
Date time, TV	Rank^{#}	Opponent^{#}	Result	Record	Site city, state
Regular season
Nov 21, 1994*		vs. No. 13 Michigan; Maui Invitational	L 73–75	0–1	Lahaina Civic Center; Lahaina, HI
Nov 22, 1994*		vs. Texas A&M; Maui Invitational	W 76–74	1–1	Lahaina Civic Center; Lahaina, HI
Nov 23, 1994*		vs. No. 11 Indiana; Maui Invitational	W 86–68	2–1	Lahaina Civic Center; Lahaina, HI
Dec 3, 1994*		Prairie View A&M	W 122–58	3–1	Avron B. Fogelman Arena; New Orleans, LA
Dec 5, 1994*		Old Dominion	W 85–80	4–1	Avron B. Fogelman Arena; New Orleans, LA
Dec 7, 1994*		UT Arlington	W 80–70	5–1	Avron B. Fogelman Arena; New Orleans, LA
Dec 10, 1994*		at Florida State	L 74–81	5–2	Tallahassee-Leon County Civic Center; Tallahassee, FL
Dec 17, 1994*		vs. Ole Miss	W 71–62	6–2	Mississippi Coast Coliseum; Biloxi, MS
Dec 22, 1994*		Alabama	W 72–68	7–2	Avron B. Fogelman Arena; New Orleans, LA
Dec 28, 1994*		Bethune–Cookman	W 97–66	8–2	Avron B. Fogelman Arena; New Orleans, LA
Dec 30, 1994*		UNC Wilmington	W 75–65	9–2	Avron B. Fogelman Arena; New Orleans, LA
Jan 2, 1995*		Drake	W 86–72	10–2	Avron B. Fogelman Arena; New Orleans, LA
Jan 5, 1995		Virginia Tech	W 78–72	11–2 (1–0)	Avron B. Fogelman Arena; New Orleans, LA
Jan 7, 1995*		Florida Atlantic	W 86–74	12–2	Avron B. Fogelman Arena; New Orleans, LA
Jan 10, 1995*		vs. New Orleans	W 75–71	13–2	Louisiana Superdome; New Orleans, LA
Jan 14, 1995*		at Cincinnati	L 72–86	13–3	Myrl H. Shoemaker Center; Cincinnati, OH
Jan 21, 1995		Louisville	W 76–73	14–3 (2–0)	Avron B. Fogelman Arena; New Orleans, LA
Jan 26, 1995*		Sacramento State	W 85–73	15–3	Avron B. Fogelman Arena; New Orleans, LA
Jan 28, 1995		at Southern Miss	L 55–79	15–4 (2–1)	Reed Green Coliseum; Hattiesburg, MS
Feb 2, 1995		at UNC Charlotte	W 81–59	16–4 (3–1)	Independence Arena; Charlotte, NC
Feb 4, 1995		at Louisville	L 56–71	16–5 (3–2)	Freedom Hall; Louisville, KY
Feb 8, 1995		VCU	W 79–64	17–5 (4–2)	Avron B. Fogelman Arena; New Orleans, LA
Feb 11, 1995		UNC Charlotte	L 63–76	17–6 (4–3)	Avron B. Fogelman Arena; New Orleans, LA
Feb 16, 1995		South Florida	W 78–61	18–6 (5–3)	Avron B. Fogelman Arena; New Orleans, LA
Feb 18, 1995		at Virginia Tech	L 66–70	18–7 (5–4)	Cassell Coliseum; Blacksburg, VA
Feb 20, 1995*		Centenary (LA)	W 83–65	19–7	Avron B. Fogelman Arena; New Orleans, LA
Feb 23, 1995		at South Florida	L 64–97	19–8 (5–5)	USF Sun Dome; Tampa, FL
Feb 25, 1995		at VCU	W 74–59	20–8 (6–5)	Richmond Coliseum; Richmond, VA
Mar 4, 1995		Southern Miss	W 89–75	21–8 (7–5)	Avron B. Fogelman Arena; New Orleans, LA
Metro tournament
Mar 10, 1995*	(3)	vs. (6) South Florida; First Round	W 73–64	22–8	Freedom Hall; Louisville, KY
Mar 11, 1995*	(3)	at (2) Louisville; Semifinals	L 80–81 ^{OT}	22–9	Freedom Hall; Louisville, KY
NCAA tournament
Mar 16, 1995*	(9 SE)	vs. (8 SE) BYU; First Round	W 76–70	23–9	Pyramid Arena; Memphis, Tennessee
Mar 18, 1995*	(9 SE)	vs. (1 SE) No. 2 Kentucky; Second Round	L 60–82	23–10	Pyramid Arena; Memphis, Tennessee
*Non-conference game. ^{#}Rankings from AP Poll. (#) Tournament seedings in parentheses.
