= 1994–95 Missouri Tigers men's basketball team =

American college basketball season

1994–95 Missouri Tigers men's basketball

NCAA tournament, Second round
- Conference: Big Eight Conference

Ranking
- Coaches: No. 18
- AP: No. 23
- Record: 20–9 (8–6 Big 8)
- Head coach: Norm Stewart (28th season)
- Assistant coaches: Kim Anderson (4th season); Rich Daly (12th season); Lee Winfield (3rd season)
- Captain: Lamont Frazier
- Home arena: Hearnes Center

1994–95 Big Eight Conference men's basketball standings
	Conf.				Overall
Team	W		L	PCT	W		L	PCT
No. 5 Kansas	11	–	3	.786	25	–	6	.806
No. 14 Oklahoma State †	10	–	4	.714	27	–	10	.730
No. 17 Oklahoma	9	–	5	.643	23	–	9	.719
No. 23 Missouri	8	–	6	.571	20	–	9	.690
Iowa State	6	–	8	.429	23	–	11	.676
Colorado	5	–	9	.357	15	–	13	.536
Nebraska	4	–	10	.286	18	–	14	.563
Kansas State	3	–	11	.214	12	–	15	.444
† 1995 Big Eight tournament winner As of April 4, 1995; Rankings from AP poll

The 1994–95 Missouri Tigers men's basketball team represented the University of Missouri as a member of the Big Eight Conference during the 1994–95 NCAA men's basketball season. Led by head coach Norm Stewart, the Tigers finished fourth in the Big Eight Conference regular season standings. Though upset by Iowa State in the Big Eight tournament quarterfinals, the Tigers were awarded the No.8 seed in the West region of the NCAA tournament. After defeating 9th-seeded Indiana in the opening round, this Missouri team will be remembered for almost knocking off No.1 overall seed, and eventual National champion, UCLA were it not for a Tyus Edney coast-to-coast layup that dropped through at the buzzer. Missouri finished with an overall record of 20–9 (8–6 Big Eight).

== Roster ==
1994–95 Missouri Tigers men's basketball team
Players
Coaches

Pos.	#	Name	Height	Weight	Year	Hometown
G	13	Julian Winfield	6 ft 4 in (1.93 m)	185 lb (84 kg)	Jr
G		Troy Hudson	6 ft 1 in (1.85 m)	—	Fr
G	23	Paul O'Liney	6 ft 2 in (1.88 m)	—	Sr
F	33	Kelly Thames (injured) (redshirt)	6 ft 8 in (2.03 m)	—	So
F	42	Derek Grimm	6 ft 9 in (2.06 m)	—	So

Head coach

- Norm Stewart (Missouri)

Assistant coach(es)

- Kim Anderson (Missouri)
- Rich Daly
- Lee Winfield (North Texas)

Legend

- (C) Team captain
- (S) Suspended
- (I) Ineligible
- (W) Walk-on
- Injured
- Current redshirt

Roster

== Schedule and results ==
Date time, TV	Rank^{#}	Opponent^{#}	Result	Record	Site (attendance) city, state
Non-conference regular season
Nov 26, 1994*		Chicago State	W 106–72	1–0	Hearnes Center; Columbia, Missouri
Nov 30, 1994*		vs. Purdue	W 69–66	2–0	Palace of Auburn Hills; Auburn Hills, Michigan
Dec 3, 1994*		No. 4 Arkansas	L 71–94	2–1	Hearnes Center; Columbia, Missouri
Dec 6, 1994*		Southeast Missouri State	W 84–77	3–1	Hearnes Center; Columbia, Missouri
Dec 8, 1994*		Coppin State	W 90–62	4–1	Hearnes Center; Columbia, Missouri
Dec 17, 1994*		Mercer	W 74–73	5–1	Hearnes Center; Columbia, Missouri
Dec 19, 1994*		Liberty	W 87–76	6–1	Hearnes Center; Columbia, Missouri
Dec 22, 1994*		vs. No. 23 Illinois; Braggin' Rights	W 76–58	7–1	Kiel Center; St. Louis, Missouri
Jan 2, 1995*		at Washington	W 71–61	8–1	Hec Edmundson Pavilion; Seattle, Washington
Jan 4, 1995*		at SMU	W 84–68	9–1	Moody Coliseum; Dallas, Texas
Big Eight regular season
Jan 7, 1995		at No. 19 Nebraska	W 82–74	10–1 (1–0)	Bob Devaney Sports Center; Lincoln, Nebraska
Jan 9, 1995	No. 17	No. 3 Kansas; Border War	L 89–102	10–2 (1–1)	Hearnes Center; Columbia, Missouri
Jan 12, 1995*	No. 17	Notre Dame	W 64–56	11–2	Hearnes Center; Columbia, Missouri
Jan 14, 1995		Kansas State	W 67–61	12–2 (2–1)	Hearnes Center; Columbia, Missouri
Jan 18, 1995*		at Jackson State	W 86–72	13–2	Williams Assembly Center; Jackson, Mississippi
Jan 22, 1995		at Oklahoma State	L 70–85	13–3 (2–2)	Gallagher-Iba Arena; Stillwater, Oklahoma
Jan 25, 1995		Colorado	W 85–80	14–3 (3–2)	Hearnes Center; Columbia, Missouri
Jan 30, 1995		at No. 11 Iowa State	W 80–71	15–3 (4–2)	Hilton Coliseum; Ames, Iowa
Feb 4, 1995		at Kansas State	W 77–60	16–3 (5–2)	Bramlage Coliseum; Manhattan, Kansas
Feb 8, 1995		No. 19 Iowa State	W 59–56	17–3 (6–2)	Hearnes Center; Columbia, Missouri
Feb 11, 1995		No. 24 Oklahoma State	W 81–79	18–3 (7–2)	Hearnes Center; Columbia, Missouri
Feb 18, 1995		at Oklahoma	L 89–94	18–4 (7–3)	Lloyd Noble Center; Norman, Oklahoma
Feb 22, 1995		Nebraska	L 75–78	18–5 (7–4)	Hearnes Center; Columbia, Missouri
Feb 25, 1995		at No. 1 Kansas	L 69–88	18–6 (7–5)	Allen Fieldhouse; Lawrence, Kansas
Mar 1, 1995	No. 19	at Colorado	L 76–81	18–7 (7–6)	Coors Events Center; Boulder, Colorado
Mar 4, 1995	No. 19	No. 16 Oklahoma	W 83–81 ^{OT}	19–7 (8–6)	Hearnes Center; Columbia, Missouri
Big Eight tournament
Mar 10, 1995*	No. 17	vs. Iowa State; Quarterfinals	L 50–68	19–8	Kemper Arena; Kansas City, Missouri
NCAA Tournament
Mar 17, 1995*	(8 W) No. 23	vs. (9 W) Indiana; First round	W 65–60	20–8	BSU Pavilion; Boise, Idaho
Mar 19, 1995*	(8 W) No. 23	vs. (1 W) No. 1 UCLA; Second round	L 74–75	20–9	BSU Pavilion; Boise, Idaho
*Non-conference game. ^{#}Rankings from AP. (#) Tournament seedings in parentheses. W=West. All times are in Central.
