= 1995 Metro Conference men's basketball tournament =

- Classification: Division I
- Season: 1994–95
- Teams: 7
- Site: Freedom Hall; Louisville, FY
- Champions: Louisville (11th title)
- Winning coach: Denny Crum (11th title)
- MVP: DeJuan Wheat (Louisville)

1994–95 Metro Conference men's basketball standings
	Conf.				Overall
Team	W		L	PCT	W		L	PCT
UNC Charlotte	8	–	4	.667	19	–	9	.679
Tulane	7	–	5	.583	23	–	10	.697
Louisville †	7	–	5	.583	19	–	14	.576
Virginia Tech	6	–	6	.500	25	–	10	.714
Southern Miss	6	–	6	.500	17	–	13	.567
South Florida	5	–	7	.417	18	–	12	.600
VCU	3	–	9	.250	16	–	14	.533
† 1995 Metro Conference tournament winner Rankings from AP Poll

The 1995 Metro Conference men's basketball tournament was held March 10–12 at Freedom Hall in Louisville, Kentucky.

Louisville defeated Southern Miss in the championship game, 78–64, to win their 11th Metro men's basketball tournament. The Cardinals received an automatic bid to the 1995 NCAA tournament.

This was the final Metro Conference men's basketball tournament, as five members of the Metro Conference and six members of the Great Midwest Conference joined to form Conference USA. The inaugural Conference USA men's basketball tournament was played March 7–9, 1996.

== Format ==
All seven of the conference's members participated. They were seeded based on regular season conference records, with the top team earning a bye into the semifinal round. The other six teams entered into the preliminary first round.

== Bracket ==
First round Friday, March 10
4	Virginia Tech	66
5	Southern Miss	82
6	South Florida	64
3	Tulane	73
7	VCU	61
2	Louisville	84

Semifinals; Saturday, March 11
1	UNC Charlotte	56
5	Southern Miss	60
3	Tulane	80
2	Louisville	81

Championship; Sunday, March 12
5	Southern Miss	64
2	Louisville	78
