= 1994 Maui Invitational =

1994 Maui Invitational Tournament
- Season: 1994–95
- Teams: 8
- Finals site: Lahaina Civic Center; Maui, Hawaii
- Champions: Arizona State (1st title)
- Runner-up: Maryland (1st title game)
- Semifinalists: Utah Utes; Michigan
- Winning coach: Bill Frieder (3rd title)
- MVP: Mario Bennett (Arizona State)

The 1994 Maui Invitational Tournament was an early-season college basketball tournament that was played, for the 11th time, from November 21 to November 23, 1994. The tournament, which began in 1984, was part of the 1994-95 NCAA Division I men's basketball season. The tournament was played at the Lahaina Civic Center in Maui, Hawaii and was won by the Arizona State Sun Devils. It was the first title for the program and the third title for its head coach Bill Frieder.

== Bracket ==
5th place game November 23
11	Indiana	68
Tulane	86
7th place game
Chaminade	52
Texas A&M	73

Consolation 2nd Round; November 22
Chaminade	79
11	Indiana	92
Tulane	76
Texas A&M	74

First Round; November 21
Chaminade	67
7	Maryland	95
Utah	77
11	Indiana	72
13	Michigan	75
Tulane	73
Arizona State	103
Texas A&M	73

Semifinals; November 22
7	Maryland	90
Utah	78
13	Michigan	72
Arizona State	79

Championship; November 23
7	Maryland	90
Arizona State	97
3rd place game
Utah	69
13	Michigan	73
