= 1994–95 UNC Charlotte 49ers men's basketball team =

American college basketball season

1994–95 Charlotte 49ers men's basketball
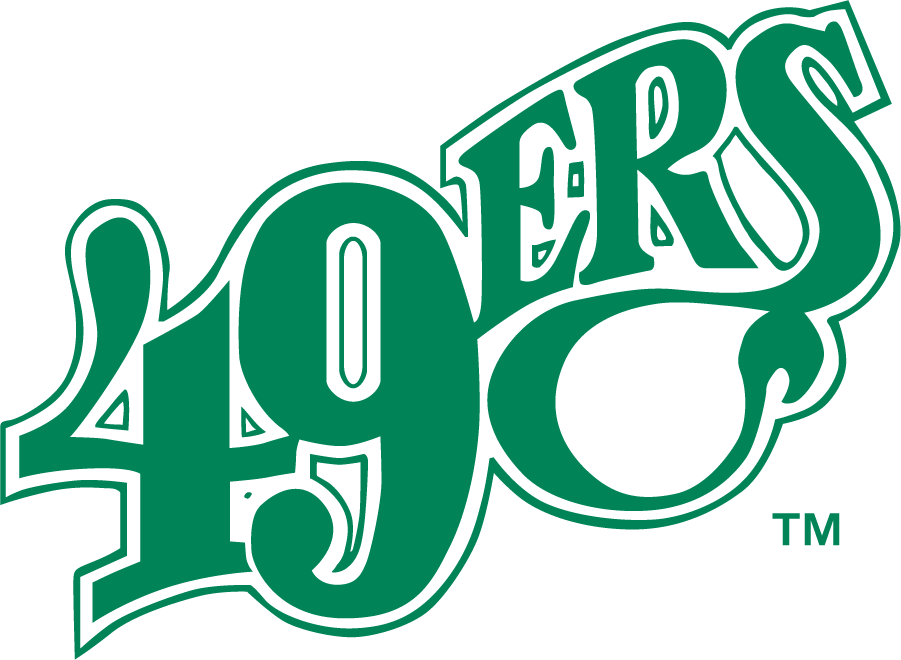

Metro Conference Regular Season champion

NCAA tournament
- Conference: Metro Conference (1975–1995)
- Record: 19–9 (8–4 Metro)
- Head coach: Jeff Mullins (10th season)
- Home arena: Charlotte Coliseum; Belk Gymnasium (alternate)

1994–95 Metro Conference men's basketball standings
	Conf.				Overall
Team	W		L	PCT	W		L	PCT
UNC Charlotte	8	–	4	.667	19	–	9	.679
Tulane	7	–	5	.583	23	–	10	.697
Louisville †	7	–	5	.583	19	–	14	.576
Virginia Tech	6	–	6	.500	25	–	10	.714
Southern Miss	6	–	6	.500	17	–	13	.567
South Florida	5	–	7	.417	18	–	12	.600
VCU	3	–	9	.250	16	–	14	.533
† 1995 Metro Conference tournament winner Rankings from AP Poll

The 1994–95 Charlotte 49ers men's basketball team represented the University of North Carolina at Charlotte in the 1994–95 college basketball season. This was head coach Jeff Mullins's tenth season at Charlotte. The 49ers competed in the Metro Conference and played their home games at Dale F. Halton Arena. They finished the season 19–9 (8–4 in Metro play) and won the Metro Conference regular season championship to receive a bid to the 1995 NCAA tournament. The 49ers lost in the opening round to Stanford.

== Roster ==
1994–95 Charlotte 49ers men's basketball team
Players
Coaches

Pos.	#	Name	Height	Weight	Year	Previous school	Hometown
F	4	DeMarco Johnson	6 ft 9 in (2.06 m)	250 lb (113 kg)	Fr	Fork Union	Charlotte, North Carolina
F	5	Quincy Alexander	6 ft 8 in (2.03 m)	210 lb (95 kg)	Jr	Dunbar	Fort Worth, Texas
G	11	Robert Price	5 ft 11 in (1.8 m)	190 lb (86 kg)	Jr	St. James School	Washington, D.C.
C	13	Jason Dominick	6 ft 10 in (2.08 m)	235 lb (107 kg)	So	Manchester	Manchester, Michigan
G/F	21	Bruce Patterson	6 ft 4 in (1.93 m)	215 lb (98 kg)	Jr	Langley	Pittsburgh, Pennsylvania
F	23	Jarvis Lang	6 ft 7 in (2.01 m)	240 lb (109 kg)	Sr	Farmville Central	Farmville, North Carolina
G	24	Ponce James	6 ft 2 in (1.88 m)	190 lb (86 kg)	Jr	Warren Harding	Bridgeport, Connecticut
F	25	Roy Wells	6 ft 6 in (1.98 m)	190 lb (86 kg)	Jr	Wichita Heights	Wichita, Kansas
G/F	31	Bobby Kummer	6 ft 6 in (1.98 m)	225 lb (102 kg)	Jr	Detroit Catholic Central	Livonia, Michigan
G	35	Shanderic Downs	6 ft 5 in (1.96 m)	215 lb (98 kg)	So	Wossman	Monroe, Louisiana
G	50	Roderick Howard	5 ft 10 in (1.78 m)	185 lb (84 kg)	So	Ashbrook	Gastonia, North Carolina
C	54	Jermaine Parker	7 ft 0 in (2.13 m)	235 lb (107 kg)	Sr	Sanderson	Raleigh, North Carolina
F	55	Pino Pipes	6 ft 7 in (2.01 m)	240 lb (109 kg)	So	New Albany	New Albany, Indiana

Head coach

- Jeff Mullins

Assistant coach(es)

Legend

- (C) Team captain
- (S) Suspended
- (I) Ineligible
- (W) Walk-on
- Injured
- Current redshirt

== Schedule and results ==
Date time, TV	Rank^{#}	Opponent^{#}	Result	Record	Site city, state
Regular season
Dec 1, 1994*		Coastal Carolina	W 101–72	1–0	Independence Arena; Charlotte, North Carolina
Dec 3, 1994*		at Duquesne	W 79–70	2–0	A.J. Palumbo Center; Pittsburgh, Pennsylvania
Dec 5, 1994*		at Furman	W 70–52	3–0	Memorial Auditorium; Greenville, South Carolina
Dec 10, 1994*		Southern Illinois	W 76–70	4–0	Independence Arena; Charlotte, North Carolina
Dec 17, 1994*		at Davidson	L 55–66	4–1	Belk Arena; Davidson, North Carolina
Dec 20, 1994*		Appalachian State	W 92–68	5–1	Independence Arena; Charlotte, North Carolina
Dec 28, 1994*		vs. Brown; Jones Intercable Lobo Invitational	W 76–53	6–1	University Arena; Albuquerque, New Mexico
Dec 29, 1994*		at New Mexico; Jones Intercable Lobo Invitational	W 78–75 ^{OT}	7–1	University Arena; Albuquerque, New Mexico
Jan 5, 1995*		Canisius	L 71–74	7–2	Independence Arena; Charlotte, North Carolina
Jan 7, 1995*		George Washington	W 73–54	8–2	Independence Arena; Charlotte, North Carolina
Jan 12, 1995*		Davidson	W 91–67	9–2	Independence Arena; Charlotte, North Carolina
Jan 14, 1995		at South Florida	W 72–66	10–2 (1–0)	USF Sun Dome; Tampa, Florida
Jan 16, 1995*		UNC Wilmington	W 92–79	11–2	Independence Arena; Charlotte, North Carolina
Jan 19, 1995		Louisville	W 86–82	12–2 (2–0)	Independence Arena; Charlotte, North Carolina
Jan 21, 1995		Southern Miss	W 72–68	13–2 (3–0)	Independence Arena; Charlotte, North Carolina
Jan 26, 1995		at VCU	W 73–47	14–2 (4–0)	Richmond Coliseum; Richmond, Virginia
Jan 28, 1995		at Louisville	L 57–79	14–3 (4–1)	Freedom Hall; Louisville, Kentucky
Feb 2, 1995		Tulane	L 59–81	14–4 (4–2)	Independence Arena; Charlotte, North Carolina
Feb 4, 1995		South Florida	L 69–72	14–5 (4–3)	Independence Arena; Charlotte, North Carolina
Feb 9, 1995		at Southern Miss	W 64–59	15–5 (5–3)	Reed Green Coliseum; Hattiesburg, Mississippi
Feb 11, 1995		at Tulane	W 76–63	16–5 (6–3)	Avron B. Fogelman Arena; New Orleans, Louisiana
Feb 16, 1995		Virginia Tech	W 71–60	17–5 (7–3)	Independence Arena; Charlotte, North Carolina
Feb 18, 1995		VCU	W 84–71	18–5 (8–3)	Independence Arena; Charlotte, North Carolina
Feb 22, 1995*		at East Carolina	L 77–89	18–6	Williams Arena at Minges Coliseum; Greenville, North Carolina
Feb 27, 1995*		at James Madison	W 77–74	19–6	JMU Convocation Center; Harrisonburg, Virginia
Mar 4, 1995		at Virginia Tech	L 72–86	19–7 (8–4)	Cassell Coliseum; Blacksburg, Virginia
Metro Conference tournament
Mar 11, 1995*	(1)	vs. (5) Southern Miss; Semifinals	L 56–60	19–8	Freedom Hall; Louisville, Kentucky
NCAA tournament
Mar 17, 1995*	(7 E)	vs. (10 E) Stanford; First round	L 68–70	19–9	Times Union Center; Albany, New York
*Non-conference game. ^{#}Rankings from AP Poll. (#) Tournament seedings in parentheses. E=East. All times are in Eastern Time. (#) during NCAA is seed within region.
