= 1994–95 Oklahoma Sooners men's basketball team =

American college basketball season

1994–95 Oklahoma Sooners men's basketball

NCAA tournament, First round
- Conference: Big Eight Conference

Ranking
- AP: No. 17
- Record: 23–9 (9–5 Big Eight)
- Head coach: Kelvin Sampson (1st season)
- Home arena: Lloyd Noble Center (Capacity: 10,871)

1994–95 Big Eight Conference men's basketball standings
	Conf.				Overall
Team	W		L	PCT	W		L	PCT
No. 5 Kansas	11	–	3	.786	25	–	6	.806
No. 14 Oklahoma State †	10	–	4	.714	27	–	10	.730
No. 17 Oklahoma	9	–	5	.643	23	–	9	.719
No. 23 Missouri	8	–	6	.571	20	–	9	.690
Iowa State	6	–	8	.429	23	–	11	.676
Colorado	5	–	9	.357	15	–	13	.536
Nebraska	4	–	10	.286	18	–	14	.563
Kansas State	3	–	11	.214	12	–	15	.444
† 1995 Big Eight tournament winner As of April 4, 1995; Rankings from AP poll

The 1994–95 Oklahoma Sooners men's basketball team represented the University of Oklahoma in competitive college basketball during the 1994–95 NCAA Division I men's basketball season. The Oklahoma Sooners men's basketball team played its home games in the Lloyd Noble Center and was a member of the National Collegiate Athletic Association's Big 12 Conference.

The team posted a 23–9 overall record (9–5 Big Eight). The Sooners received a bid to the 1995 NCAA tournament as No. 4 seed in the Southeast region. The Sooners lost to No. 11 seed Manhattan, 77–67, in the opening round.

== Roster ==
1994–95 Oklahoma Sooners men's basketball team
Players	Coaches
Pos. / # / Name / Height / Weight / Year / Hometown; F / 12 / Ryan Minor / 6 ft 7 in (2.01 m) / 215 lb (98 kg) / Jr / Hammon, Oklahoma	Head coach: Kelvin Sampson; Assistant coach(es) Legend: (C) Team captain; (S) Suspended; (I) Ineligible; (W) Walk-on; Injured; Current redshirt; Roster

== Schedule and results ==
Date time, TV	Rank^{#}	Opponent^{#}	Result	Record	Site (attendance) city, state
Non-conference regular season
Nov 26, 1994*		Coppin State	W 85–74	1–0	Lloyd Noble Center; Norman, Oklahoma
Nov 30, 1994*		UC Irvine	W 99–77	2–0	Lloyd Noble Center; Norman, Oklahoma
Dec 3, 1994*		Louisiana-Monroe	W 93–68	3–0	Lloyd Noble Center; Norman, Oklahoma
Dec 6, 1994*		at SMU	W 87–60	4–0	Moody Coliseum; Dallas, Texas
Dec 10, 1994*		Nicholls State	W 89–80	5–0	Lloyd Noble Center; Norman, Oklahoma
Dec 17, 1994*		Jackson State	W 91–70	6–0	Lloyd Noble Center; Norman, Oklahoma
Dec 19, 1994*		Mount St. Mary's	W 91–67	7–0	Lloyd Noble Center; Norman, Oklahoma
Dec 28, 1994*		vs. No. 3 Arkansas	L 84–86	7–1	Stan Sheriff Center; Honolulu, Hawaii
Dec 29, 1994*		vs. No. 17 Georgia Tech	L 85–89	7–2	Stan Sheriff Center; Honolulu, Hawaii
Dec 30, 1994*		vs. Boston University	W 75–70	8–2	Stan Sheriff Center; Honolulu, Hawaii
Jan 3, 1995*		at Baylor	W 77–68	9–2	Ferrell Center; Waco, Texas
Jan 6, 1995*		vs. Alabama State; All-College Tournament	W 97–68	10–2	Myriad Convention Center; Oklahoma City, Oklahoma
Jan 7, 1995*		vs. Tulsa	W 76–61	11–2	Myriad Convention Center; Oklahoma City, Oklahoma
Big Eight Regular Season
Jan 14, 1995		Colorado	W 98–83	12–2 (1–0)	Lloyd Noble Center; Norman, Oklahoma
Jan 16, 1995		at Oklahoma State	L 64–72	12–3 (1–1)	Gallagher-Iba Arena; Stillwater, Oklahoma
Jan 18, 1995*		Oral Roberts	W 87–53	13–3	Lloyd Noble Center; Norman, Oklahoma
Jan 21, 1995*		Texas	W 100–75	14–3	Lloyd Noble Center; Norman, Oklahoma
Jan 25, 1995		at Kansas State	L 77–87	14–4 (1–2)	Bramlage Coliseum; Manhattan, Kansas
Jan 28, 1995		Nebraska	W 82–72	15–4 (2–2)	Lloyd Noble Center; Norman, Oklahoma
Feb 1, 1995		No. 11 Iowa State	W 79–78	16–4 (3–2)	Lloyd Noble Center; Norman, Oklahoma
Feb 5, 1995		at Nebraska	L 59–71	16–5 (3–3)	Bob Devaney Sports Center; Lincoln, Nebraska
Feb 8, 1995		Kansas State	W 81–66	17–5 (4–3)	Lloyd Noble Center; Norman, Oklahoma
Feb 11, 1995		at No. 2 Kansas	L 76–93	17–6 (4–4)	Allen Fieldhouse; Lawrence, Kansas
Mar 4, 1995		at No. 19 Missouri	L 81–83 ^{OT}	22–7 (9–5)	Hearnes Center; Columbia, Missouri
Big Eight Tournament
Mar 10, 1995*	No. 16	vs. Colorado; Quarterfinals	W 71–53	23–7	Kemper Arena; Kansas City, Missouri
Mar 11, 1995*	No. 16	vs. No. 19 Oklahoma State; Semifinals	L 58–74	23–8	Kemper Arena; Kansas City, Missouri
NCAA Tournament
Mar 16, 1995*	(4 SE) No. 17	vs. (13 SE) Manhattan; First Round	L 67–77	23–9	Pyramid Arena; Memphis, Tennessee
*Non-conference game. ^{#}Rankings from AP Poll. (#) Tournament seedings in parentheses. All times are in Central Time. (#) during NCAA Tournament is seed within region SE=Southeast.
