= 1995 Big Eight Conference men's basketball tournament =

- Classification: Division I
- Season: 1994–95
- Teams: 8
- Finals site: Kemper Arena; Kansas City, MO
- Champions: Oklahoma State (2nd title)
- Winning coach: Eddie Sutton (1st title)
- MVP: Bryant Reeves (Oklahoma State)

1994–95 Big Eight Conference men's basketball standings
	Conf.				Overall
Team	W		L	PCT	W		L	PCT
No. 5 Kansas	11	–	3	.786	25	–	6	.806
No. 14 Oklahoma State †	10	–	4	.714	27	–	10	.730
No. 17 Oklahoma	9	–	5	.643	23	–	9	.719
No. 23 Missouri	8	–	6	.571	20	–	9	.690
Iowa State	6	–	8	.429	23	–	11	.676
Colorado	5	–	9	.357	15	–	13	.536
Nebraska	4	–	10	.286	18	–	14	.563
Kansas State	3	–	11	.214	12	–	15	.444
† 1995 Big Eight tournament winner As of April 4, 1995; Rankings from AP poll

The 1995 Big Eight Conference men's basketball tournament was held March 10–12 at Kemper Arena in Kansas City, Missouri.

Second-seeded Oklahoma State defeated #5 seed Iowa State in the championship game, 62–53, to earn the conference's automatic bid to the 1995 NCAA tournament.

== Bracket ==
Quarterfinals; Friday, March 11
1	#2 Kansas	90
8	Kansas State	45
4	#17 Missouri	50
5	Iowa State	68
3	#16 Oklahoma	71
6	Colorado	54
7	Nebraska	48
2	#19 Oklahoma State	68

Semifinals; Saturday, March 12
1	#2 Kansas	72
5	Iowa State	80
3	#16 Oklahoma	58
2	#19 Oklahoma State	74

Championship; Sunday, March 13
5	Iowa State	53
2	#19 Oklahoma State	62
