= 1994–95 Oregon Ducks men's basketball team =

American college basketball season

1994–95 Oregon Ducks men's basketball

NCAA tournament
- Conference: Pacific-10 Conference
- Record: 19–9 (11–7 Pac-10)
- Head coach: Jerry Green (3rd season)
- Home arena: McArthur Court

1994–95 Pacific-10 Conference men's basketball standings
	Conf.				Overall
Team	W		L	PCT	W		L	PCT
No. 1 UCLA	17	–	1	.944	32	–	1	.970
No. 15 Arizona	14	–	4	.778	24	–	7	.774
No. 16 Arizona State	12	–	6	.667	24	–	9	.727
Oregon	11	–	7	.611	19	–	9	.679
Stanford	10	–	8	.556	20	–	9	.690
Washington State	10	–	8	.556	18	–	12	.600
Washington	6	–	12	.333	10	–	17	.370
Oregon State	6	–	12	.333	9	–	18	.333
USC	4	–	14	.222	9	–	19	.321
California^{1}	0	–	18	.000	0	–	27	.000
As of November 23, 2011; Rankings from AP Poll^{1}California forfeited all wins due to infractions.

The 1994–95 Oregon Ducks men's basketball team represented the University of Oregon as a member of the Pacific-10 Conference during the 1994–95 NCAA Division I men's basketball season. The team was led by third-year head coach Jerry Green and played their home games at McArthur Court in Eugene, Oregon. The Ducks finished fourth in the Pac-10 regular season standings, and received an at-large bid to the NCAA tournament – the program's first appearance since 1961. Playing as the No. 6 seed in the West region, Oregon lost to No. 11 seed Texas, 90–73. The team finished with a record of 19–9 (11–7 Pac-10).

The season's biggest win came in the first conference game against No. 2 UCLA. Oregon defeated the eventual National champion Bruins, 82–72, in what would be UCLA's only official loss of the season.

== Roster ==
1994–95 Oregon Ducks men's basketball team
Players	Coaches
Pos. / # / Name / Height / Weight / Year / Hometown; G / 21 / Orlando Williams / 6 ft 2 in (1.88 m) / — / Sr	Head coach: Jerry Green; Assistant coach(es) Legend: (C) Team captain; (S) Suspended; (I) Ineligible; (W) Walk-on; Injured; Current redshirt; Roster

== Schedule and results ==
Date time, TV	Rank^{#}	Opponent^{#}	Result	Record	Site city, state
Non-conference regular season
Nov 26, 1994*		Wisconsin–Green Bay	W 96–71	1–0	McArthur Court; Eugene, Oregon
Dec 3, 1994*		Seattle Pacific	W 93–77	2–0	McArthur Court; Eugene, Oregon
Dec 10, 1994*		Idaho	W 82–55	3–0	McArthur Court; Eugene, Oregon
Dec 13, 1994*		at Santa Clara	L 83–88	3–1	Toso Pavilion; Santa Clara, California
Dec 17, 1994*		Saint Mary's	W 74–64	4–1	McArthur Court; Eugene, Oregon
Dec 19, 1994		Seattle	W 97–84	5–1 (2–0)	McArthur Court; Eugene, Oregon
Dec 27, 1994*		vs. George Washington	W 77–72 ^{OT}	6–1	Memorial Coliseum; Portland, Oregon
Dec 28, 1994*		vs. Notre Dame	W 73–69	7–1	Memorial Coliseum; Portland, Oregon
Dec 31, 1994*		Montana	W 102–97 ^{2OT}	8–1	McArthur Court; Eugene, Oregon
Pac-10 regular season
Jan 5, 1995		No. 2 UCLA	W 82–72	9–1 (1–0)	McArthur Court (10,086); Eugene, Oregon
Jan 7, 1995		USC	W 95–83	10–1 (2–0)	McArthur Court; Eugene, Oregon
Jan 14, 1995	No. 25	at Oregon State	W 96–83	11–1 (3–0)	Gill Coliseum; Corvallis, Oregon
Jan 19, 1995	No. 17	at Washington State	L 78–83	11–2 (3–1)	Beasley Coliseum; Pullman, Washington
Jan 21, 1995	No. 17	at Washington	W 92–83	12–2 (4–1)	Hec Edmundson Pavilion; Seattle, Washington
Jan 26, 1995	No. 18	No. 12 Arizona	L 89–97	12–3 (4–2)	McArthur Court; Eugene, Oregon
Jan 28, 1995	No. 18	No. 13 Arizona State	L 76–79	12–4 (4–3)	McArthur Court; Eugene, Oregon
Mar 11, 1995		at No. 1 UCLA	L 78–94	19–8 (11–7)	Pauley Pavilion; Los Angeles, California
NCAA Tournament
Mar 16, 1995*	(6 W)	vs. (11 W) Texas; First round	L 73–90	19–9	Jon M. Huntsman Center; Salt Lake City, Utah
*Non-conference game. ^{#}Rankings from AP Poll. (#) Tournament seedings in parentheses. W=West.
