= 1994–95 Arizona Wildcats men's basketball team =

American college basketball season

1994–95 Arizona Wildcats men's basketball

NCAA tournament, first round
- Conference: Pacific-10 Conference

Ranking
- Coaches: No. 25
- AP: No. 15
- Record: 24-7 (14–4 Pac-10)
- Head coach: Lute Olson (12th season)
- Assistant coaches: Jim Rosborough (6th season); Jessie Evans (7th season); Phil Johnson (2nd season)
- Home arena: McKale Center

1994–95 Pacific-10 Conference men's basketball standings
	Conf.				Overall
Team	W		L	PCT	W		L	PCT
No. 1 UCLA	17	–	1	.944	32	–	1	.970
No. 15 Arizona	14	–	4	.778	24	–	7	.774
No. 16 Arizona State	12	–	6	.667	24	–	9	.727
Oregon	11	–	7	.611	19	–	9	.679
Stanford	10	–	8	.556	20	–	9	.690
Washington State	10	–	8	.556	18	–	12	.600
Washington	6	–	12	.333	10	–	17	.370
Oregon State	6	–	12	.333	9	–	18	.333
USC	4	–	14	.222	9	–	19	.321
California^{1}	0	–	18	.000	0	–	27	.000
As of November 23, 2011; Rankings from AP Poll^{1}California forfeited all wins due to infractions.

The 1994–95 Arizona Wildcats men's basketball team represented the University of Arizona. The team's head coach was Lute Olson. The team played its home games in McKale Center as members of the Pacific-10 Conference.

After going 14–4 to finish second in the Pac-10 regular-season, the team was seeded 5th in the Midwest region of the NCAA tournament. They were upset in the opening round by 12 seed Miami (OH), 71–62. The team finished with a record of 24–7.

== Roster ==
1994–95 Arizona Wildcats men's basketball team
Players
Coaches

Pos.	#	Name	Height	Weight	Year	Hometown
F	4	Ben Davis	6 ft 8 in (2.03 m)	240 lb (109 kg)	Jr	Fort Pierce, FL
G	20	Damon Stoudamire	5 ft 10 in (1.78 m)	165 lb (75 kg)	Sr	Portland, Oregon
F	22	Ray Owes	6 ft 9 in (2.06 m)	215 lb (98 kg)	Sr	San Bernardino, California
F	23	Michael Dickerson	6 ft 5 in (1.96 m)	180 lb (82 kg)	Fr	Seattle, WA
G	34	Miles Simon	6 ft 4 in (1.93 m)	190 lb (86 kg)	Fr	Fullerton, CA
G	44	Reggie Geary	6 ft 2 in (1.88 m)	185 lb (84 kg)	Jr	Santa Ana, CA
F/C	50	Joseph Blair	6 ft 11 in (2.11 m)	260 lb (118 kg)	Jr	Houston, TX

Head coach

- Lute Olson (Augsburg)

Assistant coach(es)

Legend

- (C) Team captain
- (S) Suspended
- (I) Ineligible
- (W) Walk-on
- Injured
- Current redshirt

== Schedule and results ==
Date time, TV	Rank^{#}	Opponent^{#}	Result	Record	Site city, state
Regular Season
Nov 24, 1994*	No. 5	vs. Minnesota; Great Alaska Shootout	L 70–72	0–1	Sullivan Arena; Anchorage, Alaska
Nov 25, 1994*	No. 5	at Alaska Anchorage; Great Alaska Shootout	W 107–88	1–1	Sullivan Arena; Anchorage, Alaska
Nov 26, 1994*	No. 5	vs. No. 19 Oklahoma State; Great Alaska Shootout	W 73–63	2–1	Sullivan Arena; Anchorage, Alaska
Dec 17, 1994*	No. 7	at UTEP	W 75–61	7–1	Special Events Center; El Paso, Texas
Dec 22, 1994*	No. 6	at No. 14 Syracuse	L 84–94	7–2	Carrier Dome; Syracuse, New York
Mar 11, 1995	No. 12	No. 18 Arizona State	L 98–103 ^{2OT}	23–7 (13–5)	McKale Center; Tucson, Arizona
NCAA tournament
Mar 16, 1995*	(5 MW) No. 15	vs. (12 MW) Miami (OH); First Round	L 62–71	23–8	UD Arena; Dayton, Ohio
*Non-conference game. ^{#}Rankings from AP Poll. (#) Tournament seedings in parentheses. MW=Midwest.

== NBA draft ==
Round	Pick	Player	NBA Team
1	7	Damon Stoudamire	Toronto Raptors
