= 1994–95 Iowa State Cyclones men's basketball team =

American college basketball season

1994–95 Iowa State Cyclones men's basketball
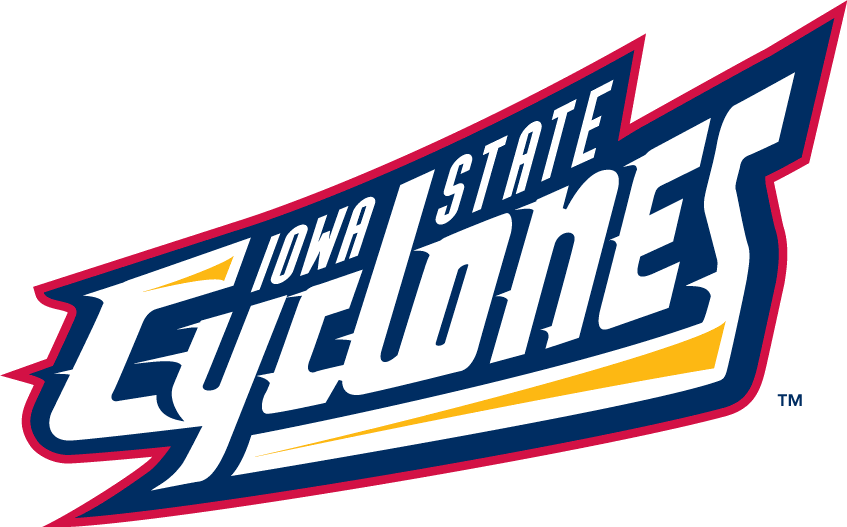

1995 NCAA tournament, second round
- Conference: Big Eight Conference

Ranking
- AP: No. 24
- Record: 23-11 (6-8 Big Eight)
- Head coach: Tim Floyd (1st season)
- Assistant coach: James Green (1st season)
- Home arena: Hilton Coliseum

1994–95 Big Eight Conference men's basketball standings
| | Conf. | | | | Overall |
| Team | W | | L | PCT | W | | L | PCT |
|---|---|---|---|---|---|---|---|---|
| No. 5 Kansas | 11 | – | 3 | .786 | 25 | – | 6 | .806 |
| No. 14 Oklahoma State † | 10 | – | 4 | .714 | 27 | – | 10 | .730 |
| No. 17 Oklahoma | 9 | – | 5 | .643 | 23 | – | 9 | .719 |
| No. 23 Missouri | 8 | – | 6 | .571 | 20 | – | 9 | .690 |
| Iowa State | 6 | – | 8 | .429 | 23 | – | 11 | .676 |
| Colorado | 5 | – | 9 | .357 | 15 | – | 13 | .536 |
| Nebraska | 4 | – | 10 | .286 | 18 | – | 14 | .563 |
| Kansas State | 3 | – | 11 | .214 | 12 | – | 15 | .444 |
† 1995 Big Eight tournament winner As of April 4, 1995; Rankings from AP poll

The 1994–95 Iowa State Cyclones men's basketball team represented Iowa State University during the 1994–95 NCAA Division I men's basketball season. The Cyclones were coached by Tim Floyd, who was in his first season. They played their home games at Hilton Coliseum in Ames, Iowa.

They finished the season 23–11, 6–8 in Big Eight play to finish in 5th place. Their 23 wins were a school record at the time. They defeated #17 Missouri and #2 Kansas, but lost to #19 Oklahoma State in the 1995 Big Eight conference tournament championship. They earned an at-large bid to the NCAA tournament and a #7 seed. In the tournament they defeated Florida and lost to North Carolina in the second round, who advanced to the Final Four.

Games were televised by ESPN, Big 8 (Creative Sports), the Cyclone Television Network, the Hawkeye Television Network and the UNI Television Network (KWWL).

== Previous season ==
In the previous season, the Cyclones finished 14–13, 4–10 in Big Eight play to finish in 7th place. They defeated #23 Oklahoma State in the 1994 Big Eight conference tournament quarterfinals.

Following the 1993–94 season, head coach Johnny Orr retired after 14 seasons at Iowa State. The Cyclones then hired University of New Orleans head coach, Tim Floyd. Floyd had gone 127–58 over six season with the Privateers, including two NCAA tournament appearances. He is one of only four Division I coaches who have won four conference championships in the first five years at their school.

== Roster ==
Roster
| Name | Position | Class |
|---|---|---|
| Fred Hoiberg | Guard | Senior |
| Loren Meyer | Center | Senior |
| Julius Michalik | Forward | Senior |
| Hurl Beechum | Forward | Senior |
| Derrick Hayes | Guard | Sophomore |
| James Hamilton | Forward | Senior |
| Saun Jackson | Forward | Senior |
| Jacy Holloway | Guard | Sophomore |
| Joe Modderman | Forward | Sophomore |
| David Hickman | Junior | Forward |
| Joe Hebert | Guard | Junior |
| Ha-Keem Abdel-Kahliq | Guard | Sophomore |
| Klay Edwards | Forward | Freshman |
| Sol Harris | Guard | Freshman |

== Schedule and results ==
| Date time, TV | Rank^{#} | Opponent^{#} | Result | Record | Site city, state |
Regular season
| November 15, 1994*; 7:00 pm | | Marathon Oil; Exhibition | L 85-95 | | Hilton Coliseum (11,765); Ames, Iowa |
| November 20, 1994*; 1:00 pm | | Latvian National Team; Exhibition | W 95-73 | | Hilton Coliseum (9,461); Ames, Iowa |
Regular season
| November 25, 1994*; 6:15 pm CT | | vs. Illinois State; Big Island Invitational Tournament | W 88-71 | 1-0 | Afook-Chinen Civic Auditorium; Hilo, HI |
| November 26, 1994*; 11:45 pm CT | | vs. Virginia Commonwealth; Big Island Invitational Tournament | W 66-59 | 2-0 | Afook-Chinen Civic Auditorium; Hilo, HI |
| November 27, 1994*; 4:00 pm | | vs. Purdue; Big Island Invitational Tournament | L 87-88 ^{OT} | 2-1 | Afook-Chinen Civic Auditorium; Hilo, HI |
| November 30, 1994*; 7:05 pm | | Florida Tech | W 97-65 | 3-1 | Hilton Coliseum; Ames, Iowa |
| December 3, 1994*; 12:35 pm, Cyclone Television Network | | Wyoming | W 82-63 | 4-1 | Hilton Coliseum; Ames, Iowa |
| December 6, 1994*; 7:05 pm, Cyclone Television Network | | Drake | W 94-69 | 5-1 | Hilton Coliseum; Ames, Iowa |
| December 10, 1994*; 4:05 pm, Iowa Television Network | | at Iowa | W 76-63 | 6-1 | Carver–Hawkeye Arena; Iowa City, Iowa |
| December 18, 1994*; 1:05 pm, Cyclone Television Network | | Western Carolina | W 99-66 | 7-1 | Hilton Coliseum; Ames, Iowa |
| December 22, 1994*; 7:05 pm, Cyclone Television Network | No. 25 | North Florida | W 114-80 | 8-1 | Hilton Coliseum; Ames, Iowa |
| December 27, 1994*; 7:05 pm, Cyclone Television Network | No. 21 | Chicago State | W 96-47 | 9-1 | Hilton Coliseum; Ames, Iowa |
| December 31, 1994*; 6:05 pm, Cyclone Television Network | No. 21 | San Diego | W 75-55 | 10-1 | Hilton Coliseum; Ames, Iowa |
| January 3, 1995*; 7:05 pm, Cyclone Television Network | No. 16 | Loyola-New Orleans | W 74-44 | 11-1 | Hilton Coliseum; Ames, Iowa |
| January 7, 1995; 7:05 pm, Cyclone Television Network | No. 16 | at Colorado | L 57-71 | 11-2 (0-1) | Coors Events Center; Boulder, Colorado |
| January 9, 1995*; 7:05 pm, Cyclone Television Network | No. 23 | Saint Louis | W 79-66 | 12-2 (0-1) | Hilton Coliseum; Ames, Iowa |
| January 14, 1995; 2:55 pm, Creative Sports/ESPN2 | No. 23 | No. 3 Kansas | W 69-65 | 13-2 (1-1) | Hilton Coliseum; Ames, Iowa |
| January 18, 1995*; 7:05 pm | No. 14 | at Creighton | W 70-52 | 14-2 (1-1) | Omaha Civic Auditorium; Omaha, Nebraska |
| January 21, 1995; 12:30 pm, Creative Sports | No. 14 | at Kansas State | W 79-73 | 15-2 (2-1) | Bramlage Coliseum; Manhattan, Kansas |
| January 25, 1995*; 7:05 pm, UNI (KWWL) | No. 11 | at Northern Iowa | W 81-62 | 16-2 (2-1) | UNI-Dome; Cedar Falls, Iowa |
| January 28, 1995; 12:50 pm, Creative Sports | No. 11 | Kansas State | W 87-79 | 17-2 (3-1) | Hilton Coliseum; Ames, Iowa |
| January 30, 1995; 8:35 pm, ESPN | No. 11 | No. 18 Missouri | L 71-80 | 17-3 (3-2) | Hilton Coliseum; Ames, Iowa |
| February 1, 1995; 7:05 pm | No. 11 | at No. 24 Oklahoma | L 78-79 | 17-4 (3-3) | Lloyd Noble Center; Norman, Oklahoma |
| February 4, 1995; 2:50 pm, Creative Sports | No. 11 | at No. 3 Kansas | L 71-91 | 17-5 (3-4) | Allen Fieldhouse; Lawrence, Kansas |
| February 8, 1995; 8:05 pm, Creative Sports | No. 19 | at No. 13 Missouri | L 56-59 | 17-6 (3-5) | Hearnes Center; Columbia, Missouri |
| February 11, 1995; 12:50 pm, Creative Sports | No. 19 | Nebraska | W 72-69 ^{OT} | 18-6 (4-5) | Hilton Coliseum; Ames, Iowa |
| February 15, 1995; 7:05 pm, Creative Sports | No. 21 | No. 22 Oklahoma State | L 69-71 | 18-7 (4-6) | Hilton Coliseum; Ames, Iowa |
| February 18, 1995; 12:45 pm, Creative Sports | No. 21 | Colorado | W 108-68 | 19-7 (5-6) | Hilton Coliseum; Ames, Iowa |
| February 27, 1995; 8:35 pm, ESPN | No. 24 | at No. 18 Oklahoma State | L 47-77 | 19-8 (5-7) | Gallagher-Iba Arena; Stillwater, Oklahoma |
| March 1, 1995; 7:00 pm, Cyclone Television Network | No. 24 | No. 16 Oklahoma | L 68-71 | 19-9 (5-8) | Hilton Coliseum; Ames, Iowa |
| March 5, 1995; 12:35 pm, Cyclone Television Network | No. 24 | at Nebraska | W 79-77 | 20-9 (6-8) | Bob Devaney Center; Lincoln, Nebraska |
Big Eight tournament
| March 10, 1995; 2:20 pm, Creative Sports/ESPN2 | | vs. No. 17 Missouri; Quarterfinals | W 68-50 | 21-9 (6-8) | Kemper Arena; Kansas City, Missouri |
| March 11, 1995; 1:05 pm, Creative Sports/ESPN2 | | vs. No. 2 Kansas; Semifinals | W 80-72 ^{OT} | 22-9 (6-8) | Kemper Arena; Kansas City, Missouri |
| March 12, 1995; 12:05 pm, Creative Sports/ESPN | | vs. No. 19 Oklahoma State; Championship | L 53-62 | 22-10 (6-8) | Kemper Arena; Kansas City, Missouri |
NCAA Tournament
| March 17, 1995; 11:15 am, CBS | (#7) No. 24 | vs. (#10) Florida; First round | W 64-61 | 23-10 (6-8) | BJCC; Birmingham, Alabama |
| March 19, 1995; 1:45 pm, CBS | (#7) | vs. (#2) No. 4 North Carolina; Second round | L 51-73 | 23-11 (6-8) | BJCC (8,740); Birmingham, Alabama |
*Non-conference game. ^{#}Rankings from AP poll. (#) Tournament seedings in parentheses. All times are in Central Time.

== Awards and honors ==
- All-Americans

Fred Hoiberg (HM)

- Academic All-Americans

Fred Hoiberg (First team)

- All-Big Eight Selections

Fred Hoiberg (First team)
Loren Meyer (HM)
Julius Michalik (HM)

- All-Big Eight tournament Team

Hurl Beechum
Loren Meyer

- Ralph A. Olsen Award

Fred Hoiberg

== NBA draft ==
NBA draft picks
| Round | Pick | Overall | Name | Team |
|---|---|---|---|---|
| 1 | 24 | 24 | Loren Meyer | Dallas Mavericks |
| 2 | 23 | 52 | Fred Hoiberg | Indiana Pacers |
