= 1994–95 Kansas Jayhawks men's basketball team =

American college basketball season

1994–95 Kansas Jayhawks men's basketball

Big Eight Regular Season Champions

NCAA men's Division I tournament, Sweet Sixteen
- Conference: Big Eight Conference

Ranking
- Coaches: No. 10
- AP: No. 5
- Record: 25–6 (11–3 Big Eight)
- Head coach: Roy Williams (7th season)
- Assistant coaches: Matt Doherty (3rd season); Joe Holladay (1st season); Steve Robinson (7th season)
- Captains: Greg Gurley; Scott Novosel; Greg Ostertag
- Home arena: Allen Fieldhouse

1994–95 Big Eight Conference men's basketball standings
| | Conf. | | | | Overall |
| Team | W | | L | PCT | W | | L | PCT |
|---|---|---|---|---|---|---|---|---|
| No. 5 Kansas | 11 | – | 3 | .786 | 25 | – | 6 | .806 |
| No. 14 Oklahoma State † | 10 | – | 4 | .714 | 27 | – | 10 | .730 |
| No. 17 Oklahoma | 9 | – | 5 | .643 | 23 | – | 9 | .719 |
| No. 23 Missouri | 8 | – | 6 | .571 | 20 | – | 9 | .690 |
| Iowa State | 6 | – | 8 | .429 | 23 | – | 11 | .676 |
| Colorado | 5 | – | 9 | .357 | 15 | – | 13 | .536 |
| Nebraska | 4 | – | 10 | .286 | 18 | – | 14 | .563 |
| Kansas State | 3 | – | 11 | .214 | 12 | – | 15 | .444 |
† 1995 Big Eight tournament winner As of April 4, 1995; Rankings from AP poll

The 1994–95 Kansas Jayhawks men's basketball team represented the University of Kansas in the 1994–95 NCAA Division I men's basketball season, which was the Jayhawks' 97th basketball season. The head coach was Roy Williams, who served his 7th year at KU. The team played its home games in Allen Fieldhouse in Lawrence, Kansas.

== Roster ==
| Name | # | Position | Height | Weight | Year | Home Town |
|---|---|---|---|---|---|---|
| Joel Branstrom | 44 | Forward | 6-6 | 190 | Junior | Half Moon Bay, California |
| Greg Gurley | 33 | Guard | 6-5 | 215 | Senior | Leawood, Kansas |
| Jerod Haase | 35 | Guard | 6-3 | 185 | Sophomore | South Lake Tahoe, California |
| Raef LaFrentz | 45 | Forward | 6–11 | 220 | Freshman | Hampton, Iowa |
| C.B. McGrath | 24 | Guard | 5-11 | 160 | Freshman | Topeka, Kansas |
| Scott Novosel | 5 | Guard | 6-1 | 175 | Senior | Leawood, Kansas |
| Greg Ostertag | 00 | Center | 7-2 | 270 | Senior | Duncanville, Texas |
| Sean Pearson | 21 | Forward/Guard | 6–5 | 210 | Junior | LaGrange, Illinois |
| Scot Pollard | 31 | Center | 6–10 | 250 | Sophomore | San Diego, California |
| Calvin Rayford | 10 | Guard | 5-7 | 155 | Senior(RS) | Milwaukee, Wisconsin |
| Billy Thomas | 12 | Forward/Guard | 6–4 | 200 | Freshman | Shreveport, Louisiana |
| Jacque Vaughn | 11 | Guard | 6–1 | 195 | Sophomore | Pasadena, California |
| T.J. Whatley | 14 | Guard | 6–4 | 180 | Junior | Benton, Arkansas |
| B.J. Williams | 22 | Forward | 6–8 | 205 | Sophomore | Wichita, Kansas |

== Big Eight Conference standings ==
| # | Team | Conference | Pct. | Overall | Pct. |
|---|---|---|---|---|---|
| 1 | Kansas | 11-3 | .786 | 25-6 | .806 |
| 2 | Oklahoma State | 10-4 | .714 | 27-10 | .730 |
| 3 | Oklahoma | 9-5 | .643 | 23-9 | .719 |
| 4 | Missouri | 8-6 | .571 | 20-9 | .690 |
| 5 | Iowa State | 6-8 | .429 | 23-11 | .676 |
| 6 | Colorado | 5-9 | .357 | 15-13 | .536 |
| 7 | Nebraska | 4-10 | .289 | 18-14 | .563 |
| 8 | Kansas State | 3-11 | .214 | 12-15 | .444 |

== Schedule ==
| Date time, TV | Rank^{#} | Opponent^{#} | Result | Record | Site city, state |
|---|---|---|---|---|---|
| 11/26/1994* | No. 9 | San Diego | W 83-65 | 1–0 | Allen Fieldhouse; Lawrence, KS |
| 12/3/1994* | No. 7 | vs. No. 1 UMass; John R. Wooden Classic | W 81-75 | 2–0 | Arrowhead Pond of Anaheim (18,300); Anaheim, CA |
| 12/5/1994* | No. 4 | Coppin State | W 91-69 | 3–0 | Allen Fieldhouse; Lawrence, KS |
| 12/7/1994* | No. 4 | No. 6 Florida | W 69-63 | 4–0 | Allen Fieldhouse; Lawrence, KS |
| 12/10/1994* | No. 4 | at NC State | W 96-91 | 5-0 | Reynolds Coliseum; Raleigh, NC |
| 12/17/1994* | No. 3 | at Indiana | L 61-80 | 5-1 | Assembly Hall; Bloomington, Indiana |
| 12/20/1994* | No. 7 | Santa Clara | W 80-75 | 6-1 | Allen Fieldhouse; Lawrence, KS |
| 12/22/1994* | No. 7 | Rice | W 71-57 | 7-1 | Allen Fieldhouse; Lawrence, KS |
| 12/31/1994* | No. 6 | Fort Hays State | W 93-55 | 8-1 | Allen Fieldhouse; Lawrence, KS |
| 1/3/1995* | No. 5 | East Tennessee State | W 106-73 | 9-1 | Allen Fieldhouse; Lawrence, KS |
| 1/7/1995* | No. 5 | at SMU | W 97-58 | 10-1 | Moody Coliseum; University Park, TX |
| 1/9/1995 | No. 3 | at No. 17 Missouri; Border War | W 102-89 | 11-1 | Hearnes Center; Columbia, MO |
| 1/14/1995; ESPN2 | No. 3 | at No. 23 Iowa State | L 65-69 | 11-2 | Hilton Coliseum; Ames, IA |
| 1/18/1995 | No. 7 | Kansas State; Sunflower Showdown | W 78-74 | 12-2 | Allen Fieldhouse; Lawrence, KS |
| 1/21/1995 | No. 7 | at Colorado | W 91-77 | 13-2 | Coors Events Center; Boulder, CO |
| 1/23/1995 | No. 7 | Nebraska | W 84-67 | 14-2 | Allen Fieldhouse; Lawrence, KS |
| 1/28/1995*; CBS | No. 7 | vs. No. 2 Connecticut; PowerBar Shootout | W 88-59 | 15-2 | Kemper Arena (16,981); Kansas City, MO |
| 2/1/1995 | No. 3 | Colorado | W 99-77 | 16-2 | Allen Fieldhouse; Lawrence, KS |
| 2/4/1995 | No. 3 | No. 11 Iowa State | W 91-71 | 17-2 | Allen Fieldhouse; Lawrence, KS |
| 2/6/1995 | No. 2 | at No. 24 Oklahoma State | L 69-79 | 17-3 | Gallagher-Iba Arena; Stillwater, OK |
| 2/11/1995 | No. 2 | Oklahoma | W 93-76 | 18-3 | Allen Fieldhouse; Lawrence, KS |
| 2/14/1995 | No. 3 | at Nebraska | W 91-68 | 19-3 | Bob Devaney Sports Center; Lincoln, NE |
| 2/18/1995 | No. 3 | at Kansas State; Sunflower Showdown | W 78-67 | 20-3 | Bramlage Coliseum; Manhattan, KS |
| 2/20/1995 | No. 1 | at No. 25 Oklahoma | L 73-76 | 20-4 | Lloyd Noble Center; Norman, OK |
| 2/25/1995 | No. 1 | No. 14 Missouri; Border War | W 88-69 | 21-4 | Allen Fieldhouse; Lawrence, KS |
| 3/5/1995 | No. 3 | No. 18 Oklahoma State | W 78-62 | 22-4 | Allen Fieldhouse; Lawrence, KS |
Big Eight Tournament
| 3/10/1995 | (1) No. 2 | vs. (8) Kansas State; Quarterfinals | W 90-45 | 23-4 | Kemper Arena; Kansas City, MO |
| 3/11/1995 | (1) No. 2 | vs. (5) Iowa State; Semifinals | L 72-80 ^{OT} | 23-5 | Kemper Arena; Kansas City, MO |
NCAA tournament
| 3/16/1995* | (1 MW) No. 5 | vs. (16 MW) Colgate; First Round | W 82–68 | 24–5 | University of Dayton Arena; Dayton, OH |
| 3/18/1995* | (1 MW) No. 5 | vs. (8 MW) No. 21 Western Kentucky; Second Round | W 75–70 | 25–5 | University of Dayton Arena; Dayton, OH |
| 3/24/1995* | (1 MW) No. 5 | vs. (4 MW) No. 13 Virginia; Midwest Regional Final – Sweet Sixteen | L 58–67 | 25–6 | Kemper Arena; Kansas City, MO |
*Non-conference game. ^{#}Rankings from AP Poll, NCAA tournament seeds shown in parentheses. (#) Tournament seedings in parentheses. MW=Midwest. All times are in Central Standard Time.

== Rankings ==
| Poll | Pre | Wk 1 | Wk 2 | Wk 3 | Wk 4 | Wk 5 | Wk 6 | Wk 7 | Wk 8 | Wk 9 | Wk 10 | Wk 11 | Wk 12 | Wk 13 | Wk 14 | Wk 15 | Wk 16 | Wk 17 |
|---|---|---|---|---|---|---|---|---|---|---|---|---|---|---|---|---|---|---|
| AP | 11 | 9 | 7 | 4 | 3 | 7 | 6 | 5 | 3 | 7 | 7 | 3 | 2 | 3 | 1 | 3 | 2 | 5 |
| Coaches | | | | | | | | | | | | | | | | | | |

*There was no coaches poll in week 1.

== See also ==
- 1995 NCAA Division I men's basketball tournament
