= 1994–95 Louisville Cardinals men's basketball team =

American college basketball season

1994–95 Louisville Cardinals men's basketball

Metro Conference tournament champions

NCAA tournament, Round of 64
- Conference: Metro Conference (1975–1995)
- Record: 19–14 (7–5 Metro)
- Head coach: Denny Crum (24th season)
- Home arena: Freedom Hall

1994–95 Metro Conference men's basketball standings
	Conf.				Overall
Team	W		L	PCT	W		L	PCT
UNC Charlotte	8	–	4	.667	19	–	9	.679
Tulane	7	–	5	.583	23	–	10	.697
Louisville †	7	–	5	.583	19	–	14	.576
Virginia Tech	6	–	6	.500	25	–	10	.714
Southern Miss	6	–	6	.500	17	–	13	.567
South Florida	5	–	7	.417	18	–	12	.600
VCU	3	–	9	.250	16	–	14	.533
† 1995 Metro Conference tournament winner Rankings from AP Poll

The 1994–95 Louisville Cardinals men's basketball team represented the University of Louisville in the 1994–95 NCAA Division I men's basketball season. The head coach was Denny Crum and the team finished the season with an overall record of 19–14.
