= 1994–95 Nebraska Cornhuskers men's basketball team =

American college basketball season

1994–95 Nebraska Cornhuskers men's basketball

NIT
- Conference: Big Eight Conference
- Record: 18-14 (4-10 Big Eight)
- Head coach: Danny Nee (9th season)
- Assistant coaches: Gary Bargen; Jeff Smith; Jimmy Williams
- Home arena: Bob Devaney Sports Center

1994–95 Big Eight Conference men's basketball standings
	Conf.				Overall
Team	W		L	PCT	W		L	PCT
No. 5 Kansas	11	–	3	.786	25	–	6	.806
No. 14 Oklahoma State †	10	–	4	.714	27	–	10	.730
No. 17 Oklahoma	9	–	5	.643	23	–	9	.719
No. 23 Missouri	8	–	6	.571	20	–	9	.690
Iowa State	6	–	8	.429	23	–	11	.676
Colorado	5	–	9	.357	15	–	13	.536
Nebraska	4	–	10	.286	18	–	14	.563
Kansas State	3	–	11	.214	12	–	15	.444
† 1995 Big Eight tournament winner As of April 4, 1995; Rankings from AP poll

The 1994–95 Nebraska Cornhuskers men's basketball team represented the University of Nebraska–Lincoln during the 1994–95 college basketball season. Led by head coach Danny Nee (9th season), the Cornhuskers competed in the Big Eight Conference and played their home games at the Bob Devaney Sports Center.

They finished with a record of 18–14 overall and 4–10 in Big Eight Conference play. Nebraska failed to reach the 1995 NCAA tournament, breaking a streak of 4 consecutive appearances. They played in the 1994 National Invitation Tournament, where they advanced to the 2nd round.

== Roster ==
1994–95 Nebraska Cornhuskers men's basketball team
Players
Coaches

Pos.	#	Name	Height	Weight	Year	Previous school	Hometown
F	3	Chester Surles	6 ft 7 in (2.01 m)	212 lb (96 kg)	Fr	Buena Vista	Saginaw, MI
F	5	Terrance Badgett	6 ft 6 in (1.98 m)	224 lb (102 kg)	Jr	Omaha South	Omaha, NE
G	12	Tom Wald	6 ft 1 in (1.85 m)	181 lb (82 kg)	Jr	Park Center	Brooklyn Park, MN
C	13	Chris Sallee	6 ft 10 in (2.08 m)	230 lb (104 kg)	Jr	Horizon	Scottsdale, AZ
G	21	Erick Strickland	6 ft 3 in (1.91 m)	213 lb (97 kg)	Jr	Bellevue West	Bellevue, NE
G	24	Jaron Boone	6 ft 6 in (1.98 m)	200 lb (91 kg)	Jr	Skyline	Salt Lake City, UT
G	30	Jason Glock	6 ft 5 in (1.96 m)	202 lb (92 kg)	Jr	Wahoo	Wahoo, NE
G	31	Chad Ideus	6 ft 6 in (1.98 m)	203 lb (92 kg)	Fr	Adams	Adams, NE
C	32	Mikki Moore	6 ft 11 in (2.11 m)	208 lb (94 kg)	So	Blacksburg	Gaffney, SC
G	33	Lee Steinbrook	6 ft 4 in (1.93 m)	177 lb (80 kg)	Jr	Thornwood	Columbus, NE
F	34	Melvin Brooks	6 ft 8 in (2.03 m)	235 lb (107 kg)	Sr	Northeastern	Elizabeth City, NC
F	44	Andy Markowski	6 ft 8 in (2.03 m)	200 lb (91 kg)	Fr	Ord	Ord, NE
F	54	Leif Nelson	6 ft 11 in (2.11 m)	272 lb (123 kg)	Fr	Arlington	Riverside, CA

Head coach

Danny Nee

Assistant coach(es)

- Gary Bargen
- Jeff Smith
- Jimmy Williams

Legend

- (C) Team captain
- (S) Suspended
- (I) Ineligible
- (W) Walk-on
- Injured
- Current redshirt

Roster
Last update: May 12, 2024

== Schedule and results ==
Date time, TV	Rank^{#}	Opponent^{#}	Result	Record	Site city, state
Regular season
Nov 25, 1994*		vs. Northeast Louisiana; San Juan Shootout	W 99–77	1–0	Roberto Clemente Coliseum; San Juan, Puerto Rico
Nov 26, 1994*		vs. Virginia Tech; San Juan Shootout	L 81–87	1–1	Roberto Clemente Coliseum; San Juan, Puerto Rico
Nov 27, 1994*		vs. College of Charleston; San Juan Shootout	W 74–72	2–1	Roberto Clemente Coliseum; San Juan, Puerto Rico
Dec 2, 1994*		Morehead State; Ameritas Classic	W 96–55	3–1	Bob Devaney Sports Center; Lincoln, Nebraska
Dec 3, 1994*		Idaho State; Ameritas Classic	W 98–72	4–1	Bob Devaney Sports Center; Lincoln, Nebraska
Dec 7, 1994*		Creighton; Rivalry	W 85–57	5–1	Bob Devaney Sports Center; Lincoln, Nebraska
Dec 10, 1994*		No. 15 Michigan State	W 96–91 ^{OT}	6–1	Bob Devaney Sports Center; Lincoln, Nebraska
Dec 17, 1994*		Western Illinois	W 69–62	7–1	Bob Devaney Sports Center; Lincoln, Nebraska
Dec 21, 1994*		Northeastern Illinois	W 101–60	8–1	Bob Devaney Sports Center; Lincoln, Nebraska
Dec 22, 1994*		at Northern Iowa	W 95–88 ^{OT}	9–1	UNI-Dome; Cedar Falls, Iowa
Dec 29, 1994*	No. 23	Delaware State	W 94–52	10–1	Bob Devaney Sports Center; Lincoln, Nebraska
Dec 31, 1994*	No. 23	Appalachian State	W 108–71	11–1	Bob Devaney Sports Center; Lincoln, Nebraska
Jan 4, 1995*	No. 19	at Texas	L 74–102	11–2	Frank Erwin Center; Austin, Texas
Jan 7, 1995	No. 19	Missouri	L 74–82	11–3 (0–1)	Bob Devaney Sports Center; Lincoln, Nebraska
Jan 9, 1995*		at Long Beach State	W 82–71	12–3	Walter Pyramid; Long Beach, California
Jan 12, 1995		Kansas State	W 78–56	13–3 (1–1)	Bob Devaney Sports Center; Lincoln, Nebraska
Jan 18, 1995*		at UMKC	W 63–60	14–3	Municipal Auditorium; Kansas City, Missouri
Jan 23, 1995		at No. 7 Kansas	L 67–84	14–4 (1–2)	Allen Fieldhouse; Lawrence, Kansas
Jan 28, 1995		at No. 25 Oklahoma	L 72–82	14–5 (1–3)	Lloyd Noble Center; Norman, Oklahoma
Feb 1, 1995		Oklahoma State	L 65–82	14–6 (1–4)	Bob Devaney Sports Center; Lincoln, Nebraska
Feb 5, 1995		No. 24 Oklahoma	W 71–59	15–6 (2–4)	Bob Devaney Sports Center; Lincoln, Nebraska
Feb 8, 1995		at Colorado	W 100–86	16–6 (3–4)	Coors Events Center; Boulder, Colorado
Feb 11, 1995; 12:50 p.m.		at No. 19 Iowa State	L 69–72 ^{OT}	16–7 (3–5)	Hilton Coliseum; Ames, Iowa
Feb 14, 1995		No. 3 Kansas	L 68–91	16–8 (3–6)	Bob Devaney Sports Center; Lincoln, Nebraska
Feb 18, 1995		at No. 22 Oklahoma State	L 53–93	16–9 (3–7)	Gallagher-Iba Arena; Stillwater, Oklahoma
Feb 22, 1995		at No. 14 Missouri	W 78–75	17–9 (4–7)	Hearnes Center; Columbia, Missouri
Feb 25, 1995		Colorado	L 74–80	17–10 (4–8)	Bob Devaney Sports Center; Lincoln, Nebraska
Mar 1, 1995		at Kansas State	L 73–75	17–11 (4–9)	Bramlage Coliseum; Manhattan, Kansas
Mar 5, 1995		No. 24 Iowa State	L 77–79	17–12 (4–10)	Bob Devaney Sports Center; Lincoln, Nebraska
Big Eight tournament
Mar 11, 1995*	(7)	vs. (2) No. 19 Oklahoma State; Quarterfinals	L 48–68	17–13	Kemper Arena; Kansas City, Missouri
National Invitation Tournament
Mar 15, 1995*		at Georgia; NIT First Round	W 62–56	18–13	Bob Devaney Sports Center; Lincoln, Nebraska
Mar 21, 1995*		Penn State; NIT Second Round	L 59–65	18–14	Bob Devaney Sports Center; Lincoln, Nebraska
*Non-conference game. ^{#}Rankings from AP Poll. (#) Tournament seedings in parentheses. E=East. All times are in Central Time.
