= 1994–95 Arizona State Sun Devils men's basketball team =

American college basketball season

1994–95 Arizona State Sun Devils men's basketball

Maui Invitational champions

NCAA tournament, Sweet Sixteen
- Conference: Pacific-10 Conference

Ranking
- Coaches: No. 13
- AP: No. 16
- Record: 24–9 (12–6 Pac-10)
- Head coach: Bill Frieder (5th season)
- Home arena: ASU Activity Center

1994–95 Pacific-10 Conference men's basketball standings
	Conf.				Overall
Team	W		L	PCT	W		L	PCT
No. 1 UCLA	17	–	1	.944	32	–	1	.970
No. 15 Arizona	14	–	4	.778	24	–	7	.774
No. 16 Arizona State	12	–	6	.667	24	–	9	.727
Oregon	11	–	7	.611	19	–	9	.679
Stanford	10	–	8	.556	20	–	9	.690
Washington State	10	–	8	.556	18	–	12	.600
Washington	6	–	12	.333	10	–	17	.370
Oregon State	6	–	12	.333	9	–	18	.333
USC	4	–	14	.222	9	–	19	.321
California^{1}	0	–	18	.000	0	–	27	.000
As of November 23, 2011; Rankings from AP Poll^{1}California forfeited all wins due to infractions.

The 1994–95 Arizona State Sun Devils men's basketball team represented Arizona State University during the 1994–95 NCAA men's basketball season as member of the Pac-10 Conference. The Sun Devils played their home games at Wells Fargo Arena and were coached by Bill Frieder in his fifth year at Arizona State. The Sun Devils finished with a record for 24–9, 12–6 to finish in third place in Pac-10 play. ASU received a bid to the NCAA tournament as a #5 seed. There, they defeated Ball State and Manhattan to advance to the Sweet Sixteen. In the Sweet Sixteen, they lost to the #1 seed Kentucky, 97–73.

== Roster ==
1994–95 Arizona State men's basketball team
#	Name	Class	Position	Height	Summary
00	James Bacon	SR	C	6-9	5.2 Pts, 4.1 Reb, 0.4 Ast
5	Courtney Hargrays	SO	G	6-6	1.0 Pts, 0.6 Reb, 0.4 Ast
10	Marcell Capers	SR	G	6-2	5.8 Pts, 2.4 Reb, 7.1 Ast
11	Eli Lopez	SR	G	5-11	0.4 Pts, 0.3 Reb, 0.3 Ast
21	Jeremy Veal	FR	G	6-3	7.4 Pts, 1.3 Reb, 1.6 Ast
22	Ryan Cuff	SO	G	6-5	3.0 Pts, 0.9 Reb, 1.3 Ast
24	Isaac Burton	SR	G	6-5	14.2 Pts, 3.4 Reb, 2.5 Ast
25	Jimmy Kolyszko	JR	F	6-7	4.1 Pts, 2.6 Reb, 0.9 Ast
32	Ron Riley	JR	G	6-5	16.0 Pts, 5.3 Reb, 1.5 Ast
34	Quincy Brewer	SO	F	6-5	6.7 Pts, 5.3 Reb, 1.6 Ast
40	Joe Zaletel	JR	F	6-7	1.8 Pts, 1.0 Reb, 0.2 As
42	Mario Bennett	JR	F	6-6	18.7 Pts, 8.2 Reb, 2.4 Ast
50	J.R. Cunningham	FR	F	6-8	0.1 Pts, 0.9 Reb, 0.3 Ast

== Schedule and results ==
Date time, TV	Rank^{#}	Opponent^{#}	Result	Record	Site city, state
Regular season
Nov 21, 1994*		vs. Texas A&M; Maui Invitational	W 103–73	1–0	Lahaina Civic Center; Lahaina, Hawaii
Nov 22, 1994*		vs. No. 13 Michigan; Maui Invitational	W 79–62	2–0	Lahaina Civic Center; Lahaina, Hawaii
Nov 23, 1994*		vs. No. 7 Maryland; Maui Invitational	W 97–90	3–0	Lahaina Civic Center; Lahaina, Hawaii
Dec 1, 1994*	No. 12	Northern Arizona	W 74–50	4–0	ASU Activity Center; Tempe, Arizona
Dec 3, 1994*	No. 12	at New Mexico	L 71–87	4–1	The Pit; Albuquerque, New Mexico
Dec 17, 1994*	No. 13	UC Irvine	W 87–58	5–1	ASU Activity Center; Tempe, Arizona
Dec 18, 1994*	No. 13	Texas-San Antonio	L 85–87 ^{OT}	5–2	ASU Activity Center; Tempe, Arizona
Dec 20, 1994*	No. 15	Cal Poly	W 98–43	6–2	ASU Activity Center; Tempe, Arizona
Dec 22, 1994*	No. 15	Oklahoma State	W 72–69	7–2	ASU Activity Center; Tempe, Arizona
Dec 28, 1994*	No. 16	Pacific	W 65–50	8–2	ASU Activity Center; Tempe, Arizona
Dec 29, 1994*	No. 16	Vanderbilt	W 67–61	9–2	ASU Activity Center; Tempe, Arizona
Jan 5, 1995	No. 15	No. 9 Arizona	W 53–52	10–2 (1–0)	ASU Activity Center; Tempe, Arizona
Jan 7, 1995*	No. 15	Old Dominion	W 71–52	11–2	ASU Activity Center; Tempe, Arizona
Jan 12, 1995	No. 12	at Stanford	L 75–91	11–3 (1–1)	Maples Pavilion; Stanford, California
Jan 14, 1995	No. 12	at No. 20 California	W 73–68	12–3 (2–1)	Harmon Gym; Berkeley, California
Jan 19, 1995	No. 13	USC	W 81–71	13–3 (3–1)	ASU Activity Center; Tempe, Arizona
Jan 21, 1995	No. 13	No. 4 UCLA	L 72–85	13–4 (3–2)	ASU Activity Center; Tempe, Arizona
Jan 26, 1995	No. 13	at Oregon State	L 70–83	13–5 (3–3)	Gill Coliseum; Corvallis, Oregon
Jan 28, 1995	No. 13	at No. 18 Oregon	W 79–76	14–5 (4–3)	McArthur Court; Eugene, Oregon
Feb 2, 1995	No. 16	Washington	W 78–73 ^{OT}	15–5 (5–3)	ASU Activity Center; Tempe, Arizona
Feb 5, 1995	No. 16	Washington State	W 87–60	16–5 (6–3)	ASU Activity Center; Tempe, Arizona
Feb 9, 1995	No. 14	California	W 100–81	17–5 (7–3)	ASU Activity Center; Tempe, Arizona
Feb 11, 1995	No. 14	No. 15 Stanford	W 79–70	18–5 (8–3)	ASU Activity Center; Tempe, Arizona
Feb 16, 1995	No. 13	at No. 6 UCLA	L 77–82 ^{OT}	18–6 (8–4)	Pauley Pavilion; Los Angeles, California
Feb 18, 1995	No. 13	at USC	W 74–70	19–6 (9–4)	L.A. Sports Arena; Los Angeles, California
Feb 23, 1995	No. 15	Oregon	L 72–73	19–7 (9–5)	ASU Activity Center; Tempe, Arizona
Feb 25, 1995	No. 15	Oregon State	W 82–44	20–7 (10–5)	ASU Activity Center; Tempe, Arizona
Mar 2, 1995	No. 15	at Washington	W 72–71	21–7 (11–5)	Bank of America Arena; Seattle, Washington
Mar 4, 1995	No. 15	at Washington State	L 71–84	21–8 (11–6)	Friel Court; Pullman, Washington
Mar 11, 1995	No. 18	at No. 12 Arizona	W 103–98 ^{2OT}	22–8 (12–6)	McKale Center; Tucson, Arizona
NCAA Tournament
Mar 16, 1995*	(5 SE) No. 16	vs. (12 SE) Ball State; First round	W 81–66	23–8	Memphis Pyramid; Memphis, Tennessee
Mar 18, 1995*	(5 SE) No. 16	vs. (13 SE) Manhattan; Second Round	W 64–54	24–8	Memphis Pyramid (19,120); Memphis, Tennessee
Mar 23, 1995*	(5 SE) No. 16	vs. (1 SE) No. 2 Kentucky; Southeast Regional semifinal – Sweet Sixteen	L 73–97	24–9	Birmingham-Jefferson Civic Center (17,458); Birmingham, Alabama
*Non-conference game. ^{#}Rankings from AP Poll. (#) Tournament seedings in parentheses. SE=Southeast.

== NBA draft ==
Round	Pick	Player	NBA Team
1	27	Mario Bennett	Phoenix Suns
