= 1994–95 Oklahoma State Cowboys basketball team =

American college basketball season

1994–95 Oklahoma State Cowboys basketball

Big Eight tournament champions

NCAA men's Division I tournament, Final Four
- Conference: Big Eight Conference

Ranking
- Coaches: No. 4
- AP: No. 14
- Record: 27–10 (10–4 Big Eight)
- Head coach: Eddie Sutton (5th season)
- Assistant coaches: Sean Sutton; John Pelphrey; Paul Graham
- Home arena: Gallagher-Iba Arena (Capacity: 6,381)

1994–95 Big Eight Conference men's basketball standings
| | Conf. | | | | Overall |
| Team | W | | L | PCT | W | | L | PCT |
|---|---|---|---|---|---|---|---|---|
| No. 5 Kansas | 11 | – | 3 | .786 | 25 | – | 6 | .806 |
| No. 14 Oklahoma State † | 10 | – | 4 | .714 | 27 | – | 10 | .730 |
| No. 17 Oklahoma | 9 | – | 5 | .643 | 23 | – | 9 | .719 |
| No. 23 Missouri | 8 | – | 6 | .571 | 20 | – | 9 | .690 |
| Iowa State | 6 | – | 8 | .429 | 23 | – | 11 | .676 |
| Colorado | 5 | – | 9 | .357 | 15 | – | 13 | .536 |
| Nebraska | 4 | – | 10 | .286 | 18 | – | 14 | .563 |
| Kansas State | 3 | – | 11 | .214 | 12 | – | 15 | .444 |
† 1995 Big Eight tournament winner As of April 4, 1995; Rankings from AP poll

The 1994–95 Oklahoma State Cowboys basketball team represented Oklahoma State University as a member of the Big Eight Conference during the 1994–95 NCAA Division I men's basketball season.

== Schedule and results ==
| Date time, TV | Rank^{#} | Opponent^{#} | Result | Record | Site (attendance) city, state |
Regular season
| Nov 23, 1994* | No. 19 | vs. BYU; Great Alaska Shootout | L 59–69 | 0–1 | Sullivan Arena; Anchorage, Alaska |
| Nov 25, 1994* | No. 19 | vs. Jackson State; Great Alaska Shootout | W 75–57 | 1–1 | Sullivan Arena; Anchorage, Alaska |
| Nov 26, 1994* | No. 19 | vs. No. 5 Arizona; Great Alaska Shootout | L 63–73 | 1–2 | Sullivan Arena; Anchorage, Alaska |
| Nov 30, 1994* | | SMU | W 73–51 | 2–2 | Gallagher-Iba Arena; Stillwater, Oklahoma |
| Dec 2, 1994* | | vs. Appalachian State | W 85–58 | 3–2 | Mabee Center; Tulsa, Oklahoma |
| Dec 3, 1994* | | vs. Texas A&M | W 86–56 | 4–2 | Mabee Center; Tulsa, Oklahoma |
| Dec 7, 1994* | | Tulsa | W 93–88 | 5–2 | Gallagher-Iba Arena; Stillwater, Oklahoma |
| Dec 9, 1994* | | Northwest Missouri State | W 91–53 | 6–2 | Gallagher-Iba Arena; Stillwater, Oklahoma |
| Dec 17, 1994* | | Texas–Pan American | W 82–72 | 7–2 | Gallagher-Iba Arena; Stillwater, Oklahoma |
| Dec 20, 1994* | | vs. LSU | W 111–67 | 8–2 | Mabee Center; Tulsa, Oklahoma |
| Dec 22, 1994* | | at No. 15 Arizona State | L 69–72 | 8–3 | ASU Activity Center; Tempe, Arizona |
| Dec 28, 1994* | | at Providence | L 78–93 | 8–4 | Providence Civic Center; Providence, Rhode Island |
| Jan 2, 1995* | | Alaska Anchorage | W 112–72 | 9–4 | Gallagher-Iba Arena; Stillwater, Oklahoma |
| Jan 7, 1995 | | at Kansas State | L 66–74 | 9–5 (0–1) | Bramlage Coliseum; Manhattan, Kansas |
| Jan 11, 1995* | | at Oral Roberts | W 84–45 | 10–5 | Mabee Center; Tulsa, Oklahoma |
| Jan 14, 1995* | | at No. 11 Michigan State | L 69–70 | 10–6 | Breslin Student Events Center; East Lansing, Michigan |
| Jan 16, 1995 | | Oklahoma | W 72–64 | 11–6 (1–1) | Gallagher-Iba Arena; Stillwater, Oklahoma |
| Jan 22, 1995 | | No. 16 Missouri | W 85–70 | 12–6 (2–1) | Gallagher-Iba Arena; Stillwater, Oklahoma |
| Jan 28, 1995 | | at Colorado | W 82–63 | 13–6 (3–1) | Coors Events Center; Boulder, Colorado |
| Feb 1, 1995 | | at Nebraska | W 82–65 | 14–6 (4–1) | Bob Devaney Sports Center; Lincoln, Nebraska |
| Feb 4, 1995 | | Colorado | W 94–67 | 15–6 (5–1) | Gallagher-Iba Arena; Stillwater, Oklahoma |
| Feb 6, 1995 | | No. 2 Kansas | W 79–69 | 16–6 (6–1) | Gallagher-Iba Arena; Stillwater, Oklahoma |
| Feb 11, 1995 | No. 24 | at No. 13 Missouri | L 79–81 | 16–7 (6–2) | Hearnes Center; Columbia, Missouri |
| Feb 15, 1995 | No. 22 | at No. 21 Iowa State | W 71–69 | 17–7 (7–2) | Hilton Coliseum; Ames, Iowa |
| Feb 18, 1995 | No. 22 | Nebraska | W 93–53 | 18–7 (8–2) | Gallagher-Iba Arena; Stillwater, Oklahoma |
| Feb 22, 1995 | No. 18 | Kansas State | W 70–46 | 19–7 (9–2) | Gallagher-Iba Arena; Stillwater, Oklahoma |
| Feb 25, 1995 | No. 18 | at No. 25 Oklahoma | L 74–82 ^{OT} | 19–8 (9–3) | Lloyd Noble Center; Norman, Oklahoma |
| Feb 27, 1995 | No. 18 | No. 24 Iowa State | W 77–49 | 20–8 (10–3) | Gallagher-Iba Arena; Stillwater, Oklahoma |
| Mar 5, 1995 | No. 18 | at No. 3 Kansas | L 62–78 | 20–9 (10–4) | Allen Fieldhouse; Lawrence, Kansas |
Big Eight tournament
| Mar 10, 1995* | (2) No. 19 | vs. (7) Nebraska; Quarterfinals | W 68–48 | 21–9 | Kemper Arena; Kansas City, Missouri |
| Mar 11, 1995* | (2) No. 19 | vs. (3) No. 16 Oklahoma; Semifinals | W 74–58 | 22–9 | Kemper Arena; Kansas City, Missouri |
| Mar 12, 1995* | (2) No. 19 | vs. (5) Iowa State; Championship game | W 62–53 | 23–9 | Kemper Arena; Kansas City, Missouri |
NCAA tournament
| Mar 16, 1995* | (4 E) No. 14 | vs. (13 E) Drexel | W 73–49 | 24–9 | Baltimore Arena; Baltimore, Maryland |
| Mar 18, 1995* | (4 E) No. 14 | vs. (5 E) No. 20 Alabama | W 66–52 | 25–9 | Baltimore Arena; Baltimore, Maryland |
| Mar 24, 1995* | (4 E) No. 14 | vs. (1 E) No. 3 Wake Forest; East Regional semifinal – Sweet Sixteen | W 71–66 | 26–9 | Brendan Byrne Arena; East Rutherford, New Jersey |
| Mar 26, 1995* | (4 E) No. 14 | vs. (2 E) No. 7 UMass; East Regional final – Elite Eight | W 68–54 | 27–9 | Brendan Byrne Arena; East Rutherford, New Jersey |
| Apr 1, 1995* | (4 E) No. 14 | vs. (1 W) No. 1 UCLA; National semifinal – Final Four | L 61–74 | 27–10 | Kingdome; Seattle, Washington |
*Non-conference game. ^{#}Rankings from AP poll. (#) Tournament seedings in parentheses. MW=Midwest. All times are in Central Time.

=== NCAA tournament ===
- West
  - Oklahoma State (4) 73, Drexel (13) 49
  - Oklahoma State 66, Alabama (5) 52
  - Oklahoma State 71, Wake Forest (1) 66
  - Oklahoma State 68, Massachusetts (2) 54
- Final Four
  - UCLA 74, Oklahoma State 61

=== Player stats ===
| Player | Games | Minutes | Field Goals | Free Throws | Rebounds | Assists | Blocks | Steals | Points |
|---|---|---|---|---|---|---|---|---|---|
| Bryant Reeves | 37 | 1288 | 289 | 219 | 350 | 30 | 60 | 18 | 797 |
| Randy Rutherford | 37 | 1348 | 238 (146 3-Pt.) | 102 | 232 | 64 | 5 | 69 | 724 |

== Awards and honors ==
- Bryant Reeves, Big 8 Player of the Year

== Team players drafted into the NBA ==
One player from the roster was picked in an NBA draft:

| Year | Round | Pick | Player | NBA club |
|---|---|---|---|---|
| 1995 | 1 | 6 | Bryant Reeves | Vancouver Grizzlies |
