= 1994–95 Washington State Cougars men's basketball team =

American college basketball season

1994–95 Washington State Cougars men's basketball

National Invitation Tournament, Quarterfinal
- Conference: Pacific-10 Conference
- Record: 18–12 (10–8 Pac-10)
- Head coach: Kevin Eastman (1st season)
- Home arena: Beasley Coliseum

1994–95 Pacific-10 Conference men's basketball standings
	Conf.				Overall
Team	W		L	PCT	W		L	PCT
No. 1 UCLA	17	–	1	.944	32	–	1	.970
No. 15 Arizona	14	–	4	.778	24	–	7	.774
No. 16 Arizona State	12	–	6	.667	24	–	9	.727
Oregon	11	–	7	.611	19	–	9	.679
Stanford	10	–	8	.556	20	–	9	.690
Washington State	10	–	8	.556	18	–	12	.600
Washington	6	–	12	.333	10	–	17	.370
Oregon State	6	–	12	.333	9	–	18	.333
USC	4	–	14	.222	9	–	19	.321
California^{1}	0	–	18	.000	0	–	27	.000
As of November 23, 2011; Rankings from AP Poll^{1}California forfeited all wins due to infractions.

The 1994–95 Washington State Cougars men's basketball team represented Washington State University for the 1994–95 NCAA Division I men's basketball season. Led by first-year head coach Kevin Eastman, the Cougars were members of the Pacific-10 Conference and played their home games on campus at Beasley Coliseum in Pullman, Washington.

The Cougars were 16–11 overall in the regular season and 10–8 in conference play, tied for fifth in the standings. There was no conference tournament this season; last played in 1990, it resumed in 2002.

For the second time, Washington State played in the National Invitation Tournament, and advanced to the quarterfinals.

Eastman, who previously led UNC Wilmington, was hired in May 1994.

== Postseason results ==
Date time, TV	Opponent	Result	Record	Site (attendance) city, state
National Invitation Tournament
Wed, March 15*; 9:00 pm, ESPN	Texas Tech; First round	W 94–82	17–11	Beasley Coliseum (5,200); Pullman, Washington
Mon, March 20*; 5:00 pm	at Illinois State; Second round	W 83–80	18–11	Redbird Arena (8,751); Normal, Illinois
Thu, March 23*; 4:30 pm	at Canisius; Quarterfinal	L 80–89	18–12	Memorial Auditorium (9,065); Buffalo, New York
*Non-conference game. ^{#}Rankings from AP poll. (#) Tournament seedings in parentheses. All times are in Pacific time.
