= 1994–95 Stanford Cardinal men's basketball team =

American college basketball season

1994–95 Stanford Cardinal men's basketball

NCAA tournament, second round
- Conference: Pacific-10 Conference
- Record: 20–9 (10–8 Pac-10)
- Head coach: Mike Montgomery (9th season)
- Assistant coaches: Doug Oliver; Jeff Jackson
- Home arena: Maples Pavilion (Capacity: 7,392)

1994–95 Pacific-10 Conference men's basketball standings
	Conf.				Overall
Team	W		L	PCT	W		L	PCT
No. 1 UCLA	17	–	1	.944	32	–	1	.970
No. 15 Arizona	14	–	4	.778	24	–	7	.774
No. 16 Arizona State	12	–	6	.667	24	–	9	.727
Oregon	11	–	7	.611	19	–	9	.679
Stanford	10	–	8	.556	20	–	9	.690
Washington State	10	–	8	.556	18	–	12	.600
Washington	6	–	12	.333	10	–	17	.370
Oregon State	6	–	12	.333	9	–	18	.333
USC	4	–	14	.222	9	–	19	.321
California^{1}	0	–	18	.000	0	–	27	.000
As of November 23, 2011; Rankings from AP Poll^{1}California forfeited all wins due to infractions.

The 1994–95 Stanford Cardinal men's basketball team represented Stanford University as a member of the Pac-10 Conference during the 1994–95 NCAA Division I men's basketball season. The team was led by head coach Mike Montgomery and played their home games at Maples Pavilion. Stanford finished fifth in the Pac-10 regular season standings and received an at-large bid to the 1995 NCAA tournament. Playing as the No. 10 seed in the East region, the Cardinal defeated No. 7 seed UNC Charlotte in the opening round before falling to No. 2 seed UMass in the second round. Stanford finished with an overall record of 20–9 (10–8 Pac-10).

== Roster ==
1994–95 Stanford Cardinal men's basketball team
Players
Coaches

Pos.	#	Name	Height	Weight	Year	Previous school	Hometown
G	4	Dion Cross	6 ft 2 in (1.88 m)	—	Jr
G	10	Mark Thompson	6 ft 2 in (1.88 m)	—	Fr
G	11	Warren Gravely	6 ft 3 in (1.91 m)	—	Sr
G	15	Dave Bennion	6 ft 3 in (1.91 m)	—	Fr
G	22	Brevin Knight	5 ft 10 in (1.78 m)	170 lb (77 kg)	So	Seton Hall Prep	Livingston, NJ
F	24	Rich Jackson	6 ft 6 in (1.98 m)	—	So		Provo, UT
G	25	David Harbour	6 ft 3 in (1.91 m)	—	Jr
F	30	Darren Allaway	6 ft 8 in (2.03 m)	—	Jr
F	32	Andy Poppink (C)	6 ft 7 in (2.01 m)	—	RS Jr
G	35	Kamba Tshionyi	6 ft 2 in (1.88 m)	—	Fr		Eugene, OR
F	44	Todd Manley	6 ft 9 in (2.06 m)	—	Sr
C	45	Bart Lammersen (C)	6 ft 9 in (2.06 m)	—	Sr
C	55	Tim Young	7 ft 0 in (2.13 m)	220 lb (100 kg)	Fr	Harbor	Santa Cruz, CA

Head coach

- Mike Montgomery (Long Beach State)

Assistant coach(es)

- Doug Oliver (San José State)
- Jeff Jackson (Cornell)

Legend

- (C) Team captain
- (S) Suspended
- (I) Ineligible
- (W) Walk-on
- Injured
- Current redshirt

Roster

== Schedule and results ==
Date time, TV	Rank^{#}	Opponent^{#}	Result	Record	Site (attendance) city, state
Non-conference regular season
November 25, 1994*		Colgate; Fry's Invitational	W 82–70	1–0	Maples Pavilion; Stanford, CA
November 26, 1994*		St. Peters; Fry's Invitational	W 79–71	2–0	Maples Pavilion; Stanford, CA
December 3, 1994*		San Jose State	W 68–52	3–0	Maples Pavilion; Stanford, CA
December 10, 1994*		Cal Poly	W 94–52	4–0	Maples Pavilion; Stanford, CA
December 16, 1994*		San Francisco	W 98–60	5–0	Maples Pavilion; Stanford, CA
December 19, 1994*		at American	W 97–71	6–0	Bender Arena; Washington, D.C.
December 22, 1994*		at No. 22 Virginia	W 64–60	7–0	University Hall; Charlottesville, VA
December 27, 1994*		No. 19 Wisconsin	W 95–78	8–0	Maples Pavilion; Stanford, CC
December 29, 1994*		Cornell	W 67–55	9–0	Maples Pavilion; Stanford, CA
Pac–10 Conference regular season
January 5, 1995	No. 23	at Washington	W 65–51	10–0 (1–0)	Hec Edmundson Pavilion; Seattle, WA
January 7, 1995	No. 23	at Washington State	L 63–77	10–1 (1–1)	Beasley Coliseum; Pullman, WA
January 12, 1995		No. 12 Arizona State	W 91–75	11–1 (2–1)	Maples Pavilion; Stanford, CA
January 14, 1995		No. 13 Arizona	L 83–89 ^{OT}	11–2 (2–2)	Maples Pavilion; Stanford, CA
January 19, 1995	No. 21	at California	W 78–73	12–2 (3–2)	Harmon Gym; Berkeley, CA
January 26, 1995	No. 17	at No. 4 UCLA	L 74–77	12–3 (3–3)	Pauley Pavilion; Los Angeles, CA
January 28, 1995	No. 17	at USC	W 85–82	13–3 (4–3)	L. A. Sports Arena; Los Angeles, CA
February 2, 1995	No. 17	No. 22 Oregon	W 92–87	14–3 (5–3)	Maples Pavilion; Stanford, CA
February 4, 1995	No. 17	Oregon State	W 95–82	15–3 (6–3)	Maples Pavilion; Stanford, CA
February 9, 1995	No. 15	at No. 9 Arizona	L 73–84	15–4 (6–4)	McKale Center; Tucson, AZ
February 11, 1995	No. 15	at No. 14 Arizona State	L 70–79	15–5 (6–5)	ASU Activity Center; Tempe, AZ
February 15, 1995	No. 17	California	W 83–70	16–5 (7–5)	Maples Pavilion; Stanford, CA
February 21, 1995	No. 19	No. 1 UCLA	L 77–88	16–6 (7–6)	Maples Pavilion; Stanford, CA
February 23, 1995	No. 19	USC	W 90–78	17–6 (8–6)	Maples Pavilion; Stanford, CA
March 2, 1995	No. 20	at Oregon State	L 71–90	17–7 (8–7)	Gill Coliseum; Corvallis, OR
March 4, 1995	No. 20	at Oregon	L 80–89	17–8 (8–8)	McArthur Court; Eugene, OR
March 9, 1995		Washington State	W 79–72	18–8 (9–8)	Maples Pavilion; Stanford, CA
March 11, 1995		Washington	W 74–65	19–8 (10–8)	Maples Pavilion; Stanford, CA
NCAA tournament
March 17, 1995*	(10 E)	vs. (7 E) UNC Charlotte; First Round	W 70–68	20–8	Knickerbocker Arena; Albany, NY
March 19, 1995*	(10 E)	vs. (2 E) No. 7 UMass; Second Round	L 53–75	20–9	Knickerbocker Arena (11,931); Albany, NY
*Non-conference game. ^{#}Rankings from AP Poll. (#) Tournament seedings in parentheses. E=East. All times are in Pacific Time. (#) during NCAA is seed within region.

Schedule Source:

== Rankings ==
Ranking movements Legend: ██ Increase in ranking ██ Decrease in ranking — = Not ranked RV = Received votes
	Week																		
Poll	Pre	1	2	3	4	5	6	7	8	9	10	11	12	13	14	15	16	17	Final
AP	—	—	—	—	—	RV	RV	23	RV	21	17	17	15	17	19	20	—	—	Not released
Coaches	—	—*	—	—	—	—	—	RV	RV	23	19	18	16	19	18	19	24	25	RV

*Coaches did not release a week 1 poll.

== Awards and honors ==
Team honors
Honors	Player	Position	Ref.
The Hank Luisetti MVP	Brevin Knight	G	
Howie Dallmar Coaches Award	Bart Lammersen	C	
Howie Dallmar Coaches Award	Andy Poppink	F	
Most Inspirational Player	David Harbour	G	
Most Improved Player	Tim Young	C	
Best Defensive Player	Darren Allaway	F	
