= 1994–95 Washington Huskies men's basketball team =

American college basketball season

1994–95 Washington Huskies men's basketball
- Conference: Pacific-10 Conference
- Record: 10–17 (6–12 Pac-10)
- Head coach: Bob Bender (2nd season)
- Assistant coaches: Ray Giacoletti; Ritchie McKay
- Home arena: Hec Edmundson Pavilion

1994–95 Pacific-10 Conference men's basketball standings
	Conf.				Overall
Team	W		L	PCT	W		L	PCT
No. 1 UCLA	17	–	1	.944	32	–	1	.970
No. 15 Arizona	14	–	4	.778	24	–	7	.774
No. 16 Arizona State	12	–	6	.667	24	–	9	.727
Oregon	11	–	7	.611	19	–	9	.679
Stanford	10	–	8	.556	20	–	9	.690
Washington State	10	–	8	.556	18	–	12	.600
Washington	6	–	12	.333	10	–	17	.370
Oregon State	6	–	12	.333	9	–	18	.333
USC	4	–	14	.222	9	–	19	.321
California^{1}	0	–	18	.000	0	–	27	.000
As of November 23, 2011; Rankings from AP Poll^{1}California forfeited all wins due to infractions.

The 1994–95 Washington Huskies men's basketball team represented the University of Washington for the 1994–95 NCAA Division I men's basketball season. Led by second-year head coach Bob Bender, the Huskies were members of the Pacific-10 Conference and played their home games on campus at Hec Edmundson Pavilion in Seattle, Washington.

The Huskies were 9–18 overall in the regular season and 5–13 in conference play, tied for eighth in the standings. California (13–14, 5–13) later forfeited its wins, which improved Washington's record to 10–17 and 6–12, tied for seventh in the Pac-10. There was no conference tournament this season; last played in 1990, it resumed in 2002.

This season's Final Four was held in Seattle at the Kingdome.
