= Bill Frieder =

American college basketball coach

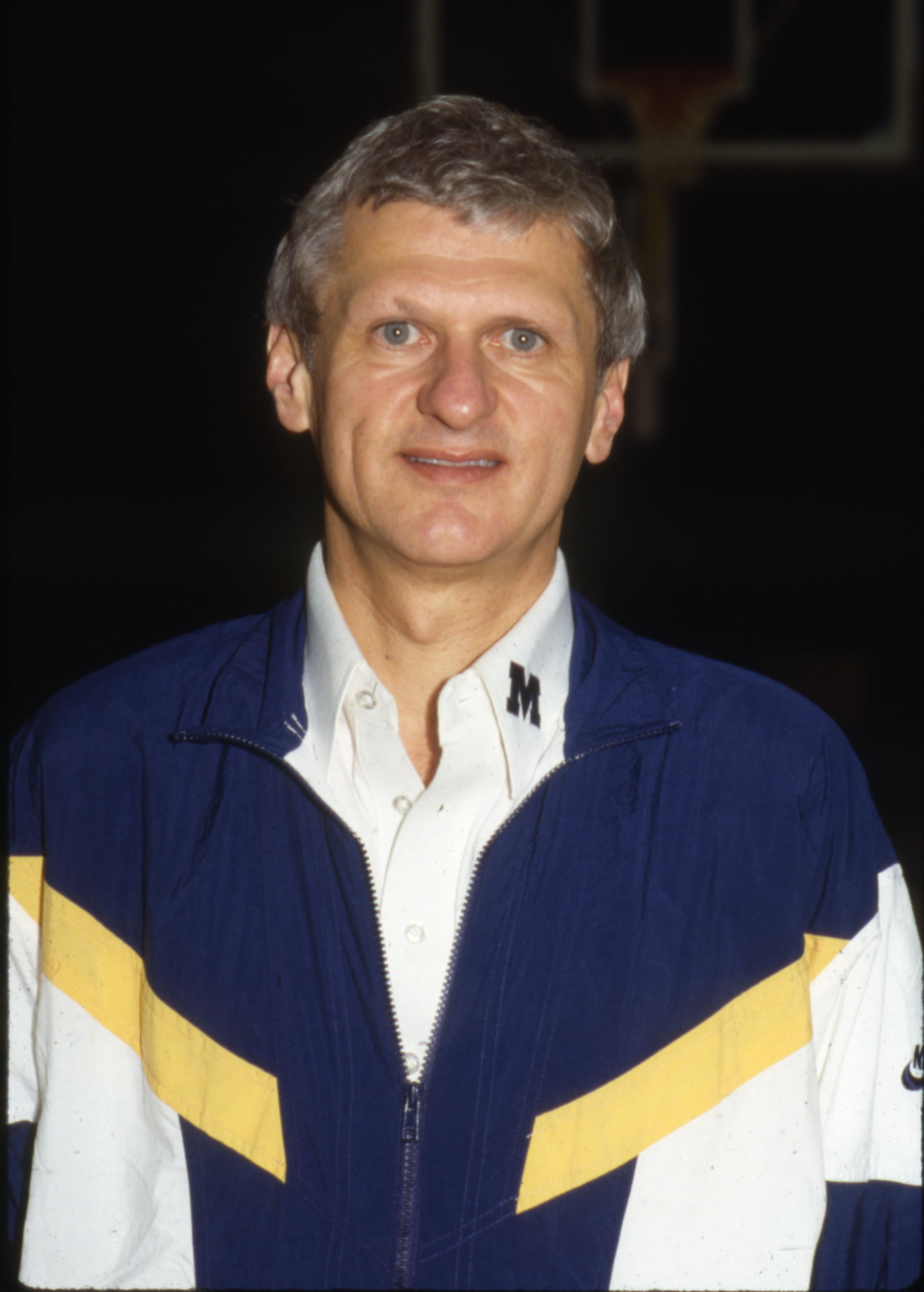
- Frieder in 1988

Biographical details
- Born: March 3, 1942 (age 84); Saginaw, Michigan, U.S.
- Education: Michigan

Coaching career (HC unless noted)
- 1973–1980: Michigan (assistant)
- 1980–1989: Michigan
- 1989–1997: Arizona State

Head coaching record
- Overall: 318–197
- Tournaments: 8–6 (NCAA Division I); 8–5 (NIT)

Accomplishments and honors

Championships
- NIT (1984); 2 Big Ten regular season (1985, 1986)

Awards
- AP Coach of the Year (1985); Big Ten Coach of the Year (1985)

William Samuel Frieder (born March 3, 1942) is a former basketball coach at Michigan (1981–1989) and Arizona State (1989–1997). Frieder's 1985–86 team was the last Michigan team to win a Big Ten Championship until the 2011–12 team.

Just before the 1989 NCAA tournament, Frieder announced that he would leave Michigan for Arizona State at the end of the season. Michigan athletic director Bo Schembechler ordered Frieder to leave immediately, and named top assistant Steve Fisher as the interim coach for the tournament. Schembechler famously announced, "A Michigan man will coach Michigan, not an Arizona State man." The Wolverines went on to win the tournament and Fisher was officially given the head coaching job. Michigan credits the 1988–89 team's regular season to Frieder and the NCAA tournament to Fisher.

Frieder resigned from Arizona State in 1997 following a point-shaving scandal that involved games from the school’s 1994 season.

== Personal ==
Frieder was born and raised in Saginaw, Michigan and is a 1964 graduate of the University of Michigan's Ross School of Business.

During the 1990s, Frieder and Lute Olson, then coach of the Arizona Wildcats, participated in a series of television commercials together for Bank One.

== Head coaching record ==
Record table
| Season | Team | Overall | Conference | Standing | Postseason |
|---|---|---|---|---|---|
Michigan Wolverines (Big Ten Conference) (1980–1989)
| 1980–81 | Michigan | 19–11 | 8–10 | 7th | NIT Quarterfinal |
| 1981–82 | Michigan | 7–20 | 7–11 | T–7th | |
| 1982–83 | Michigan | 15–13 | 7–11 | 9th | |
| 1983–84 | Michigan | 23–10 | 11–7 | 4th | NIT Champion |
| 1984–85 | Michigan | 26–4 | 16–2 | 1st | NCAA Division I Second Round |
| 1985–86 | Michigan | 28–5 | 14–4 | 1st | NCAA Division I Second Round |
| 1986–87 | Michigan | 20–12 | 10–8 | 5th | NCAA Division I Second Round |
| 1987–88 | Michigan | 26–8 | 13–5 | 2nd | NCAA Division I Sweet 16 |
| 1988–89 | Michigan | 24–7 | 12–6 | 3rd | fired (Note: Frieder was fired prior to the 1989 NCAA Division I men's basketball tournament.) |
| Michigan: | | 188–90 | 102–64 | | |
Arizona State Sun Devils (Pacific-10 Conference) (1989–1997)
| 1989–90 | Arizona State | 15–16 | 6–12 | T–7th | NIT First Round |
| 1990–91 | Arizona State | 20–10 | 10–8 | T–3rd | NCAA Division I Second Round |
| 1991–92 | Arizona State | 19–14 | 9–9 | T–5th | NIT Second Round |
| 1992–93 | Arizona State | 18–10 | 11–7 | T–3rd | NIT First Round |
| 1993–94 | Arizona State | 15–13 | 10–8 | T–4th | NIT First Round |
| 1994–95 | Arizona State | 24–9* | 12–6 | 3rd | NCAA Division I Sweet 16 |
| 1995–96 | Arizona State | 11–16 | 6–12 | 8th | |
| 1996–97 | Arizona State | 10–20 | 2–16 | 10th | |
| Arizona State: | | 130–107** | 66–78 | | |
| Total: | | 318–197*** | | | |
National champion Postseason invitational champion Conference regular season champion Conference regular season and conference tournament champion Division regular season champion Division regular season and conference tournament champion Conference tournament champion

Frieder was fired prior to coaching in the 1989 NCAA Tournament
* 2 NCAA Tournament wins and 1 NCAA Tournament loss were later vacated
** Record at Arizona State includes vacated games
*** Final record includes vacated games

== Bibliography ==
- Cummings, D. L. (1995). "Frieder Looks on Sunny Side at Arizona State." New York Daily News. March 22.
- (1997). "Frieder Resigns at Arizona State." The New York Times. September 11.
- (1988) "Basket Case – The Frenetic Life of Michigan Coach Bill Frieder" by Bill Frieder with Jeff Mortimer
- ESPN College Basketball Encyclopedia (2009)
