= List of VCU Rams men's basketball seasons =

The VCU Rams men's college basketball team competes in the National Collegiate Athletic Association's (NCAA) Division I, representing Virginia Commonwealth University in the Atlantic 10 Conference. VCU has played its home games at Stuart C. Siegel Center in Richmond, Virginia since its opening in 1999.

== Seasons ==
Record table
Season	Coach	Overall	Conference	Standing	Postseason
Benny Dees (Independent) (1968–1970)
1968–69	Benny Dees	12–11			
1969–70	Benny Dees	13–10			
Chuck Noe (Independent) (1970–1976)
1970–71	Chuck Noe	15–9			
1971–72	Chuck Noe	15–4			
1972–73	Chuck Noe	15–5			
1973–74	Chuck Noe	17–7			
1974–75	Chuck Noe	17–8			
1975–76	Chuck Noe	16–9			
Dana Kirk (Independent) (1976–1979)
1976–77	Dana Kirk	13–13			
1977–78	Dana Kirk	24–5			NIT first round
1978–79	Dana Kirk	20–5			
J.D. Barnett (Sun Belt Conference) (1979–1985)
1979–80	J.D. Barnett	18–12	8–6	5th	NCAA Division I first round
1980–81	J.D. Barnett	24–5	9–3	T–1st	NCAA Division I second round
1981–82	J.D. Barnett	17–11	7–3	2nd	
1982–83	J.D. Barnett	24–7	12–2	T–1st	NCAA Division I second round
1983–84	J.D. Barnett	23–7	11–3	1st	NCAA Division I second round
1984–85	J.D. Barnett	26–6	12–2	1st	NCAA Division I second round
Mike Pollio (Sun Belt Conference) (1985–1989)
1985–86	Mike Pollio	12–16	6–8	5th	
1986–87	Mike Pollio	17–14	7–7	4th	
1987–88	Mike Pollio	23–12	10–4	2nd	NIT quarterfinal
1988–89	Mike Pollio	13–15	9–5	3rd	
Sonny Smith (Sun Belt Conference) (1989–1991)
1989–90	Sonny Smith	11–17	5–9	T–6th	
1990–91	Sonny Smith	14–17	7–7	5th	
Sonny Smith (Metro Conference) (1991–1995)
1991–92	Sonny Smith	14–15	5–7	T–5th	
1992–93	Sonny Smith	20–10	7–5	3rd	NIT first round
1993–94	Sonny Smith	14–13	5–7	T–5th	
1994–95	Sonny Smith	16–14	3–9	7th	
Sonny Smith (Colonial Athletic Association) (1995–1998)
1995–96	Sonny Smith	24–9	14–2	1st	NCAA Division I first round
1996–97	Sonny Smith	14–13	9–7	T–3rd	
1997–98	Sonny Smith	9–19	4–12	9th	
Mack McCarthy (Colonial Athletic Association) (1998–2002)
1998–99	Mack McCarthy	15–16	8–8	6th	
1999–00	Mack McCarthy	14–14	7–9	5th	
2000–01	Mack McCarthy	16–14	9–7	4th	
2001–02	Mack McCarthy	21–11	11–7	3rd	
Jeff Capel (Colonial Athletic Association) (2002–2006)
2002–03	Jeff Capel	18–10	12–6	T–2nd	
2003–04	Jeff Capel	23–8	14–4	1st	NCAA Division I first round
2004–05	Jeff Capel	19–13	13–5	T–2nd	NIT Opening Round
2005–06	Jeff Capel	19–10	11–7	5th	
Anthony Grant (Colonial Athletic Association) (2006–2009)
2006–07	Anthony Grant	28–7	16–2	1st	NCAA Division I second round
2007–08	Anthony Grant	24–8	15–3	1st	NIT first round
2008–09	Anthony Grant	24–10	14–4	1st	NCAA Division I first round
Shaka Smart (Colonial Athletic Association) (2009–2012)
2009–10	Shaka Smart	27–9	11–7	T–5th	CBI Champion
2010–11	Shaka Smart	28–12	12–6	4th	NCAA Division I Final Four
2011–12	Shaka Smart	29–7	15–3	2nd	NCAA Division I second round
Shaka Smart (Atlantic 10 Conference) (2012–2015)
2012–13	Shaka Smart	27–9	12–4	2nd	NCAA Division I third round
2013–14	Shaka Smart	26–9	12–4	2nd	NCAA Division I second round
2014–15	Shaka Smart	26–10	12–6	T–4th	NCAA Division I second round
Will Wade (Atlantic 10 Conference) (2015–2017)
2015–16	Will Wade	25–11	14–4	T–1st	NCAA Division I second round
2016–17	Will Wade	26–9	14–4	2nd	NCAA Division I first round
Mike Rhoades (Atlantic 10 Conference) (2017–2023)
2017–18	Mike Rhoades	18–15	9–9	T–5th	
2018–19	Mike Rhoades	25–8	16–2	1st	NCAA Division I first round
2019–20	Mike Rhoades	18–13	8–10	T–8th	No postseason held
2020–21	Mike Rhoades	19–7	10–4	2nd	NCAA Division I first round
2021–22	Mike Rhoades	22–10	14–4	2nd	NIT second round
2022–23	Mike Rhoades	27–8	15–3	1st	NCAA Division I first round
Ryan Odom (Atlantic 10 Conference) (2023–2025)
2023–24	Ryan Odom	24–14	11–7	T–4th	NIT Quarterfinals
2024–25	Ryan Odom	28–7	15–3	T–1st	NCAA Division I first round
Phil Martelli Jr. (Atlantic 10 Conference) (2025–present)
2025–26	Phil Martelli Jr.	28–7	15–3	T–1st	NCAA Division I second round
2026–27	Phil Martelli Jr.	1-0	0-0		
Total:		1084–565			
National champion Postseason invitational champion Conference regular season champion Conference regular season and conference tournament champion Division regular season champion Division regular season and conference tournament champion Conference tournament champion
