= 1994–95 NCAA Division I men's basketball season =

Basketball season

- Preseason AP No. 1: Arkansas Razorbacks
- Regular season: November 1994 – April 1995
- NCAA Tournament: 1995
- Tournament dates: March 16 – April 3, 1995
- National Championship: Kingdome; Seattle, Washington
- NCAA Champions: UCLA Bruins
- Other champions: Virginia Tech Hokies (NIT)
- Player of the Year (Naismith, Wooden): Joe Smith, Maryland Terrapins (Naismith); Ed O'Bannon, UCLA Bruins (Wooden)

The 1994–95 NCAA Division I men's basketball season began in November 1994 and concluded with the 64-team 1995 NCAA Division I men's basketball tournament, whose finals were held at the Kingdome in Seattle, Washington. The UCLA Bruins earned their eleventh national championship by defeating the Arkansas Razorbacks 89–78 on April 3, 1995. They were coached by Jim Harrick, and the NCAA Division I basketball tournament Most Outstanding Player was UCLA's Ed O'Bannon.

In the 32-team 1995 National Invitation Tournament, the Virginia Tech Hokies defeated the Marquette Warriors at Madison Square Garden in New York City.

Following the season, the 1995 NCAA Men's Basketball All-American Consensus First Team included Ed O'Bannon, Shawn Respert, Joe Smith, Jerry Stackhouse, and Damon Stoudamire.

== Season headlines ==
- The American West Conference began play, with four original members.
- On February 13, 1995, Connecticut became the first school ranked No. 1 in both men's and women's basketball at the same time.
- In the 1995 NCAA tournament, two former NCAA basketball tournament Most Outstanding Player award winners returned to the Final Four for the first time. They were 1993 winner Donald Williams of North Carolina and 1994 winner Corliss Williamson of Arkansas.
- Jim Harrick led the UCLA Bruins to their eleventh national championship, his first.
- The 1994–95 season was the last season of play for the Great Midwest Conference and the Metro Conference, which merged after the season to form Conference USA.

== Pre-season polls ==
The top 25 from the pre-season AP Poll.

Associated Press
Ranking	Team
1	Arkansas
2	North Carolina
3	Massachusetts
4	Kentucky
5	Arizona
6	UCLA
7	Maryland
8	Duke
9	Indiana
10	Florida
11	Kansas
12	Syracuse
13	Cincinnati
14	Virginia
15	Georgetown
16	Michigan
17	Wisconsin
18	Alabama
19	Connecticut
20	Michigan State
21	Oklahoma State
22	Villanova
23	Georgia Tech
24	Wake Forest
25	Illinois

== Conference membership changes ==
These schools joined new conferences for the 1994–95 season.

School	Former conference	New conference
Buffalo Bulls	East Coast Conference	Mid-Continent Conference
Cal Poly Mustangs	California Collegiate Athletic Association (D-II)	American West Conference
Cal State Northridge Matadors	NCAA Division I Independent	American West Conference
Campbell Fighting Camels	Big South Conference	Trans America Athletic Conference
Central Connecticut State Blue Devils	East Coast Conference	Mid-Continent Conference
Chicago State Cougars	East Coast Conference	Mid-Continent Conference
Cleveland State Vikings	Mid-Continent Conference	Midwestern Collegiate Conference
Evansville Purple Aces	Midwestern Collegiate Conference	Missouri Valley Conference
Green Bay Phoenix	Mid-Continent Conference	Midwestern Collegiate Conference
Hofstra Flying Dutchmen	East Coast Conference	North Atlantic Conference
Illinois Chicago (UIC) Flames	Mid-Continent Conference	Midwestern Collegiate Conference
Milwaukee Panthers	Mid-Continent Conference	Midwestern Collegiate Conference
Missouri–Kansas City (UMKC) Kangaroos	NCAA Division I Independent	Mid-Continent Conference
Northeastern Illinois Golden Eagles	East Coast Conference	Mid-Continent Conference
Northern Illinois Huskies	Mid-Continent Conference	Midwestern Collegiate Conference
Sacramento State Hornets	NCAA Division I Independent	American West Conference
Southern Utah Thunderbirds	NCAA Division I Independent	American West Conference
Troy State Trojans	East Coast Conference	Mid-Continent Conference
Wright State Raiders	Mid-Continent Conference	Midwestern Collegiate Conference

== Regular season ==
=== Conferences ===
==== Conference winners and tournaments ====
Thirty conferences concluded their seasons with a single-elimination tournament, with only the Big Ten Conference, Ivy League. and Pac-10 Conference choosing not to conduct conference tournaments. Conference tournament winners, with the exception of those of the American West Conference, Big South Conference, Great Midwest Conference, and Mid-Continent Conference, received an automatic bid to the 1995 NCAA Division I men's basketball tournament.

Conference	Regular season winner	Conference player of the year	Conference tournament	Tournament venue (City)	Tournament winner
American West Conference	Southern Utah	Sean Allen, Southern Utah	1995 American West Conference men's basketball tournament	Centrum Centre (St. George, Utah)	Southern Utah
Atlantic 10 Conference	UMass	Lou Roe, UMass	1995 Atlantic 10 men's basketball tournament	Mullins Center (Amherst, Massachusetts)	UMass
Atlantic Coast Conference	Maryland; North Carolina; Virginia; Wake Forest	Joe Smith, Maryland	1995 ACC men's basketball tournament	Greensboro Coliseum (Greensboro, North Carolina)	Wake Forest
Big East Conference	Connecticut	Kerry Kittles, Villanova	1995 Big East men's basketball tournament	Madison Square Garden (New York City, New York)	Villanova
Big Eight Conference	Kansas	Ryan Minor, Oklahoma; Bryant Reeves, Oklahoma State	1995 Big Eight Conference men's basketball tournament	Kemper Arena (Kansas City, Missouri)	Oklahoma State
Big Sky Conference	Montana; Weber State	Ruben Nembhard, Weber State	1995 Big Sky Conference men's basketball tournament	Dee Events Center (Ogden, Utah)	Weber State
Big South Conference	UNC Greensboro	Eric Burks, Charleston Southern	1995 Big South Conference men's basketball tournament	Vines Center (Lynchburg, Virginia)	Charleston Southern
Big Ten Conference	Purdue	Shawn Respert, Michigan State	No Tournament		
Big West Conference	Utah State	Eric Franson, Utah State	1995 Big West Conference men's basketball tournament	Thomas & Mack Center (Paradise, Nevada)	Long Beach State
Colonial Athletic Association	Old Dominion	Petey Sessoms, Old Dominion	1995 CAA men's basketball tournament	Richmond Coliseum (Richmond, Virginia)	Old Dominion
Great Midwest Conference	Memphis	Tom Kleinschmidt, DePaul	1995 Great Midwest Conference men's basketball tournament	Bradley Center (Milwaukee, Wisconsin)	Cincinnati
Ivy League	Penn	Matt Maloney, Penn	No Tournament		
Metro Conference	Charlotte	Jarvis Lang, Charlotte	1995 Metro Conference men's basketball tournament	Freedom Hall (Louisville, Kentucky)	Louisville
Metro Atlantic Athletic Conference	Manhattan	Craig Wise, Canisius	1995 MAAC men's basketball tournament	Knickerbocker Arena (Albany, New York)	Saint Peter's
Mid-American Conference	Miami (OH)	Gary Trent, Ohio	1995 MAC men's basketball tournament	Savage Hall (Toledo, Ohio)	Ball State
Mid-Continent Conference	Valparaiso	David Redmon, Little Rock	1995 Mid-Continent Conference men's basketball tournament	Athletics–Recreation Center (Valparaiso, Indiana)	Valparaiso
Mid-Eastern Athletic Conference	Coppin State	Stephen Stewart, Coppin State	1995 MEAC men's basketball tournament	Talmadge L. Hill Field House (Baltimore, Maryland)	North Carolina A&T
Midwestern Collegiate Conference	Xavier	Sherell Ford, UIC	1995 MCC men's basketball tournament	Nutter Center (Dayton, Ohio)	Green Bay
Missouri Valley Conference	Tulsa	Chris Carr, Southern Illinois	1995 Missouri Valley Conference men's basketball tournament	Kiel Center (St. Louis, Missouri)	Southern Illinois
North Atlantic Conference	Drexel	Malik Rose, Drexel	1995 North Atlantic Conference men's basketball tournament	Daskalakis Athletic Center (Philadelphia, Pennsylvania)	Drexel
Northeast Conference	Rider	Joe Griffin, Long Island	1995 Northeast Conference men's basketball tournament	Alumni Gymnasium (Lawrenceville, New Jersey)	Mount St. Mary's
Ohio Valley Conference	Murray State; Tennessee State	Marcus Brown, Murray State	1995 Ohio Valley Conference men's basketball tournament	Nashville Municipal Auditorium (Nashville, Tennessee)	Murray State
Pacific-10 Conference	UCLA	Ed O'Bannon, UCLA; Damon Stoudamire, Arizona	No Tournament		
Patriot League	Bucknell; Colgate	Rob Feaster, Holy Cross	1995 Patriot League men's basketball tournament	Cotterell Court (Hamilton, New York)	Colgate
Southeastern Conference	Kentucky (East); Arkansas (West); Mississippi State (West)	Corliss Williamson, Arkansas	1995 SEC men's basketball tournament	Georgia Dome (Atlanta, Georgia)	Kentucky
Southern Conference	Marshall (North); Chattanooga (South)	Frankie King, Western Carolina	1995 Southern Conference men's basketball tournament	Asheville Civic Center (Asheville, North Carolina)	Chattanooga
Southland Conference	Nicholls State	Reggie Jackson, Nicholls State	1995 Southland Conference men's basketball tournament	Hirsch Memorial Coliseum (Shreveport, Louisiana)	Nicholls State
Southwest Conference	Texas; Texas Tech	Kurt Thomas, TCU	1995 Southwest Conference men's basketball tournament	Reunion Arena (Dallas, Texas)	Texas
Southwestern Athletic Conference	Texas Southern	Kenny Sykes, Grambling State	1995 SWAC men's basketball tournament	—	Texas Southern
Sun Belt Conference	Western Kentucky	Chris Robinson, Western Kentucky	1995 Sun Belt men's basketball tournament	Barton Coliseum (Little Rock, Arkansas)	Western Kentucky
Trans America Athletic Conference	College of Charleston	Kerry Blackshear, Stetson	1995 TAAC men's basketball tournament	UCF Arena (Orlando, Florida)	FIU
West Coast Conference	Santa Clara	Steve Nash, Santa Clara	1995 West Coast Conference men's basketball tournament	Toso Pavilion (Santa Clara, California)	Gonzaga
Western Athletic Conference	Utah	Keith Van Horn, Utah	1995 WAC men's basketball tournament	The Pit (Albuquerque, New Mexico)	Utah

==== Conference standings ====
1994–95 American West Conference men's basketball standings
	Conf.				Overall
Team	W		L	PCT	W		L	PCT
Southern Utah†	6	–	0	1.000	17	–	11	.607
Cal State Northridge	4	–	2	.667	8	–	20	.286
Sacramento State	2	–	4	.333	6	–	21	.222
Cal Poly	0	–	6	.000	1	–	26	.037
† 1995 American West tournament winner Rankings from AP poll

1994–95 ACC men's basketball standings
	Conf.				Overall
Team	W		L	PCT	W		L	PCT
No. 3 Wake Forest †	12	–	4	.750	26	–	6	.813
No. 4 North Carolina	12	–	4	.750	28	–	6	.824
No. 10 Maryland	12	–	4	.750	26	–	8	.765
No. 13 Virginia	12	–	4	.750	25	–	9	.735
Georgia Tech	8	–	8	.500	18	–	12	.600
Florida State	5	–	11	.313	12	–	15	.444
Clemson	5	–	11	.313	15	–	13	.536
NC State	4	–	12	.250	12	–	15	.444
Duke	2	–	14	.125	13	–	18	.419
† 1995 ACC tournament winner Rankings from AP poll

1994–95 Atlantic 10 men's basketball standings
	Conf.				Overall
Team	W		L	PCT	W		L	PCT
No. 7 UMass †	13	–	3	.813	29	–	5	.853
Temple	10	–	6	.625	19	–	11	.633
George Washington	10	–	6	.625	18	–	14	.563
Saint Joseph's	9	–	7	.563	17	–	12	.586
St. Bonaventure	9	–	7	.563	18	–	13	.581
West Virginia	7	–	9	.438	13	–	13	.500
Rutgers	7	–	9	.438	13	–	15	.464
Duquesne	5	–	11	.313	10	–	18	.357
Rhode Island	2	–	14	.125	7	–	20	.259
† 1995 Atlantic 10 Tournament winner Rankings from AP Poll

1994–95 Big East men's basketball standings
	Conf.				Overall
Team	W		L	PCT	W		L	PCT
No. 8 Connecticut	16	–	2	.889	28	–	5	.848
No. 9 Villanova †	14	–	4	.778	25	–	8	.758
No. 25 Syracuse	12	–	6	.667	20	–	10	.667
No. 22 Georgetown	11	–	7	.611	21	–	10	.677
Miami	9	–	9	.500	15	–	13	.536
Providence	7	–	11	.389	17	–	13	.567
Seton Hall	7	–	11	.389	16	–	14	.533
St. John's	7	–	11	.389	14	–	14	.500
Pittsburgh	5	–	13	.278	10	–	18	.357
Boston College	2	–	16	.111	9	–	19	.321
† 1995 Big East tournament winner As of April 3, 1995; Rankings from AP Poll

1994–95 Big Eight Conference men's basketball standings
	Conf.				Overall
Team	W		L	PCT	W		L	PCT
No. 5 Kansas	11	–	3	.786	25	–	6	.806
No. 14 Oklahoma State †	10	–	4	.714	27	–	10	.730
No. 17 Oklahoma	9	–	5	.643	23	–	9	.719
No. 23 Missouri	8	–	6	.571	20	–	9	.690
Iowa State	6	–	8	.429	23	–	11	.676
Colorado	5	–	9	.357	15	–	13	.536
Nebraska	4	–	10	.286	18	–	14	.563
Kansas State	3	–	11	.214	12	–	15	.444
† 1995 Big Eight tournament winner As of April 4, 1995; Rankings from AP poll

1994–95 Big Sky men's basketball standings
	Conf.				Overall
Team	W		L	PCT	W		L	PCT
Weber State †	11	–	3	.786	21	–	9	.700
Montana	11	–	3	.786	21	–	9	.700
Montana State	8	–	6	.571	21	–	8	.724
Boise State	7	–	7	.500	17	–	10	.630
Idaho State	7	–	7	.500	18	–	10	.643
Idaho	6	–	8	.429	12	–	15	.444
Northern Arizona	4	–	10	.286	8	–	18	.308
Eastern Washington	2	–	12	.143	6	–	20	.231
† Conference tournament winner

1994–95 Big South Conference men's basketball standings
	Conf.				Overall
Team	W		L	PCT	W		L	PCT
UNC Greensboro	14	–	2	.875	20	–	6	.769
Charleston Southern †	12	–	4	.750	19	–	10	.655
UMBC	10	–	6	.625	13	–	14	.481
Radford	9	–	7	.563	16	–	12	.571
Liberty	7	–	9	.438	12	–	16	.429
UNC Asheville	7	–	9	.438	11	–	16	.407
Towson State	6	–	10	.375	12	–	15	.444
Winthrop	4	–	12	.250	7	–	20	.259
Coastal Carolina	3	–	13	.188	6	–	20	.231
† 1995 Big South tournament winner Rankings from AP Poll

1994–95 Big Ten Conference men's basketball standings
	Conf.				Overall
Team	W		L	PCT	W		L	PCT
No. 12 Purdue	15	–	3	.833	25	–	7	.781
No. 11 Michigan State	14	–	4	.778	22	–	6	.786
Indiana	11	–	7	.611	19	–	12	.613
Michigan	11	–	7	.611	17	–	14	.548
Illinois	10	–	8	.556	19	–	12	.613
Minnesota	10	–	8	.556	20	–	11	.645
Penn State	9	–	9	.500	21	–	11	.656
Iowa	9	–	9	.500	21	–	12	.636
Wisconsin	7	–	11	.389	13	–	14	.481
Ohio State	2	–	16	.111	6	–	22	.214
Northwestern	1	–	17	.056	5	–	22	.185
Rankings from AP Poll; *Minnesota 1 NCAA Tourn. game vacated due to sanctions against the program; 1 Win by forfeit (non-conf.); Disputed record (19-12)

1994–95 Big West men's basketball standings
	Conf.				Overall
Team	W		L	PCT	W		L	PCT
Utah State	14	–	4	.778	21	–	8	.724
New Mexico State	13	–	5	.722	25	–	10	.714
Long Beach State †	13	–	5	.722	20	–	10	.667
Nevada	12	–	6	.667	18	–	11	.621
Pacific	9	–	9	.500	14	–	13	.519
UC Santa Barbara	8	–	10	.444	13	–	14	.481
UNLV	7	–	11	.389	12	–	16	.429
UC Irvine	6	–	12	.333	13	–	16	.448
Cal State Fullerton	5	–	13	.278	7	–	20	.259
San Jose State	3	–	15	.167	4	–	23	.148
† 1995 Big West tournament winner Rankings from AP poll

1994–95 CAA men's basketball standings
	Conf.				Overall
Team	W		L	PCT	W		L	PCT
Old Dominion †	12	–	2	.857	21	–	12	.636
UNC Wilmington	10	–	4	.714	16	–	11	.593
James Madison	9	–	5	.643	16	–	13	.552
East Carolina	7	–	7	.500	18	–	11	.621
American	7	–	7	.500	9	–	19	.321
William & Mary	6	–	8	.429	8	–	19	.296
Richmond	3	–	11	.214	8	–	20	.286
George Mason	2	–	12	.143	7	–	20	.259
† 1995 CAA tournament winner Rankings from AP poll

1994–95 Great Midwest Conference men's basketball standings
	Conf.				Overall
Team	W		L	PCT	W		L	PCT
Memphis	9	–	3	.750	24	–	10	.706
Saint Louis	8	–	4	.667	23	–	8	.742
Marquette	7	–	5	.583	21	–	12	.636
Cincinnati †	7	–	5	.583	22	–	12	.647
DePaul	6	–	6	.500	17	–	11	.607
UAB	5	–	7	.417	14	–	16	.467
Dayton	0	–	12	.000	7	–	20	.259
† 1995 GMC tournament winner Rankings from AP poll

1994–95 Ivy League men's basketball standings
	Conf.				Overall
Team	W		L	PCT	W		L	PCT
Penn	14	–	0	1.000	22	–	6	.786
Princeton	10	–	4	.714	16	–	10	.615
Dartmouth	10	–	4	.714	13	–	13	.500
Brown	8	–	6	.571	13	–	13	.500
Yale	5	–	9	.357	9	–	17	.346
Cornell	4	–	10	.286	9	–	17	.346
Harvard	4	–	10	.286	6	–	20	.231
Columbia	1	–	13	.071	4	–	22	.154
Rankings from AP Poll

1994–95 Metro Conference men's basketball standings
	Conf.				Overall
Team	W		L	PCT	W		L	PCT
UNC Charlotte	8	–	4	.667	19	–	9	.679
Tulane	7	–	5	.583	23	–	10	.697
Louisville †	7	–	5	.583	19	–	14	.576
Virginia Tech	6	–	6	.500	25	–	10	.714
Southern Miss	6	–	6	.500	17	–	13	.567
South Florida	5	–	7	.417	18	–	12	.600
VCU	3	–	9	.250	16	–	14	.533
† 1995 Metro Conference tournament winner Rankings from AP Poll

1994–95 MAAC men's basketball standings
	Conf.				Overall
Team	W		L	PCT	W		L	PCT
Manhattan	12	–	2	.857	26	–	5	.839
Canisius	10	–	4	.714	21	–	14	.600
Saint Peter's †	10	–	4	.714	19	–	11	.633
Fairfield	6	–	8	.429	13	–	15	.464
Iona	6	–	8	.429	10	–	17	.370
Siena	5	–	9	.357	8	–	19	.296
Loyola (MD)	5	–	9	.357	9	–	18	.333
Niagara	2	–	12	.143	5	–	25	.167
† 1995 MAAC tournament winner Rankings from AP Poll

1994–95 Mid-American Conference men's basketball standings
	Conf.				Overall
Team	W		L	PCT	W		L	PCT
Miami	16	–	2	.889	23	–	7	.767
Ohio	13	–	5	.722	24	–	10	.706
Eastern Michigan	12	–	6	.667	20	–	10	.667
Ball State †	11	–	7	.611	19	–	11	.633
Bowling Green	10	–	8	.556	16	–	11	.593
Toledo	10	–	8	.556	16	–	11	.593
Western Michigan	9	–	9	.500	14	–	13	.519
Kent State	5	–	13	.278	8	–	19	.296
Akron	4	–	14	.222	8	–	18	.308
Central Michigan	0	–	18	.000	3	–	23	.115
† 1995 MAC tournament winner Rankings from AP Poll

1994–95 Mid-Continent Conference men's basketball standings
	Conf.				Overall
Team	W		L	PCT	W		L	PCT
Valparaiso †	14	–	4	.778	20	–	8	.714
Western Illinois	13	–	5	.722	20	–	8	.714
Buffalo	12	–	6	.667	18	–	10	.643
Youngstown State	10	–	8	.556	18	–	10	.643
Troy State	10	–	8	.556	11	–	16	.407
Eastern Illinois	10	–	8	.556	16	–	13	.552
Missouri–Kansas City	7	–	11	.389	7	–	19	.269
Central Connecticut State	6	–	12	.333	8	–	18	.308
Chicago State	6	–	12	.333	6	–	20	.231
Northeastern Illinois	2	–	16	.111	4	–	22	.154
† 1995 Mid-Con Tournament winner Rankings from AP Poll

1994–95 MEAC men's basketball standings
	Conf.				Overall
Team	W		L	PCT	W		L	PCT
Coppin State	15	–	1	.938	21	–	10	.677
South Carolina State	11	–	5	.688	15	–	13	.536
North Carolina A&T †	10	–	6	.625	15	–	15	.500
Maryland Eastern Shore	9	–	7	.563	13	–	14	.481
Bethune–Cookman	9	–	7	.563	12	–	16	.429
Howard	8	–	8	.500	9	–	18	.333
Morgan State	5	–	11	.313	5	–	22	.185
Delaware State	3	–	13	.188	7	–	21	.250
Florida A&M	2	–	14	.125	5	–	22	.185
† 1995 MEAC tournament winner Rankings from AP Poll

1994–95 Midwestern Collegiate Conference men's basketball standings
	Conf.				Overall
Team	W		L	PCT	W		L	PCT
Xavier	14	–	0	1.000	23	–	5	.821
Illinois-Chicago	11	–	4	.733	18	–	9	.667
WI-Green Bay †	11	–	4	.733	22	–	8	.733
Detroit Mercy	9	–	5	.643	13	–	15	.464
Butler	8	–	7	.533	15	–	12	.556
La Salle	7	–	7	.500	13	–	14	.481
Northern Illinois	7	–	8	.467	19	–	10	.655
Wright State	6	–	8	.429	13	–	17	.433
Cleveland State	3	–	11	.214	10	–	17	.370
UW-Milwaukee	2	–	13	.133	3	–	24	.111
Loyola (IL)	2	–	13	.133	5	–	22	.185
† 1995 MCC tournament winner Rankings from AP Poll

1994–95 Missouri Valley Conference men's basketball standings
	Conf.				Overall
Team	W		L	PCT	W		L	PCT
Tulsa	15	–	3	.833	24	–	8	.750
Illinois State	13	–	5	.722	20	–	13	.606
Southern Illinois †	13	–	5	.722	23	–	9	.719
Bradley	12	–	6	.667	20	–	10	.667
Evansville	11	–	7	.611	18	–	9	.667
Drake	9	–	9	.500	12	–	15	.444
Southwest Missouri State	9	–	9	.500	16	–	11	.593
Wichita State	6	–	12	.333	13	–	14	.481
Northern Iowa	4	–	14	.222	8	–	20	.286
Creighton	4	–	14	.222	7	–	19	.269
Indiana State	3	–	15	.167	7	–	19	.269
† 1995 MVC tournament winner Rankings from AP Poll

1994–95 North Atlantic Conference men's basketball standings
	Conf.				Overall
Team	W		L	PCT	W		L	PCT
Drexel †	12	–	4	.750	22	–	8	.733
New Hampshire	11	–	5	.688	19	–	9	.679
Northeastern	10	–	6	.625	18	–	11	.621
Hartford	7	–	9	.438	11	–	16	.407
Boston University	7	–	9	.438	15	–	16	.484
Vermont	7	–	9	.438	14	–	13	.519
Delaware	7	–	9	.438	12	–	15	.444
Maine	6	–	10	.375	11	–	16	.407
Hofstra	5	–	11	.313	10	–	18	.357
† 1995 NAC tournament winner Rankings from AP poll

1994–95 Northeast Conference men's basketball standings
	Conf.				Overall
Team	W		L	PCT	W		L	PCT
Rider	13	–	5	.722	18	–	11	.621
Mount St. Mary's †	12	–	6	.667	17	–	13	.567
Marist	12	–	6	.667	17	–	11	.607
Monmouth	11	–	7	.611	13	–	14	.481
Fairleigh Dickinson	11	–	7	.611	16	–	12	.571
Wagner	9	–	9	.500	10	–	17	.370
Long Island	8	–	10	.444	11	–	17	.393
Saint Francis (PA)	7	–	11	.389	12	–	16	.429
St. Francis Brooklyn	5	–	13	.278	9	–	18	.333
Robert Morris	2	–	16	.111	4	–	23	.148
† 1995 NEC tournament winner

1994–95 Ohio Valley Conference men's basketball standings
	Conf.				Overall
Team	W		L	PCT	W		L	PCT
Tennessee State	11	–	5	.688	17	–	10	.630
Murray State †	11	–	5	.688	21	–	9	.700
Morehead State	10	–	6	.625	15	–	12	.556
Tennessee Tech	9	–	7	.563	13	–	14	.481
Austin Peay	8	–	8	.500	13	–	16	.448
Southeast Missouri State	7	–	9	.438	13	–	14	.481
Eastern Kentucky	6	–	10	.375	9	–	19	.321
Middle Tennessee	5	–	11	.313	12	–	15	.444
UT Martin	5	–	11	.313	7	–	20	.259
† 1995 OVC tournament winner Rankings from AP Poll

1994–95 Pacific-10 Conference men's basketball standings
	Conf.				Overall
Team	W		L	PCT	W		L	PCT
No. 1 UCLA	17	–	1	.944	32	–	1	.970
No. 15 Arizona	14	–	4	.778	24	–	7	.774
No. 16 Arizona State	12	–	6	.667	24	–	9	.727
Oregon	11	–	7	.611	19	–	9	.679
Stanford	10	–	8	.556	20	–	9	.690
Washington State	10	–	8	.556	18	–	12	.600
Washington	6	–	12	.333	10	–	17	.370
Oregon State	6	–	12	.333	9	–	18	.333
USC	4	–	14	.222	9	–	19	.321
California^{1}	0	–	18	.000	0	–	27	.000
As of November 23, 2011; Rankings from AP Poll^{1}California forfeited all wins due to infractions.

1994–95 Patriot League men's basketball standings
	Conf.				Overall
Team	W		L	PCT	W		L	PCT
Colgate †	11	–	3	.786	17	–	13	.567
Bucknell	11	–	3	.786	13	–	14	.481
Navy	10	–	4	.714	20	–	9	.690
Holy Cross	9	–	5	.643	15	–	12	.556
Fordham	6	–	8	.429	11	–	17	.393
Lehigh	5	–	9	.357	11	–	16	.407
Army	4	–	10	.286	12	–	16	.429
Lafayette	0	–	14	.000	2	–	25	.074
† 1995 Patriot League tournament winner

1994–95 Southeastern Conference men's basketball standings
	Conf.				Overall
Team	W		L	PCT	W		L	PCT
East Division
No. 2 Kentucky †	14	–	2	.875	28	–	5	.848
Georgia	9	–	7	.563	18	–	10	.643
Florida	8	–	8	.500	17	–	13	.567
Vanderbilt	6	–	10	.375	13	–	15	.464
South Carolina	5	–	11	.313	10	–	17	.370
Tennessee	4	–	12	.250	11	–	16	.407
West Division
No. 6 Arkansas	12	–	4	.750	32	–	7	.821
No. 18 Mississippi State	12	–	4	.750	22	–	8	.733
No. 20 Alabama	10	–	6	.625	23	–	10	.697
Auburn	7	–	9	.438	16	–	13	.552
LSU	6	–	10	.375	12	–	15	.444
Ole Miss	3	–	13	.188	8	–	19	.296
† 1995 SEC tournament winner Rankings from AP Poll

1994–95 Southern Conference men's basketball standings
	Conf.				Overall
Team	W		L	PCT	W		L	PCT
North
Marshall	10	–	4	.714	18	–	9	.667
East Tennessee State	9	–	5	.643	14	–	14	.500
Davidson	7	–	7	.500	14	–	13	.519
VMI	6	–	8	.429	10	–	17	.370
Appalachian State	4	–	10	.286	9	–	20	.310
South
Chattanooga †	11	–	3	.786	19	–	11	.633
Western Carolina	8	–	6	.571	14	–	14	.500
The Citadel	6	–	8	.429	11	–	16	.407
Furman	6	–	8	.429	10	–	17	.370
Georgia Southern	3	–	11	.214	8	–	20	.286
† SoCon Tournament winner As of April 30, 1995; Rankings from AP poll

1994–95 Southland Conference men's basketball standings
	Conf.				Overall
Team	W		L	PCT	W		L	PCT
Nicholls State †	17	–	1	.944	24	–	6	.800
UTSA	11	–	7	.611	15	–	13	.536
Northeast Louisiana	11	–	7	.611	14	–	18	.438
North Texas	9	–	9	.500	14	–	13	.519
Stephen F. Austin	9	–	9	.500	14	–	14	.500
Northwestern State	8	–	10	.444	13	–	14	.481
Southwest Texas State	7	–	11	.389	12	–	14	.462
McNeese State	7	–	11	.389	11	–	16	.407
Texas-Arlington	7	–	11	.389	10	–	17	.370
Sam Houston State	4	–	14	.222	7	–	19	.269
† 1995 Southland tournament winner Rankings from AP Poll

1994–95 Southwest Conference men's basketball standings
	Conf.				Overall
Team	W		L	PCT	W		L	PCT
Texas ^{#}†	11	–	3	.786	23	–	7	.767
Texas Tech ^{#}	11	–	3	.786	20	–	10	.667
TCU	8	–	6	.571	16	–	11	.593
Rice	8	–	6	.571	15	–	13	.536
Texas A&M	7	–	7	.500	14	–	16	.467
Houston	5	–	9	.357	9	–	19	.321
SMU	3	–	11	.214	7	–	20	.259
Baylor	3	–	11	.214	9	–	19	.321
† 1995 SWC tournament winner^{#} conference co-champion Rankings from AP Poll

1994–95 SWAC men's basketball standings
	Conf.				Overall
Team	W		L	PCT	W		L	PCT
Texas Southern †	12	–	2	.857	22	–	7	.759
Mississippi Valley State	10	–	4	.714	17	–	11	.607
Alabama State	8	–	6	.571	11	–	15	.423
Southern	7	–	7	.500	13	–	13	.500
Jackson State	7	–	7	.500	12	–	19	.387
Grambling State	5	–	9	.357	11	–	17	.393
Alcorn State	4	–	10	.286	7	–	19	.269
Prairie View A&M	3	–	11	.214	6	–	21	.222
† 1995 SWAC tournament winner Rankings from AP Poll

1994–95 Sun Belt Conference men's basketball standings
	Conf.				Overall
Team	W		L	PCT	W		L	PCT
No. 21 Western Kentucky †	17	–	1	.944	27	–	4	.871
New Orleans	13	–	5	.722	20	–	11	.645
Jacksonville	12	–	6	.667	18	–	9	.667
Texas–Pan American	10	–	8	.556	14	–	14	.500
Louisiana Tech	9	–	9	.500	14	–	13	.519
Arkansas-Little Rock	9	–	9	.500	17	–	12	.586
South Alabama	7	–	11	.389	9	–	18	.333
Lamar	6	–	12	.333	11	–	16	.407
Southwestern Louisiana	4	–	14	.222	7	–	22	.241
Arkansas State	3	–	15	.167	8	–	20	.286
† 1995 Sun Belt Conference tournament winner Rankings from AP Poll

1994–95 TAAC men's basketball standings
	Conf.				Overall
Team	W		L	PCT	W		L	PCT
College of Charleston	15	–	1	.938	23	–	6	.793
Samford	11	–	5	.688	16	–	11	.593
Stetson	11	–	5	.688	15	–	12	.556
Mercer	8	–	8	.500	15	–	14	.517
Southeastern Louisiana	7	–	9	.438	12	–	16	.429
Central Florida	7	–	9	.438	11	–	16	.407
Centenary	7	–	9	.438	10	–	17	.370
Georgia State	6	–	10	.375	11	–	17	.393
Florida International †	4	–	12	.250	11	–	19	.367
Campbell	4	–	12	.250	8	–	18	.308
Florida Atlantic		–		–	9	–	18	.333
† 1995 TAAC tournament winner Rankings from AP poll

1994–95 West Coast Conference men's basketball standings
	Conf.				Overall
Team	W		L	PCT	W		L	PCT
Santa Clara	12	–	2	.857	21	–	7	.750
Portland	10	–	4	.714	21	–	8	.724
Saint Mary's	10	–	4	.714	18	–	10	.643
Gonzaga †	7	–	7	.500	21	–	9	.700
San Diego	5	–	9	.357	11	–	16	.407
San Francisco	4	–	10	.286	10	–	19	.345
Pepperdine	4	–	10	.286	8	–	19	.296
Loyola Marymount	4	–	10	.286	13	–	15	.464
† Conference tournament winner Rankings from AP poll

1994–95 WAC men's basketball standings
	Conf.				Overall
Team	W		L	PCT	W		L	PCT
No. 19 Utah †	15	–	3	.833	28	–	6	.824
BYU	13	–	5	.722	22	–	10	.688
UTEP	13	–	5	.722	20	–	10	.667
Wyoming	9	–	9	.500	13	–	15	.464
New Mexico	9	–	9	.500	15	–	15	.500
Hawaii	8	–	10	.444	16	–	13	.552
Colorado State	7	–	11	.389	17	–	14	.548
Fresno State	7	–	11	.389	13	–	15	.464
San Diego State	5	–	13	.278	11	–	17	.393
Air Force	4	–	14	.222	8	–	20	.286
† 1995 WAC tournament winner Rankings from AP Poll

=== Division I independents ===
Two schools played as Division I independents. They had no postseason play.

1994–95 NCAA Division I men's basketball independents standings
	Conf.				Overall
Team	W		L	PCT	W		L	PCT
Notre Dame	-	–	-	–	15	–	12	.556
Oral Roberts	-	–	-	–	10	–	17	.370
Rankings from AP Poll

=== Informal championships ===
Conference	Regular season winner	Most Valuable Player
Philadelphia Big 5	Saint Joseph's & Temple	Kerry Kittles, Villanova

For the fourth consecutive season, the Philadelphia Big 5 did not play a full round-robin schedule in which each team met each other team once, a format it had used from its first season of competition in 1955–56 through the 1990–91 season. Instead, each team played only two games against other Big 5 members, and Saint Joseph's and Temple both finished with 2–0 records in head-to-head competition among the Big 5. The Big 5 did not revive its full round-robin schedule until the 1999–2000 season.

=== Statistical leaders ===
Source for additional stats categories

Points per game			Rebounds per game			Assists per game			Steals per game		
Player	School	PPG	Player	School	RPG	Player	School	APG	Player	School	SPG
Kurt Thomas	TCU	28.9	Kurt Thomas	TCU	14.6	Nelson Haggerty	Baylor	10.1	Roderick Anderson	Texas	3.4
Frankie King	W. Carolina	26.5	Malik Rose	Drexel	13.5	Curtis McCants	George Mason	9.3	Greg Black	TX-Pan American	3.4
Kenny Sykes	Grambling St.	26.3	Gary Trent	Ohio	12.8	Raimonds Miglinieks	UC Irvine	8.4	Nate Langley	George Mason	3.3
Sherell Ford	UIC	26.2	Dan Callahan	Northeastern	12.6	Eric Snow	Michigan St.	7.8	Ray Washington	Nicholls St.	3.0
Tim Roberts	Southern	26.2	Tim Duncan	Wake Forest	12.5	Jacque Vaughn	Kansas	7.7	Clarence Ceasar	LSU	3.0

Blocked shots per game			Field goal percentage			Three-point FG percentage			Free throw percentage		
Player	School	BPG	Player	School	FG%	Player	School	3FG%	Player	School	FT%
Keith Closs	C. Connecticut St.	5.3	Shane Kline-Ruminsky	Bowling Green	.683	Chris Westlake	Wisc–Green Bay	.500	Gregg Bibb	Tennessee Tech	.906
Theo Ratliff	Wyoming	5.1	George Spain	Davidson	.671	Jeremy Lake	Montana	.484	Scott Hartzell	UNC Greensboro	.898
Adonal Foyle	Colgate	4.9	Rasheed Wallace	N. Carolina	.654	Dion Cross	Stanford	.479	Marcus Brown	Murray St.	.896
Pascal Fleury	UMBC	4.6	Erick Dampier	Mississippi St.	.640	Shawn Respert	Michigan St.	.474	Keith Cornett	Texas-Arlington	.886
Lorenzo Coleman	Tennessee Tech	4.5	Alexander Koul	George Washington	.632	Rob Wooster	St. Francis (PA)	.471	Arlando Johnson	E. Kentucky	.885

== Post-season tournaments ==
=== NCAA tournament ===
==== Final Four – Kingdome, Seattle, Washington ====
National semifinals
E4	Oklahoma State	61
W1	UCLA	74
SE2	North Carolina	68
M2	Arkansas	75

National championship game
W1	UCLA	89
M2	Arkansas	78

=== National Invitation tournament ===
==== Semifinals & finals ====
Semifinals
Virginia Tech	71
Canisius	59
Marquette	81
Penn State	79

Finals
Virginia Tech	65
Marquette	64
Third place
Canisius	62
Penn State	66

== Award winners ==
=== Consensus All-American teams ===
Consensus First Team
Player	Position	Class	Team
Ed O'Bannon	F	Senior	UCLA
Shawn Respert	G	Senior	Michigan State
Joe Smith	F/C	Sophomore	Maryland
Jerry Stackhouse	F/G	Sophomore	North Carolina
Damon Stoudamire	G	Senior	Arizona

Consensus Second Team
Player	Position	Class	Team
Randolph Childress	G	Senior	Wake Forest
Kerry Kittles	G	Junior	Villanova
Lou Roe	F	Senior	Massachusetts
Rasheed Wallace	C	Sophomore	North Carolina
Corliss Williamson	F	Junior	Arkansas

=== Major player of the year awards ===
- Wooden Award: Ed O'Bannon, UCLA
- Naismith Award: Joe Smith, Maryland
- Associated Press Player of the Year: Joe Smith, Maryland
- NABC Player of the Year: Shawn Respert, Michigan State
- Oscar Robertson Trophy (USBWA): Ed O'Bannon, UCLA
- Adolph Rupp Trophy: Joe Smith, Maryland
- Sporting News Player of the Year: Shawn Respert, Michigan State
- UPI College Basketball Player of the Year: Joe Smith, Maryland

=== Major freshman of the year awards ===
- USBWA Freshman of the Year: No Award Given

=== Major coach of the year awards ===
- Associated Press Coach of the Year: Kelvin Sampson, Oklahoma
- Henry Iba Award (USBWA): Kelvin Sampson, Oklahoma
- NABC Coach of the Year: Jim Harrick, UCLA
- Naismith College Coach of the Year: Jim Harrick, UCLA
- Sporting News Coach of the Year: Jud Heathcote, Michigan State

=== Other major awards ===
- NABC Defensive Player of the Year: Tim Duncan, Wake Forest
- Frances Pomeroy Naismith Award (Best player under 6'0): Tyus Edney, UCLA
- Robert V. Geasey Trophy (Top player in Philadelphia Big 5): Kerry Kittles, Villanova
- NIT/Haggerty Award (Top player in New York City metro area): Joe Griffin, Long Island

== Coaching changes ==
A number of teams changed coaches during the season and after it ended.

Team	Former Coach	Interim Coach	New Coach	Reason
Akron	Coleman Crawford		Dan Hipsher	Crawford left to join the Tulsa coaching staff.
Alabama State	James Oliver		John L. Williams	
Boise State	Bobby Dye		Rod Jensen	Jensen was promoted from assistant to head coach.
Cal Poly	Steve Beason		Jeff Schneider	Beason was fired after going 1–26 in their first season in Division I. Schneider was hired from the Washington State coaching staff.
Columbia	Jack Rohan		Armond Hill	Hill was hired from the Princeton coaching staff.
Delaware	Steve Steinwedel		Mike Brey	Steinwedel was forced to resign. Brey was hired from the Duke coaching staff.
Duquesne	John Carroll		Scott Edgar	
East Carolina	Eddie Payne		Joe Dooley	Payne left to coach Oregon State. Dooley was promoted to head coach.
Eastern Washington	John Wade		Steve Aggers	Aggers was hired from the Kansas State coaching staff.
FIU	Bob Weltlich		Shakey Rodriguez	Weltlich resigned midseason, but finished the season making the 1995 NCAA Tournament with only 11 wins on the year. Rodriguez was hired from the high school ranks after going 428–62 in 14 years winning five Florida state titles.
Florida Atlantic	Tim Loomis		Kevin Billerman	Loomis was let go going 12–42 his last two seasons.
Fresno State	Gary Colson		Jerry Tarkanian	Tarkanian returned to college basketball to coach his alma mater after being fired from the San Antonio Spurs from having disagreements with the owner of the Spurs.
Georgia	Hugh Durham		Tubby Smith	
Georgia Southern	Frank Kerns	Doug Durham	Gregg Polinsky	Kerns resigned due to allegations to a recruiting violation.
Grambling State	Aaron James		Lacey Reynolds	Reynolds was hired from the Texas Southern coaching staff.
Iona	Jerry Welsh		Tim Welsh	Jerry resigned midway through the season due to health concerns. Tim, his son and assistant took over the remainder of the season. Tim was named permanent head coach after the season.
Lafayette	John Leone		Fran O'Hanlon	O'Hanlon was hired from the Penn coaching staff.
Michigan State	Jud Heathcote		Tom Izzo	
Morgan State	Lynn Rampage		Chris Fuller	
Murray State	Scott Edgar		Mark Gottfried	Edgar left to coach Duquesne. Gottfried was hired from the UCLA coaching staff.
Oregon State	Jimmy Anderson		Eddie Payne	Anderson was let go after the end of the season after having losing seasons the last four years.
Penn State	Bruce Parkhill		Jerry Dunn	Dunn was promoted from assistant coach.
Saint Joseph's	John Griffin		Phil Martelli	Martelli was promoted from assistant.
Saint Peter's	Ted Fiore		Roger Blind	
San Francisco	Jim Brovelli		Phil Mathews	
SMU	John Shumate		Mike Dement	Shumate left to join the Toronto Raptors coaching staff.
South Alabama	Ronnie Arrow	Judas Prada	Bill Musselman	Arrow was fired after four games into the season going 1–3.
Southwest Missouri State	Mark Bernsen		Steve Alford	Alford leaves Division III Manchester after being runner-up in the tournament.
Tulsa	Tubby Smith		Steve Robinson	Smith left to coach Georgia. Robinson was hired from the Kansas coaching staff.
UMBC	Earl Hawkins		Tom Sullivan	
UNC Greensboro	Mike Dement		Randy Peele	Dement left to coach SMU. Peele was promoted from assistant coach.
UNLV	Tim Grgurich	Howie Landa & Cleveland Edwards	Bill Bayno	Grgurich left the team, due to health concerns, seven games into the season after going 2–5, he would accept an assistant coach position with the Seattle Supersonics. Landa was named interim head coach going 5–2 in the next seven games. Edwards was named interim for the remainder of the season and finished 5–9. The three coaches combined 12–16. None of the coaches were retained the following year. Bayno was hired from the UMass coaching staff.
UTSA	Stu Starner		Tim Carter	
UW–Milwaukee	Steve Antrim		Ric Cobb	
WI–Green Bay	Dick Bennett		Mike Heideman	Bennett left to coach Wisconsin. Heideman was promoted from assistant.
Wisconsin	Stan Van Gundy		Dick Bennett	Van Gundy was fired after one season after going 13–14, he became an assistant on the Miami Heat coaching staff.
Western Carolina	Benny Dees		Phil Hopkins	
