= 1994–95 Wisconsin Badgers men's basketball team =

American college basketball season

1994–95 Wisconsin Badgers men's basketball
- Conference: Big Ten Conference
- Record: 13–14 (7–11 Big Ten)
- Head coach: Stan Van Gundy
- Home arena: UW Fieldhouse

1994–95 Big Ten Conference men's basketball standings
	Conf.				Overall
Team	W		L	PCT	W		L	PCT
No. 12 Purdue	15	–	3	.833	25	–	7	.781
No. 11 Michigan State	14	–	4	.778	22	–	6	.786
Indiana	11	–	7	.611	19	–	12	.613
Michigan	11	–	7	.611	17	–	14	.548
Illinois	10	–	8	.556	19	–	12	.613
Minnesota	10	–	8	.556	20	–	11	.645
Penn State	9	–	9	.500	21	–	11	.656
Iowa	9	–	9	.500	21	–	12	.636
Wisconsin	7	–	11	.389	13	–	14	.481
Ohio State	2	–	16	.111	6	–	22	.214
Northwestern	1	–	17	.056	5	–	22	.185
Rankings from AP Poll; *Minnesota 1 NCAA Tourn. game vacated due to sanctions against the program; 1 Win by forfeit (non-conf.); Disputed record (19-12)

The 1994–95 Wisconsin Badgers men's basketball team represented University of Wisconsin–Madison. The head coach was Stan Van Gundy, coaching his 1st and only season with the Badgers. The team played their home games at the UW Fieldhouse in Madison, Wisconsin and was a member of the Big Ten Conference.

== Roster ==
1994–95 Wisconsin Badgers men's basketball team
Players
Coaches

Pos.	#	Name	Height	Weight	Year	Hometown
F	0	Osita Nwachukwu	6 ft 8 in (2.03 m)	230 lb (104 kg)	Jr	Awo-Mbieri, Imo, Nigeria
F	4	Brian Kelley	6 ft 7 in (2.01 m)	240 lb (109 kg)	Sr	Decatur, GA
G/F	5	Jalil Roberts	6 ft 4 in (1.93 m)	185 lb (84 kg)	So	Jersey City, NJ
G	10	Darnell Hoskins	6 ft 0 in (1.83 m)	165 lb (75 kg)	So	Dayton, OH
G	11	Sean Mason	6 ft 2 in (1.88 m)	175 lb (79 kg)	Fr	Country Club Hills, IL
G	12	Chris Conger (W)	6 ft 3 in (1.91 m)	180 lb (82 kg)	RS Sr	Green Bay, WI
F/C	13	Mosezell Petersen	6 ft 4 in (1.93 m)	200 lb (91 kg)	Fr	Louisville, KY
G	15	Andy Kilbride	6 ft 3 in (1.91 m)	185 lb (84 kg)	Sr	Kankakee, IL
G	20	Shawn Carlin (W)	6 ft 3 in (1.91 m)	180 lb (82 kg)	So	Middleton, WI
F	24	Michael Finley (C)	6 ft 6 in (1.98 m)	205 lb (93 kg)	Sr	Maywood, IL
F	34	Howard Moore	6 ft 6 in (1.98 m)	200 lb (91 kg)	RS Sr	Chicago, IL
F	41	Booker Coleman	6 ft 9 in (2.06 m)	225 lb (102 kg)	So	Jamestown, NY
C	52	Sean Daugherty	6 ft 10 in (2.08 m)	230 lb (104 kg)	Fr	Vincennes, IN
C	54	Rashard Griffith	6 ft 11 in (2.11 m)	265 lb (120 kg)	So	Chicago, IL

Head coach

- Stan Van Gundy

Assistant coach(es)

Legend

- (C) Team captain
- (S) Suspended
- (I) Ineligible
- (W) Walk-on
- Injured
- Current redshirt

== Schedule ==
Date time, TV	Rank^{#}	Opponent^{#}	Result	Record	Site city, state
Regular Season
11/26/1994*	No. 15	Wright State	W 86–63	1–0	UW Fieldhouse; Madison, WI
11/30/1994*	No. 13	UW-Green Bay	W 61–57	2–0	UW Fieldhouse; Madison, WI
12/03/1994*	No. 13	Texas Tech	W 70–65	3–0	UW Fieldhouse; Madison, WI
12/6/1994*	No. 14	Valparaiso	W 69–51	4–0	UW Fieldhouse; Madison, WI
12/10/1994*	No. 14	at Eastern Michigan	L 76–92	4–1	Bowen Field House; Ypsilanti, MI
12/14/1994*	No. 20	UW-Milwaukee	W 90–64	5–1	UW Fieldhouse; Madison, WI
12/23/1994*	No. 20	Loyola Marymount	W 75–60	6–1	UW Fieldhouse; Madison, WI
12/27/1994*	No. 19	at Stanford	L 78–95	6–2	Maples Pavilion; Stanford, CA
12/31/1994*	No. 19	at Marquette	L 65–80	6–3	Bradley Center; Milwaukee, WI
1/4/1995		No. 14 Michigan State	L 64–78	6–4 (0–1)	UW Fieldhouse; Madison, WI
1/7/1995		at No. 21 Indiana	L 70–73	6–5 (0–2)	Assembly Hall; Bloomington, IN
1/11/1995		at Ohio State	W 81–59	7–5 (1–2)	St. John Arena; Columbus, OH
1/14/1995		Minnesota	W 74–67	8–5 (2–2)	UW Fieldhouse; Madison, WI
1/21/1995		at Iowa	L 84–96	8–6 (2–3)	Carver–Hawkeye Arena; Iowa, IA
1/26/1995		Penn State	L 67–78	8–7 (2–4)	UW Fieldhouse; Madison, WI
1/28/1995		Northwestern	W 97–73	9–7 (3–4)	UW Fieldhouse; Madison, WI
2/1/1995		at Michigan	L 58–62	9–8 (3–5)	Crisler Arena; Ann Arbor, MI
2/4/1995		Illinois	W 73–60	10–8 (4–5)	UW Fieldhouse; Madison, WI
2/11/1995		Michigan	W 70–65	11–8 (5–5)	UW Fieldhouse; Madison, WI
2/15/1995		at Northwestern	W 70–56	12–8 (6–5)	Welsh–Ryan Arena; Evanston, IL
2/18/1995		at Penn State	L 67–74	12–9 (6–6)	Rec Hall; University, PA
2/22/1995		Iowa	L 77–84	12–10 (6–7)	UW Fieldhouse; Madison, WI
2/26/1995		No. 21 Purdue	L 56–66	12–11 (6–8)	Mackey Arena; West Lafayette, IN
2/28/1995		at Minnesota	L 70–78	12–12 (6–9)	Williams Arena; Minneapolis, MN
3/4/1995		Ohio State	W 80–69	13–12 (7–9)	UW Fieldhouse; Madison, WI
3/8/1995		Indiana	L 70–72	13–13 (7–10)	UW Fieldhouse; Madison, WI
3/11/1995		at No. 9 Michigan State	L 72–97	13–14 (7–11)	Breslin Center; East Lansing, MI
*Non-conference game. ^{#}Rankings from AP Poll. (#) Tournament seedings in parentheses.
