= Joseph Griffin =

Joseph Griffin may refer to:

- Joseph Ruble Griffin (1923–1988), Justice of the Supreme Court of Mississippi from 1986 to 1988
- Joe Griffin (born c. 1972), American basketball player

== See also ==
- Arthur Joseph Griffin (born 1988), American professional baseball pitcher
- Daniel Joseph Griffin (1880–1926), New York lawyer and Democratic politician
- John Joseph Griffin (1802–1877), English chemist and publisher
- Martin Ignatius Joseph Griffin (1842–1911), American Catholic journalist and historian
