= 1995 Southwest Conference men's basketball tournament =

- Classification: Division I
- Season: 1994–95
- Teams: 7
- Site: Reunion Arena; Dallas, Texas
- Champions: Texas (2nd title)
- Winning coach: Tom Penders (2nd title)
- MVP: Terrence Rencher (Texas)
- Television: Raycom Sports

1994–95 Southwest Conference men's basketball standings
	Conf.				Overall
Team	W		L	PCT	W		L	PCT
Texas ^{#}†	11	–	3	.786	23	–	7	.767
Texas Tech ^{#}	11	–	3	.786	20	–	10	.667
TCU	8	–	6	.571	16	–	11	.593
Rice	8	–	6	.571	15	–	13	.536
Texas A&M	7	–	7	.500	14	–	16	.467
Houston	5	–	9	.357	9	–	19	.321
SMU	3	–	11	.214	7	–	20	.259
Baylor	3	–	11	.214	9	–	19	.321
† 1995 SWC tournament winner^{#} conference co-champion Rankings from AP Poll

The 1995 Southwest Conference men's basketball tournament was held March 9–11, 1995, at Reunion Arena in Dallas, Texas.

Number 1 seed Texas defeated 2 seed Texas Tech 107-104 (OT) to win their 2nd championship and receive the conference's automatic bid to the 1995 NCAA tournament.

== Format and seeding ==
The tournament consisted of the top 7 teams playing in a single-elimination tournament. The #1 seeded team received a first round bye.

Place	Seed	Team	Conference			Overall		
Place	Seed	Team	W	L	%	W	L	%
1	1	Texas	11	3	.786	23	7	.767
1	2	Texas Tech	11	3	.786	20	10	.667
3	3	TCU	8	6	.571	16	11	.593
3	4	Rice	8	6	.571	15	13	.536
5	5	Texas A&M	7	7	.500	14	16	.467
6	6	Houston	5	9	.357	9	19	.321
7	7	SMU	3	11	.214	7	20	.259
7	-	Baylor	3	11	.214	9	19	.321

== Tournament ==
Quarterfinals; Thursday, March 9
4	Rice	84
5	Texas A&M	75
3	TCU	77
6	Houston	80
2	Texas Tech	92
7	SMU	54

Semifinals; Friday, March 10
1	Texas	78
4	Rice	75
6	Houston	79
2	Texas Tech	94

Finals; Saturday, March 11
1	Texas	107 (OT)
2	Texas Tech	104
