= 1994–95 Minnesota Golden Gophers men's basketball team =

American college basketball season

1994–95 Minnesota Golden Gophers men's basketball

Great Alaska Shootout champions

NCAA tournament, first round (Vacated)
- Conference: Big Ten Conference
- Record: 20-11 (19-12 unadjusted) (10–8 Big Ten)
- Head coach: Clem Haskins (9th season)
- Assistant coaches: Milton Barnes; Larry Davis; Bill Brown
- Home arena: Williams Arena

1994–95 Big Ten Conference men's basketball standings
| | Conf. | | | | Overall |
| Team | W | | L | PCT | W | | L | PCT |
|---|---|---|---|---|---|---|---|---|
| No. 12 Purdue | 15 | – | 3 | .833 | 25 | – | 7 | .781 |
| No. 11 Michigan State | 14 | – | 4 | .778 | 22 | – | 6 | .786 |
| Indiana | 11 | – | 7 | .611 | 19 | – | 12 | .613 |
| Michigan | 11 | – | 7 | .611 | 17 | – | 14 | .548 |
| Illinois | 10 | – | 8 | .556 | 19 | – | 12 | .613 |
| Minnesota | 10 | – | 8 | .556 | 20 | – | 11 | .645 |
| Penn State | 9 | – | 9 | .500 | 21 | – | 11 | .656 |
| Iowa | 9 | – | 9 | .500 | 21 | – | 12 | .636 |
| Wisconsin | 7 | – | 11 | .389 | 13 | – | 14 | .481 |
| Ohio State | 2 | – | 16 | .111 | 6 | – | 22 | .214 |
| Northwestern | 1 | – | 17 | .056 | 5 | – | 22 | .185 |
Rankings from AP Poll; *Minnesota 1 NCAA Tourn. game vacated due to sanctions against the program; 1 Win by forfeit (non-conf.); Disputed record (19-12)

The 1994–95 Minnesota Golden Gophers men's basketball team represented the University of Minnesota as a member of the Big Ten Conference during the 1994–95 NCAA Division I men's basketball season. Led by 9th-year head coach Clem Haskins, the Golden Gophers advanced to the NCAA tournament and finished with a 19–12 record (10–8 Big Ten; overall record later adjusted to 20-11).

Minnesota vacated its NCAA Tournament appearance due to sanctions from the University of Minnesota basketball scandal.

== Roster ==
1994–95 Minnesota Golden Gophers men's basketball team
Players
Coaches

| Pos. | # | Name | Height | Weight | Year | Hometown |
|---|---|---|---|---|---|---|---|
| G/F | 5 | Sam Jacobson | 6 ft 6 in (1.98 m) | 200 lb (91 kg) | Fr | Park | Cottage Grove, MN |
| C | 12 | John Thomas | 6 ft 9 in (2.06 m) | 265 lb (120 kg) | So | Roosevelt | Minneapolis, MN |
| G/F | 21 | Voshon Lenard | 6 ft 4 in (1.93 m) | 200 lb (91 kg) | Sr | Southwestern | Detroit, MI |
| C | 50 | Trevor Winter | 7 ft 0 in (2.13 m) | 265 lb (120 kg) | So | Slayton | Slayton, MN |

Head coach

- Clem Haskins

Assistant coach(es)

Legend

- (C) Team captain
- (S) Suspended
- (I) Ineligible
- (W) Walk-on
- Injured
- Current redshirt

== Schedule and results ==
| Date time, TV | Rank^{#} | Opponent^{#} | Result | Record | Site city, state |
Non-conference Regular Season
| Nov 24, 1994* | | vs. No. 5 Arizona; Great Alaska Shootout | W 72–70 | 1–0 | Sullivan Arena; Anchorage, Alaska |
| Nov 25, 1994* | | vs. No. 21 Villanova; Great Alaska Shootout | W 85–64 | 2–0 | Sullivan Arena; Anchorage, Alaska |
| Nov 26, 1994* | | vs. BYU; Great Alaska Shootout | W 79–74 | 3–0 | Sullivan Arena; Anchorage, Alaska |
| Nov 29, 1994* | No. 15 | Sacramento State | W 102–84 | 4–0 | Williams Arena; Minneapolis, Minnesota |
| Dec 1, 1994* | No. 15 | Central Connecticut State | W 92–56 | 5–0 | Williams Arena; Minneapolis, Minnesota |
| Dec 11, 1994* | No. 12 | Rhode Island | W 90–65 | 6–0 | Williams Arena; Minneapolis, Minnesota |
| Dec 13, 1994* | No. 11 | No. 17 Cincinnati | L 88–91 ^{OT} | 6–1 | Williams Arena; Minneapolis, Minnesota |
| Dec 17, 1994* | No. 11 | at California | L 75–82 | 6–2 | Harmon Gym; Berkeley, California |
| Dec 21, 1994* | No. 16 | Texas Southern | L 50–71 | 6–3 | Williams Arena; Minneapolis, Minnesota |
| Dec 28, 1994* | No. 16 | at James Madison | W 74–68 | 7–3 | JMU Convocation Center; Harrisonburg, Virginia |
Big Ten Regular Season
NCAA Tournament
| Mar 16, 1995* | (8 E) | vs. (9 E) Saint Louis; First Round | L 61–64 ^{OT} | 19–12 | Baltimore Arena; Baltimore, Maryland |
*Non-conference game. ^{#}Rankings from AP Poll. (#) Tournament seedings in parentheses. E=East.
