= 1994–95 NCAA Division I men's basketball rankings =

- Season: 1994–95
- NCAA Tournament: 1995
- Preseason No. 1: Arkansas
- NCAA Tournament Champions: UCLA
NCAA Division I men's basketball rankings


The 1994–95 NCAA Division I men's basketball rankings was made up of two human polls, the AP Poll and the Coaches Poll, in addition to various other preseason polls.

== Legend ==
	Increase in ranking
	Decrease in ranking
	New to rankings from previous week
Italics	Number of first place votes
(#–#)	Win–loss record
т	Tied with team above or below also with this symbol

== AP Poll ==
Six different teams held the top spot for at least one week – North Carolina (6), UMass (5), UCLA (3), Arkansas (2), Connecticut (1), and Kansas (1).

	Preseason	Week 1 Nov. 21	Week 2 Nov. 28	Week 3 Dec. 5	Week 4 Dec. 12	Week 5 Dec. 19	Week 6 Dec. 26	Week 7 Jan. 2	Week 8 Jan. 9	Week 9 Jan. 16	Week 10 Jan. 23	Week 11 Jan. 30	Week 12 Feb. 6	Week 13 Feb. 13	Week 14 Feb. 20	Week 15 Feb. 27	Week 16 Mar. 6	Final Mar. 13	
1.	Arkansas	Arkansas (0–0)	UMass (1–0)	North Carolina (4–0)	North Carolina (5–0)	North Carolina (6–0)	North Carolina (7–0)	North Carolina (9–0)	UMass (8–1)	UMass (11–1)	UMass (13–1)	UMass (15–1)	North Carolina (18–1)	Connecticut (19–1)	Kansas (20–3)	UCLA (21–2)	UCLA (23–2)	UCLA (25–2)	1.
2.	North Carolina	North Carolina (0–0)	North Carolina (1–0)	UCLA (2–0)	UCLA (3–0)	UCLA (4–0)	UCLA (5–0)	UCLA (6–0)	Connecticut (10–0)	Connecticut (12–0)	Connecticut (14–0)	North Carolina (16–1)	Kansas (17–2)	North Carolina (19–2)	UCLA (18–2)	North Carolina (21–3)	Kansas (22–4)	Kentucky (25–4)	2.
3.	UMass	UMass (0–0)	Kentucky (1–0)	Arkansas (3–1)	Kansas (5–0)	Arkansas (6–1)	Arkansas (8–1)	Arkansas (11–1)	Kansas (10–1)	North Carolina (12–1)	North Carolina (14–1)	Kansas (15–2)	Connecticut (17–1)	Kansas (18–3)	North Carolina (20–3)	Kansas (21–4)	Kentucky (22–4)	Wake Forest (24–5)	3.
4.	Kentucky	Kentucky (0–0)	Arkansas (1–1)	Kansas (2–0)	Arkansas (6–1)	UMass (5–1)	UMass (5–1)	UMass (5–1)	North Carolina (10–1)	UCLA (9–1)	UCLA (11–1)	Connecticut (15–1)	UMass (17–2)	Kentucky (17–3)	Connecticut (20–2)	Connecticut (22–2)	North Carolina (22–4)	North Carolina (24–5)	4.
5.	UCLA	Arizona (0–0)	UCLA (1–0)	UMass (1–1)	UMass (3–1)	Kentucky (5–1)	Kentucky (5–1)	Kansas (8–1)	Arkansas (12–2)	Kentucky (10–2)	Kentucky (12–2)	Maryland (16–3)	Kentucky (15–3)	UMass (18–2)	UMass (20–3)	Kentucky (20–4)	Arkansas (25–5)	Kansas (23–5)	5.
6.	Arizona	UCLA (0–0)	Duke (2–0)	Florida (3–0)	Kentucky (4–1)	Arizona (7–1)	Kansas (7–1)	Connecticut (7–0)	UCLA (7–1)	Syracuse (12–1)	Syracuse (14–1)	Kentucky (13–3)	UCLA (14–2)	UCLA (16–2)	Kentucky (18–4)	Maryland (22–5)	Connecticut (23–3)	Arkansas (27–6)	6.
7.	Indiana	Maryland (0–0)	Kansas (1–0)	Kentucky (2–1)	Arizona (5–1)	Kansas (5–1)	Duke (6–1)	Maryland (10–2)	Kentucky (8–2)	Kansas (11–2)	Kansas (13–2)	UCLA (12–2)	Michigan State (16–2)	Maryland (19–4)	Maryland (20–5)	Arkansas (23–5)	Wake Forest (21–5)	UMass (26–4)	7.
8.	Syracuse	Duke (0–0)	Florida (1–0)	Arizona (3–1)	Florida (4–1)	Florida (5–1)	Connecticut (5–0)	Kentucky (6–2)	Syracuse (10–1)	Maryland (13–3)	Maryland (14–3)	Arkansas (16–4)	Maryland (17–4)	Michigan State (17–3)	Arkansas (21–5)	UMass (21–4)	UMass (24–4)	Connecticut (25–4)	8.
9.	Duke	Kansas (0–0)	Arizona (2–1)	Duke (3–1)	Duke (5–1)	Duke (5–1)	Maryland (8–2)	Arizona (9–2)	Maryland (11–3)	Arkansas (13–3)	Arkansas (15–3)	Michigan State (14–2)	Arizona (17–4)	Missouri (18–3)	Villanova (19–5)	Wake Forest (19–5)	Michigan State (21–4)	Villanova (25–7)	9.
10.	Virginia	Florida (0–0)	Cincinnati (1–0)	Connecticut (3–0)	Connecticut (4–0)	Connecticut (4–0)	Arizona (7–2)	Syracuse (8–1)	Georgetown (9–1)	Georgetown (11–1)	Michigan State (12–2)	Syracuse (15–2)	Syracuse (16–3)	Arkansas (19–5)	Wake Forest (17–5)	Michigan State (20–4)	Maryland (23–6)	Maryland (24–7)	10.
11.	Cincinnati	Indiana (0–0)	Maryland (2–1)	Maryland (4–1)	Minnesota (6–0)	Maryland (7–2)	Syracuse (7–1)	Duke (9–2)	Michigan State (9–1)	Arizona (12–3)	Iowa State (15–2)	Iowa State (17–2)	Wake Forest (14–4)	Syracuse (17–4)	Virginia (18–6)	Villanova (21–6)	Virginia (21–7)	Michigan State (22–5)	11.
12.	Kansas	Cincinnati (0–0)	Arizona State (3–0)	Minnesota (5–0)	Maryland (6–2)	Georgetown (5–1)	Georgetown (5–1)	Georgetown (7–1)	Arizona State (11–2)	Michigan State (10–2)	Arizona (13–4)	Arizona (15–4)	Arkansas (17–5)	Arizona (18–5)	Michigan State (18–4)	Arizona (21–6)	Arizona (23–6)	Purdue (24–6)	12.
13.	Florida	Michigan (0–0)	Wisconsin (1–0)	Cincinnati (3–1)	Arizona State (4–1)	Cincinnati (6–2)	Florida (5–2)	Florida (6–2)	Arizona (10–3)	Arizona State (12–3)	Arizona State (13–4)	Georgetown (14–3)	Missouri (16–3)	Arizona State (18–5)	Arizona (19–6)	Virginia (19–7)	Villanova (22–7)	Virginia (22–8)	13.
14.	Maryland	Georgetown (0–0)	Ohio (4–0)	Wisconsin (3–0)	Georgia Tech (5–0)	Syracuse (5–1)	California (6–0)	Michigan State (7–1)	Wake Forest (8–1)	Iowa State (13–2)	Georgetown (12–3)	Wake Forest (12–4)	Arizona State (16–5)	Wake Forest (15–5)	Missouri (18–4)	Mississippi State (19–5)	Purdue (22–6)	Oklahoma State (23–9)	14.
15.	Georgetown	Wisconsin (0–0)	Minnesota (3–0)	Michigan State (2–0)	Georgetown (4–1)	Arizona State (5–2)	Michigan State (5–1)	Arizona State (9–2)	Florida (7–3)	Wake Forest (9–2)	Virginia (11–4)	Virginia (12–5)	Stanford (15–3)	Villanova (17–5)	Arizona State (19–6)	Arizona State (20–7)	Mississippi State (20–6)	Arizona (23–7)	15.
16.	Michigan	Connecticut (0–0)	Connecticut (1–0)	Arizona State (4–1)	Syracuse (4–1)	Minnesota (6–2)	Arizona State (5–1)	Iowa State (10–1)	Duke (9–4)	Missouri (12–2)	Wake Forest (10–3)	Arizona State (14–5)	Villanova (15–5)	Virginia (16–6)	Mississippi State (17–5)	Oklahoma (21–6)	Oklahoma (22–7)	Arizona State (22–8)	16.
17.	Wisconsin	Michigan State (0–0)	Michigan (2–1)	Georgia Tech (4–0)	Cincinnati (4–2)	Michigan State (4–1)	Georgia Tech (7–1)	California (7–1)	Missouri (10–1)	Oregon (11–1)	Stanford (12–2)	Stanford (13–3)	Virginia (13–6)	Stanford (15–5)	Syracuse (17–6)	Purdue (20–6)	Missouri (19–7)	Oklahoma (23–8)	17.
18.	Connecticut	Syracuse (0–1)	Michigan State (0–0)	Georgetown (2–1)	Michigan State (2–1)	Georgia Tech (6–1)	Wake Forest (6–1)	Wake Forest (7–1)	Clemson (10–0)	Virginia (10–3)	Oregon (12–2)	Missouri (14–3)	Georgia Tech (15–6)	Alabama (17–5)	Oklahoma State (18–7)	Oklahoma State (19–8)	Arizona State (21–8)	Mississippi State (20–7)	18.
19.	Alabama	Oklahoma State (0–0)	Georgetown (0–1)	Syracuse (3–1)	Ohio (6–2)	Wake Forest (5–1)	Wisconsin (6–1)	Nebraska (11–1)	Iowa (11–3)	New Mexico State (12–3)	Cincinnati (14–5)	Villanova (13–5)	Iowa State (17–5)	Oregon (14–5)	Stanford (16–5)	Missouri (18–6)	Oklahoma State (20–9)	Utah (27–5)	19.
20.	Michigan State	Virginia (1–1)	Georgia Tech (1–0)	Virginia (3–1)	Wisconsin (4–1)	Wisconsin (5–1)	Cincinnati (7–3)	New Mexico State (9–2)	California (8–2)	Illinois (13–3)	Missouri (13–3)	Alabama (14–4)	Georgetown (14–5)	Georgia Tech (15–8)	Alabama (18–6)	Stanford (17–6)	Alabama (20–8)	Alabama (22–9)	20.
21.	Villanova	Villanova (0–0)	Wake Forest (1–0)	Ohio (5–2)	Wake Forest (4–1)	New Mexico State (7–2)	Iowa State (8–1)	Indiana (8–4)	Penn (8–1)	Stanford (11–2)	Georgia Tech (11–6)	Georgia Tech (13–6)	Mississippi State (14–4)	Iowa State (18–6)	Purdue (18–6)	Alabama (19–7)	Syracuse (19–8)	Western Kentucky (26–3)	21.
22.	Oklahoma State т	Georgia Tech (0–0)	Syracuse (0–1)	New Mexico State (5–1)	Villanova (4–2)	Virginia (5–2)	New Mexico State (8–2)	Iowa (10–2)	Georgia Tech (9–4)	Georgia Tech (9–5)	Villanova (11–5)	Oregon (12–4)	Oregon (13–5)	Oklahoma State (16–7)	Minnesota (17–7)	Syracuse (18–7)	Utah (24–5)	Georgetown (19–9)	22.
23.	Georgia Tech т	Ohio (2–0)	Virginia (1–1)	Michigan (3–2)	Virginia (5–2)	Illinois (7–1)	Nebraska (9–1)	Stanford (9–0)	Iowa State (11–2)	Cincinnati (12–5)	Florida (9–5)	Cincinnati (15–6)	Alabama (15–5)	Mississippi State (15–5)	Iowa State (19–7)	Georgetown (17–7)	Western Kentucky (25–3)	Missouri (19–8)	23.
24.	Wake Forest	Wake Forest (0–0)	Villanova (2–1)	Villanova (3–1)	New Mexico State (6–2)	California (5–0)	Indiana (6–4)	Georgia Tech (8–3)	New Mexico State (10–3)	Florida (7–5)	New Mexico State (13–4)	Oklahoma (15–4)	Oklahoma State (16–6)	Minnesota (16–6)	Georgia Tech (16–9)	Iowa State (19–7)	Georgetown (18–8)	Iowa State (22–10)	24.
25.	Illinois	Alabama (1–1)	New Mexico State (3–1)	Wake Forest (2–1)	Michigan (4–3)	Iowa State (7–1)	St. John's (7–0)	Penn (6–1)	Oregon (10–1)	Penn (8–2)	Oklahoma (14–3)	Florida (10–6)	Purdue (15–5)	Purdue (16–6)	Oklahoma (19–6)	Xavier (23–3)	Oregon (18–7)	Syracuse (19–9)	25.
	Preseason	Week 1 Nov. 21	Week 2 Nov. 28	Week 3 Dec. 5	Week 4 Dec. 12	Week 5 Dec. 19	Week 6 Dec. 26	Week 7 Jan. 2	Week 8 Jan. 9	Week 9 Jan. 16	Week 10 Jan. 23	Week 11 Jan. 30	Week 12 Feb. 6	Week 13 Feb. 13	Week 14 Feb. 20	Week 15 Feb. 27	Week 16 Mar. 6	Final Mar. 13	
		Dropped: Illinois (0–0)	Dropped: Indiana (1–2); Oklahoma State; Alabama	None	None	Dropped: Ohio; Villanova; Michigan	Dropped: Minnesota (7–3); Virginia; Illinois	Dropped: Wisconsin; Cincinnati (8–5); St. John's	Dropped: Nebraska; Indiana (9–5); Stanford	Dropped: Duke; Clemson (10–2); Iowa (11–5); California	Dropped: Illinois; Penn	Dropped: New Mexico State (14–5)	Dropped: Cincinnati; Oklahoma; Florida	Dropped: Georgetown (14–6)	Dropped: Oregon (15–6)	Dropped: Minnesota; Georgia Tech	Dropped: Stanford (17–8); Iowa State (20–9); Xavier	Dropped: Oregon (19–8)	

== Coaches Poll ==
	Preseason	Week 2 Nov. 28	Week 3 Dec. 5	Week 4 Dec. 12	Week 5 Dec. 19	Week 6 Dec. 26	Week 7 Jan. 2	Week 8 Jan. 9	Week 9 Jan. 16	Week 10 Jan. 23	Week 11 Jan. 30	Week 12 Feb. 6	Week 13 Feb. 13	Week 14 Feb. 20	Week 15 Feb. 27	Week 16 Mar. 6	Week 17 Mar. 13	Final Apr. 4	
1.	Arkansas	UMass (1–0)	North Carolina (4–0)	North Carolina (5–0)	North Carolina (6–0)	North Carolina (7–0)	North Carolina (9–0)	UMass (8–1)	UMass (11–1)	UMass (13–1)	UMass (15–1)	North Carolina (18–1)	Connecticut (19–1)	Kansas (20–3)	UCLA (21–2)	UCLA (23–2)	UCLA (25–2)	UCLA (31–2)	1.
2.	North Carolina	North Carolina (1–0)	UCLA (2–0)	UCLA (3–0)	UCLA (4–0)	UCLA (5–0)	UCLA (6–0)	North Carolina (10–1)	Connecticut (12–0)	Connecticut (14–0)	North Carolina (16–1)	Kansas (17–2)	North Carolina (19–2)	North Carolina (20–3)	North Carolina (21–3)	Kansas (22–4)	Kentucky (25–4)	Arkansas (32–7)	2.
3.	UMass	Kentucky (1–0)	Arkansas (3–1)	Arkansas (6–1)	Arkansas (6–1)	Arkansas (8–1)	Arkansas (11–1)	Connecticut (10–0)	North Carolina (12–1)	North Carolina (14–1)	Kansas (15–2)	Kentucky (15–3)	Kansas (18–3) т	UCLA (18–2)	Kentucky (20–4)	North Carolina (22–4)	Wake Forest (24–5)	North Carolina (28–6)	3.
4.	Kentucky	UCLA (1–0)	Kansas (2–0)	Kansas (5–0)	UMass (5–1)	UMass (5–1)	UMass (5–1)	Arkansas (12–2)	UCLA (9–1)	UCLA (11–1)	Kentucky (13–3)	Connecticut (17–1)	Kentucky (17–3) т	Kentucky (18–4)	Kansas (21–4)	Kentucky (22–4)	Kansas (23–5)	Oklahoma State (27–10)	4.
5.	UCLA	Arkansas (1–1)	UMass (1–1)	UMass (3–1)	Duke (5–1)	Kentucky (5–1)	Kansas (8–1)	Kansas (10–1)	Kentucky (10–2)	Kentucky (12–2)	Connecticut (15–1)	UMass (17–2)	UMass (18–2)	Connecticut (20–2)	Connecticut (22–2)	Connecticut (23–3)	North Carolina (24–5)	Kentucky (28–5)	5.
6.	Arizona	Duke (2–0)	Duke (3–1)	Kentucky (4–1)	Kentucky (5–1)	Connecticut (5–0)	Kentucky (6–2)	UCLA (7–1)	Syracuse (12–1)	Syracuse (14–1)	UCLA (12–2)	UCLA (14–2)	UCLA (16–2)	UMass (20–3)	Maryland (22–5)	Arkansas (25–5)	Arkansas (27–6)	Connecticut (28–5)	6.
7.	Indiana	Kansas (1–0)	Kentucky (2–1)	Arizona (5–1)	Arizona (7–1)	Duke (6–1)	Connecticut (7–0)	Kentucky (8–2)	Arkansas (13–3)	Kansas (13–2)	Syracuse (15–2)	Michigan State (16–2)	Maryland (19–4)	Maryland (20–5)	Arkansas (23–5)	UMass (24–4)	UMass (26–4)	UMass (29–5)	7.
8.	Syracuse	Arizona (2–1)	Arizona (3–1)	Florida (4–1)	Florida (5–1)	Kansas (7–1)	Arizona (9–2)	Syracuse (10–1)	Kansas (11–2)	Arkansas (15–3)	Maryland (16–3)	Arizona (17–4)	Michigan State (17–3)	Arkansas (21–5)	UMass (21–4)	Wake Forest (21–5)	Connecticut (25–4)	Virginia (25–9)	8.
9.	Duke	Cincinnati (1–0)	Florida (3–0)	Duke (5–1)	Connecticut (4–0)	Arizona (7–2)	Duke (9–2)	Arizona (10–3)	Maryland (13–3)	Maryland (14–3)	Arkansas (16–4)	Syracuse (16–3)	Syracuse (17–4)	Arizona (19–6)	Michigan State (20–4)	Michigan State (21–4)	Michigan State (22–5)	Wake Forest (26–6)	9.
10.	Virginia	Maryland (2–1)	Connecticut (3–0)	Connecticut (4–0)	Kansas (5–1)	Syracuse (7–1)	Syracuse (8–1)	Arizona State (11–2)	Georgetown (11–1)	Arizona (13–4)	Michigan State (14–2)	Maryland (17–4)	Arizona (18–5)	Michigan State (18–4)	Arizona (21–6)	Maryland (23–6)	Maryland (24–7)	Kansas (25–6)	10.
11.	Cincinnati	Minnesota (3–0)	Maryland (4–1)	Minnesota (6–0)	Maryland (7–2)	Maryland (8–2)	Maryland (10–2)	Michigan State (9–1)	Arizona (12–3)	Michigan State (12–2)	Iowa State (17–2)	Arkansas (17–5)	Missouri (18–3)	Villanova (19–5)	Wake Forest (19–5)	Arizona (23–6)	Purdue (24–6)	Maryland (26–8)	11.
12.	Kansas	Florida (1–0)	Minnesota (5–0)	Maryland (6–2)	Arizona State (5–2)	Florida (5–2)	Florida (6–2)	Georgetown (9–1)	Michigan State (10–2)	Iowa State (15–2)	Arizona (15–4)	Missouri (16–3)	Arkansas (19–5)	Wake Forest (17–5)	Villanova (21–6)	Virginia (21–7)	Villanova (25–7)	Mississippi State (22–8)	12.
13.	Florida	Arizona State (3–0)	Cincinnati (3–1)	Georgia Tech (5–0)	Cincinnati (6–2)	Arizona State (5–1)	Georgetown (7–1)	Maryland (11–3)	Arizona State (12–3)	Georgetown (12–3)	Georgetown (14–3)	Wake Forest (14–4)	Arizona State (18–5)	Virginia (18–6)	Virginia (19–7)	Purdue (22–6)	Arizona (23–7)	Arizona State (24–9)	13.
14.	Maryland	Connecticut (1–0)	Wisconsin (3–0)	Syracuse (4–1)	Georgetown (5–1)	Georgetown (5–1)	Arizona State (9–2)	Duke (9–4)	Missouri (12–2)	Arizona State (13–4)	Arizona State (14–5)	Arizona State (16–5)	Wake Forest (15–5)	Arizona State (19–6)	Arizona State (20–7)	Villanova (22–7)	Oklahoma State (23–9)	Memphis State (24–10)	14.
15.	Georgetown	Ohio (4–0)	Georgia Tech (4–0)	Arizona State (4–1)	Minnesota (6–2)	Michigan State (5–1)	Michigan State (7–1)	Florida (7–3)	Iowa State (13–2)	Wake Forest (10–3)	Wake Forest (12–4)	Georgia Tech (15–6)	Villanova (17–5)	Missouri (18–4)	Syracuse (18–7)	Mississippi State (20–6)	Virginia (22–8)	Tulsa (24–8)	15.
16.	Michigan	Michigan (2–1)	Arizona State (4–1)	Georgetown (4–1)	Syracuse (5–1)	Georgia Tech (7–1)	California (7–1)	Wake Forest (8–1)	Wake Forest (9–2)	Missouri (13–3)	Missouri (14–3)	Stanford (15–3)	Virginia (16–6)	Syracuse (17–6)	Purdue (20–6)	Arizona State (21–8)	Arizona State (22–8)	Georgetown (21–10)	16.
17.	Wisconsin	Georgetown (0–1)	Michigan State (2–0)	Cincinnati (4–2)	Michigan State (4–1)	California (6–0)	New Mexico State (9–2)	Georgia Tech (9–4)	New Mexico State (12–3)	Virginia (11–4)	Virginia (12–5)	Virginia (13–6)	Georgia Tech (15–8)	Oklahoma State (18–7)	Mississippi State (19–5)	Oklahoma State (20–9)	Utah (27–5)	Syracuse (20–10)	17.
18.	Connecticut	Wisconsin (1–0)	Georgetown (2–1)	Michigan State (2–1)	New Mexico State (7–2)	Cincinnati (7–3)	Nebraska (11–1)	New Mexico State (10–3)	Georgia Tech (9–5)	Cincinnati (14–5)	Stanford (13–3)	Villanova (15–5)	Oregon (14–5)	Stanford (16–5)	Oklahoma (21–6)	Oklahoma (22–7)	Iowa State (22–10)	Missouri (20–9)	18.
19.	Alabama	Georgia Tech (1–0)	Syracuse (3–1)	New Mexico State (6–2)	Georgia Tech (6–1)	New Mexico State (8–2)	Indiana (8–4)	Iowa (11–3)	Virginia (10–3)	Stanford (12–2)	Villanova (13–5)	Georgetown (14–5)	Stanford (15–5)	Mississippi State (17–5)	Stanford (17–6)	Missouri (19–7)	Mississippi State (20–7)	Purdue (25–7)	19.
20.	Michigan State	Syracuse (0–1)	Michigan (3–2)	Virginia (5–2)	Wisconsin (5–1)	Indiana (6–4)	Georgia Tech (8–3)	Missouri (10–1)	Florida (7–5)	New Mexico State (13–4)	Georgia Tech (13–6)	Oregon (13–5)	Oklahoma State (16–7)	Purdue (18–6)	Oklahoma State (19–8)	Syracuse (19–8)	Oklahoma (23–8)	Michigan State (22–6)	20.
21.	Villanova	Texas (0–1)	New Mexico State (5–1)	Ohio (6–2)	Virginia (5–2)	Wisconsin (6–1)	Iowa State (10–1)	Penn (8–1)	Oregon (11–1)	Georgia Tech (11–6)	Oregon (12–4)	Iowa State (17–5)	BYU (20–5)	Minnesota (17–7)	Missouri (18–6)	Utah (24–5)	Alabama (22–9)	Alabama (23–10)	21.
22.	Oklahoma State т	Indiana (1–2)	Ohio (5–2)	Michigan (4–3)	Wake Forest (5–1)	Wake Forest (6–1)	Wake Forest (7–1)	California (8–2)	Illinois (13–3)	Oregon (12–2)	Cincinnati (15–6)	New Mexico State (16–5)	Georgetown (14–6)	Georgia Tech (16–9)	Alabama (19–7) т	Alabama (20–8)	Syracuse (19–9)	Utah (28–6)	22.
23.	Georgia Tech т	BYU (2–1)	Virginia (3–1)	Wisconsin (4–1)	Indiana (5–4)	Nebraska (9–1)	Iowa (10–2)	Indiana (9–5)	Stanford (11–2)	Florida (9–5)	New Mexico State (14–5)	Mississippi State (14–4)	Iowa State (18–6)	Oregon (15–6)	Georgetown (17–7) т	Oregon (18–7)	Missouri (19–8)	Villanova (25–8)	23.
24.	Wake Forest	New Mexico State (3–1)	BYU (3–2)	Nebraska (6–1)	Nebraska (7–1)	Iowa State (8–1)	Cincinnati (8–5)	Iowa State (11–2)	Clemson (10–2)	Iowa (12–5)	Alabama (14–4)	Minnesota (15–6)	Purdue (16–6)	Iowa State (19–7)	Iowa State (19–7) т	Stanford (17–8)	Oregon (19–8)	Texas (23–7)	24.
25.	Memphis State	Michigan State (0–0)	Indiana (2–3)	Villanova (4–2)	Oklahoma State (7–2)	Minnesota (7–3)	Virginia Tech (10–1)	Clemson (10–0)	Iowa (11–5)	Villanova (11–5)	Oklahoma (15–4)	Purdue (15–5)	Minnesota (16–6)	Alabama (18–6)	Utah (23–5)	Iowa State (20–9)	Stanford (19–8)	Arizona (23–8)	25.
	Preseason	Week 2 Nov. 28	Week 3 Dec. 5	Week 4 Dec. 12	Week 5 Dec. 19	Week 6 Dec. 26	Week 7 Jan. 2	Week 8 Jan. 9	Week 9 Jan. 16	Week 10 Jan. 23	Week 11 Jan. 30	Week 12 Feb. 6	Week 13 Feb. 13	Week 14 Feb. 20	Week 15 Feb. 27	Week 16 Mar. 6	Week 17 Mar. 13	Final Apr. 4	
		Dropped: Virginia (1–1); Alabama; Villanova (2–1); Oklahoma State; Wake Forest (1–0); Memphis State	Dropped: Texas	Dropped: BYU; Indiana	Dropped: Ohio; Villanova; Michigan	Dropped: Virginia; Oklahoma State	Dropped: Wisconsin; Minnesota	Dropped: Nebraska; Cincinnati; Virginia Tech	Dropped: Duke; Penn (8–2); California; Indiana	Dropped: Illinois; Clemson	Dropped: Florida (10–6); Iowa	Dropped: Cincinnati; Alabama (15–5); Oklahoma	Dropped: New Mexico State; Mississippi State (15–5)	Dropped: BYU; Georgetown	Dropped: Minnesota; Georgia Tech; Oregon	Dropped: Georgetown	None	Dropped: Oklahoma (23–9); Iowa State (23–11); Oregon (19–9); Stanford (20–9)	
