= 1994–95 Purdue Boilermakers men's basketball team =

American college basketball season

1994–95 Purdue Boilermakers men's basketball

Big Ten Regular season champions Big Island Invitational champions

NCAA Tournament, second round
- Conference: Big Ten Conference

Ranking
- Coaches: No. 19
- AP: No. 12
- Record: 25–7 (15–3 Big Ten)
- Head coach: Gene Keady (15th season)
- Assistant coaches: Frank Kendrick; Bruce Weber
- Home arena: Mackey Arena

1994–95 Big Ten Conference men's basketball standings
| | Conf. | | | | Overall |
| Team | W | | L | PCT | W | | L | PCT |
|---|---|---|---|---|---|---|---|---|
| No. 12 Purdue | 15 | – | 3 | .833 | 25 | – | 7 | .781 |
| No. 11 Michigan State | 14 | – | 4 | .778 | 22 | – | 6 | .786 |
| Indiana | 11 | – | 7 | .611 | 19 | – | 12 | .613 |
| Michigan | 11 | – | 7 | .611 | 17 | – | 14 | .548 |
| Illinois | 10 | – | 8 | .556 | 19 | – | 12 | .613 |
| Minnesota | 10 | – | 8 | .556 | 20 | – | 11 | .645 |
| Penn State | 9 | – | 9 | .500 | 21 | – | 11 | .656 |
| Iowa | 9 | – | 9 | .500 | 21 | – | 12 | .636 |
| Wisconsin | 7 | – | 11 | .389 | 13 | – | 14 | .481 |
| Ohio State | 2 | – | 16 | .111 | 6 | – | 22 | .214 |
| Northwestern | 1 | – | 17 | .056 | 5 | – | 22 | .185 |
Rankings from AP Poll; *Minnesota 1 NCAA Tourn. game vacated due to sanctions against the program; 1 Win by forfeit (non-conf.); Disputed record (19-12)

The 1994–95 Purdue Boilermakers men's basketball team represented Purdue University as a member of the Big Ten Conference during the 1994–95 NCAA Division I men's basketball season. The team was led by Gene Keady and played its home games at Mackey Arena.

== Roster ==
1994–95 Purdue Boilermakers men's basketball team
Players
Coaches

| Pos. | # | Name | Height | Weight | Year | Previous school | Hometown |
|---|---|---|---|---|---|---|---|
| G | 11 | Matt Waddell | 6 ft 4 in (1.93 m) | — | Sr |
| G | 15 | Tim Ervin | 5 ft 6 in (1.68 m) | — | Sr |
| G | 20 | Todd Foster | 6 ft 1 in (1.85 m) | — | Jr |
| F | 21 | Herb Dove | 6 ft 5 in (1.96 m) | — | Jr |
| F | 22 | Cuonzo Martin | 6 ft 5 in (1.96 m) | — | Sr | East St. Louis | East St. Louis, Illinois |
| G | 23 | Porter Roberts | 6 ft 3 in (1.91 m) | — | Jr |
| F | 25 | Roy Hairston | 6 ft 7 in (2.01 m) | — | Jr |
| F | 33 | Justin Jennings | 6 ft 6 in (1.98 m) | 200 lb (91 kg) | Jr | Central | Grand Rapids, Michigan |
| F | 42 | Brandon Brantley | 6 ft 8 in (2.03 m) | — | Jr |
| F | 52 | Brad Miller | 6 ft 11 in (2.11 m) | 235 lb (107 kg) | Fr | East Noble | Kendallville, Indiana |
| F | 55 | Paul Gilvydis | 6 ft 9 in (2.06 m) | 225 lb (102 kg) | So | Harrison | Farmington Hills, Michigan |

Head coach

- Gene Keady (Kansas State)

Assistant coach(es)

- Frank Kendrick (Purdue)
- Bruce Weber (Milwaukee)

Legend

- (C) Team captain
- (S) Suspended
- (I) Ineligible
- (W) Walk-on
- Injured
- Current redshirt

== Schedule and results ==
| Date time, TV | Rank^{#} | Opponent^{#} | Result | Record | Site city, state |
Non-conference regular season
| Nov 25, 1994* | | vs. Niagara; Big Island Invitational | W 71–60 | 1–0 | Afook-Chinen Civic Auditorium; Hilo, Hawaii |
| Nov 26, 1994* | | vs. New Orleans; Big Island Invitational | W 84–71 | 2–0 | Afook-Chinen Civic Auditorium; Hilo, Hawaii |
| Nov 27, 1994* | | vs. Iowa State; Big Island Invitational | W 88–87 ^{OT} | 3–0 | Afook-Chinen Civic Auditorium; Hilo, Hawaii |
| Nov 30, 1994* | | vs. Missouri | L 66–69 | 3–1 | |
| Dec 3, 1994* | | at James Madison | L 87–91 | 3–2 | JMU Convocation Center; Harrisonburg, Virginia |
| Dec 6, 1994* | | at Western Michigan | L 81–90 | 3–3 | University Arena; Kalamazoo, Michigan |
| Dec 9, 1994* | | Austin Peay | W 81–64 | 4–3 | Mackey Arena; West Lafayette, Indiana |
| Dec 10, 1994* | | Rutgers | W 79–67 | 5–3 | Mackey Arena; West Lafayette, Indiana |
| Dec 17, 1994* | | vs. New Orleans | W 76–68 | 6–3 | |
| Dec 22, 1994* | | at Chattanooga | W 94–77 | 7–3 | McKenzie Arena; Chattanooga, Tennessee |
| Dec 28, 1994* | | Weber State | W 89–75 | 8–3 | Mackey Arena; West Lafayette, Indiana |
| Dec 30, 1994* | | Central Michigan | W 74–66 | 9–3 | Mackey Arena; West Lafayette, Indiana |
Big Ten regular season
| Jan 3, 1995 | | at Michigan | L 61–71 | 9–4 (0–1) | Crisler Arena; Ann Arbor, Michigan |
| Jan 7, 1995 | | Minnesota | W 68–60 | 10–4 (1–1) | Mackey Arena; West Lafayette, Indiana |
| Jan 10, 1995 | | Illinois | L 58–62 | 10–5 (1–2) | Mackey Arena; West Lafayette, Indiana |
| Jan 14, 1995 | | at No. 19 Iowa | W 84–83 | 11–5 (2–2) | Carver-Hawkeye Arena; Iowa City, Iowa |
| Jan 21, 1995 | | Ohio State | W 92–66 | 12–5 (3–2) | Mackey Arena; West Lafayette, Indiana |
| Jan 25, 1995 | | at Northwestern | W 96–84 | 13–5 (4–2) | Welsh-Ryan Arena; Evanston, Illinois |
| Jan 28, 1995 | | at Penn State | W 65–62 | 14–5 (5–2) | Rec Hall; University Park, Pennsylvania |
| Jan 31, 1995 | | Indiana | W 76–66 | 15–5 (6–2) | Mackey Arena; West Lafayette, Indiana |
| Feb 7, 1995 | No. 25 | at No. 7 Michigan State | W 78–69 | 16–5 (7–2) | Breslin Center; East Lansing, Michigan |
| Feb 12, 1995* | No. 25 | at Indiana | L 73–82 | 16–6 (7–3) | Assembly Hall; Bloomington, Indiana |
| Feb 15, 1995 | No. 25 | Penn State | W 71–51 | 17–6 (8–3) | Mackey Arena; West Lafayette, Indiana |
| Feb 18, 1995 | No. 25 | Northwestern | W 94–57 | 18–6 (9–3) | Mackey Arena; West Lafayette, Indiana |
| Feb 22, 1995 | No. 21 | at Ohio State | W 64–55 | 19–6 (10–3) | St. John Arena; Columbus, Ohio |
| Feb 26, 1995* | No. 21 | Wisconsin | W 66–56 | 20–6 (11–3) | Mackey Arena; West Lafayette, Indiana |
| Mar 1, 1995 | No. 17 | Iowa | W 92–85 | 21–6 (12–3) | Mackey Arena; West Lafayette, Indiana |
| Mar 4, 1995 | No. 17 | at Illinois | W 69–56 | 22–6 (13–3) | Assembly Hall; Champaign, Illinois |
| Mar 9, 1995 | No. 14 | at Minnesota | W 72–59 | 23–6 (14–3) | Williams Arena; Minneapolis, Minnesota |
| Mar 12, 1995 | No. 14 | Michigan | W 73–67 | 24–6 (15–3) | Mackey Arena; West Lafayette, Indiana |
NCAA Tournament
| Mar 17, 1995* | (3 MW) No. 12 | vs. (14 MW) Wisconsin-Green Bay; First round | W 49–48 | 25–6 | Frank Erwin Center; Austin, Texas |
| Mar 19, 1995*; CBS | (3 MW) No. 12 | vs. (6 MW) Memphis; Second round | L 73–75 | 25–7 | Frank Erwin Center; Austin, Texas |
*Non-conference game. ^{#}Rankings from AP Poll. (#) Tournament seedings in parentheses. MW=Midwest. All times are in Eastern.

== Team players drafted into the NBA ==
| Round | Pick | Player | NBA club |
|---|---|---|---|
| 2 | 57 | Cuonzo Martin | Atlanta Hawks |

== See also ==
- 1995 NCAA Division I men's basketball tournament
- List of NCAA Division I institutions
