= 1994–95 Michigan Wolverines men's basketball team =

American college basketball season

1994–95 Michigan Wolverines men's basketball

NCAA tournament, Round of 64
- Conference: Big Ten Conference
- Record: 17–14 (11–7 Big Ten)
- Head coach: Steve Fisher
- Assistant coaches: Brian Dutcher; Jay Smith; Scott Trost
- MVP: Jimmy King
- Captains: Jimmy King; Ray Jackson
- Home arena: Crisler Arena

1994–95 Big Ten Conference men's basketball standings
	Conf.				Overall
Team	W		L	PCT	W		L	PCT
No. 12 Purdue	15	–	3	.833	25	–	7	.781
No. 11 Michigan State	14	–	4	.778	22	–	6	.786
Indiana	11	–	7	.611	19	–	12	.613
Michigan	11	–	7	.611	17	–	14	.548
Illinois	10	–	8	.556	19	–	12	.613
Minnesota	10	–	8	.556	20	–	11	.645
Penn State	9	–	9	.500	21	–	11	.656
Iowa	9	–	9	.500	21	–	12	.636
Wisconsin	7	–	11	.389	13	–	14	.481
Ohio State	2	–	16	.111	6	–	22	.214
Northwestern	1	–	17	.056	5	–	22	.185
Rankings from AP Poll; *Minnesota 1 NCAA Tourn. game vacated due to sanctions against the program; 1 Win by forfeit (non-conf.); Disputed record (19-12)

The 1994–95 Michigan Wolverines men's basketball team represented the University of Michigan in intercollegiate college basketball during the 1994–95 season. The team played its home games in the Crisler Arena in Ann Arbor, Michigan, and was a member of the Big Ten Conference. Under the direction of head coach Steve Fisher, the team finished tied for third in the Big Ten Conference. The team earned an invitation to the 1995 NCAA Division I men's basketball tournament as a number nine seed where it was eliminated in the first round. The team was ranked for five of the eighteen weeks of Associated Press Top Twenty-Five Poll, starting the season ranked sixteenth, peaking at number thirteen and ending unranked, and it also ended the season unranked in the final USA Today/CNN Poll. The team had a 2–5 record against ranked teams, including the following victories: January 11, 1995, against #19 Iowa 83–82 in double overtime and January 17, 1995, against #20 Illinois 69–59 on the road.

Seniors Jimmy King and Ray Jackson, the last remaining players from the Fab Five, served as team co-captains and shared team MVP honors. The team's leading scorers were Ray Jackson (491 points), Jimmy King (457 points), and Maurice Taylor (384 points). The leading rebounders were Maceo Boston (165), Ray Jackson (163), and Maurice Taylor (158).

Maceo Baston posted a single-season field goal percentage of 67.42%, surpassing the school record 66.12% set by Loy Vaught in 1989. Baston would rebreak the record the following year. The team led the conference in field goal percentage defense (39.4%).

On December 3, 1994, the team totaled 18 single-game steals against UT-Chattanooga, which set the current school record, surpassing the 17 on February 26, 1977.

In the 64-team 1995 NCAA Division I men's basketball tournament, the team earned a number nine seed but was eliminated in the first round Midwest region game by number the eight-seeded and number twenty-one ranked Western Kentucky Hilltoppers 82–76 at University of Dayton Arena, ending the team's season on March 16, 1995.

== Rankings ==
Ranking movements Legend: ██ Increase in ranking ██ Decrease in ranking
	Week																	
Poll	Pre	1	2	3	4	5	6	7	8	9	10	11	12	13	14	15	16	Final
AP Poll	16	13	17	23	25													

== Team players drafted into the NBA ==
Four players from this team were selected in the NBA draft.

Year	Round	Pick	Overall	Player	NBA Club
1995	2	6	35	Jimmy King	Toronto Raptors
1997	1	11	11	Olivier Saint-Jean	Sacramento Kings
1997	1	14	14	Maurice Taylor	Los Angeles Clippers
1998	2	29	58	Maceo Baston	Chicago Bulls

== See also ==
- 1995 NCAA Division I men's basketball tournament
- NCAA Men's Division I tournament bids by school
- NCAA Men's Division I tournament bids by school and conference
- NCAA Division I men's basketball tournament all-time team records
