= 1994–95 Texas Longhorns men's basketball team =

American college basketball season

1994–95 Texas Longhorns men's basketball

Southwest conference regular season and tournament champions

NCAA tournament, second round
- Conference: Southwest Conference

Ranking
- Coaches: No. 24
- Record: 23–7 (11–3 SWC)
- Head coach: Tom Penders (7th season)
- Home arena: Frank Erwin Center

1994–95 Southwest Conference men's basketball standings
	Conf.				Overall
Team	W		L	PCT	W		L	PCT
Texas ^{#}†	11	–	3	.786	23	–	7	.767
Texas Tech ^{#}	11	–	3	.786	20	–	10	.667
TCU	8	–	6	.571	16	–	11	.593
Rice	8	–	6	.571	15	–	13	.536
Texas A&M	7	–	7	.500	14	–	16	.467
Houston	5	–	9	.357	9	–	19	.321
SMU	3	–	11	.214	7	–	20	.259
Baylor	3	–	11	.214	9	–	19	.321
† 1995 SWC tournament winner^{#} conference co-champion Rankings from AP Poll

The 1994–95 Texas Longhorns men's basketball team represented The University of Texas at Austin in intercollegiate basketball competition during the 1994–95 season. The Longhorns were led by seventh-year head coach Tom Penders. The team finished the season with a 23–7 overall record and finished first in Southwest Conference regular season play with an 11–3 conference record. Texas advanced to the NCAA tournament, defeating No. 6 seed Oregon in the opening round before falling to No. 3 seed Maryland in the second round.

== Roster ==
1994–95 Texas Longhorns men's basketball team
Players
Coaches

Pos.	#	Name	Height	Weight	Year	Hometown
G	12	Roderick Anderson	5 ft 10 in (1.78 m)	165 lb (75 kg)	Sr	Baton Rouge, Louisiana
G	15	Terrence Rencher	6 ft 3 in (1.91 m)	180 lb (82 kg)	Sr	The Bronx, New York
G	32	Reggie Freeman	6 ft 6 in (1.98 m)	215 lb (98 kg)	So	The Bronx, New York

Head coach

- Tom Penders (Connecticut)

Assistant coach(es)

Legend

- (C) Team captain
- (S) Suspended
- (I) Ineligible
- (W) Walk-on
- Injured
- Current redshirt

== Schedule and results ==
Date time, TV	Rank^{#}	Opponent^{#}	Result	Record	Site (attendance) city, state
Non-conference regular season
Nov 26, 1994*		at No. 2 North Carolina	L 92–96	0–1	Dean Smith Center; Chapel Hill, North Carolina
Nov 29, 1994*		Lamar	W 97–54	1–1	Frank Erwin Center; Austin, Texas
Dec 7, 1994*		Texas State	W 105–60	2–1	Frank Erwin Center; Austin, Texas
Dec 10, 1994*		at No. 6 Florida	L 73–91	2–2	O'Connell Center; Gainesville, Florida
Dec 20, 1994*		Stephen F. Austin	W 95–94	3–2	Frank Erwin Center; Austin, Texas
Dec 27, 1994*		vs. Texas-Rio Grande Valley	W 84–73	4–2	Special Events Center; El Paso, Texas
Dec 28, 1994*		vs. Washington State	W 86–81	5–2	Special Events Center; El Paso, Texas
Jan 4, 1995*		No. 19 Nebraska	W 102–74	6–2	Frank Erwin Center; Austin, Texas
Jan 7, 1995*		LSU	W 80–71	7–2	Frank Erwin Center; Austin, Texas
SWC Regular season
Jan 10, 1995		at TCU	L 98–102	7–3 (0–1)	Daniel-Meyer Coliseum; Fort Worth, Texas
Jan 21, 1995*		at Oklahoma	L 75–100	9–4	Lloyd Noble Center; Norman, Oklahoma
Jan 26, 1995*		DePaul	W 99–92	11–4	Frank Erwin Center; Austin, Texas
Feb 19, 1995*		vs. Temple	W 70–54	17–5	Alamodome; San Antonio, Texas
Mar 4, 1995		at Rice	W 108–74	20–6 (11–3)	Rice Gymnasium; Houston, Texas
Southwest Conference tournament
Mar 10, 1995*		vs. Rice; Semifinals	W 78–75	21–6	Reunion Arena; Dallas, Texas
Mar 11, 1995*		vs. Texas Tech; Championship game	W 107–104 ^{OT}	22–6	Reunion Arena; Dallas, Texas
NCAA tournament
Mar 16, 1995*	(11 W)	vs. (6 W) Oregon; First round	W 90–73	23–6	Jon M. Huntsman Center; Salt Lake City, Utah
Mar 18, 1995*	(11 W)	vs. (3 W) No. 10 Maryland; Second round	L 68–82	23–7	Jon M. Huntsman Center; Salt Lake City, Utah
*Non-conference game. ^{#}Rankings from AP poll. (#) Tournament seedings in parentheses. MW=Midwest. All times are in Central Standard Time.
