= 1994–95 Michigan State Spartans men's basketball team =

American college basketball season

1994–95 Michigan State Spartans men's basketball

Oldsmobile Spartan Classic champions

NCAA tournament, first round
- Conference: Big Ten Conference

Ranking
- Coaches: No. 20
- AP: No. 11
- Record: 22–6 (14–4 Big Ten)
- Head coach: Jud Heathcote (19th season)
- Assistant coaches: Tom Izzo; Stan Joplin; Brian Gregory
- Captains: Eric Snow; Shawn Respert
- Home arena: Breslin Center

1994–95 Big Ten Conference men's basketball standings
	Conf.				Overall
Team	W		L	PCT	W		L	PCT
No. 12 Purdue	15	–	3	.833	25	–	7	.781
No. 11 Michigan State	14	–	4	.778	22	–	6	.786
Indiana	11	–	7	.611	19	–	12	.613
Michigan	11	–	7	.611	17	–	14	.548
Illinois	10	–	8	.556	19	–	12	.613
Minnesota	10	–	8	.556	20	–	11	.645
Penn State	9	–	9	.500	21	–	11	.656
Iowa	9	–	9	.500	21	–	12	.636
Wisconsin	7	–	11	.389	13	–	14	.481
Ohio State	2	–	16	.111	6	–	22	.214
Northwestern	1	–	17	.056	5	–	22	.185
Rankings from AP Poll; *Minnesota 1 NCAA Tourn. game vacated due to sanctions against the program; 1 Win by forfeit (non-conf.); Disputed record (19-12)

The 1994–95 Michigan State Spartans men's basketball team represented Michigan State University in the 1994–95 NCAA Division I men's basketball season. The team played their home games at Breslin Center in East Lansing, Michigan and were members of the Big Ten Conference. They were coached by Jud Heathcote in his 19th and final season at Michigan State. The Spartans finished the season with a record of 22–6, 14–4 in Big Ten play to finish in second place, one game behind Purdue. They received an at-large bid to the NCAA tournament as the No. 3 seed in the Southeast region, where they were upset by 14th-seeded Weber State in the First Round.

The game marked the final game of Heathcote's coaching tenure at MSU. Longtime assistant coach Tom Izzo took over as the head coach the following year.

== Previous season ==
The Spartans finished the 1993–94 season with an overall record of 20–12, 10–8 in Big Ten play to finish in fourth place. Michigan State received an at-large bid as a No. 7 seed to the NCAA tournament. There they defeated Seton Hall before losing to Duke in the Second Round.

== Season ==
The Spartans were led by All-American Shawn Respert, who averaged 25.6 points per game.

The Spartans began their season ranked No. 18 in the country and on the road, avenging a prior loss to UIC a few years prior. A win over Louisville preceded a trip to future Big Ten foe Nebraska. In a high scoring game, the Spartans were outscored 96–91. MSU went on to win their next seven games including their first two conference games, wins over Wisconsin and No. 22-ranked Iowa moving the Spartans to No. 14 in the country. A loss at Indiana led to another seven-games winning streak, including wins over non-conference foe Oklahoma State and rival Michigan pushing MSU to a No. 7 ranking.. A home loss to No. 25 Purdue and No. 24 Minnesota in two of their next four games dropped MSU out of the top ten rankings, slipping to 12th. The Spartans would rally to win four of their final five games to finish the regular season ranked No. 11 and one game behind conference champions Purdue.

The Spartans received an at-large bid to the NCAA Tournament as the No. 3 seed in the Southeast region. The Spartans overlooked No. 14 seed Weber State in the First Round and were stunned 79–72. MSU led by nine at the half against the Wildcats, but were outscored by 16 in the second half.

== Roster and statistics ==
1994–95 Michigan State Spartans men's basketball team
Name	Class	Pos	Height	Summary
Damion Beathea	JR	F	6'7"	5.0 Pts, 3.5 Reb, 1.0 Ast
Quinton Brooks	JR	F	6'7"	11.3 Pts, 5.2 Reb, 0.9 Ast
Jamie Feick	JR	C	6'9"	9.9 Pts, 10.0 Reb, 1.0 Ast
Jon Garavaglia	SO	F	6'9"	7.6 Pts, 5.1 Reb, 0.6 Ast
David Hart	JR	G	6'4"	0.5 Pts, 0.8 Reb, 0.3 Ast
Thomas Kelley	FR	G	6'2"	1.4 Pts, 0.5 Reb, 0.5 Ast
Steve Nicodemus	JR	G	6'4"	1.2 Pts, 0.5 Reb, 0.2 Ast
Andy Penick	SR	G	6'2"	1.6 Pts, 0.2 Reb, 0.5 Ast
Steve Polonowski	SO	F	6'9"	2.2 Pts, 1.4 Reb, 0.6 Ast
Mark Prylow	SR	G	6'3"	0.8 Pts, 0.5 Reb, 0.3 Ast
Mike Respert	SO	G	5'11"	1.3 Pts, 0.1 Reb, 0.3 Ast
Shawn Respert	SR	G	6'1"	25.6 Pts, 4.0 Reb, 3.0 Ast
Eric Snow	SR	G	6'3"	10.8 Pts, 3.3 Reb, 7.8 Ast
Ray Weathers	SO	G	6'3"	3.5 Pts, 2.0 Reb, 0.7 Ast

== Schedule and results ==
Date time, TV	Rank^{#}	Opponent^{#}	Result	Record	Site city, state
Regular season
Nov 30, 1994*	No. 18	at UIC	W 92–78	1–0	UIC Pavilion; Chicago, IL
Dec 3, 1994*	No. 18	Louisville	W 85–71	2–0	Breslin Center; East Lansing, MI
Dec 10, 1994*	No. 15	at Nebraska	L 91–96	2–1	Bob Devaney Sports Center; Lincoln, NE
Dec 12, 1994*	No. 18	Cleveland State	W 111–68	3–1	Breslin Center; East Lansing, MI
Dec 17, 1994*	No. 18	at Detroit Mercy	W 80–63	4–1	Calihan Hall; Detroit, MI
Dec 20, 1994*	No. 17	Tennessee	W 78–68	5–1	Breslin Center; East Lansing, MI
Dec 29, 1994*	No. 15	Ball State; Oldsmobile Spartan Classic semifinals	W 117–95	6–1	Breslin Center; East Lansing, MI
Dec 30 1994*	No. 15	Long Beach State; Oldsmobile Spartan Classic championship	W 67–64	7–1	Breslin Center; East Lansing, MI
Jan 4, 1995	No. 14	at Wisconsin	W 78–64	8–1 (1–0)	Wisconsin Field House; Madison, WI
Jan 7, 1995	No. 14	No. 22 Iowa	W 69–68	9–1 (2–0)	Breslin Center; East Lansing, MI
Jan 11, 1995	No. 11	at Indiana	L 82–89	9–2 (2–1)	Assembly Hall; Bloomington, IN
Jan 14, 1995*	No. 11	Oklahoma State	W 70–69	10–2	Breslin Center; East Lansing, MI
Jan 18, 1995	No. 12	Northwestern	W 93–56	11–2 (3–1)	Breslin Center; East Lansing, MI
Jan 22, 1995	No. 12	at Michigan; Rivalry	W 73–71	12–2 (4–1)	Crisler Arena; Ann Arbor, MI
Jan 25, 1995	No. 10	Minnesota	W 54–53	13–2 (5–1)	Breslin Center; East Lansing, MI
Jan 28, 1995	No. 10	at Illinois	W 75–67	14–2 (6–1)	Assembly Hall; Champaign, IL
Feb 2, 1995	No. 9	Penn State	W 82–62	15–2 (7–1)	Breslin Center; East Lansing, MI
Feb 4, 1995	No. 9	at Ohio State	W 67–58	16–2 (8–1)	St. John Arena; Columbus, OH
Feb 7, 1995	No. 7	No. 25 Purdue	L 69–78	16–3 (8–2)	Breslin Center; East Lansing, MI
Feb 11, 1995	No. 7	Penn State	W 68–53	17–3 (9–2)	Breslin Center; East Lansing, MI
Feb 15, 1995	No. 8	Illinois	W 68–58	18–3 (10–2)	Breslin Center; East Lansing, MI
Feb 18, 1995	No. 8	at No. 24 Minnesota	L 57–66	18–4 (10–3)	Williams Arena; Minneapolis, MN
Feb 21, 1995	No. 12	Michigan; Rivalry	W 67–64	19–4 (11–3)	Breslin Center; East Lansing, MI
Feb 25, 1995	No. 12	at Northwestern	W 88–60	20–4 (12–3)	Welsh-Ryan Arena; Evanston, IL
Mar 5, 1995	No. 10	Indiana	W 67–61	21–4 (13–3)	Breslin Center; East Lansing, MI
Mar 8, 1995	No. 9	at Iowa	L 78–79	21–5 (13–4)	Carver-Hawkeye Arena; Iowa City, IA
Mar 11, 1995	No. 9	Wisconsin	W 97–72	22–5 (14–4)	Breslin Center; East Lansing, MI
NCAA tournament
Mar 17, 1995*	(3 SE) No. 11	(14 SE) Weber State; First Round	L 72–79	22–6	Donald L. Tucker Center; Tallahassee, FL
*Non-conference game. ^{#}Rankings from AP Poll,. (#) Tournament seedings in parentheses. All times are in Central Time; Source.

== Rankings ==
Ranking movement Legend: ██ Increase in ranking. ██ Decrease in ranking. (RV) Received votes but unranked. (NR) Not ranked.
Poll	Pre	Wk 2	Wk 3	Wk 4	Wk 5	Wk 6	Wk 7	Wk 8	Wk 9	Wk 10	Wk 11	Wk 12	Wk 13	Wk 14	Wk 15	Wk 16	Wk 17	Wk 18
AP	20	17	18	15	18	17	15	14	11	12	10	9	7	8	12	10	9	11

Source.

== Awards and honors ==
- Shawn Respert – All-Big Ten First Team
