= 1994–95 Iowa Hawkeyes men's basketball team =

American college basketball season

1994–95 Iowa Hawkeyes men's basketball

Hawkeye Invitational champion

National Invitation Tournament
- Conference: Big Ten Conference
- Record: 21–12 (9–9 Big Ten)
- Head coach: Tom Davis (9th season)
- Assistant coach: Gary Close
- MVPs: Jess Settles; Andre Woolridge
- Home arena: Carver–Hawkeye Arena

1994–95 Big Ten Conference men's basketball standings
	Conf.				Overall
Team	W		L	PCT	W		L	PCT
No. 12 Purdue	15	–	3	.833	25	–	7	.781
No. 11 Michigan State	14	–	4	.778	22	–	6	.786
Indiana	11	–	7	.611	19	–	12	.613
Michigan	11	–	7	.611	17	–	14	.548
Illinois	10	–	8	.556	19	–	12	.613
Minnesota	10	–	8	.556	20	–	11	.645
Penn State	9	–	9	.500	21	–	11	.656
Iowa	9	–	9	.500	21	–	12	.636
Wisconsin	7	–	11	.389	13	–	14	.481
Ohio State	2	–	16	.111	6	–	22	.214
Northwestern	1	–	17	.056	5	–	22	.185
Rankings from AP Poll; *Minnesota 1 NCAA Tourn. game vacated due to sanctions against the program; 1 Win by forfeit (non-conf.); Disputed record (19-12)

The 1994–95 Iowa Hawkeyes men's basketball team represented the University of Iowa as members of the Big Ten Conference during the 1994–95 NCAA Division I men's basketball season. The team was led by head coach ninth-year head coach Tom Davis, and played their home games at Carver-Hawkeye Arena. They finished the season 21–12 overall and 9–9 in Big Ten play.

== Roster ==
1994–95 Iowa Hawkeyes men's basketball team
Players
Coaches

Pos.	#	Name	Height	Weight	Year	Hometown
G	3	Kenyon Murray	6 ft 5 in (1.96 m)	—	Jr	Battle Creek, Michigan
F	4	Jess Settles	6 ft 7 in (2.01 m)	—	So	Winfield, Iowa
G	11	Kevin Skillet	6 ft 3 in (1.91 m)	180 lb (82 kg)	Sr	Silvis, Illinois
PG	15	Andre Woolridge	6 ft 0 in (1.83 m)	190 lb (86 kg)	So	Omaha, Nebraska
G	13	Mon'ter Glasper	5 ft 11 in (1.8 m)	—	So	Albion, Michigan
G	14	Chris Kingsbury	6 ft 5 in (1.96 m)	—	Fr	Hamilton, Ohio
PF	42	Ryan Bowen	6 ft 9 in (2.06 m)	—	Fr	Fort Madison, Iowa
G	45	Darryl Moore	6 ft 2 in (1.88 m)	—	Fr	Chicago, Illinois
F/C	52	Russ Millard	6 ft 8 in (2.03 m)	—	Jr	Cedar Rapids, Iowa
C	55	Greg Helmers	6 ft 10 in (2.08 m)	—	Fr	Palmer, Iowa

Head coach

- Tom Davis (UW–Platteville)

Assistant coach(es)

- Gary Close

Legend

- (C) Team captain
- (S) Suspended
- (I) Ineligible
- (W) Walk-on
- Injured
- Current redshirt

== Schedule/Results ==
Date time, TV	Rank^{#}	Opponent^{#}	Result	Record	Site city, state
Non-conference regular season
11/25/1994*		Morgan State	W 126–79	1–0	Carver-Hawkeye Arena; Iowa City, IA
11/29/1994*		at Drake; Iowa "Big Four"	W 103–68	2–0	Knapp Center; Des Moines, IA
12/2/1994*		Pepperdine; Hawkeye Invitational	W 99–63	3–0	Carver-Hawkeye Arena; Iowa City, IA
12/3/1994*		No. 14 Ohio; Hawkeye Invitational	W 91–75	4–0	Carver-Hawkeye Arena (14,563); Iowa City, IA
12/7/1994*		Northern Iowa; Iowa "Big Four"	W 80–48	5–0	Carver-Hawkeye Arena; Iowa City, IA
12/10/1994*		Iowa State; Rivalry	L 63–76	5–1	Carver-Hawkeye Arena (15,500); Iowa City, IA
Dec 17, 1994*		Long Island University	W 102–72	6–1	Carver-Hawkeye Arena; Iowa City, IA
Dec 20, 1994*		Western Carolina	W 85–60	7–1	Carver-Hawkeye Arena; Iowa City, IA
Dec 23, 1994		at BYU-Hawaii	W 61–57	8–1	CAC; Laie, Hawaii
12/28/1994*		vs. No. 7 Duke; Rainbow Classic	W 81–71	9–1	Stan Sheriff Center; Honolulu, HI
12/29/1994*		at Hawaii; Rainbow Classic	W 84–82	10–1	Stan Sheriff Center; Honolulu, HI
12/30/1994*		vs. No. 3 Arkansas; Rainbow Classic	L 92–101	10–2	Stan Sheriff Center; Honolulu, HI
Big Ten Regular Season
1/3/1995	No. 22	No. 21 Indiana	W 74–55	11–2 (1–0)	Carver-Hawkeye Arena; Iowa City, IA
Jan 7, 1995	No. 22	at No. 14 Michigan State	L 68–69	11–3 (1–1)	Breslin Student Events Center; East Lansing, MI
Jan 11, 1995	No. 19	at Michigan	L 82–83	11–4 (1–2)	Crisler Arena; Ann Arbor, MI
Jan 14, 1995	No. 19	Purdue	L 83–84	11–5 (1–3)	Carver-Hawkeye Arena; Iowa City, IA
Jan 21, 1995		Wisconsin	W 96–84	12–5 (2–3)	Carver-Hawkeye Arena; Iowa City, IA
Jan 25, 1995		at Ohio State	W 81–66	13–5 (3–3)	St. John Arena; Columbus, Ohio
Jan 28, 1995*		Minnesota	L 54–55	13–6 (3–4)	Carver-Hawkeye Arena; Iowa City, IA
Feb 1, 1995*		Illinois; Rivalry	L 74–79	13–7 (3–5)	Carver-Hawkeye Arena; Iowa City, IA
Feb 4, 1995		at Penn State	L 64–74	13–8 (3–6)	Rec Hall; University Park, PA
Feb 8, 1995*		Northwestern	W 116–77	14–8 (4–6)	Carver-Hawkeye Arena; Iowa City, IA
Feb 11, 1995		at Illinois	L 97–104	14–9 (4–7)	Assembly Hall; Champaign, IL
Feb 15, 1995		at No. 24 Minnesota	W 74–70	15–9 (5–7)	Williams Arena; Minneapolis, MN
Feb 18, 1995		Ohio State	W 85–66	16–9 (6–7)	Carver-Hawkeye Arena; Iowa City, IA
Feb 22, 1995		at Wisconsin	W 84–77	17–9 (7–7)	Wisconsin Field House; Madison, WI
Mar 1, 1995		at No. 17 Purdue	L 85–92	17–10 (7–8)	Mackey Arena; West Lafayette, IN
Mar 5, 1995		Michigan	W 89–69	18–10 (8–8)	Carver-Hawkeye Arena; Iowa City, IA
3/8/1995		No. 9 Michigan State	W 79–78	19–10 (9–8)	Carver-Hawkeye Arena; Iowa City, IA
Mar 12, 1995		at Indiana	L 79–110	19–11 (9–9)	Assembly Hall; Bloomington, IN
National Invitation Tournament
3/15/1995*		vs. DePaul	W 96–87	20–11	iWireless Center; Moline, IL
3/21/1995*		Ohio	W 66–62	21–11	Carver-Hawkeye Arena; Iowa City, IA
3/23/1995*		Penn State	L 64–67	21–12	Carver-Hawkeye Arena; Iowa City, IA
*Non-conference game. ^{#}Rankings from AP Poll. (#) Tournament seedings in parentheses.
