= 1994–95 Illinois Fighting Illini men's basketball team =

American college basketball season

1994–95 Illinois Fighting Illini men's basketball

San Juan Shootout, Champion Illini Classic, Champion

NCAA men's Division I tournament, first round
- Conference: Big Ten Conference
- Record: 19–12 (10–8 Big Ten)
- Head coach: Lou Henson (20th season)
- Assistant coaches: Dick Nagy (16th season); Jimmy Collins (12th season); Mark Bial (1st season)
- MVP: Kiwane Garris
- Captains: Robert Bennett; Shelly Clark
- Home arena: Assembly Hall

1994–95 Big Ten Conference men's basketball standings
	Conf.				Overall
Team	W		L	PCT	W		L	PCT
No. 12 Purdue	15	–	3	.833	25	–	7	.781
No. 11 Michigan State	14	–	4	.778	22	–	6	.786
Indiana	11	–	7	.611	19	–	12	.613
Michigan	11	–	7	.611	17	–	14	.548
Illinois	10	–	8	.556	19	–	12	.613
Minnesota	10	–	8	.556	20	–	11	.645
Penn State	9	–	9	.500	21	–	11	.656
Iowa	9	–	9	.500	21	–	12	.636
Wisconsin	7	–	11	.389	13	–	14	.481
Ohio State	2	–	16	.111	6	–	22	.214
Northwestern	1	–	17	.056	5	–	22	.185
Rankings from AP Poll; *Minnesota 1 NCAA Tourn. game vacated due to sanctions against the program; 1 Win by forfeit (non-conf.); Disputed record (19-12)

The 1994–95 Illinois Fighting Illini men's basketball team represented the University of Illinois.

== Regular season ==
=== Roster ===
1994–95 Illinois Fighting Illini men's basketball team
Players
Coaches

Pos.	#	Name	Height	Weight	Year	Previous school	Hometown
G	12	Derrick Thomas (W)	—	—	Fr	Rich Central High School	Country Club Hills, Illinois
G	21	Matt Heldman	6 ft 0 in (1.83 m)	160 lb (73 kg)	Fr	Libertyville High School	Libertyville, Illinois
G	22	Kiwane Garris	6 ft 2 in (1.88 m)	180 lb (82 kg)	So	Westinghouse High School	Chicago, Illinois
G	24	Richard Keene	6 ft 6 in (1.98 m)	210 lb (95 kg)	Jr	Collinsville High School	Collinsville, Illinois
G	25	Bryant Notree	6 ft 4 in (1.93 m)	200 lb (91 kg)	Fr	Simeon High School	Chicago, Illinois
F	30	Robert Bennett (C)	6 ft 6 in (1.98 m)	200 lb (91 kg)	Sr	Julian High School	Chicago, Illinois
C	31	Brett Robisch	6 ft 11 in (2.11 m)	225 lb (102 kg)	RS Fr	Calvary Academy	Springfield, Illinois
F	32	Jerry Gee	6 ft 7 in (2.01 m)	230 lb (104 kg)	Fr	St. Martin de Porres High School	Chicago, Illinois
G	33	Kevin Turner	6 ft 2 in (1.88 m)	160 lb (73 kg)	Fr	Simeon High School	Chicago, Illinois
F	34	Brian Johnson	6 ft 6 in (1.98 m)	195 lb (88 kg)	RS Fr	Maine West High School	Des Plaines, Illinois
F/C	35	Shelly Clark (C)	6 ft 9 in (2.06 m)	260 lb (118 kg)	Jr	South Shore High School	Chicago, Illinois
F	40	Jerry Hester	6 ft 6 in (1.98 m)	195 lb (88 kg)	So	Manual High School	Peoria, Illinois
F	45	Chris Gandy	6 ft 9 in (2.06 m)	205 lb (93 kg)	RS So	Bradley-Bourbonnais High School	Kankakee, Illinois
C	52	Steve Roth	6 ft 10 in (2.08 m)	250 lb (113 kg)	Sr	East High School	Belleville, Illinois

Head coach

- Lou Henson (New Mexico A&M) (20th year)

Assistant coach(es)

- Dick Nagy (New Mexico State University) (16th year)
- Jimmy Collins (New Mexico State University) (12th year)
- Mark Bial (University of Illinois) (1st year)

Legend

- (C) Team captain
- (S) Suspended
- (I) Ineligible
- (W) Walk-on
- Injured
- Current redshirt

Roster

== Schedule ==
Date time, TV	Rank^{#}	Opponent^{#}	Result	Record	Site (attendance) city, state
Non-Conference regular season
11/25/1994*		vs. American-Puerto Rico; San Juan Shootout	W 89-77	1-0	Roberto Clemente Coliseum (1,000); San Juan, PR
11/26/1994*		vs. College of Charleston; San Juan Shootout	W 66-57	2-0	Roberto Clemente Coliseum (500); San Juan, PR
11/27/1994*		vs. Virginia Tech; San Juan Shootout	W 85-75	3-0	Roberto Clemente Coliseum (500); San Juan, PR
12/3/1994*		vs. No. 6 Duke	L 65-70	3-1	United Center (21,500); Chicago, IL
12/5/1994*		at Kansas State	W 76-69	4-1	Bramlage Coliseum (8,643); Manhattan, KS
12/9/1994*		Northeastern Illinois; Illini Classic	W 71-53	5-1	Assembly Hall (15,084); Champaign, IL
12/10/1994*		Princeton; Illini Classic	W 59-37	6-1	Assembly Hall (14,943); Champaign, IL
12/17/1994*		Illinois-Chicago	W 75-60	7-1	Assembly Hall (15,696); Champaign, IL
12/19/1994*	No. 23	Mercer	W 90-66	8-1	Assembly Hall (14,182); Champaign, IL
12/22/1994*	No. 23	vs. Missouri; Braggin' Rights	L 58-76	8-2	Scottrade Center (21,714); St. Louis, MO
12/27/1994*		at No. 8 Connecticut	L 56-71	8-3	Hartford Civic Center (16,294); Hartford, CT
12/29/1994*		Memphis	W 86-76	9-3	Assembly Hall (16,313); Champaign, IL
Big Ten regular season
1/4/1995		Ohio State	W 79-70	10-3 (1-0)	Assembly Hall (15,813); Champaign, IL
1/7/1995		at Northwestern; Rivalry	W 82-55	11-3 (2-0)	Welsh-Ryan Arena (8,117); Evanston, IL
1/10/1995		at Purdue	W 62-58	12-3 (3-0)	Mackey Arena (14,123); West Lafayette, IN
1/14/1995		Indiana; Rivalry	W 78-67	13-3 (4-0)	Assembly Hall (16,450); Champaign, IL
1/17/1995	No. 20	Michigan	L 59-69	13-4 (4-1)	Assembly Hall (16,450); Champaign, IL
1/21/1995	No. 20	at Minnesota	L 66-77	13-5 (4-2)	Williams Arena (14,527); Minneapolis, MN
1/28/1995		No. 10 Michigan State	W 72-64	13-6 (4-3)	Assembly Hall (16,450); Champaign, IL
2/1/1995		at Iowa; Rivalry	W 79-74	14-6 (5-3)	Carver–Hawkeye Arena (15,500); Iowa City, IA
2/4/1995		at Wisconsin	L 60-73	14-7 (5-4)	Wisconsin Field House (11,500); Madison, WI
2/8/1995		Penn State	W 67-58	15-7 (6-4)	Assembly Hall (16,090); Champaign, IL
2/11/1995		Iowa; Rivalry	W 104-97 ^{ot}	16-7 (7-4)	Assembly Hall (16,450); Champaign, IL
2/15/1995		at No. 8 Michigan State	L 58-68	16-8 (7-5)	Breslin Student Events Center (15,138); East Lansing, MI
2/22/1995	No. 20	No. 22 Minnesota	W 94-88 ^{ot}	17-8 (8-5)	Assembly Hall (16,206); Champaign, IL
2/26/1995		at Michigan	L 51-63	17-9 (8-6)	Crisler Arena (13,562); Ann Arbor, MI
3/2/1995		at Indiana; Rivalry	L 85-89	17-10 (8-7)	Assembly Hall (17,101); Bloomington, IN
3/4/1995		No. 17 Purdue	L 56-69	17-11 (8-8)	Assembly Hall (14,123); Champaign, IL
3/8/1995		Northwestern; Rivalry	W 99-57	18-11 (9-8)	Assembly Hall (15,195); Champaign, IL
3/11/1995		at Ohio State	W 82-63	19-11 (10-8)	St. John Arena (11,216); Columbus, OH
NCAA tournament
3/17/1995*	(11 E)	vs. (6 E) Tulsa; First Round	L 62-68	19-12	Knickerbocker Arena (15,100); Albany, NY
*Non-conference game. ^{#}Rankings from AP Poll. (#) Tournament seedings in parentheses. All times are in Central Time.

== Player stats ==
Player	Games Played	2 pt. Field Goals	3 pt. Field Goals	Free Throws	Rebounds	Assists	Blocks	Steals	Points
Kiwane Garris	31	104	46	148	88	117	0	36	494
Richard Keene	31	60	63	29	119	111	4	30	338
Shelly Clark	28	131	0	67	233	43	11	28	329
Jerry Hester	30	81	38	47	145	57	10	23	323
Robert Bennett	31	98	0	66	191	15	13	22	262
Jarrod Gee	31	73	0	39	106	7	7	12	185
Bryant Notree	31	34	2	8	66	15	2	7	82
Kevin Turner	26	12	14	7	20	17	0	2	73
Chris Gandy	23	30	2	6	51	1	3	2	72
Brian Johnson	24	16	1	15	23	10	3	7	50
Brett Robisch	18	9	1	2	12	0	1	1	23
Matt Heldman	21	3	0	12	12	4	0	3	18
Steve Roth	15	4	0	1	15	0	0	0	9
Derrick Thomas	14	1	0	5	5	0	0	1	7

== Awards and honors ==
- Kiwane Garris
  - Team Most Valuable Player

== Team players drafted into the NBA ==
Player	NBA Club	Round	Pick
