= Kenny Sykes =

American high school basketball coach (born 1973)

Personal information
- Born: 1973 (age 52–53)
- Listed height: 6 ft 4 in (1.93 m)
- Listed weight: 193 lb (88 kg)

Career information
- College: Junior college (1991–1992); Grambling State (1992–1995)
- NBA draft: 1995: undrafted
- Position: Shooting guard

Career highlights
- SWAC Player of the Year (1995); First-team All-SWAC (1995); 2× Second-team All-SWAC (1993, 1994); SWAC Newcomer of the Year (1993)

Kenny Sykes (born 1973) is an American high school basketball coach who is best known for his collegiate career at Grambling State University between 1992 and 1995. Sykes, a 6'4" shooting guard, was the Southwestern Athletic Conference (SWAC) Newcomer of the Year and a second team all-conference selection as a sophomore in 1992–93. He averaged 23.9 points, 5 rebounds, 3.4 assists and 2.1 steals per game that year. In Sykes' junior season he was once again named to the all-conference second team, this time behind averages of 21 points, 3.8 rebounds, 3.1 assists and 1.8 steals. In 1994–95, his senior year, Sykes averaged a conference-leading 26.3 points per game as well as 4.1 rebounds and 3.1 assists. He was named the SWAC Player of the Year, becoming just the second player from Grambling State to earn the honor.

Sykes was selected in the 1995 Continental Basketball Association draft by the Yakima Sun Kings in the third round (42nd overall). He played in the United States Basketball League for the Florida Sea Dragons, but his semi-professional career was short-lived. Sykes eventually became an assistant men's basketball coach at Grambling State and was the interim head coach for a brief time after the 2007–08 season ended when Larry Wright was fired. Today he serves as a high school coach at Woodlawn High School in Shreveport, Louisiana.
