= 1994–95 Indiana Hoosiers men's basketball team =

American college basketball season

1994–95 Indiana Hoosiers men's basketball

NCAA men's Division I tournament, Round of 64
- Conference: Big Ten Conference
- Record: 19–12 (11–7 Big Ten)
- Head coach: Bobby Knight (24th season)
- Captains: Alan Henderson; Pat Knight
- Home arena: Assembly Hall

1994–95 Big Ten Conference men's basketball standings
| | Conf. | | | | Overall |
| Team | W | | L | PCT | W | | L | PCT |
|---|---|---|---|---|---|---|---|---|
| No. 12 Purdue | 15 | – | 3 | .833 | 25 | – | 7 | .781 |
| No. 11 Michigan State | 14 | – | 4 | .778 | 22 | – | 6 | .786 |
| Indiana | 11 | – | 7 | .611 | 19 | – | 12 | .613 |
| Michigan | 11 | – | 7 | .611 | 17 | – | 14 | .548 |
| Illinois | 10 | – | 8 | .556 | 19 | – | 12 | .613 |
| Minnesota | 10 | – | 8 | .556 | 20 | – | 11 | .645 |
| Penn State | 9 | – | 9 | .500 | 21 | – | 11 | .656 |
| Iowa | 9 | – | 9 | .500 | 21 | – | 12 | .636 |
| Wisconsin | 7 | – | 11 | .389 | 13 | – | 14 | .481 |
| Ohio State | 2 | – | 16 | .111 | 6 | – | 22 | .214 |
| Northwestern | 1 | – | 17 | .056 | 5 | – | 22 | .185 |
Rankings from AP Poll; *Minnesota 1 NCAA Tourn. game vacated due to sanctions against the program; 1 Win by forfeit (non-conf.); Disputed record (19-12)

The 1994–95 Indiana Hoosiers men's basketball team represented Indiana University. Their head coach was Bobby Knight, who was in his 24th year. The team played its home games in Assembly Hall in Bloomington, Indiana, and was a member of the Big Ten Conference.

The Hoosiers finished the regular season with an overall record of 19–12 and a conference record of 11–7, finishing 3rd in the Big Ten Conference. The Hoosiers were invited to participate in the 1995 NCAA tournament. However, IU made a quick exit with a 65–60 loss in the first round to Missouri.

== Roster ==
| No. | Name | Position | Ht. | Year | Hometown |
|---|---|---|---|---|---|
| 3 | Charlie Miller | F | 6–7 | Fr. | Miami, Florida |
| 5 | Neil Reed | G | 6–2 | Fr. | Metairie, Louisiana |
| 20 | Sherron Wilkerson | G | 6–4 | RS So. | Jeffersonville, Indiana |
| 21 | Richard Mandeville | C | 7–1 | RS So. | Pasadena, California |
| 22 | Jean Paul | G | 6–2 | Fr. | Naples, Florida |
| 23 | Steve Hart | G | 6–3 | So. | Terre Haute, Indiana |
| 25 | Pat Knight | G | 6–6 | Sr. | Bloomington, Indiana |
| 30 | Michael Hermon | G | 6–3 | Fr. | Chicago, Illinois |
| 32 | Robbie Eggers | F | 6–10 | Fr. | Cuyahoga Falls, Ohio |
| 33 | Rob Hodgson | F | 6–7 | Fr. | Mastic Beach, New York |
| 34 | Brian Evans | F | 6–8 | Jr. | Terre Haute, Indiana |
| 44 | Alan Henderson | F | 6–9 | Sr. | Indianapolis, Indiana |
| 45 | Andrae Patterson | F | 6–8 | Fr. | Abilene, Texas |
| 50 | Todd Lindeman | C | 7–1 | Jr. | Channing, Michigan |

== Schedule/Results ==
| Date time, TV | Rank^{#} | Opponent^{#} | Result | Record | Site city, state |
Regular Season
| 11/21/1994* | No. 11 | vs. Utah; Maui Invitational Tournament; Quarterfinals | L 72–77 | 0–1 | Lahaina Civic Center; Lahaina, HI |
| 11/22/1994* | No. 11 | vs. Chaminade; Maui Invitational Tournament; Consolation Second Round | W 92–79 | 1–1 | Lahaina Civic Center; Lahaina, HI |
| 11/23/1994* | No. 11 | vs. Tulane; Maui Invitational Tournament; Fifth Place Game | L 68–86 | 1–2 | Lahaina Civic Center; Lahaina, HI |
| 11/29/1994* | | at Notre Dame | L 79–80 | 1–3 | Joyce Center; Notre Dame, IN |
| 12/3/1994* | | vs. Evansville | W 84–63 | 2–3 | RCA Dome; Indianapolis, IN |
| 12/7/1994* | | vs. No. 7 Kentucky; Indiana–Kentucky rivalry | L 70–73 | 2–4 | Freedom Hall; Louisville, KY |
| 12/9/1994* | | Morehead State; Indiana Classic | W 79–62 | 3–4 | Assembly Hall; Bloomington, IN |
| 12/10/1994* | | Miami (OH); Indiana Classic | W 92–77 | 4–4 | Assembly Hall; Bloomington, IN |
| 12/17/1994* | | No. 3 Kansas | W 80–61 | 5–4 | Assembly Hall; Bloomington, IN |
| 12/21/1994* | | Butler | W 89–66 | 6–4 | Assembly Hall; Bloomington, IN |
| 12/28/1994* | No. 24 | vs. Eastern Kentucky; Union Federal Hoosier Classic | W 92–49 | 7–4 | Market Square Arena; Indianapolis, IN |
| 12/29/1994* | No. 24 | vs. Arkansas-Little Rock; Union Federal Hoosier Classic | W 77–53 | 8–4 | Market Square Arena; Indianapolis, IN |
| 1/3/1995 | No. 21 | at No. 22 Iowa | L 55–74 | 8–5 (0–1) | Carver-Hawkeye Arena; Iowa City, IA |
| 1/7/1995 | No. 21 | Wisconsin | W 73–70 | 9–5 (1–1) | Assembly Hall; Bloomington, IN |
| 1/11/1995 | | Michigan State | W 89–82 | 10–5 (2–1) | Assembly Hall; Bloomington, IN |
| 1/14/1995 | | at Illinois; Rivalry | L 67–78 | 10–6 (2–2) | Assembly Hall; Champaign, IL |
| 1/18/1995 | | at Penn State | W 71–69 | 11–6 (3–2) | Rec Hall; University Park, PA |
| 1/24/1995 | | Michigan | L 52–65 | 11–7 (3–3) | Assembly Hall; Bloomington, IN |
| 1/28/1995 | | Ohio State | W 90–75 | 12–7 (4–3) | Assembly Hall; Bloomington, IN |
| 1/31/1995 | | at Purdue; Rivalry | L 66–76 | 12–8 (4–4) | Mackey Arena; West Lafayette, IN |
| 2/4/1995 | | at Northwestern | W 88–67 | 13–8 (5–4) | Welsh-Ryan Arena; Evanston, IL |
| 2/8/1995 | | Minnesota | L 54–64 | 13–9 (5–5) | Assembly Hall; Bloomington, IN |
| 2/12/1995 | | Purdue; Rivalry | W 82–73 | 14–9 (6–5) | Assembly Hall; Bloomington, IN |
| 2/14/1995 | | at Ohio State | W 69–52 | 15–9 (7–5) | St. John Arena; Columbus, OH |
| 2/19/1995 | | at Michigan | L 50–61 | 15–10 (7–6) | Crisler Arena; Ann Arbor, MI |
| 2/25/1995 | | Penn State | W 73–60 | 16–10 (8–6) | Assembly Hall; Bloomington, IN |
| 3/2/1995 | | Illinois; Rivalry | W 89–85 | 17–10 (9–6) | Assembly Hall; Bloomington, IN |
| 3/5/1995 | | at Michigan State | L 61–67 | 17–11 (9–7) | Breslin Center; East Lansing, MI |
| 3/8/1995 | | at Wisconsin | W 72–70 | 18–11 (10–7) | Wisconsin Field House; Madison, WI |
| 3/12/1995 | | Iowa | W 110–79 | 19–11 (11–7) | Assembly Hall; Bloomington, IN |
NCAA tournament
| 3/17/1995* | No. (9) | vs. No. (8) Missouri; First Round | L 60–65 | 19–12 (11–7) | BSU Arena; Boise, ID |
*Non-conference game. ^{#}Rankings from AP Poll. (#) Tournament seedings in parentheses.
