= 1994–95 Texas Tech Red Raiders basketball team =

American college basketball season

1994–95 Texas Tech Red Raiders basketball

SWC regular season co-champion

National Invitation Tournament First round, L, 94–82 v. Washington State
- Conference: Southwest Conference
- Record: 20–10, 2 wins vacated (11–3 SWC)
- Head coach: James Dickey (4th season)
- Assistant coach: Will Flemons (1st season)
- Home arena: Lubbock Municipal Coliseum

1994–95 Southwest Conference men's basketball standings
	Conf.				Overall
Team	W		L	PCT	W		L	PCT
Texas ^{#}†	11	–	3	.786	23	–	7	.767
Texas Tech ^{#}	11	–	3	.786	20	–	10	.667
TCU	8	–	6	.571	16	–	11	.593
Rice	8	–	6	.571	15	–	13	.536
Texas A&M	7	–	7	.500	14	–	16	.467
Houston	5	–	9	.357	9	–	19	.321
SMU	3	–	11	.214	7	–	20	.259
Baylor	3	–	11	.214	9	–	19	.321
† 1995 SWC tournament winner^{#} conference co-champion Rankings from AP Poll

The 1994–95 Texas Tech Red Raiders men's basketball team represented Texas Tech University in the Southwest Conference during the 1994–95 NCAA Division I men's basketball season. The head coach was James Dickey, his 4th year with the team. The Red Raiders played their home games in the Lubbock Municipal Coliseum in Lubbock, Texas.
