= Obilokwu Mbieri =

Village in Owerri, Imo

Obilokwu Mbieri is a village in southeastern Nigeria located near the city of Owerri.
