= Joe Griffin =

American basketball player

Personal information
- Born: c. 1972
- Listed height: 6 ft 5 in (1.96 m)

Career information
- College: LIU Brooklyn (1990–1995)
- NBA draft: 1995: undrafted
- Position: Small forward

Career highlights
- NEC Player of the Year (1995); 2× First-team All-NEC (1994, 1995); Haggerty Award winner (1995)

Joseph Griffin (born c. 1972) is an American former basketball player for Long Island University (LIU) between 1990–91 and 1994–95. He was 6 ft 5 in (1.96 m) and played the small forward position.

During his career as a Blackbird, Griffin scored 1,830 points, which is still the most all-time in school history. He was twice named to the All-Northeast Conference First Team, and as a senior in 1994–95 Griffin led the conference in scoring at 25.8 points per game. Griffin was subsequently named the Northeast Conference Men's Basketball Player of the Year and was the recipient of the coveted Haggerty Award, which is given annually to the best male collegiate basketball player in the greater New York City area. In 2010, he was inducted into the Long Island University Athletic Hall of Fame.

After college, Griffin became a licensed real estate agent as well as middle school teacher in the greater Atlanta, Georgia area. He earned his Master of Business Administration (MBA) from the University of Phoenix online in 2008. As of June 2011, Griffin works as an Associate Broker for Metro Brokers.
