= Miami RedHawks men's basketball statistical leaders =

The Miami Redhawks men's basketball statistical leaders are individual statistical leaders of the Miami Redhawks men's basketball program in various categories, including points, rebounds, assists, steals, and blocks. Within those areas, the lists identify single-game, single-season, and career leaders. The Redhawks represent Miami University in the NCAA Division I Mid-American Conference.

Miami began competing in intercollegiate basketball in 1905. However, the school's record book does not generally list records from before the 1950s, as records from before this period are often incomplete and inconsistent. Since scoring was much lower in this era, and teams played much fewer games during a typical season, it is likely that few or no players from this era would appear on these lists anyway.

The NCAA did not officially record assists as a stat until the 1983–84 season, and blocks and steals until the 1985–86 season, but Miami's record books includes players in these stats before these seasons.

These lists are updated through Miami's game against Western Michigan on February 27, 2026. Players active in the 2025–26 season are in bold.

== Scoring ==
Career
Rk	Player	Points	Seasons
1	Ron Harper	2,377	1982–83 1983–84 1984–85 1985–86
2	Wally Szczerbiak	1,847	1995–96 1996–97 1997–98 1998–99
3	Devin Davis	1,828	1993–94 1994–95 1995–96 1996–97
4	Mekhi Lairy	1,743	2018–19 2019–20 2020–21 2021–22 2022–23
5	Eric Newsome	1,679	1983–84 1984–85 1985–86 1986–87 1987–88
6	Damon Frierson	1,644	1995–96 1996–97 1997–98 1998–99
7	Michael Bramos	1,515	2005–06 2006–07 2007–08 2008–09
8	Landon Hackim	1,493	1992–93 1993–94 1994–95 1995–96
9	Archie Aldridge	1,490	1975–76 1976–77 1977–78
10	Nike Sibande	1,463	2017–18 2018–19 2019–20

Season
Rk	Player	Points	Season
1	Wally Szczerbiak	775	1998–99
2	Ron Harper	772	1984–85
3	Ron Harper	757	1985–86
4	Wayne Embry	672	1957–58
5	Fred Foster	617	1967–68
6	LeVern Benson	590	1961–62
7	Archie Aldridge	582	1977–78
8	Wayne Embry	578	1956–57
9	Eric Newsome	562	1985–86
10	Dae Dae Grant	561	2021–22

Single game
Rk	Player	Points	Season	Opponent
1	Ron Harper	45	1984–85	Ball State
2	Dick Walls	44	1952–53	Western Reserve
3	Wally Szczerbiak	43	1998–99	Washington
	Fred Foster	43	1967–68	Ball State
	John Powell	43	1957–58	Marshall
6	Wayne Embry	42	1956–57	Kent State
	**Peter Suder**	42	2024–25	Air Force
8	Ron Harper	41	1985–86	Toledo
	Charlie Coles	41	1964–65	Miami (FL)
	Wally Szczerbiak	41	1997–98	Dayton

== Rebounds ==
Career
Rk	Player	Rebounds	Seasons
1	Ron Harper	1,119	1982–83 1983–84 1984–85 1985–86
2	Wayne Embry	1,117	1955–56 1956–57 1957–58
3	Devin Davis	1,027	1993–94 1994–95 1995–96 1996–97
4	Dick Walls	978	1950–51 1951–52 1952–53
5	Chet Mason	806	2001–02 2002–03 2003–04 2004–05
6	Julian Mavunga	799	2008–09 2009–10 2010–11 2011–12
7	Bill Brown	798	1956–57 1957–58 1958–59
8	Jamie Mahaffey	790	1991–92 1992–93 1993–94 1994–95
9	Danny Horace	782	2001–02 2002–03 2003–04 2004–05
10	Ed Gunderson	697	1951–52 1952–53 1953–54

Season
Rk	Player	Rebounds	Season
1	Wayne Embry	488	1957–58
2	Wayne Embry	431	1956–57
3	Ron Harper	362	1985–86
4	Ron Harper	333	1984–85
	Dick Walls	333	1951–52
6	Dick Walls	328	1950–51
7	Dick Walls	317	1952–53
8	Ed Wingard	305	1958–59
9	Jim Patterson	300	1965–66
10	Fred Foster	288	1967–68

Single game
Rk	Player	Rebounds	Season	Opponent
1	Wayne Embry	34	1956–57	Kent State
	Wayne Embry	34	1956–57	Eastern Kentucky
3	Wayne Embry	27	1957–58	Heidelberg
4	Wayne Embry	26	1957–58	Xavier
	Wayne Embry	26	1957–58	Marshall
6	Dick Walls	25	1951–52	Xavier
7	Ron Harper	23	1985–86	Central Michigan
	Wayne Embry	23	1957–58	Western Michigan
	Wayne Embry	23	1957–58	Marshall
	Dick Walls	23	1950–51	Western Reserve

== Assists ==
Career
Rk	Player	Assists	Seasons
1	Eddie Schilling	629	1984–85 1985–86 1986–87 1987–88
2	Mekhi Lairy	440	2018–19 2019–20 2020–21 2021–22 2022–23
3	Rob Mestas	438	1995–96 1996–97 1997–98 1998–99 1999–00
4	Jamie Mercurio	413	1988–89 1989–90 1990–91 1991–92
5	Quinten Rollins	391	2010–11 2011–12 2012–13 2013–14
6	Darrian Ringo	387	2017–18 2018–19
7	Phil Lumpkin	384	1971–72 1972–73 1973–74
8	Derrick Cross	382	1991–92 1992–93 1993–94 1994–95
9	John Shoemaker	378	1974–75 1975–76 1976–77 1977–78
10	Randy Ayers	346	1974–75 1975–76 1976–77 1977–78

Season
Rk	Player	Assists	Season
1	Darrian Ringo	236	2017–18
2	Eddie Schilling	214	1984–85
3	Eddie Schilling	203	1986–87
4	Eric Washington	176	2014–15
5	Rob Mestas	166	1999–00
6	Michael Weathers	155	2016–17
7	Phil Lumpkin	154	1972–73
8	Darrian Ringo	151	2018–19
9	Luke Skaljac	149	2025–26
10	Phil Lumpkin	147	1973–74

Single game
Rk	Player	Assists	Season	Opponent
1	Eddie Schilling	17	1986–87	Kent State
2	Eddie Schilling	15	1986–87	Eastern Michigan
3	Darrian Ringo	14	2017–18	Midway
4	Eddie Schilling	14	1984–85	Toledo
	Eddie Schilling	14	1984–85	Central Michigan
6	Darrian Ringo	12	2018–19	Wilberforce
	Eddie Schilling	12	1986–87	Ohio Wesleyan
	Ron Harper	12	1985–86	Ball State
	Phil Lumpkin	12	1973–74	Syracuse
	Phil Lumpkin	12	1973–74	Cleveland State

== Steals ==
Career
Rk	Player	Steals	Seasons
1	Ron Harper	287	1982–83 1983–84 1984–85 1985–86
2	Quinten Rollins	214	2010–11 2011–12 2012–13 2013–14
3	Damon Frierson	175	1995–96 1996–97 1997–98 1998–99
4	Jamie Mahaffey	171	1991–92 1992–93 1993–94 1994–95
5	Derrick Cross	171	1991–92 1992–93 1993–94 1994–95
6	Geovonie McKnight	163	2012–13 2013–14 2014–15 2015–16
7	Darrian Ringo	158	2017–18 2018–19
8	Chet Mason	157	2001–02 2002–03 2003–04 2004–05
9	Scott Belyeu	149	1989–90 1990–91 1991–92 1992–93
10	Eddie Schilling	148	1984–85 1985–86 1986–87 1987–88

Season
Rk	Player	Steals	Season
1	Ron Harper	101	1985–86
2	Darrian Ringo	91	2017–18
3	Ron Harper	82	1984–85
4	Quinten Rollins	73	2013–14
5	Darrian Ringo	67	2018–19
6	Ron Harper	62	1982–83
7	Michael Weathers	60	2016–17
8	Jamie Mahaffey	59	1993–94
9	Quinten Rollins	58	2012–13
10	Jamie Mahaffey	53	1994–95

Single game
Rk	Player	Steals	Season	Opponent
1	Darrian Ringo	8	2017–18	LIU Brooklyn
2	Quinten Rollins	7	2013–14	Central Michigan
	Quinten Rollins	7	2012–13	Grambling State
	Damon Frierson	7	1998–99	Ball State
	Ron Harper	7	1984–85	Marietta
	Chuck Goodyear	7	1975–76	Toledo

== Blocks ==
Career
Rk	Player	Blocks	Seasons
1	Ron Harper	173	1982–83 1983–84 1984–85 1985–86
2	Jim Paul	144	1987–88 1988–89 1989–90 1990–91
3	Michael Bramos	130	2005–06 2006–07 2007–08 2008–09
4	Kevin Beard	109	1992–93 1993–94 1994–95 1995–96
5	Mike Williams	87	1990–91 1991–92
6	Wally Szczerbiak	79	1995–96 1996–97 1997–98 1998–99
7	Nick Winbush	74	2007–08 2008–09 2009–10 2010–11
	Devin Davis	74	1993–94 1994–95 1995–96 1996–97
9	Julian Mavunga	72	2008–09 2009–10 2010–11 2011–12
10	Danny Horace	71	2001–02 2002–03 2003–04 2004–05

Season
Rk	Player	Blocks	Season
1	Ron Harper	71	1985–86
2	Kevin Beard	48	1995–96
3	Michael Weathers	45	2016–17
4	Mike Williams	44	1991–92
	Jim Paul	44	1990–91
6	Mike Williams	43	1990–91
	Ron Harper	43	1984–85
8	Michael Bramos	42	2007–08
9	Michael Bramos	41	2006–07
10	Nathan Peavy	39	2006–07

Single game
Rk	Player	Blocks	Season	Opponent
1	Kevin Beard	7	1995–96	Toledo
	Ron Harper	7	1984–85	Bowling Green
3	Precious Ayah	6	2021–22	Toledo
	Chad Allen	6	1996–97	Eastern Kentucky
	Ron Harper	6	1985–86	Kent State
6	Anderson Mirambeaux	5	2022–23	Western Michigan
	Michael Weathers	5	2016–17	Kent State
	Logan McLane	5	2016–17	Muskingum
	Dion Wade	5	2015–16	Northern Illinois
	Blake McLimans	5	2013–14	Xavier
	Nick Winbush	5	2009–10	Buffalo
	Michael Bramos	5	2007–08	Central Michigan
	Nathan Peavy	5	2006–07	Akron
	Danny Horace	5	2001–02	Wright State
	Kevin Beard	5	1993–94	Dayton
	Mike Williams	5	1991–92	Dayton
	Mike Williams	5	1990–91	Miami (FL)
	Jim Paul	5	1990–91	Dayton
	Jim Paul	5	1987–88	Bowling Green
	Ron Harper	5	1985–86	Kent State
	Ron Harper	5	1985–86	Ball State
	Ron Harper	5	1985–86	Virginia Tech
	Ron Harper	5	1982–83	Kenyon
	Mike Kearney	5	1975–76	Dayton
