= Dae Dae Grant =

American basketball player (born 1998)

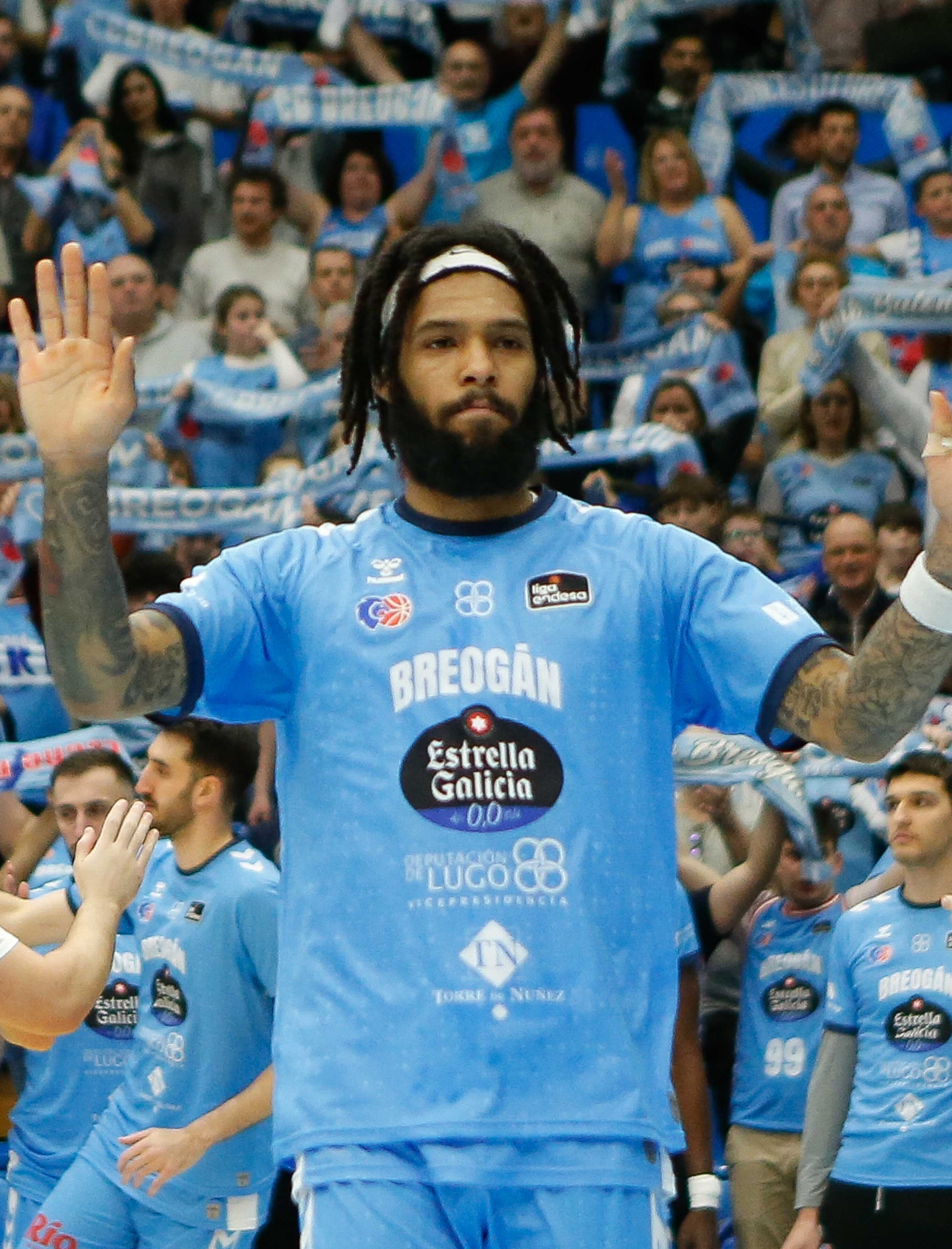
- Grant with CB Breogán in 2025

No. 1 – Kuwait SC
- Position: Point guard / shooting guard
- League: Kuwaiti Basketball League

Personal information
- Born: March 30, 2001 (age 25) Lorain, Ohio, U.S.
- Listed height: 6 ft 2 in (1.88 m)
- Listed weight: 169 lb (77 kg)

Career information
- High school: Lorain (Lorain, Ohio)
- College: Miami (Ohio) (2019–2022); Duquesne (2022–2024)
- NBA draft: 2024: undrafted
- Playing career: 2024–present

Career history
- 2024: KK SPD Radnički
- 2024–2025: CB Breogán
- 2025–2026: Trabzonspor
- 2026: Promitheas Patras
- 2026–present: Kuwait SC

Devone Octavon "Dae Dae" Grant (born March 30, 2001) is an American professional basketball player for Kuwait SC of the Kuwaiti Basketball League. He played college basketball for the Miami RedHawks and the Duquesne Dukes. Able to play as point guard or shooting guard, Grant is a combo guard.

== Early life and high school career ==
Grant was born and grew up in Lorain, Ohio. He was nicknamed "Dae Dae" by his mother. Grant attended and played high school basketball for Lorain High School. In 2019 he led the Lorain Titans to a 23-2 record, averaging 26.3 points, 5.2 rebounds, 2.8 assists and 1.8 steals per game in 2019. He was named First-Team All-State in Division I as senior. Playing for Lorain during 4 years, Grant scored a career-high 44 points and was named Mr. Basketball of Lorain County.

== College career ==
Grant began his collegiate career at Miami (Ohio). In his freshman year, Grant appeared in 32 games, averaging 9.3 points per game and being named to the All-MAC Freshmen Team. In his sophomore season appeared and started in 23 games, averaging 13.7 points and making the All-MAC Third Team.

Grant transferred to Duquesne in 2022. In his first year at Duquesne, he led the team in scoring and was the only player to play start in all 33 games. Grant won the 2024 Atlantic 10 men's basketball tournament with Duquesne and was named the tournament's MVP.

== Professional career ==
After finishing his college basketball career in 2024, Grant initially played 3 trial games for KK Feniks 2010 of North Macedonia, averaging over 28 points per game. He also shortly played for Serbian team KK SPD Radnički, playing 9 games and averaging 22.9 points per game.

In December 2024 Grant signed with CB Breogán of the Liga ACB, the first tier of Spanish basketball. Breogán signed Grant after point guard Charlie Moore sustained a long-term injury.

On July 17, 2025, Trabzonspor of the Turkish Basketbol Süper Ligi announced Grant as a new player.

On February 11, 2026, he signed for Promitheas Patras of the Greek Basketball League.

On August 23, 2026, he signed with Kuwait SC of the Kuwaiti Basketball League.

== Career statistics ==
Legend
GP	Games played	GS	Games started	MPG	Minutes per game
FG%	Field goal percentage	3P%	3-point field goal percentage	FT%	Free throw percentage
RPG	Rebounds per game	APG	Assists per game	SPG	Steals per game
BPG	Blocks per game	PPG	Points per game	**Bold**	Career high

=== Domestic leagues ===
Year	Team	League	GP	MPG	FG%	3P%	FT%	RPG	APG	SPG	BPG	PPG
2024–25	(Spain) Breogán	ACB	23	25.5	.416	.406	.867	2.8	3.1	.6	.1	14.2

=== College ===
Year	Team	GP	GS	MPG	FG%	3P%	FT%	RPG	APG	SPG	BPG	PPG
2019–20	Miami (OH)	32	29	22.3	.367	.342	.667	3.0	1.9	.5	**.1**	9.3
2020–21	Miami (OH)	23	23	29.9	.403	**.410**	.872	3.0	2.3	.9	.0	13.7
2021–22	Miami (OH)	32	32	**33.0**	**.423**	.343	.853	**4.7**	**4.1**	.9	**.1**	**17.5**
2022–23	Duquesne	33	**33**	32.6	.393	.403	.873	4.6	2.5	**1.2**	**.1**	15.5
2023–24	Duquesne	**34**	32	32.8	.386	.335	**.942**	3.4	2.4	1.0	**.1**	16.4
Career		154	149	30.2	.397	.366	.860	3.8	2.7	.9	.1	14.6

== See also ==
- Miami RedHawks men's basketball statistical leaders
