= 1983–84 Ohio Bobcats men's basketball team =

American college basketball season

1983–84 Ohio Bobcats men's basketball
- Conference: Mid-American Conference
- Record: 20–8 (14–4 MAC)
- Head coach: Danny Nee (4th season)
- Home arena: Convocation Center

1983–84 Mid-American Conference men's basketball standings
	Conf.				Overall
Team	W		L	PCT	W		L	PCT
Miami†	16	–	2	.889	24	–	6	.800
Ohio	14	–	4	.778	20	–	8	.714
Bowling Green	11	–	7	.611	18	–	10	.643
Toledo	11	–	7	.611	18	–	11	.621
Northern Illinois	9	–	9	.500	12	–	15	.444
Eastern Michigan	8	–	10	.444	12	–	17	.414
Kent State	8	–	10	.444	15	–	14	.517
Central Michigan	6	–	12	.333	11	–	16	.407
Ball State	5	–	13	.278	8	–	19	.296
Western Michigan	2	–	16	.111	4	–	22	.154
† Mid-American Conference tournament winner Rankings from AP Poll

The 1983–84 Ohio Bobcats men's basketball team represented Ohio University as a member of the Mid-American Conference in the college basketball season of 1983–84. The team was coached by Danny Nee in his third season at Ohio. They played their home games at Convocation Center. The Bobcats finished with a record of 20–8 and second in the MAC regular season with a conference record of 14–4.

== Schedule ==
Date time, TV	Rank^{#}	Opponent^{#}	Result	Record	Site (attendance) city, state
Regular Season
11/26/1983*		Charleston (WV)	W 75–51	1–0	
11/30/1983*		at No. 16 DePaul	L 45–69	1–1	
12/3/1983*		at Pennsylvania	W 71–67	2–1	
12/7/1983*		at Duke	L 63–82	2–2	
12/10/1983*		Niagara	W 84–68	3–2	
12/17/1983*		at Ohio State	L 69–73	3–3	
12/27/1983*		Brooklyn	W 55–48	4–3	
12/29/1983*		at Manhattan	W 78–57	5–3	
12/30/1983*		at Siena	W 69–56	6–3	
MAC regular season
1/4/1984		at Kent State	W 65–55	7–3 (1–0)	
1/7/1984		Ball State	W 66–48	8–3 (2–0)	
1/11/1984		at Western Michigan	W 83–58	9–3 (3–0)	
1/14/1984		at Miami (OH)	L 38–51	9–4 (3–1)	
1/18/1984		Central Michigan	W 57–56	10-4 (4–1)	
1/21/1984		at Bowling Green	L 46–51	10-5 (4–2)	
1/25/1984		Eastern Michigan	W 65–47	11–5 (5–2)	
1/28/1984		at Toledo	W 69–65	12–5 (6–2)	
2/1/1984		Northern Illinois	W 79–51	13–5 (7–2)	
2/4/1984		at Ball State	L 60–63	13–6 (7–3)	
2/8/1984		Western Michigan	W 67–54	14–6 (8–3)	
2/11/1984		Miami (OH)	W 82–68	15–6 (9–3)	
2/15/1984		at Central Michigan	W 76–60	16–6 (10–3)	
2/18/1984		Bowling Green	L 45–52	16–7 (10–4)	
2/22/1984		at Eastern Michigan	W 73–71	17–7 (11–4)	
2/25/1984		Toledo	W 59–52	18–7 (12–4)	
2/29/1984		at Northern Illinois	W 85–65	19–7 (13–4)	
3/3/1984		at Kent State	W 53–49	20–7 (14–4)	
MAC tournament
3/9/1984		vs. Kent State; Quarterfinals	L 53–57	20–8 (14–5)	
*Non-conference game. ^{#}Rankings from AP Poll. (#) Tournament seedings in parentheses. All times are in Eastern Time.

== Statistics ==
=== Team statistics ===
Final 1983–84 statistics

Record	Ohio	OPP
Scoring	1820	1644
Scoring Average	65.00	58.71
Field goals – Att	727–1520	625–1471
Free throws – Att	366–527	394–602
Rebounds	990	887
Assists	408	352
Turnovers	398	403
Steals	171	178
Blocked Shots	116	59

=== Player statistics ===
			Minutes		Scoring		Total FGs			Free-Throws			Rebounds						
Player	GP	GS	Tot	Avg	Pts	Avg	FG	FGA	Pct	FT	FTA	Pct	Tot	Avg	A	PF	TO	Stl	Blk
John Devereaux	27	27	894	33.1	504	18.7	199	364	0.547	106	132	0.803	277	10.3	40	76	53	15	70
Vic Alexander	28	16	771	27.5	357	12.8	149	307	0.485	59	91	0.648	158	5.6	8	98	49	12	21
Robert Tatum	28	28	952	34.0	328	11.7	128	265	0.483	72	85	0.847	69	2.5	82	66	65	38	2
Rick Scarberry	27	7	349	21.0	120	4.4	58	129	0.450	4	6	0.667	23	2.3	23	18	16	7	0
Eddie Hicks	25	7	525	12.9	110	4.4	42	86	0.488	26	38	0.684	58	0.9	15	57	30	20	4
Paul Baron	28	27	851	30.4	106	3.8	36	103	0.350	34	61	0.557	92	3.3	158	71	81	37	3
Nate Cole	25	5	381	15.2	90	3.6	38	91	0.418	14	35	0.400	59	2.4	8	47	11	9	6
Roger Smith	27	0	388	13.1	81	3.2	30	69	0.435	21	33	0.636	32	1.8	44	39	42	20	2
David Kowalski	17	9	223	14.4	54	3.0	20	47	0.426	14	19	0.737	31	1.2	8	27	16	6	0
Sean Carlson	28	3	306	3.8	39	1.8	16	38	0.421	7	14	0.500	80	0.8	16	48	28	1	8
_ Bruning	11	0	42	10.9	20	1.4	7	13	0.538	6	8	0.750	9	2.9	4	3	4	4	0
Steve Becvar	11	1	43	3.9	11	1.0	4	8	0.500	3	5	0.600	11	1.0	2	7	3	2	0
Total	28	-	0	-	1820	65.0	727	1520	0.478	366	527	0.694	990	35.4	408	557	398	171	116
Opponents	28	-	0	-	1644	58.7	625	1471	0.425	394	602	0.654	887	31.7	352	502	403	178	59

Legend
GP	Games played	GS	Games started	Avg	Average per game
FG	Field-goals made	FGA	Field-goal attempts	Off	Offensive rebounds
Def	Defensive rebounds	A	Assists	TO	Turnovers
Blk	Blocks	Stl	Steals	High	Team high
