= 1977–78 Miami Redskins men's basketball team =

American college basketball season

1977–78 Miami Redskins men's basketball

MAC champions

NCAA tournament, Sweet Sixteen
- Conference: Mid-American Conference

Ranking
- AP: No. 19
- Record: 19–9 (12–4 MAC)
- Head coach: Darrell Hedric (8th season)
- Home arena: Millett Hall

1977–78 Mid-American Conference men's basketball standings
| | Conf. | | | | Overall |
| Team | W | | L | PCT | W | | L | PCT |
|---|---|---|---|---|---|---|---|---|
| No. 19 Miami (Ohio) | 12 | – | 4 | .750 | 19 | – | 9 | .679 |
| Toledo | 11 | – | 5 | .688 | 21 | – | 6 | .778 |
| Central Michigan | 11 | – | 5 | .688 | 16 | – | 10 | .615 |
| Bowling Green State | 10 | – | 6 | .625 | 12 | – | 15 | .444 |
| Northern Illinois | 9 | – | 7 | .563 | 11 | – | 16 | .407 |
| Eastern Michigan | 7 | – | 9 | .438 | 11 | – | 16 | .407 |
| Ohio | 6 | – | 10 | .375 | 13 | – | 14 | .481 |
| Ball State | 6 | – | 10 | .375 | 10 | – | 15 | .400 |
| Western Michigan | 4 | – | 12 | .250 | 7 | – | 20 | .259 |
| Kent State | 4 | – | 12 | .250 | 6 | – | 21 | .222 |
Rankings from AP Poll

The 1977–78 Miami Redskins men's basketball team represent Miami University in the 1977–78 NCAA Division I men's basketball season. The Redskins, led by 8th-year head coach Darrell Hedric, played their home games at Millett Hall in Oxford, Ohio as members of the Mid-American Conference. The team finished atop the conference regular season standings to earn a bid to the NCAA tournament. As the No. 3 automatic qualifying seed in the Mideast region, Miami defeated defending NCAA champion Marquette in the opening round before losing to eventual National champion Kentucky, 91–69, in the Sweet Sixteen.

== Roster ==
1977–78 Miami RedHawks men's basketball team
Players
Coaches

| Pos. | # | Name | Height | Weight | Year | Hometown |
|---|---|---|---|---|---|---|
| F | 44 | Archie Aldridge | 6 ft 5 in (1.96 m) | — | Sr | Middletown, Ohio |
| F | | Randy Ayers | 6 ft 6 in (1.98 m) | — | Sr | Springfield, Ohio |
| F | | Rick Goins | 6 ft 5 in (1.96 m) | — | So |
| G | | John Shoemaker | 6 ft 2 in (1.88 m) | — | Sr |
| G | | Tom Dunn | 6 ft 2 in (1.88 m) | — | So |
| C | | Bill Lake | 6 ft 11 in (2.11 m) | — | Sr |
| F | | Bernard Newman | 6 ft 5 in (1.96 m) | — | Sr |
| F | | Todd Jones | 6 ft 5 in (1.96 m) | — | Jr |
| G | | Rich Babcock | 6 ft 11 in (2.11 m) | — | Jr |
| F | | Rick Lantz | 6 ft 4 in (1.93 m) | — | Fr |
| F | | Jim Harkins | 6 ft 4 in (1.93 m) | — | Fr |
| C | | Terry Brady | 6 ft 10 in (2.08 m) | — | Jr |
| | | Phil Greisinger | — | — | Jr |
| G | | Brian Bays | 6 ft 2 in (1.88 m) | — | So |

Head coach

- Darrell Hedric (Miami (OH))

Assistant coach(es)

- Joe Barry
- Jerry Peirson

Legend

- (C) Team captain
- (S) Suspended
- (I) Ineligible
- (W) Walk-on
- Injured
- Current redshirt

== Schedule and results ==
| Date time, TV | Rank^{#} | Opponent^{#} | Result | Record | Site (attendance) city, state |
Non-conference regular season
| Nov 30, 1977* | | Otterbein | W 62–61 | 1–0 | Millett Hall; Oxford, Ohio |
| Dec 3, 1977* | | Xavier | W 62–61 | 2–0 | Millett Hall; Oxford, Ohio |
| Dec 6, 1977* | | at No. 7 Cincinnati | L 60–61 | 2–1 | Riverfront Coliseum; Cincinnati, Ohio |
| Dec 10, 1977 | | Ball State | W 73–68 ^{OT} | 3–1 (1–0) | Millett Hall; Oxford, Ohio |
| Dec 13, 1977* | | Wright State | W 73–69 | 4–1 | Millett Hall; Oxford, Ohio |
| Dec 21, 1977* | | at Purdue | W 84–80 ^{OT} | 5–1 | Mackey Arena; West Lafayette, Indiana |
| Dec 27, 1977* | | vs. Texas A&M; All-College Tournament | W 79–68 | 6–1 | Myriad Convention Center; Oklahoma City, Oklahoma |
| Dec 29, 1977* | | vs. No. 19 San Francisco; All-College Tournament | L 88–91 | 6–2 | Myriad Convention Center; Oklahoma City, Oklahoma |
| Dec 30, 1977* | | vs. Boston College; All-College Tournament | L 76–81 | 6–3 | Myriad Convention Center; Oklahoma City, Oklahoma |
MAC regular season
| Jan 4, 1978 | | Bowling Green | W 85–66 | 7–3 (2–0) | Millett Hall; Oxford, Ohio |
| Jan 7, 1978 | | at Western Michigan | L 69–79 | 7–4 (2–1) | Read Fieldhouse; Kalamazoo, Michigan |
| Jan 11, 1978* | | at Dayton | L 66–73 | 7–5 | UD Arena; Dayton, Ohio |
| Jan 14, 1978 | | Ohio | W 90–77 | 8–5 (3–1) | Millett Hall; Oxford, Ohio |
| Jan 18, 1978 | | at Central Michigan | W 80–76 | 9–5 (4–1) | Daniel P. Rose Center; Mount Pleasant, Michigan |
| Jan 25, 1978 | | at Toledo | W 79–70 | 10–5 (5–1) | Centennial Hall; Toledo, Ohio |
| Jan 30, 1978 | | Northern Illinois | W 72–56 | 11–5 (6–1) | Millett Hall; Oxford, Ohio |
| Feb 4, 1978 | | at Kent State | L 54–55 | 11–6 (6–2) | Memorial Athletic and Convocation Center; Kent, Ohio |
| Feb 8, 1978 | | at Bowling Green | W 68–54 | 12–6 (7–2) | Anderson Arena; Bowling Green, Ohio |
| Feb 11, 1978 | | Western Michigan | W 82–61 | 13–6 (8–2) | Millett Hall; Oxford, Ohio |
| Feb 15, 1978* | | Dayton | W 63–60 | 14–6 | Millett Hall; Oxford, Ohio |
| Feb 18, 1978 | | at Ohio | W 70–66 | 15–6 (9–2) | Convocation Center; Athens, Ohio |
| Feb 22, 1978 | | Central Michigan | W 78–74 | 16–6 (10–2) | Millett Hall; Oxford, Ohio |
| Feb 25, 1978 | | at Eastern Michigan | L 69–76 | 16–7 (10–3) | Bowen Field House; Ypsilanti, Michigan |
| Mar 1, 1978 | | Toledo | L 79–81 ^{OT} | 16–8 (10–4) | Millett Hall; Oxford, Ohio |
| Mar 4, 1978 | | at Ball State | W 74–67 | 17–8 (11–4) | Irving Gymnasium; Muncie, Indiana |
| Mar 6, 1978 | | Eastern Michigan | W 84–67 | 18–8 (12–4) | Millett Hall; Oxford, Ohio |
NCAA tournament
| Mar 11, 1978* | (ME 3Q) | vs. (ME 1L) No. 3 Marquette; First round | W 84–81 ^{OT} | 19–8 | Market Square Arena (16,519); Indianapolis, Indiana |
| Mar 16, 1978* | (ME 3Q) No. 19 | vs. (ME 2Q) No. 1 Kentucky; Mideast Regional Semifinal – Sweet Sixteen | L 69–91 | 19–9 | UD Arena; Dayton, Ohio |
*Non-conference game. ^{#}Rankings from AP Poll. (#) Tournament seedings in parentheses. ME=Mideast. All times are in Eastern Time.

== Awards and honors ==
- Archie Aldridge – MAC Player of the Year
