= 1994–95 Ohio Bobcats men's basketball team =

American college basketball season

1994–95 Ohio Bobcats men's basketball

Preseason NIT champions

National Invitation Tournament, Second Round
- Conference: Mid-American Conference
- Record: 24–10 (13–5 MAC)
- Head coach: Larry Hunter (6th season)
- Assistant coaches: Jayson Gee; Mike Elfers; Dan Aloi
- Home arena: Convocation Center

1994–95 Mid-American Conference men's basketball standings
	Conf.				Overall
Team	W		L	PCT	W		L	PCT
Miami	16	–	2	.889	23	–	7	.767
Ohio	13	–	5	.722	24	–	10	.706
Eastern Michigan	12	–	6	.667	20	–	10	.667
Ball State †	11	–	7	.611	19	–	11	.633
Bowling Green	10	–	8	.556	16	–	11	.593
Toledo	10	–	8	.556	16	–	11	.593
Western Michigan	9	–	9	.500	14	–	13	.519
Kent State	5	–	13	.278	8	–	19	.296
Akron	4	–	14	.222	8	–	18	.308
Central Michigan	0	–	18	.000	3	–	23	.115
† 1995 MAC tournament winner Rankings from AP Poll

The 1994–95 Ohio Bobcats men's basketball team represented Ohio University in the college basketball season of 1994–95. The team was coached by Larry Hunter and played their home games at the Convocation Center. The Bobcats won the 1994 Preseason NIT at Madison Square Garden, downing New Mexico State 84-80 in the championship game, and defeated Ohio State in Columbus in the same tournament.

== Roster ==
1994–95 Ohio Bobcats men's basketball team
Players
Coaches

Pos.	#	Name	Height	Weight	Year	Hometown
F	45	Jeff Boals	6 ft 7 in (2.01 m)	240 lb (109 kg)	Sr	Magnolia, OH
F	43	Ryan Greenwood	6 ft 7 in (2.01 m)	240 lb (109 kg)	Sr	Indianapolis, IN
G	23	Mike Reese	6 ft 2 in (1.88 m)	190 lb (86 kg)	Sr	Hamilton, OH
G	21	Gus Johnson	6 ft 0 in (1.83 m)	170 lb (77 kg)	Jr	Huron, OH
C	50	Ed Sears	6 ft 9 in (2.06 m)	280 lb (127 kg)	Jr	Brooklyn, N.Y
C	52	Jason Terry	7 ft 2 in (2.18 m)	235 lb (107 kg)	Jr	Mount Gilead, OH
F	20	Gary Trent	6 ft 8 in (2.03 m)	240 lb (109 kg)	Jr	Columbus, OH
G	12	Geno Ford	5 ft 8 in (1.73 m)	160 lb (73 kg)	So	Cambridge, OH
F	44	Curtis Simmons	6 ft 5 in (1.96 m)	216 lb (98 kg)	So	Columbus, OH
G	31	Chet Feldman	6 ft 0 in (1.83 m)	180 lb (82 kg)	Fr	Munroe Falls, OH
F	--	Basra Fakhir	6 ft 5 in (1.96 m)	240 lb (109 kg)	Fr	East Cleveland, OH
C	41	Andy Kanzig	6 ft 10 in (2.08 m)	280 lb (127 kg)	Fr	Perrysville, OH
G	22	Jim Peterson	6 ft 5 in (1.96 m)	192 lb (87 kg)	Fr	Beaver Falls, PA
F	32	Josh Stivison	6 ft 7 in (2.01 m)	210 lb (95 kg)	Fr	Lancaster, OH

Head coach

- Larry Hunter

Assistant coach(es)

- Jayson Gee
- Mike Elfers
- Dan Aloi

Legend

- (C) Team captain
- (S) Suspended
- (I) Ineligible
- (W) Walk-on
- Injured
- Current redshirt

== Schedule and results ==
Date time, TV	Rank^{#}	Opponent^{#}	Result	Record	Site city, state
Regular Season
Nov 16, 1994*		at Ohio State; Preseason NIT	W 78–67	1–0	St. John Arena; Columbus, Ohio
Nov 17, 1994*		at No. 14 Virginia; Preseason NIT	W 94–83	2–0	University Hall; Charlottesville, Virginia
Nov 18, 1994*	No. 23	vs. George Washington; Preseason NIT	W 82–76	3–0	Madison Square Garden; New York, New York
Nov 19, 1994*	No. 23	vs. New Mexico State; Preseason NIT	W 84–80 ^{OT}	4–0	Madison Square Garden; New York, New York
Nov 30, 1994*	No. 14	at No. 3 Kentucky	L 74–79	4–1	Rupp Arena (24,212); Lexington, Kentucky
Dec 2, 1994*	No. 14	vs. UC Irvine; Hawkeye Invitational	W 81–72 ^{OT}	5–1	Carver-Hawkeye Arena (13,045); Iowa City, Iowa
Dec 3, 1994*	No. 14	at Iowa; Hawkeye Invitational	L 75–91	5–2	Carver-Hawkeye Arena (14,563); Iowa City, Iowa
Dec 7, 1994*	No. 21	Ohio Dominican	W 87–57	6–2	Convocation Center; Athens, Ohio
Dec 13, 1994*	No. 19	Wright State	W 90–56	7–2	Convocation Center; Athens, Ohio
Dec 17, 1994*	No. 19	at Xavier	L 71–90	7–3	Cincinnati Gardens; Cincinnati, Ohio
Dec 20, 1994*		West Virginia	W 84–70	8–3	Convocation Center; Athens, Ohio
Dec 30, 1994*		Duquesne	W 71–58	9–3	Convocation Center; Athens, Ohio
MAC regular season
Jan 4, 1995		Ball State	W 65–59	10–3 (1–0)	Convocation Center; Athens, Ohio
Jan 7, 1995		at Miami (OH)	L 55–64	10–4 (1–1)	Millett Hall; Oxford, Ohio
Jan 11, 1995		Kent State	W 85–62	11–4 (2–1)	Convocation Center; Athens, Ohio
Jan 14, 1995		Bowling Green	W 70–60	12–4 (3–1)	Convocation Center; Athens, Ohio
Jan 18, 1995		at Toledo	W 73–72	13–4 (4–1)	Savage Hall; Toledo, Ohio
Jan 21, 1995		Akron	W 81–61	14–4 (5–1)	Convocation Center; Athens, Ohio
Jan 25, 1995		at Western Michigan	W 80–68	15–4 (6–1)	University Arena; Kalamazoo, Michigan
Jan 28, 1995		Central Michigan	W 96–59	16–4 (7–1)	Convocation Center; Athens, Ohio
Feb 1, 1995		at Eastern Michigan	L 79–85	16–5 (7–2)	Bowen Field House; Ypsilanti, Michigan
Feb 4, 1995		Miami (OH)	L 69–80	16–6 (7–3)	Convocation Center; Athens, Ohio
Feb 8, 1995		at Kent State	W 75–64	17–6 (8–3)	Memorial Athletic and Convocation Center; Kent, Ohio
Feb 11, 1995		at Bowling Green	L 68–79	17–7 (8–4)	Anderson Arena; Bowling Green, Ohio
Feb 15, 1995		Toledo	W 89–62	18–7 (9–4)	Convocation Center; Athens, Ohio
Feb 18, 1995		at Akron	W 75–58	19–7 (10–4)	James A. Rhodes Arena; Akron, Ohio
Feb 22, 1995		Western Michigan	W 91–77	20–7 (10–4)	Convocation Center; Athens, Ohio
Feb 25, 1995		at Central Michigan	W 78–53	21–7 (11–4)	Rose Arena; Mount Pleasant, Michigan
Mar 1, 1995		Eastern Michigan	W 75–60	22–7 (12–4)	Convocation Center; Athens, Ohio
Mar 4, 1995		at Ball State	L 85–96	22–8 (12–6)	Worthen Arena; Muncie, Indiana
MAC tournament
Mar 7, 1995*		Western Michigan; MAC Tournament Quarterfinal	W 72–56	23–8	Convocation Center; Athens, Ohio
Mar 10, 1995*		vs. Eastern Michigan; MAC Tournament Semifinal	L 72–78	23–9	John F. Savage Hall; Toledo, Ohio
NIT
Mar 16, 1995*		George Washington; First Round	W 83–71	24–9	Convocation Center; Athens, Ohio
Mar 21, 1995*		at Iowa; Second Round	L 62–66	24–10	Carver-Hawkeye Arena; Iowa City, Iowa
*Non-conference game. ^{#}Rankings from AP Poll. (#) Tournament seedings in parentheses.

== Statistics ==
=== Team statistics ===
Final 1993–94 statistics

Record	Ohio	OPP
Scoring	2649	2369
Scoring Average	77.91	69.68
Field goals – Att	945–2017	818–2043
3-pt. Field goals – Att	178–528	188–582
Free throws – Att	581–876	545–805
Rebounds	1410	1187
Assists	524	440
Turnovers	516	447
Steals	186	272
Blocked Shots	134	89

=== Player statistics ===
			Minutes		Scoring		Total FGs			3-point FGs			Free-Throws			Rebounds								
Player	GP	GS	Tot	Avg	Pts	Avg	FG	FGA	Pct	3FG	3FA	Pct	FT	FTA	Pct	Off	Def	Tot	Avg	A	PF	TO	Stl	Blk
Gary Trent	33	-	-	-	757	22.9	293	556	0.527	8	35	0.229	163	254	0.642	-	-	423	12.8	79	75	115	20	26
Geno Ford	33	-	-	-	371	11.2	116	279	0.416	48	131	0.366	91	118	0.771	-	-	68	2.1	90	93	60	42	0
Curtis Simmons	34	-	-	-	365	10.7	143	262	0.546	10	21	0.476	69	100	0.69	-	-	237	7	73	82	0	43	15
Gus Johnson	33	-	-	-	315	9.5	91	262	0.347	73	216	0.338	60	79	0.759	-	-	74	2.2	44	72	31	35	3
Jason Terry	34	-	-	-	301	8.9	109	186	0.586	0	1	0	83	129	0.643	-	-	156	4.6	21	88	60	1	73
Mike Reese	34	-	-	-	145	4.3	53	139	0.381	12	40	0.3	27	36	0.75	-	-	103	3	112	79	59	19	5
Ed Sears	34	-	-	-	145	4.3	53	108	0.491	0	0	0	39	72	0.542	-	-	82	2.4	13	65	0	3	6
Jeff Boals	20	-	-	-	104	5.2	42	100	0.42	4	19	0.211	16	30	0.533	-	-	88	4.4	63	56	45	9	1
Jim Peterson	27	-	-	-	84	3.1	27	73	0.37	22	57	0.386	8	15	0.533	-	-	15	0.6	6	20	8	0	1
Ryan Greenwood	26	-	-	-	32	1.2	10	25	0.4	0	2	0	12	23	0.522	-	-	46	1.8	15	20	8	8	4
Josh Stivison	13	-	-	-	16	1.2	6	18	0.333	0	1	0	4	8	0.5	-	-	8	0.6	1	3	3	0	0
Chet Feldman	18	-	-	-	14	0.8	2	9	0.222	1	5	0.2	9	12	0.75	-	-	9	0.5	7	8	7	6	0
Total	34	-	-	-	2649	77.9	945	2017	0.469	178	528	0.337	581	876	0.663			1410	41.5	524	661	516	186	134
Opponents	33	-	-	-	2369	71.8	818	2043	0.400	188	582	0.323	545	805	0.667			1187	36.0	440	745	447	272	89

Legend
GP	Games played	GS	Games started	Avg	Average per game
FG	Field-goals made	FGA	Field-goal attempts	Off	Offensive rebounds
Def	Defensive rebounds	A	Assists	TO	Turnovers
Blk	Blocks	Stl	Steals	High	Team high

== Awards and honors ==
- Gary Trent – MAC Player of the Year (3x)

== Team players drafted into the NBA ==
Round	Pick	Player	NBA club
1	11	Gary Trent	Milwaukee Bucks
