= 1995 MAC men's basketball tournament =

Postseason championship basketball tournament for the Mid-American Conference

- Classification: Division I
- Season: 1994–95
- Teams: 8
- Site: Savage Arena; Toledo, Ohio
- Champions: Ball State (6th title)
- Winning coach: Ray McCallum (1st title)
- MVP: Steve Payne (Ball State)
- MAC men's basketball tournaments

1994–95 Mid-American Conference men's basketball standings
	Conf.				Overall
Team	W		L	PCT	W		L	PCT
Miami	16	–	2	.889	23	–	7	.767
Ohio	13	–	5	.722	24	–	10	.706
Eastern Michigan	12	–	6	.667	20	–	10	.667
Ball State †	11	–	7	.611	19	–	11	.633
Bowling Green	10	–	8	.556	16	–	11	.593
Toledo	10	–	8	.556	16	–	11	.593
Western Michigan	9	–	9	.500	14	–	13	.519
Kent State	5	–	13	.278	8	–	19	.296
Akron	4	–	14	.222	8	–	18	.308
Central Michigan	0	–	18	.000	3	–	23	.115
† 1995 MAC tournament winner Rankings from AP Poll

The 1995 MAC men's basketball tournament, a part of the 1994–95 NCAA Division I men's basketball season, took place at Savage Arena in Toledo, Ohio. Its winner received the Mid-American Conference's automatic bid to the 1995 NCAA tournament. It was a single-elimination tournament with three rounds and the top eight MAC teams invited to participate. No teams received byes in the tournament. Miami received the number one seed in the tournament.

== Tournament ==
=== Seeds ===
1. Miami
2. Ohio
3. Eastern Michigan
4. Ball State
5. Bowling Green
6. Toledo
7. Western Michigan
8. Kent State

=== Bracket ===
Quarterfinals
1	Miami	77
8	Kent State	49
4	Ball State	72
5	Bowling Green	58
3	Eastern Michigan	69
6	Toledo	61
2	Ohio	72
7	Western Michigan	56

Semifinals
1	Miami	61
4	Ball State	66
3	Eastern Michigan	78
2	Ohio	72

Finals
4	Ball State	77
3	Eastern Michigan	70

* Overtime period
