= 1992 MAC men's basketball tournament =

- Classification: Division I
- Season: 1991–92
- Teams: 8
- Site: Cobo Arena; Detroit, Michigan
- Champions: Miami (OH) (2nd title)
- Winning coach: Joby Wright (1st title)
- MVP: Bill Gillis (Ball State)
- MAC men's basketball tournaments

1991–92 Mid-American Conference men's basketball standings
	Conf.				Overall
Team	W		L	PCT	W		L	PCT
Miami (OH) †	13	–	3	.813	23	–	8	.742
Ball State	11	–	5	.688	24	–	9	.727
Western Michigan	11	–	5	.688	21	–	9	.700
Ohio	10	–	6	.625	18	–	10	.643
Bowling Green	8	–	8	.500	14	–	15	.483
Kent State	6	–	10	.375	9	–	19	.321
Central Michigan	6	–	10	.375	12	–	16	.429
Eastern Michigan	4	–	12	.250	9	–	22	.290
Toledo	3	–	13	.188	7	–	20	.259
† 1992 MAC tournament winner Rankings from AP Poll

The 1992 MAC men's basketball tournament took place March 13–15, 1992, at Cobo Arena in Detroit, Michigan. Miami (OH) defeated Ball State, 58–57 in the championship game, to win its second MAC Tournament title, and deny the Cardinals a third straight tournament championship.

The Redskins earned an automatic bid to the 1992 NCAA tournament as #13 seed in the Southeast region. In the round of 64, Miami fell to North Carolina 68–63.

== Format ==
Eight of nine conference members participated, with play beginning in the quarterfinal round. Toledo was left out of the tournament field.

== Bracket ==
Quarterfinals; March 13
1	Miami (OH)	67
8	Eastern Michigan	66
4	Ohio	46
5	Bowling Green	54
3	Western Michigan	61
6	Kent State	57
2	Ball State	79
7	Central Michigan	65

Semifinals; March 14
1	Miami (OH)	70
5	Bowling Green	60
3	Western Michigan	61
2	Ball State	65

Final; March 15
1	Miami (OH)	58
2	Ball State	57
