= 1994–95 Miami Redskins men's basketball team =

American college basketball season

1994–95 Miami RedHawks men's basketball

MAC Regular season champion

NCAA tournament, Second round
- Conference: Mid-American Conference
- Record: 23–7 (16–2 MAC)
- Head coach: Herb Sendek (2nd season)
- Home arena: Millett Hall

1994–95 Mid-American Conference men's basketball standings
	Conf.				Overall
Team	W		L	PCT	W		L	PCT
Miami	16	–	2	.889	23	–	7	.767
Ohio	13	–	5	.722	24	–	10	.706
Eastern Michigan	12	–	6	.667	20	–	10	.667
Ball State †	11	–	7	.611	19	–	11	.633
Bowling Green	10	–	8	.556	16	–	11	.593
Toledo	10	–	8	.556	16	–	11	.593
Western Michigan	9	–	9	.500	14	–	13	.519
Kent State	5	–	13	.278	8	–	19	.296
Akron	4	–	14	.222	8	–	18	.308
Central Michigan	0	–	18	.000	3	–	23	.115
† 1995 MAC tournament winner Rankings from AP Poll

The 1994–95 Miami Redskins men's basketball team represent Miami University in the 1994–95 NCAA Division I men's basketball season. The Redskins, led by second-year head coach Herb Sendek, played their home games at Millett Hall in Oxford, Ohio as members of the Mid-American Conference. The team finished atop the conference regular season standings and was awarded an at-large bid to the NCAA tournament. As the No. 12 seed in the Midwest region, Miami upset No. 5 seed Arizona in the opening round before losing to No. 4 seed Virginia in the round of 32. The Redskins finished with a 23–7 record (16–2 MAC).

== Roster ==
1994–95 Miami Redskins men's basketball team
Players	Coaches
Pos. / # / Name / Height / Weight / Year / Hometown; F / 42 / Devin Davis / 6 ft 7 in (2.01 m) / 225 lb (102 kg) / So / Miami, Florida	Head coach: Herb Sendek (Miami (OH)); Assistant coach(es) Legend: (C) Team captain; (S) Suspended; (I) Ineligible; (W) Walk-on; Injured; Current redshirt

== Schedule and results ==
Date time, TV	Rank^{#}	Opponent^{#}	Result	Record	Site (attendance) city, state
Regular season
Nov 30, 1994*		at Xavier	L 70–89	1–1	Cincinnati Gardens; Cincinnati, Ohio
Dec 5, 1994*		Dayton	W 81–72	2–1	Millett Hall; Oxford, Ohio
Dec 30, 1994*		at Wright State	W 69–61	5–3	Nutter Center; Fairborn, Ohio
MAC tournament
Mar 7, 1995*		Kent State; Quarterfinals	W 77–49	22–5	Millett Hall; Oxford, Ohio
Mar 10, 1995*		vs. Ball State; Semifinals	L 61–66	22–6	John F. Savage Hall; Toledo, Ohio
NCAA tournament
Mar 16, 1995*	(12 MW)	vs. (5 MW) No. 15 Arizona; First Round	W 71–62	23–6	University of Dayton Arena; Dayton, Ohio
Mar 18, 1995*	(12 MW)	vs. (4 MW) No. 13 Virginia; Second Round	L 54–60 ^{OT}	23–7	University of Dayton Arena; Dayton, Ohio
*Non-conference game. ^{#}Rankings from AP poll. (#) Tournament seedings in parentheses. MW=Midwest. All times are in Eastern Time.
