= Randy Ayers =

American basketball coach (born 1956)

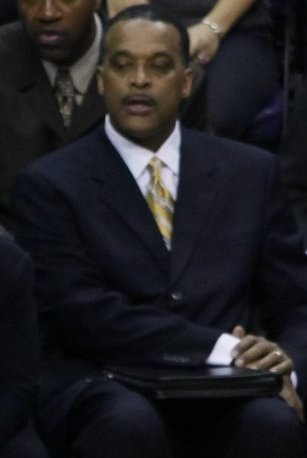
- Ayers in 2009.

Phoenix Suns
- Position: Assistant coach / Coaching advisor
- League: NBA

Personal information
- Born: April 16, 1956 (age 70) Springfield, Ohio, U.S.
- Listed height: 6 ft 6 in (1.98 m)
- Listed weight: 195 lb (88 kg)

Career information
- High school: North (Springfield, Ohio)
- College: Miami (Ohio) (1974–1978)
- NBA draft: 1978: 3rd round, 53rd overall pick
- Drafted by: Chicago Bulls
- Coaching career: 1979–present

Career history

Playing
- 1978–1979: Reno Bighorns

Coaching
- 1979–1981: Miami (Ohio) (graduate assistant)
- 1982–1984: Army (assistant)
- 1984–1989: Ohio State (assistant)
- 1989–1997: Ohio State
- 1999–2003: Philadelphia 76ers (assistant)
- 2003–2004: Philadelphia 76ers
- 2005–2007: Orlando Magic (assistant)
- 2007–2009: Washington Wizards (assistant)
- 2010–2012: New Orleans Hornets (assistant)
- 2014–2015: New Orleans Pelicans (assistant)
- 2019–present: Phoenix Suns (assistant)

Career highlights
- 2x Big Ten regular season champion (1991, 1992); AP Coach of the Year (1991); Henry Iba Award (1991); Naismith College Coach of the Year (1991); 2x Big Ten Coach of the Year (1991, 1992)
- Stats at Basketball Reference

Randall Duane Ayers (born April 16, 1956) is an American basketball coach who is currently an assistant coach (through a coaching advisor position) for the Phoenix Suns of the National Basketball Association. Ayers grew up in Springfield, Ohio and played college basketball at Miami University in Ohio. He has been a basketball coach since 1979.

He was selected in the third round of the 1978 NBA draft by the Chicago Bulls. He played one year of professional basketball for the Reno Bighorns of the World Basketball Association. In 1979, he returned to Miami as an assistant coach. After four years on the Miami staff, Ayers was an assistant at Army from 1982 to 1984.

From 1984 to 1989, Ayers was an assistant at Ohio State under Eldon Miller and Gary Williams and was promoted to head coach in 1989. In eight seasons at Ohio State, Ayers had a 124–108 record with three straight NCAA tournament appearances from 1990 to 1992. In 1991 and 1992, Ohio State won back-to-back Big Ten Conference regular season titles and top-five national finishes. However, amidst declining team performance and an ethics violation, Ayers was fired in 1997.

Since leaving Ohio State, Ayers has coached in the NBA, starting as an assistant with the Philadelphia 76ers from 1999 to 2003. Ayers was head coach for the 76ers in the 2003–04 season, the last head coaching job he would hold. Subsequently, Ayers was an assistant for the Orlando Magic from 2005 to 2007, Washington Wizards from 2007 to 2009, the New Orleans Hornets (later Pelicans) from 2010 to 2012 and 2014 to 2015, and then the Phoenix Suns beginning in 2019.

== Early life ==
Ayers was born in Springfield, Ohio, the fourth of eight children of Frank Ayers and Betty Basey. He played basketball at North High School in Springfield, where he was named Ohio high school Class AAA (big-school) player of the year in 1974.

== College career ==
Ayers attended Miami University in Oxford, Ohio, where he played basketball. Ayers made his mark more as a defender, rebounder and playmaker than as a scorer, as Miami teammates Archie Aldridge as well as Chuck Goodyear provided much of the offense. As a freshman in 1974–75, Ayers saw significant playing time, averaged 8.5 points per game (ppg) with a .560 field goal percentage as the Redskins, coached by Darrell Hedric, posted a 19–7 record. He was named honorable mention All-Mid-American Conference (MAC)

As a sophomore in 1975–76, Ayers became a starter and averaged 10.9 ppg as the team finished 18–8 and second in the MAC. He was again named honorable mention All-MAC.

As a junior in 1976–77, Ayers increased his scoring average to 12.8 ppg and 8.1 rebounds per game (rpg) as, for the third season, he was named honorable mention All-MAC. The Redskins posted an overall record of 20–6 and were MAC co-champions.

In his senior year of 1977–78, Ayers increased his scoring average for the third straight year with 13.4 ppg and had 7.0 rpg. He was named second-team All-MAC as his teammate, Archie Aldridge, earned MAC Player of the Year. Ayers was also named Miami's Defensive Player of the Year. Miami's record was 19–9 but they earned an outright MAC championship and earned a berth in the NCAA tournament. Miami opened the tournament with a thrilling 84–81 overtime win over defending national champion Marquette, a game in which Ayers had a double-double with 20 points and 10 rebounds plus three assists. In the next round they were defeated by eventual national champion Kentucky, 91–69, although Ayers had another big game with 18 points, eight rebounds and three assists.

Ayers earned a bachelor's degree in education in 1978 and master's degree in 1981, both from Miami.

== Professional playing career ==
He was drafted in the third round of the 1978 NBA draft by the Chicago Bulls, but was cut from the team and then played professionally in Reno, Nevada for the Reno Bighorns in the fledgling Western Basketball Association. Ayers earned second-team all-league honors, but the WBA folded after one season.

== Coaching career ==
=== Early coaching career (1979–1989) ===
In 1979, Ayers returned to Miami University for graduate school and became a graduate assistant for his former coach Hedric. After completing graduate school, Ayers became an assistant coach at Army, where he spent two seasons until 1983. Then from 1983 to 1991, Ayers was an assistant coach at Ohio State, first as a part-time assistant under Eldon Miller until 1986. New head coach Gary Williams retained Ayers on staff and promoted Ayers to full-time in 1987.

=== Ohio State head coach (1989–1997) ===
On July 3, 1989, Ohio State promoted Ayers to head coach after Williams left to take the head coaching job at Maryland. Ayers led Ohio State to a 17–13 record in his debut season; Ohio State lost in the second round of the 1990 NCAA tournament to eventual national champion UNLV.

The 1990–91 Ohio State Buckeyes finished 27–4 with a share of the Big Ten regular season title, the program's first conference title in 20 years. In the 1991 NCAA tournament, Ohio State advanced to the Sweet 16. After the season, Ayers was unanimously voted by peer Big Ten coaches as Big Ten Coach of the Year and won the Associated Press College Basketball Coach of the Year award. Then in 1991–92, Ohio State went 26–6, won the Big Ten title outright, and made the Elite Eight round of the 1992 NCAA tournament. This was the first time since 1964 that Ohio State won two consecutive conference titles, and would be their last conference titles in the pre-conference tournament era. Ohio State forward Jim Jackson became the fourth overall pick in the 1992 NBA draft.

Although it was not apparent at the time, Ayers' tenure had crested. Ohio State significantly regressed in 1992–93. Despite peaking at #21 in the AP Poll, Ohio State finished 15–13 and exited after the first round of the 1993 National Invitation Tournament with a loss to Miami University. The next season, Ohio State dropped to 13–16, the first losing season in 17 years.

In June 1994, the National Collegiate Athletic Association placed Ohio State on one year's probation after finding that Ayers improperly met with a high school recruit and basketball coach during a restricted time period and paid $60 to the coach. Also that year, Ohio State power forward Lawrence Funderburke was selected in the second round of the NBA draft. However, Ohio State continued to struggle with three straight losing seasons, as low as 6–22 in 1994–95.

On March 10, 1997, Ohio State athletic director Andy Geiger fired Ayers. In eight seasons, Ayers had a cumulative 124–108 record at Ohio State. On April 29 that year, Ohio State reached a nearly $637,000 settlement with Ayers to buy out the remaining two years of his contract.

=== Philadelphia 76ers assistant and head coach (1997–2004) ===
Ayers was named head coach of the Philadelphia 76ers on June 20, 2003, after serving as an assistant coach with the team since 1997. He compiled a 21–31 record during the 2003–04 season, but was fired in the middle of the season.

=== Later NBA career (2005–present) ===
He then served as an assistant coach for the Orlando Magic. On July 24, 2007, Ayers was hired as an assistant coach for the Washington Wizards. On August 5, 2009, Ayers returned to the Philadelphia 76ers to serve as an assistant coach under Eddie Jordan. Ayers then joined the coaching staff of the New Orleans Hornets (now Pelicans) in 2010, continuing his position until 2012. He returned with the Pelicans for the 2014–15 NBA season before being hired as a scout for the Brooklyn Nets on November 3, 2015.

On June 26, 2019, Ayers was hired as an assistant coach for the Phoenix Suns. On June 28, 2022, Ayers was moved to the team's coaching advisor position, which allows him to take on a smaller role with the coaching staff and spend more time with his family, as well as remain a key part of the Suns' coaching staff.

== Head coaching record ==
=== College ===
Record table
Season	Team	Overall	Conference	Standing	Postseason
Ohio State Buckeyes (Big Ten Conference) (1989–1997)
1989–90	Ohio State	17–13	10–8	6th	NCAA Division I Second Round
1990–91	Ohio State	27–4	15–3	T–1st	NCAA Division I Sweet 16
1991–92	Ohio State	26–6	15–3	1st	NCAA Division I Elite Eight
1992–93	Ohio State	15–13	8–10	7th	NIT First Round
1993–94	Ohio State	13–16	6–12	8th	
1994–95	Ohio State	6–22	2–16	10th	
1995–96	Ohio State	10–17	3–15	11th	
1996–97	Ohio State	10–17	5–13	9th	
Ohio State:		124–108 (.534)	64–80 (.444)		
Total:		124–108 (.534)			
National champion Postseason invitational champion Conference regular season champion Conference regular season and conference tournament champion Division regular season champion Division regular season and conference tournament champion Conference tournament champion

=== NBA ===
Legend
Regular season	G	Games coached	W	Games won	L	Games lost	W–L %	Win–loss %
Playoffs	PG	Playoff games	PW	Playoff wins	PL	Playoff losses	PW–L %	Playoff win–loss %

Team	Year	G	W	L	W–L%	Finish	PG	PW	PL	PW–L%	Result
Philadelphia	2003–04	52	21	31	.404	(fired)	—	—	—	—	—
Career		52	21	31	.404		—	—	—	—	

== Personal life ==
Ayers' youngest brother, Tim Ayers, served as mayor and city commissioner of Springfield, Ohio from 1984 to 1990.

Ayers married high school Spanish teacher Carol Denise Peery in 1983. They have two sons. Ryan Ayers (born July 16, 1986) played college basketball at Notre Dame and was later an assistant coach there. Cameron Ayers (born September 18, 1991) played college basketball at Bucknell University and played pro basketball.

He was inducted into the Ohio Basketball Hall of Fame in 2013.

Ayers' nephew, Carter Meadows, will play for the Michigan Wolverines football team.
