= Nathan Peavy =

Puerto Rican basketball player (born 1985)

Greensboro Swarm
- Title: Assistant coach
- League: NBA G League

Personal information
- Born: March 31, 1985 (age 41) Dayton, Ohio, U.S.
- Listed height: 6 ft 8 in (2.03 m)
- Listed weight: 227 lb (103 kg)

Career information
- High school: Chaminade-Julienne (Dayton, Ohio)
- College: Miami (Ohio) (2003–2007)
- NBA draft: 2007: undrafted
- Playing career: 2007–2017
- Position: Guard
- Coaching career: 2017–present

Career history

Playing
- 2007–2009: Paderborn Baskets
- 2009: Vaqueros de Bayamón
- 2009–2012: Artland Dragons
- 2012–2013: Alba Berlin
- 2014: Piratas de Quebradillas
- 2016: Atenienses de Manatí
- 2016–2017: Cariduros de Fajardo

Coaching
- 2017–2020: Salt Lake City Stars (assistant)
- 2020–2022: Salt Lake City Stars
- 2022–2023: Mexico City Capitanes (assistant)
- 2023–2024: Cangrejeros de Santurce
- 2024–present: Greensboro Swarm (assistant)

Career highlights
- As player: German Cup champion (2013); German Supercup champion (2013); Baloncesto Superior Nacional champion (2009)
Medals
Men's basketball
Representing Puerto Rico
Centrobasket
| Gold medal – first place | 2010 Dominican Republic |
Central American and Caribbean Games
| Gold medal – first place | 2010 Puerto Rico |

Nathan Peavy De Jesús (born March 31, 1985) is a Puerto Rican-American former professional basketball player currently working as an assistant coach for the Greensboro Swarm of the NBA G League.

As a player, Peavy worked with teams in North America and Europe, besides playing as a native in the Baloncesto Superior Nacional (BSN). In international competition, he represented Puerto Rico. A series of injuries resulted in prolonged periods of inactivity which ultimately led to his retirement.

== Early life ==
Peavy was born in Dayton, Ohio, on March 31, 1985, to Terry Peavy, a former professional basketball player drafted by the Cleveland Cavaliers in 1979, and Nila Lisa De Jesús, a former member of the Puerto Rico women's national swimming team.

== Professional career ==
From 2003 to 2007, Peavy played for the Miami (OH) Redhawk basketball team, where he averaged 11.2 points, 6.9 rebounds and .519 FG% in his final year.

In 2007, Peavy turned professional by joining the Paderborn Baskets of the German Basketball League, where he played until 2009. In 2009, Peavy signed with the Artland Dragons of the same league.

Before the beginning of the 2012–13 season, he suffered a cruciate ligament rupture during a friendly game. As a result of this injury, he did not play for ALBA Berlin this season anymore.

== Career statistics ==
=== Domestic leagues ===
| Season | Team | League | GP | MPG | FG% | 3P% | FT% | RPG | APG | SPG | BPG | PPG |
|---|---|---|---|---|---|---|---|---|---|---|---|---|
| 2007–08 | Digibu Baskets | German BBL | 34 | 22.0 | .509 | .478 | .630 | 3.8 | .5 | .6 | .5 | 9.4 |
| 2008–09 | Digibu Baskets | German BBL | 28 | 28.3 | .513 | .393 | .712 | 5.1 | .9 | .8 | .3 | 13.9 |
| 2009 | Vaqueros de Bayamón | BSN | 27 | 20.0 | .513 | .405 | .787 | 4.1 | 1.3 | .5 | .6 | 10.0 |
| 2009–10 | Artland Dragons | German BBL | 34 | 24.3 | .573 | .447 | .669 | 3.9 | 1.2 | .4 | .3 | 11.2 |
| 2010–11 | Artland Dragons | German BBL | 33 | 23.9 | .514 | .381 | .722 | 5.2 | 1.0 | .4 | .5 | 10.8 |
| 2011 | Vaqueros de Bayamón | BSN | 7 | 25.6 | .571 | .375 | .811 | 4.7 | 1.6 | .6 | 1.9 | 13.7 |
| 2011–12 | Artland Dragons | German BBL | 40 | 26.7 | .565 | .434 | .749 | 6.3 | 1.7 | .4 | .5 | 13.8 |

== See also ==
- List of Puerto Ricans
