= 1983–84 Miami Redskins men's basketball team =

American college basketball season

1983–84 Miami Redskins men's basketball

MAC Regular season champion MAC tournament champion

NCAA tournament
- Conference: Mid-American Conference
- Record: 24–6 (16–2 MAC)
- Head coach: Darrell Hedric (14th season)
- Home arena: Millett Hall

1983–84 Mid-American Conference men's basketball standings
	Conf.				Overall
Team	W		L	PCT	W		L	PCT
Miami†	16	–	2	.889	24	–	6	.800
Ohio	14	–	4	.778	20	–	8	.714
Bowling Green	11	–	7	.611	18	–	10	.643
Toledo	11	–	7	.611	18	–	11	.621
Northern Illinois	9	–	9	.500	12	–	15	.444
Eastern Michigan	8	–	10	.444	12	–	17	.414
Kent State	8	–	10	.444	15	–	14	.517
Central Michigan	6	–	12	.333	11	–	16	.407
Ball State	5	–	13	.278	8	–	19	.296
Western Michigan	2	–	16	.111	4	–	22	.154
† Mid-American Conference tournament winner Rankings from AP Poll

The 1983–84 Miami Redskins men's basketball team represent Miami University in the 1983–84 NCAA Division I men's basketball season. The Redskins, led by 14th-year head coach Darrell Hedric, played their home games at Millett Hall in Oxford, Ohio as members of the Mid-American Conference. The team finished atop the conference regular season standings, and followed that success by winning the MAC tournament to earn an automatic bid to the NCAA tournament. As the No. 8 seed in the West region, Miami was beaten by No. 9 seed SMU in the opening round, 83–69.

== Roster ==
1983–84 Miami RedHawks men's basketball team
Players
Coaches

Pos.	#	Name	Height	Weight	Year	Hometown
F	34	Ron Harper	6 ft 6 in (1.98 m)	195 lb (88 kg)	So	Dayton, Ohio
F		Chuck Dahn	6 ft 7 in (2.01 m)	—	Sr
C		Rusty Doyle	6 ft 8 in (2.03 m)	—	Fr
F		Mike Hall	6 ft 6 in (1.98 m)	—	Fr
F		Ron Hunter	6 ft 4 in (1.93 m)	—	So	Dayton, Ohio
F		Tony Lehman	6 ft 7 in (2.01 m)	—	Sr
F		Billy Lewis	6 ft 2 in (1.88 m)	—	Sr
C		Jim Manuel	7 ft 0 in (2.13 m)	—	Sr
C		John Marx	6 ft 10 in (2.08 m)	—	Sr
G		Eric Newsome	5 ft 8 in (1.73 m)	—	Fr
G		Chuck Stahl	6 ft 4 in (1.93 m)	—	Sr
F		Stepfon Sudduth	6 ft 6 in (1.98 m)	—	So
G		John Willoughby	6 ft 1 in (1.85 m)	—	Sr

Head coach

- Darrell Hedric (Miami (OH))

Assistant coach(es)

Legend

- (C) Team captain
- (S) Suspended
- (I) Ineligible
- (W) Walk-on
- Injured
- Current redshirt

== Schedule and results ==
Date time, TV	Rank^{#}	Opponent^{#}	Result	Record	Site (attendance) city, state
Non-conference regular season
Nov 26, 1983*		at No. 19 Indiana	W 63–57	1–0	Assembly Hall; Bloomington, Indiana
Dec 3, 1983*		Purdue	L 58–67	1–1	Millett Hall; Oxford, Ohio
Dec 7, 1983*		Dayton	W 67–59	2–1	Millett Hall; Oxford, Ohio
Dec 10, 1983*		Xavier	W 72–53	3–1	Millett Hall; Oxford, Ohio
Dec 17, 1983*		at Cincinnati	W 55–50	4–1	Riverfront Coliseum; Cincinnati, Ohio
Dec 27, 1983*		vs. Davidson	W 70–52	5–1	MECCA Arena; Milwaukee, Wisconsin
Dec 28, 1983*		at Marquette	L 47–59	5–2	MECCA Arena; Milwaukee, Wisconsin
Jan 2, 1984*		at Dayton	L 79–89	5–3	University of Dayton Arena; Dayton, Ohio
MAC regular season
Jan 4, 1984		at Eastern Michigan	W 50–48	6–3 (1–0)	Bowen Field House; Ypsilanti, Michigan
Jan 7, 1984		at Western Michigan	W 70–67	7–3 (2–0)	University Arena; Kalamazoo, Michigan
Mar 5, 1984		at Ball State	W 85–76	21–5 (16–2)	Irving Gymnasium; Muncie, Indiana
MAC tournament
Mar 8, 1984*		vs. Ball State; Quarterfinals	W 85–76	22–5	Rockford MetroCentre; Rockford, Illinois
Mar 9, 1984*		vs. Toledo; Semifinals	W 51–46	23–5	Rockford MetroCentre; Rockford, Illinois
Mar 10, 1984*		vs. Kent State; Championship game	W 42–40	24–5	Rockford MetroCentre; Rockford, Illinois
NCAA tournament
Mar 16, 1984*	(9 W)	vs. (8 W) SMU; First round	L 69–83	24–6	Friel Court; Pullman, Washington
*Non-conference game. ^{#}Rankings from AP Poll. (#) Tournament seedings in parentheses. W=West. All times are in Eastern Time.
