= Salt Lake City Stars =

American professional basketball team of the NBA G League

- Conference: Western
- League: NBA G League
- Founded: 1997
- History: Idaho Stampede; 1997–2016; CBA: 1997–2006; NBA D-League: 2006–2016; Salt Lake City Stars; NBA D-League/G League: 2016–present
- Arena: Maverik Center
- Location: West Valley City, Utah
- Team colors: Mountain purple, sky blue, midnight black
- Head coach: Rick Higgins
- Ownership: Utah Jazz
- Affiliation: Utah Jazz
- Championships: 1 (2008)
- Conference titles: CBA: 1 (2001); D-League/G League: 2 (2007, 2008)
- Division titles: 2 (2007, 2008)
- Showcase Cup titles: 2 (2019, 2025)
- Website: saltlakecity.gleague.nba.com

The Salt Lake City Stars are an American professional basketball team in the NBA G League based in West Valley City, Utah. They are affiliated with the Utah Jazz, and play their home games at the Maverik Center. Before the 2016–17 season, they were based in Boise, Idaho, and were known as the Idaho Stampede.

== History ==
=== Idaho Stampede ===
The Stampede's sole NBA affiliate was the Utah Jazz, with whom they originally had a hybrid partnership. However, on March 24, 2015, the Utah Jazz and the Idaho Stampede announced that the Jazz had purchased the Stampede, becoming the 8th NBA team to become owners of their D-League affiliate.

They also had past affiliations with the Denver Nuggets, Seattle SuperSonics, Toronto Raptors and most recently the Portland Trail Blazers, with the Jazz taking sole affiliation after the 2013–2014 season.

During the 2007–08 season, the Stampede set a D-League record for longest winning streak with 18 consecutive wins between December 18, 2007 & February 7, 2008.

=== Salt Lake City ===
The first logo as the Salt Lake City Stars, used from 2016 to 2025.

The team was purchased by the Jazz on March 24, 2015, and signed a one-year lease at CenturyLink Arena. Shortly after the Jazz bought the Stampede, rumors abounded about the team's relocation to Orem, Utah to be closer to the parent club; coincidentally, Orem was home to the D-League's Utah Flash from 2007 until 2011 (the team now plays in Wilmington, Delaware as the Delaware Blue Coats). These rumors were not far off, as on April 4, 2016, the Utah Jazz and the D-League announced that the Stampede would relocate to Salt Lake City for the 2016–17 season and would be renamed the Salt Lake City Stars.

On October 10, 2022, it was announced that the team would move to the Maverik Center for the 2022–2023 season.

In 2025, the Stars conducted a rebranding that included a new logo and new uniforms based on the original uniforms of the Utah Stars of the American Basketball Association.

== Season-by-season ==
Season	League	Conference/Division	Head coach	Standing	W	L	%	Postseason
Idaho Stampede
1997–98	CBA	National	Bobby Dye	4th	25	31	.446	Lost First Round (Fort Wayne) 2–3
1998–99	CBA	National	Russ Bergman	4th	25	31	.446	Lost First Round (Sioux Falls) 2–3
1999–2000	CBA	National	Russ Bergman (9–17); Rory White (10–20)	5th	19	37	.339	
2000–01 (Note: Due to financial problems, the CBA temporarily folded, effectively ending the season.)	CBA	National	Rory White	1st	17	7	.708	
2001–02 (Note: Due to financial problems relating to the CBA, the Idaho Stampede were forced to not play for a season at all during this period of time.)	Did not play							
2002–03	CBA	National	Rory White	3rd	17	31	.354	
2003–04	CBA		Larry Krystkowiak	2nd	34	14	.708	Won Semifinals (Gary) 3–1; Lost CBA Finals (Dakota) 129–132
2004–05	CBA	Western	Joe Wolf	3rd	23	25	.479	
2005–06	CBA	Western	Joe Wolf	3rd	25	23	.521	Lost Round-Robin Tournament 1–2
2006–07	D-League	Western	Bryan Gates	1st	33	17	.660	Lost Semifinals (Colorado) 91–94 (OT)
2007–08	D-League	Western	Bryan Gates	1st	36	14	.720	Won Semifinals (Los Angeles) 97–90; Won D-League Finals (Austin) 2–1
2008–09	D-League	Western	Bryan Gates	2nd	31	19	.620	Lost First Round (Austin) 116–119 (OT)
2009–10	D-League	Western	Bob MacKinnon	6th	25	25	.500	
2010–11	D-League	Western	Randy Livingston	7th	24	26	.480	
2011–12	D-League	Western	Randy Livingston	8th	21	29	.420	
2012–13	D-League	Western	Mike Peck	4th	19	31	.380	
2013–14	D-League	Western	Mike Peck	4th	24	26	.480	
2014–15	D-League	Western	Dean Cooper	5th	9	41	.180	
2015–16	D-League	Western/Pacific	Dean Cooper	4th	20	30	.400	
Salt Lake City Stars
2016–17	D-League	Western	Dean Cooper	5th	14	36	.280	
2017–18	G League	Southwest	Martin Schiller	4th	16	34	.320	
2018–19	G League	Southwest	Martin Schiller	2nd	27	23	.540	Lost First Round (Oklahoma City) 113–118
2019–20	G League	Southwest	Martin Schiller	1st	30	12	.714	Season cancelled by COVID-19 pandemic
2020–21	G League	—	Nathan Peavy	17th	4	11	.267	
2021–22	G League	Western	Nathan Peavy	13th	9	23	.281	
2022–23	G League	Western	Scott Morrison	4th	20	12	.625	Lost Quarterfinals (Sioux Falls) 107–115
2023–24	G League	Western	Steve Wojciechowski	5th	20	14	.588	Lost Quarterfinals (Santa Cruz) 111–113
2024–25	G League	Western	Steve Wojciechowski	3rd	21	13	.618	Won Quarterfinals (Rio Grande Valley) 129–102; Lost Conference Semifinal (Austin) 113–123
Regular season total					602	635	.487	1997–present
Playoffs total					12	17	.414	1997–present

== Current roster ==
Salt Lake City Stars roster
Players

Pos.	No.	Player	Height	Weight	DOB	From
G	–	Trey Alexander (TW)	6 ft 5 in (1.96 m)	185 lb (84 kg)	2003-05-02	Creighton
G	–	Tamar Bates (TW)	6 ft 4 in (1.93 m)	195 lb (88 kg)	2003-02-21	Missouri
C	21	Steven Crowl	6 ft 10 in (2.08 m)	247 lb (112 kg)	2001-07-01	Wisconsin
G	4	Justin Harmon	6 ft 4 in (1.93 m)	180 lb (82 kg)	2001-08-30	Illinois
F	42	Blake Hinson (TW)	6 ft 8 in (2.03 m)	230 lb (104 kg)	1999-12-26	Pittsburgh

Coaches
Head coach
- Rick Higgins
Assistant(s)
- Isaiah Fox
- James Mays
- Brenden Morris
- Jia Perkins
- Brandon Robinson
- Ryan Toolson

Legend
- (DP) Unsigned draft pick
- (FA) Free agent
- (S) Suspended
- (P) Prospects
- (NBA) On assignment from NBA affiliate
- (TW) Two-way affiliate player
- Injured

Roster
Updated: March 6, 2026

== Head coaches ==
Head coach	Term	Regular season				Playoffs				Achievements
Head coach	Term	G	W	L	Win%	G	W	L	Win%	Achievements
Rick Higgins	2025–present				–				–	

== NBA affiliates ==
=== Idaho Stampede ===
- Denver Nuggets (2009–2012)
- Portland Trail Blazers (2007–2014)
- Seattle SuperSonics (2006–2008)
- Toronto Raptors (2008–2009)
- Utah Jazz (2006–2007, 2011–2012, 2014–2016)

=== Salt Lake City Stars ===
- Utah Jazz (2016–present)
