= 1991–92 Ohio Bobcats men's basketball team =

American college basketball season

1991–92 Ohio Bobcats men's basketball
- Conference: Mid-American Conference
- Record: 18–10 (10–6 MAC)
- Head coach: Larry Hunter (3rd season)
- Assistant coaches: David Greer; Mike Elfers
- Home arena: Convocation Center

1991–92 Mid-American Conference men's basketball standings
	Conf.				Overall
Team	W		L	PCT	W		L	PCT
Miami (OH) †	13	–	3	.813	23	–	8	.742
Ball State	11	–	5	.688	24	–	9	.727
Western Michigan	11	–	5	.688	21	–	9	.700
Ohio	10	–	6	.625	18	–	10	.643
Bowling Green	8	–	8	.500	14	–	15	.483
Kent State	6	–	10	.375	9	–	19	.321
Central Michigan	6	–	10	.375	12	–	16	.429
Eastern Michigan	4	–	12	.250	9	–	22	.290
Toledo	3	–	13	.188	7	–	20	.259
† 1992 MAC tournament winner Rankings from AP Poll

The 1991–92 Ohio Bobcats men's basketball team represented Ohio University in the college basketball season of 1991–92. The team was coached by Larry Hunter and played their home games at the Convocation Center. They finished the season 18–10 and finished fourth in the MAC regular season with a conference record of 10–6.

== Roster ==
1991–92 Ohio Bobcats men's basketball team
Players
Coaches

Pos.	#	Name	Height	Weight	Year	Hometown
F	41	Dan Aloi	6 ft 7 in (2.01 m)	225 lb (102 kg)	Sr	Ellwood City, PA
G	24	Tom Jamerson	6 ft 4 in (1.93 m)	210 lb (95 kg)	Sr	Cuyahoga Falls, OH
G	23	Nate Craig	6 ft 0 in (1.83 m)	175 lb (79 kg)	Sr	Dayton, OH
F	33	Lewis Geter	6 ft 8 in (2.03 m)	190 lb (86 kg)	Sr	Columbus, OH
G	10	Dedrick Jenkins	5 ft 10 in (1.78 m)	150 lb (68 kg)	Sr	Waterloo, IA
C	44	Robert Stark	6 ft 9 in (2.06 m)	235 lb (107 kg)	Sr	Sumter, SC
G	12	Jay Barry	6 ft 2 in (1.88 m)	170 lb (77 kg)	Jr	Oxford, OH
F	20	Chad Gill	6 ft 6 in (1.98 m)	180 lb (82 kg)	Jr	Columbus, OH
C	31	Aaron Quinn	6 ft 9 in (2.06 m)	250 lb (113 kg)	So	Cambridge, OH
G	4	Chad Estis	6 ft 0 in (1.83 m)	185 lb (84 kg)	So	Aurora, OH
G	15	Alonzo Motley	6 ft 4 in (1.93 m)	200 lb (91 kg)	So	Dayton, OH
G	22	Rush Floyd	6 ft 1 in (1.85 m)	185 lb (84 kg)	So	Pickerington, OH
F	--	Frank Zielinski	6 ft 7 in (2.01 m)	195 lb (88 kg)	So	Birmingham, MI
F	45	Jeff Boals	6 ft 7 in (2.01 m)	240 lb (109 kg)	Fr	Magnolia, OH
F	43	Ryan Greenwood	6 ft 7 in (2.01 m)	215 lb (98 kg)	Fr	Indianapolis, IN
F	3	Steve Ehretsman	6 ft 6 in (1.98 m)	205 lb (93 kg)	Fr	Cleveland, OH
G	23	Mike Reese	6 ft 2 in (1.88 m)	190 lb (86 kg)	Fr	Hamilton, OH

Head coach

- Larry Hunter

Assistant coach(es)

- David Greer
- Mike Elfers

Legend

- (C) Team captain
- (S) Suspended
- (I) Ineligible
- (W) Walk-on
- Injured
- Current redshirt

== Schedule ==
Date time, TV	Rank^{#}	Opponent^{#}	Result	Record	Site (attendance) city, state
Non-conference regular season
11/30/1991*		at Youngstown State	W 72–62	1–0	
12/4/1991*		at No. 4 Ohio State	L 62–78	1–1	St. John Arena; Columbus, Ohio
12/9/1991*		Charleston (WV)	W 79–62	2–1	
12/12/1991*		Robert Morris	W 78–67	3–1	Convocation Center (1,471); Athens, Ohio
12/14/1991*		Marshall	W 75–64	4–1	
12/17/1991*		Colorado State	W 70–54	5–1	
12/20/1991*		Rollins	W 71–49	6–1	
12/23/1991*		vs. No. 17 Kentucky	L 63–73	6–2	Riverfront Coliseum; Cincinnati, Ohio
12/27/1991*		vs. Appalachian State; Cowboy Classic	W 92–76	7–2	
12/28/1991*		at Wyoming; Cowboy Classic	L 65–70 ^{OT}	7–3	
1/2/1992*		at Wright State	W 87–71	8–3	
MAC regular season
1/8/1992		at Bowling Green	W 85–68	9–3 (1–0)	
1/11/1992		Eastern Michigan	W 85–67	10–3 (2–0)	
1/15/1992		at Toledo	L 66–70	10–4 (2–1)	
1/18/1992		Kent State	W 72–60	11–4 (3–1)	
1/22/1992		at Ball State	L 60–76	11–5 (3–2)	
1/25/1992		Miami (OH)	L 86–91 ^{3OT}	11–6 (3–3)	Convocation Center; Athens, Ohio
1/29/1992		at Western Michigan	L 75–84	11–7 (3–4)	
2/5/1992		Central Michigan	W 81–52	12–7 (4–4)	
2/71992		at Eastern Michigan	W 73–58	13–7 (5–4)	
2/12/1992		Toledo	W 61–45	14–7 (6–4)	
2/15/1992		at Kent State	W 60–55	15–7 (7–4)	
2/19/1992		Ball State	W 73–70 ^{OT}	16–7 (8–4)	
2/22/1992		at Miami (OH)	L 64–72	16–8 (8–5)	Millett Hall; Oxford, Ohio
2/25/1992		Western Michigan	W 82–81 ^{OT}	17–8 (9–5)	
3/4/1992		at Central Michigan	L 62–71	17–9 (9–6)	
3/7/1992		Bowling Green	W 61–55	18–9 (10–6)	
MAC tournament
3/13/1992	(4)	vs. (5) Bowling Green; Quarterfinal	L 46–54	18–10 (10–7)	Cobo Arena; Detroit, Michigan
*Non-conference game. ^{#}Rankings from AP Poll. (#) Tournament seedings in parentheses. All times are in Eastern Time.

== Statistics ==
=== Team statistics ===
Final 1991–92 statistics

Record	Ohio	OPP
Scoring	1989	1854
Scoring Average	71.04	66.21
Field goals – Att	687–1549	624–1448
3-pt. Field goals – Att	157–430	127–368
Free throws – Att	458–620	479–709
Rebounds	981	900
Assists	398	343
Turnovers	350	364
Steals	157	172
Blocked Shots	48	69

=== Player statistics ===
			Minutes		Scoring		Total FGs			3-point FGs			Free-Throws			Rebounds								
Player	GP	GS	Tot	Avg	Pts	Avg	FG	FGA	Pct	3FG	3FA	Pct	FT	FTA	Pct	Off	Def	Tot	Avg	A	PF	TO	Stl	Blk
Lewis Geter	28	27	996	35.6	584	20.9	193	425	0.454	23	74	0.311	175	220	0.795	-	-	236	8.4	95	79	77	37	17
Dan Aloi	28	28	923	33.0	409	14.6	144	308	0.468	49	126	0.389	72	85	0.847	-	-	113	4.0	30	79	38	9	3
Nate Craig	28	26	926	33.1	220	7.9	86	202	0.426	21	64	0.328	27	49	0.551	-	-	120	4.3	125	69	59	38	1
Ryan Greenwood	28	5	525	18.8	171	6.1	62	127	0.488	0	0	0.000	47	63	0.746	-	-	105	3.8	27	83	42	11	9
Rush Floyd	27	16	531	19.7	141	5.2	44	106	0.415	31	70	0.443	22	26	0.846	-	-	54	2.0	25	58	21	16	1
Dedrick Jenkins	27	12	492	18.2	115	4.3	34	91	0.374	19	52	0.365	28	39	0.718	-	-	47	1.7	37	43	23	13	0
Steve Ehretsman	28	2	297	10.6	86	3.1	34	79	0.430	10	26	0.385	8	14	0.571	-	-	32	1.1	7	24	19	8	3
Chad Gill	28	1	319	11.4	84	3.0	26	48	0.542	0	2	0.000	32	49	0.653	-	-	56	2.0	18	50	13	10	5
Robert Stark	27	21	387	14.3	83	3.1	31	65	0.477	0	0	0.000	21	33	0.636	-	-	45	1.7	13	61	26	4	7
Alonzo Motley	14	0	92	6.6	32	2.3	13	31	0.419	0	0	0.000	6	10	0.600	-	-	17	1.2	8	11	6	1	1
Tom Jamerson	25	2	158	6.3	26	1.0	8	28	0.286	2	9	0.222	8	16	0.500	-	-	27	1.1	11	18	7	4	0
Jay Barry	12	0	16	1.3	11	0.9	4	10	0.400	1	3	0.333	2	2	1.000	-	-	2	0.2	0	0	0	1	0
Chad Estis	14	0	23	1.6	10	0.7	3	11	0.273	1	4	0.250	3	4	0.750	-	-	4	0.3	0	3	1	2	0
Mike Reese	13	0	34	2.6	9	0.7	2	9	0.222	0	0	0.000	5	6	0.833	-	-	9	0.7	1	3	11	0	1
Jeff Boals	13	0	39	3.0	8	0.6	3	9	0.333	0	0	0.000	2	4	0.500	-	-	15	1.2	1	7	4	3	0
Total	28	-	-	-	1989	71.0	687	1549	0.444	157	430	0.365	458	620	0.739	0	0	981	35.0	398	588	350	157	48
Opponents	28	-	-	-	1854	66.2	624	1448	0.431	127	368	0.345	479	709	0.676			900	32.1	343	560	364	172	69

Legend
GP	Games played	GS	Games started	Avg	Average per game
FG	Field-goals made	FGA	Field-goal attempts	Off	Offensive rebounds
Def	Defensive rebounds	A	Assists	TO	Turnovers
Blk	Blocks	Stl	Steals	High	Team high
