= 1994–95 Ball State Cardinals men's basketball team =

American college basketball season

1994–95 Ball State Cardinals men's basketball

MAC tournament champions

NCAA tournament, first round
- Conference: Mid-American Conference
- Record: 19–11 (11–7 MAC)
- Head coach: Ray McCallum (2nd season)
- Assistant coach: Tim Buckley
- Home arena: Worthen Arena

1994–95 Mid-American Conference men's basketball standings
	Conf.				Overall
Team	W		L	PCT	W		L	PCT
Miami	16	–	2	.889	23	–	7	.767
Ohio	13	–	5	.722	24	–	10	.706
Eastern Michigan	12	–	6	.667	20	–	10	.667
Ball State †	11	–	7	.611	19	–	11	.633
Bowling Green	10	–	8	.556	16	–	11	.593
Toledo	10	–	8	.556	16	–	11	.593
Western Michigan	9	–	9	.500	14	–	13	.519
Kent State	5	–	13	.278	8	–	19	.296
Akron	4	–	14	.222	8	–	18	.308
Central Michigan	0	–	18	.000	3	–	23	.115
† 1995 MAC tournament winner Rankings from AP Poll

The 1994–95 Ball State Cardinals men's basketball team represented Ball State University in the 1994–95 NCAA Division I men's basketball season. The team was led by second-year head coach Ray McCallum and played their home games at Worthen Arena in Muncie, Indiana as a member of the Mid-American Conference. They finished the season 19–11, 11–7 in MAC play to finish in fourth place. They defeated Bowling Green State, Miami (OH), and Eastern Michigan to win the MAC tournament championship. As a result, they received the conference's automatic bid to the NCAA tournament as the No. 12 seed in the Southeast region. There they lost to Arizona State in the first round.

== Previous season ==
The Cardinals finished the 1993–94 season 16–12, 11–7 in MAC play to finish in fourth place. They defeated Toledo in the quarterfinals of the MAC tournament before losing to Ohio in semifinals.

== Roster ==
1994–95 Ball State Cardinals men's basketball team
Players
Coaches

Pos.	#	Name	Height	Weight	Year	Previous school	Hometown
F	42	Bonzi Wells	6 ft 5 in (1.96 m)	200 lb (91 kg)	Fr	Muncie Central	Muncie, Indiana
F	3	Antwann Jones	6 ft 5 in (1.96 m)	203 lb (92 kg)	Fr	Sexton	Lansing, Michigan
G	11	Randy Zachary	5 ft 10 in (1.78 m)	164 lb (74 kg)	So	Highland	Anderson, Indiana
F	21	Charles Smith	6 ft 3 in (1.91 m)	174 lb (79 kg)	Fr	Bishop Borgess	Detroit, Michigan
G	23	LaSalle Thompson	5 ft 11 in (1.8 m)	175 lb (79 kg)	Jr	Pike	Indianapolis, Indiana
G	25	Marcu Norris	6 ft 1 in (1.85 m)	190 lb (86 kg)	Jr	Jackson	Jackson, Michigan
F	30	DeWayne Rogers	6 ft 5 in (1.96 m)	200 lb (91 kg)	Jr	Butler	Louisville, Kentucky
C	44	Mike Deaton	6 ft 8 in (2.03 m)	240 lb (109 kg)	Sr	Jennings County	North Vernon, Indiana
C	45	Ryan Reed	6 ft 9 in (2.06 m)	210 lb (95 kg)	Fr	Central	Greenfield, Indiana
G	--	Kevin Johnson	5 ft 10 in (1.78 m)	207 lb (94 kg)	Sr	Franklin Central	Indianapolis, Indiana
F	--	Jason Sheets` (W)	6 ft 5 in (1.96 m)	195 lb (88 kg)	So	Carroll	Fort Wayne, Indiana
C	4	Amos Gregory	6 ft 9 in (2.06 m)	260 lb (118 kg)	Sr	Glencliff	Nashville, Tennessee
F	34	Steve Payne	6 ft 8 in (2.03 m)	228 lb (103 kg)	Sr	Shepard	Calumet Park, Illinois

Head coach

- Ray McCallum (Weber State)

Assistant coach(es)

- Tim Buckley
- Leonard Drake
- Ron Hecklinski (part time)

Legend

- (C) Team captain
- (S) Suspended
- (I) Ineligible
- (W) Walk-on
- Injured
- Current redshirt

Roster

== Schedule and results ==
Date time, TV	Rank^{#}	Opponent^{#}	Result	Record	Site city, state
Non-conference regular season
Nov 28, 1994*		Lynn	W 111–79	1–0	Worthen Arena; Muncie, Indiana
Dec 2, 1994*		Trine	W 98–56	2–0	Worthen Arena; Muncie, Indiana
Dec 4, 1994*		Auburn	W 82–74	3–0	Worthen Arena; Muncie, Indiana
Dec 5, 1994*		Western Kentucky	L 77–84	3–1	Worthen Arena; Muncie, Indiana
Dec 10, 1994*		at Butler	W 85–77	4–1	Hinkle Fieldhouse; Indianapolis, Indiana
Dec 22, 1994*		Indiana State	W 88–80	5–1	Worthen Arena; Muncie, Indiana
Dec 29, 1994*		at No. 15 Michigan State; Oldsmobile Spartan Classic	L 95–117	5–2	Breslin Center; East Lansing, Michigan
Dec 30, 1994*		vs. Coppin State; Oldsmobile Spartan Classic	L 75–76	5–3	Breslin Center; East Lansing, Michigan
MAC regular season
Jan 4, 1995		at Ohio	L 59–65	5–4 (0–1)	Convocation Center; Athens, Ohio
Jan 7, 1995		Toledo	W 62–51	6–4 (1–1)	Worthen Arena; Muncie, Indiana
Jan 11, 1995		at Akron	L 71–74	6–5 (1–2)	James A. Rhodes Arena; Akron, Ohio
Jan 14, 1995		Western Michigan	W 86–70	7–5 (2–2)	Worthen Arena; Muncie, Indiana
Jan 18, 1995		at Central Michigan	W 85–68	8–5 (3–2)	Rose Arena; Mount Pleasant, Michigan
Jan 21, 1995		Eastern Michigan	W 67–63	9–5 (4–2)	Worthen Arena; Muncie, Indiana
Jan 25, 1995		at Bowling Green State	L 73–88	9–6 (4–3)	Anderson Arena; Bowling Green, Ohio
Jan 28, 1995		at Miami (OH)	L 62–77	9–7 (4–4)	Millett Hall; Oxford, Ohio
Feb 1, 1995		Kent State	W 81–58	10–7 (5–4)	Worthen Arena; Muncie, Indiana
Feb 4, 1995		at Toledo	L 62–82	10–8 (5–5)	John F. Savage Hall; Toledo, Ohio
Feb 8, 1995		Akron	W 72–68	11–8 (6–5)	Worthen Arena; Muncie, Indiana
Feb 11, 1995		at Western Michigan	W 77–72	12–8 (7–5)	University Arena; Kalamazoo, Michigan
Feb 15, 1995		Central Michigan	W 84–54	13–8 (8–5)	Worthen Arena; Muncie, Indiana
Feb 18, 1995		at Eastern Michigan	L 72–75	13–9 (8–6)	Bowen Field House; Ypsilanti, Michigan
Feb 22, 1995		Bowling Green State	W 97–71	14–9 (9–6)	Worthen Arena; Muncie, Indiana
Feb 25, 1995		Miami (OH)	W 61–57 ^{OT}	15–9 (10–6)	Worthen Arena; Muncie, Indiana
Mar 1, 1995		at Kent State	L 75–92	15–10 (10–7)	Memorial Athletic and Convocation Center; Kent, Ohio
Mar 4, 1995		Ohio	W 96–85	16–10 (11–7)	Worthen Arena; Muncie, Indiana
MAC tournament
Mar 7, 1995*		Bowling Green State; Quarterfinals	W 72–58	17–10	Worthen Arena; Muncie, Indiana
Mar 10, 1995*		vs. Miami (OH); Semifinals	W 66–61	18–10	John F. Savage Hall; Toledo, Ohio
Mar 11, 1995*		vs. Eastern Michigan; Championship game	W 77–70	19–10	John F. Savage Hall; Toledo, Ohio
NCAA tournament
Mar 16, 1995*	(12 SE)	vs. (5 SE) No. 16 Arizona State; First round	L 66–81	19–11	Pyramid Arena; Memphis, Tennessee
*Non-conference game. ^{#}Rankings from AP poll. (#) Tournament seedings in parentheses. All times are in Eastern Time Sources.
