= 1977–78 Ohio Bobcats men's basketball team =

American college basketball season

1977–78 Ohio Bobcats men's basketball
- Conference: Mid-American Conference
- Record: 13–14 (6–10 MAC)
- Head coach: Dale Bandy (4th season)
- Assistant coach: Bill Brown (4th season)
- Home arena: Convocation Center

1977–78 Mid-American Conference men's basketball standings
	Conf.				Overall
Team	W		L	PCT	W		L	PCT
No. 19 Miami (Ohio)	12	–	4	.750	19	–	9	.679
Toledo	11	–	5	.688	21	–	6	.778
Central Michigan	11	–	5	.688	16	–	10	.615
Bowling Green State	10	–	6	.625	12	–	15	.444
Northern Illinois	9	–	7	.563	11	–	16	.407
Eastern Michigan	7	–	9	.438	11	–	16	.407
Ohio	6	–	10	.375	13	–	14	.481
Ball State	6	–	10	.375	10	–	15	.400
Western Michigan	4	–	12	.250	7	–	20	.259
Kent State	4	–	12	.250	6	–	21	.222
Rankings from AP Poll

The 1977–78 Ohio Bobcats men's basketball team represented Ohio University as a member of the Mid-American Conference in the college basketball season of 1977–78. The team was coached by Dale Bandy in his fourth season at Ohio. They played their home games at Convocation Center. The Bobcats finished with a record of 13–14 and seventh in the MAC regular season with a conference record of 6–10.

== Schedule ==
Date time, TV	Rank^{#}	Opponent^{#}	Result	Record	Site (attendance) city, state
Regular Season
11/25/1977*		vs. Rhode Island; IPTAY Invitational	L 69–81	0–1	Littlejohn Coliseum; Clemson, South Carolina
11/26/1977*		vs. TCU; IPTAY Invitational	W 78–64	1–1	Littlejohn Coliseum; Clemson, South Carolina
12/1/1977*		Cleveland State	W 79–66	2–1	Convocation Center; Athens, Ohio
12/5/1977*		Youngstown State	W 67–64	3–1	Convocation Center; Athens, Ohio
12/7/1977*		Marietta	W 73–69	4–1	Convocation Center; Athens, Ohio
12/10/1977		Northern Illinois	L 76–80	4–2 (0–1)	Convocation Center; Athens, Ohio
12/16/1977*		vs. Grambling; Cajun Classic	W 60–53	5–2	
12/17/1977*		vs. Louisiana; Cajun Classic	L 81–98	5–3	
12/20/1977*		at SMU	L 77–83	5–4	
MAC regular season
1/4/1978		at Kent State	W 73–59	6–4 (1–1)	Memorial Athletic and Convocation Center; Kent, Ohio
1/7/1978		Ball State	W 75–71	7–4 (2–1)	Convocation Center; Athens, Ohio
1/11/1978*		Marshall	W 68–56	8–4	Convocation Center; Athens, Ohio
1/14/1978		at Miami (OH)	L 77–90	8–5 (2–2)	Millett Hall; Oxford, Ohio
1/18/1978		Western Michigan	L 59–73	8-6 (2-3)	Convocation Center; Athens, Ohio
1/25/1978		at Central Michigan	L 71–77	8-7 (2-4)	Daniel P. Rose Center; Mount Pleasant, Michigan
2/1/1978*		Loyola (IL)	W 86–80 ^{OT}	9–7	Convocation Center; Athens, Ohio
2/4/1978		at Toledo	W 72–71	10–7 (3–4)	Centennial Hall; Toledo, Ohio
2/6/1978		at Bowling Green	L 66–68	10–8 (3–5)	Anderson Arena; Bowling Green, Ohio
2/8/1978		Kent State	W 68–54	11–8 (4–5)	Convocation Center; Athens, Ohio
2/11/1978		at Ball State	L 77–82	11–9 (4–6)	Irving Gymnasium; Muncie, Indiana
2/15/1978*		at Virginia Tech	L 83–105	11–10	
2/18/1978		Miami (OH)	L 66–70	11–11 (4–7)	Convocation Center; Athens, Ohio
2/20/1978		Eastern Michigan	W 66–62	12–11 (5–7)	Convocation Center; Athens, Ohio
2/22/1978		at Western Michigan	L 82–88	12–12 (5–8)	Read Fieldhouse; Kalamazoo, Michigan
2/25/1978		Bowling Green	L 76–90	12–13 (5–9)	Convocation Center; Athens, Ohio
3/1/1978		Central Michigan	W 105–94	13–13 (6–9)	Convocation Center; Athens, Ohio
3/4/1978		at Northern Illinois	L 70–76	13–14 (6–10)	
*Non-conference game. ^{#}Rankings from AP Poll. (#) Tournament seedings in parentheses. All times are in Eastern Time.

== Statistics ==
=== Team statistics ===
Final 1977–78 statistics

Record	Ohio	OPP
Scoring	2000	2024
Scoring Average	74.07	74.96
Field goals – Att	785–1707	810–1765
Free throws – Att	430–610	402–571
Rebounds	1082	1101
Assists	387	353
Turnovers		
Steals	156	150
Blocked Shots	64	64

=== Player statistics ===
			Minutes		Scoring		Total FGs			Free-Throws			Rebounds						
Player	GP	GS	Tot	Avg	Pts	Avg	FG	FGA	Pct	FT	FTA	Pct	Tot	Avg	A	PF	TO	Stl	Blk
Tim Joyce	25	-	902	36.1	548	21.9	230	417	0.552	88	113	0.779	151	6.0	46	80		22	5
Steve Skaggs	24	-	903	37.6	487	20.3	200	414	0.483	87	118	0.737	114	4.8	37	56		15	4
Bucky Walden	25	-	791	31.6	237	9.5	89	215	0.414	59	75	0.787	74	3.0	94	70		38	5
Ernie Whitus	27	-	674	25.0	227	8.4	77	187	0.412	73	111	0.658	184	6.8	38	92		7	26
Brewer Gray	25	-	731	29.2	154	6.2	67	181	0.370	20	41	0.488	230	9.2	54	75		19	12
Bob Leon	25	-	394	15.8	86	3.4	20	38	0.526	46	59	0.780	28	1.1	68	45		18	0
Jan Smoljan	25	-	297	11.9	72	2.9	24	64	0.375	24	36	0.667	31	1.2	24	28		11	2
Jim Zalenka	22	-	241	11.0	70	3.2	29	78	0.372	12	21	0.571	56	2.5	11	33		3	5
Bill Littlefield	19	-	111	5.8	46	2.4	19	46	0.413	8	12	0.667	9	0.5	10	27		8	3
John Patterson	23	-	266	5.2	33	1.7	16	34	0.471	1	8	0.125	35	0.6	0	22		2	2
Mark Lauretti	13	-	67	11.6	22	1.4	9	22	0.409	4	6	0.667	8	1.5	5	13		2	0
Jim Marhulik	16	-	52	3.3	15	0.9	4	7	0.571	7	8	0.875	10	0.6	0	12		10	0
Mike Borden	4	-	14	3.5	3	0.8	1	1	1.000	1	2	0.500	1	0.3	0	1		1	0
Greg Winbush	2	-	5	2.5	0	0.0	0	3	0.000	0	0	0.000	0	0.0	0	1		0	0
Total	27	-	-	-	2000	74.1	785	1707	0.460	430	610	0.705	1082	40.1	387	555		156	64
Opponents	27	-	-	-	2024	75.0	810	1765	0.459	402	571	0.704	1101	40.8	353	582		150	64

Legend
GP	Games played	GS	Games started	Avg	Average per game
FG	Field-goals made	FGA	Field-goal attempts	Off	Offensive rebounds
Def	Defensive rebounds	A	Assists	TO	Turnovers
Blk	Blocks	Stl	Steals	High	Team high
