= Joby Wright =

American basketball coach and former player (born 1950)

Personal information
- Born: September 5, 1950 (age 76)
- Listed height: 6 ft 8 in (2.03 m)
- Listed weight: 220 lb (100 kg)

Career information
- High school: Sol C. Johnson (Savannah, Georgia)
- College: Indiana (1969–1972)
- NBA draft: 1972: 2nd round, 5th overall pick
- Drafted by: Seattle SuperSonics
- Playing career: 1972–1978
- Position: Power forward / center
- Number: 14, 20, 22, 24
- Coaching career: 1990–2000

Career history

Playing
- 1972–1973: Seattle SuperSonics
- 1973–1974: Memphis Tams
- 1974–1975: AS Berck
- 1975: San Diego Sails
- 1976: Virginia Squires
- 1977–1978: Turun NMKY

Coaching
- 1990–1993: Miami (Ohio)
- 1993–1997: Wyoming
- 1999–2000: Cincinnati Stuff

Career highlights
- Fourth-team Parade All-American (1968)
- Stats at NBA.com
- Stats at Basketball Reference

Career coaching record
- NCAA: 114–89 (.562)

Joseph A. "Joby" Wright (born September 5, 1950) is an American former college and professional basketball player who was men's basketball head coach at Miami University and at the University of Wyoming.

== Early life ==
Wright starred in basketball at Johnson High School in Savannah, Georgia. In 2004, the Savannah News named Wright one of the "Fantastic 15" top 15 all-time high school basketball players in Savannah.

== College career ==
Wright played college basketball at Indiana University, where in three varsity seasons he averaged 17.4 points per game and a total of 1,272 points. As a sophomore in 1969–70, Wright averaged 14.7 points for game, tied for second on the team, and he was second in rebounds.

As a junior in 1970–71, Wright had a career-high 18 rebounds in one game against Notre Dame. He was again the second-leading scorer with 17.8 points per game (behind George McGinnis) and third in rebounding. The Hoosiers posted a 17–7 record under coach Lou Watson.

In 1971–72, Wright's senior season, Bob Knight became the Hoosiers' coach. Wright was named team captain and earned all-Big Ten honors, leading the Hoosiers in scoring with 19.9 points per game, and he was second in rebounding. The Hoosiers posted a 17–8 record and played in the National Invitation Tournament (NIT).

== Professional career ==
He was selected in the second round (18th overall) of the 1972 NBA draft by the NBA Seattle SuperSonics. In his rookie year of 1972–73, Wright played in 77 games, averaging 12 minutes per game and 3.9 points and 2.8 rebounds per game.

The following season, 1973–74, he played in three games in the ABA with the Memphis Tams, averaging 4.0 points and 4.7 rebounds per game. He did not play in 1974–75, then in 1975–76 he played a total of 23 games with the ABA's Virginia Squires and San Diego Sails, averaging 5.3 points and 2.6 rebounds per game. After his three NBA/ABA seasons, Wright then played professional basketball for two years in Europe.

== Coaching career ==
Wright returned to Indiana University in 1978 and completed his bachelor's degree requirements, then earned a master's degree, both in physical education. He served as an assistant coach at Indiana under his former coach, Bob Knight, for nine seasons. During those seasons, he was part of NCAA championship teams in 1981 and 1987, nine NCAA tournament appearances, and four Big Ten titles.

In 1990, Wright was named the head coach at Miami (Ohio), replacing Jerry Peirson, who had posted four consecutive losing seasons. In Wright's first season at the helm, the Redskins (now RedHawks) posted a 16–12 record.

In his second season, 1991–92, Miami went 23–8, won the Mid-American Conference (MAC) championship with a 13–3 record, and advanced to the NCAA Tournament, falling in the first round to North Carolina, 68–63.

In his third season, 1992–93, Wright's team went 22–9 and earned a MAC co-championship, with Wright named MAC Coach of the Year. Miami went to the National Invitation Tournament (NIT), where they defeated Ohio State 56–53. They then defeated Old Dominion, 60–58 before falling to Georgetown, 66–53.

In 1993, Wright left Miami to accept the head coaching job at the University of Wyoming. In his first season, 1993–94, the Cowboys posted a 14–14 record and 7–11 in the Western Athletic Conference (WAC). In the next three seasons under Wright, Wyoming's records were 13–15, 14–15 and 12–16. In 1997, after a first-round loss in the WAC tournament, Wright resigned as Wyoming coach. His career head coaching record in seven seasons was 114–89.

In 1999, he was hired by the Harlem Globetrotters with the title Head Coach and Director of Competitive Play, which meant that he was not a traditional Globetrotters coach, but one who directed the team in truly competitive games, including against foreign national teams and major American universities.

Wright currently serves as Head Coach and Technical Director of NBA Africa, the league's development program in Africa. He is also CEO/President of Joby Wright Basketball School/Wright Way Foundation.

== Career playing statistics ==
Legend
GP	Games played	GS	Games started	MPG	Minutes per game
FG%	Field goal percentage	3P%	3-point field goal percentage	FT%	Free throw percentage
RPG	Rebounds per game	APG	Assists per game	SPG	Steals per game
BPG	Blocks per game	PPG	Points per game	**Bold**	Career high

=== NBA/ABA ===
==== Regular season ====
Year	Team	GP	MPG	FG%	3P%	FT%	RPG	APG	SPG	BPG	PPG
1972–73	Seattle (NBA)	**77**	12.1	.478		.416	2.8	**.5**			3.9
1973–74	Memphis (ABA)	3	10.3	.313	–	**1.000**	**4.7**	.0	.0	**.3**	4.0
1975–76	San Diego (ABA)	10	10.5	**.593**	–	.400	2.2	.0	**.4**	.2	3.6
1975–76	Virginia (ABA)	13	**15.4**	.415	–	.607	2.8	.2	.1	.2	**6.5**
Career (ABA)		26	12.9	.440	–	.575	2.8	.1	.2	.2	5.1
Career (overall)		103	12.3	.467	–	.465	2.8	.4	.2	.2	4.2
