= 1991–92 Miami Redskins men's basketball team =

American college basketball season

1991–92 Miami Redskins men's basketball

MAC Regular season champion MAC tournament champion

NCAA tournament
- Conference: Mid-American Conference
- Record: 23–8 (13–3 MAC)
- Head coach: Joby Wright (2nd season)
- Home arena: Millett Hall

1991–92 Mid-American Conference men's basketball standings
	Conf.				Overall
Team	W		L	PCT	W		L	PCT
Miami (OH) †	13	–	3	.813	23	–	8	.742
Ball State	11	–	5	.688	24	–	9	.727
Western Michigan	11	–	5	.688	21	–	9	.700
Ohio	10	–	6	.625	18	–	10	.643
Bowling Green	8	–	8	.500	14	–	15	.483
Kent State	6	–	10	.375	9	–	19	.321
Central Michigan	6	–	10	.375	12	–	16	.429
Eastern Michigan	4	–	12	.250	9	–	22	.290
Toledo	3	–	13	.188	7	–	20	.259
† 1992 MAC tournament winner Rankings from AP Poll

The 1991–92 Miami Redskins men's basketball team represent Miami University in the 1991–92 NCAA Division I men's basketball season. The Redskins, led by 2nd-year head coach Joby Wright, played their home games at Millett Hall in Oxford, Ohio as members of the Mid-American Conference. The team finished atop the conference regular season standings, and followed that success by winning the MAC tournament to earn an automatic bid to the NCAA tournament. As the No. 13 seed in the Southeast region, Miami was beaten by North Carolina in the opening round, 68–63.

== Roster ==
1991–92 Miami RedHawks men's basketball team
Players	Coaches
Pos. / # / Name / Height / Weight / Year / Hometown; F / 40 / David Scott / 6 ft 7 in (2.01 m) / — / Sr	Head coach: Joby Wright (Indiana); Assistant coach(es) Legend: (C) Team captain; (S) Suspended; (I) Ineligible; (W) Walk-on; Injured; Current redshirt

== Schedule and results ==
Date time, TV	Rank^{#}	Opponent^{#}	Result	Record	Site (attendance) city, state
Non-conference regular season
Nov 23, 1991*		Earlham	W 93–45	1–0	Millett Hall; Oxford, Ohio
Nov 26, 1991*		at No. 5 Ohio State	L 61–94	1–1	St. John Arena; Columbus, Ohio
Nov 30, 1991*		at Cincinnati	L 62–82	1–2	Myrl Shoemaker Center; Cincinnati, Ohio
Dec 7, 1991*		DePauw	W 66–44	2–2	Millett Hall; Oxford, Ohio
Dec 7, 1991*		Indiana State	W 77–61	3–2	Millett Hall; Oxford, Ohio
Dec 12, 1991*		at Dayton	W 59–47	2–2	University of Dayton Arena; Dayton, Ohio
Dec 14, 1991*		Xavier	W 73–58	3–2	Millett Hall; Oxford, Ohio
Dec 21, 1991*		at Fairfield	W 75–66	4–2	Alumni Hall; Fairfield, Connecticut
Dec 27, 1991*		vs. Illinois State; Lobo Invitational Semifinal	W 63–51	5–2	The Pit (15,501); Albuquerque, New Mexico
Dec 28, 1991*		at New Mexico	L 55–63	5–3	The Pit; Albuquerque, New Mexico
MAC regular season
Jan 8, 1992		at Toledo	W 69–39	6–3 (1–0)	John F. Savage Hall; Toledo, Ohio
Jan 11, 1992		Kent State	W 59–49	7–3 (2–0)	Millett Hall; Oxford, Ohio
Jan 15, 1992		at Ball State	L 64–70	7–4 (2–1)	Irving Gymnasium; Muncie, Indiana
Jan 18, 1992*		at Penn State	L 73–87	7–5	Rec Hall; University Park, Pennsylvania
Jan 22, 1992		Western Michigan	W 59–53	8–5 (3–1)	Millett Hall; Oxford, Ohio
Jan 25, 1992		at Ohio	W 91–86	9–5 (4–1)	Convocation Center; Athens, Ohio
Jan 29, 1992		Central Michigan	W 99–81	10–5 (5–1)	Millett Hall; Oxford, Ohio
Mar 7, 1992		Toledo	W 68–46	20–7 (13–3)	Millett Hall; Oxford, Ohio
MAC tournament
Mar 13, 1992*	(1)	vs. (8) Eastern Michigan; Quarterfinals	W 67–66	21–7	Cobo Arena; Detroit, Michigan
Mar 14, 1992*	(1)	vs. (5) Bowling Green; Semifinals	W 70–60	22–7	Cobo Arena; Detroit, Michigan
Mar 15, 1992*	(1)	vs. (2) Ball State; Championship Game	W 58–57	23–7	Cobo Arena; Detroit, Michigan
NCAA tournament
Mar 19, 1992*	(13 SE)	vs. (4 SE) No. 18 North Carolina; First round	L 63–68	23–8	Riverfront Coliseum; Cincinnati, Ohio
*Non-conference game. ^{#}Rankings from AP Poll. (#) Tournament seedings in parentheses. All times are in Eastern Time.
