= Darrell Hedric =

American basketball player, coach, and scout

Biographical details
- Born: June 9, 1933 (age 93); Franklin, Ohio, U.S.

Playing career
- 1952–1955: Miami (OH)

Coaching career (HC unless noted)
- 1957–1958: Miami (OH) (assistant)
- 1958–1960: Taft HS (OH)
- 1960–1970: Miami (OH) (assistant)
- 1970–1984: Miami (OH)

Administrative career (AD unless noted)
- 1984–1994: Miami (OH) (associate AD)

Head coaching record
- Overall: 216–157 (.579) (college)
- Tournaments: 1–4 (NCAA)

Accomplishments and honors

Championships
- 5 MAC regular season (1971, 1973, 1977, 1978, 1984); MAC tournament (1984)

Awards
- 3× MAC Coach of the Year (1971, 1973, 1984); No. 86 retired by Miami RedHawks

Darrell Hedric (born June 9, 1933) is an American basketball head coach and scout, most noted as the coach of the Miami University (Ohio) basketball team from 1970 to 1984.

== Early history ==
Hedric was born and raised in Franklin, Ohio. He was a standout on the Franklin Wildcats basketball team. During his senior year, he was recruited to play college basketball at Miami University the following year. Hedric went on to gain his varsity letter in all four years at Miami.

After graduation, Hedric played professional basketball for the Akron Goodyear Wingfoots of the National Industrial Basketball League. He was drafted into the United States Navy and served on a destroyer in Antarctica. After serving his country, Hedric once again turned to basketball, taking the head coaching job at Taft High School in Hamilton, Ohio.

== Miami University coaching history ==
Subsequently, Hedric returned to Miami University to serve as an assistant coach. In 1970 Hedric took the reins of the school's basketball program as the head coach, a position he held until 1984. By the end of his coaching career, he amassed several notable achievements including defeating defending national champion Marquette in the NCAA tournament, and regular season wins over coaching legends Bobby Knight and Dean Smith. Hedric remains the only coach to have defeated both Knight and Smith on their home courts.

Hedric compiled a record of 216–157 at Miami, and along the way recruited several excellent players, most notably Ron Harper, who went on to win multiple NBA championships.

He was inducted into the Miami Athletic Hall of Fame in 1978, and in 1986 Miami retired his jersey #86. He is an inductee of the Franklin and Butler County Halls of Fame. He was inducted into the Ohio Basketball Hall of Fame in 2012.

== Head coaching record ==
Record table
Season	Team	Overall	Conference	Standing	Postseason
Miami Redskins (Mid-American Conference) (1970–1984)
1970–71	Miami	20–5	9–1	1st	NCAA University Division First Round
1971–72	Miami	12–12	4–6	5th	
1972–73	Miami	18–9	9–2	1st	NCAA University Division First Round
1973–74	Miami	13–13	6–6	T–4th	
1974–75	Miami	19–7	8–5	4th	
1975–76	Miami	18–8	14–2	2nd	
1976–77	Miami	20–6	13–3	T–1st	
1977–78	Miami	19–9	12–4	1st	NCAA Division I Sweet 16
1978–79	Miami	9–18	6–10	T–7th	
1979–80	Miami	9–18	7–9	T–4th	
1980–81	Miami	11–15	6–10	T–7th	
1981–82	Miami	11–16	8–8	T–4th	
1982–83	Miami	13–15	10–8	T–3rd	
1983–84	Miami	24–6	16–2	1st	NCAA Division I First Round
Miami:		216–157 (.579)	128–76 (.627)		
Total:		216–157 (.579)			
National champion Postseason invitational champion Conference regular season champion Conference regular season and conference tournament champion Division regular season champion Division regular season and conference tournament champion Conference tournament champion
