= 1984 MAC men's basketball tournament =

- Classification: Division I
- Season: 1983–84
- Teams: 7
- Site: Rockford MetroCentre; Rockford, Illinois
- Champions: Miami (OH)
- Winning coach: Darrell Hedric
- MAC men's basketball tournaments

1983–84 Mid-American Conference men's basketball standings
| | Conf. | | | | Overall |
| Team | W | | L | PCT | W | | L | PCT |
|---|---|---|---|---|---|---|---|---|
| Miami† | 16 | – | 2 | .889 | 24 | – | 6 | .800 |
| Ohio | 14 | – | 4 | .778 | 20 | – | 8 | .714 |
| Bowling Green | 11 | – | 7 | .611 | 18 | – | 10 | .643 |
| Toledo | 11 | – | 7 | .611 | 18 | – | 11 | .621 |
| Northern Illinois | 9 | – | 9 | .500 | 12 | – | 15 | .444 |
| Eastern Michigan | 8 | – | 10 | .444 | 12 | – | 17 | .414 |
| Kent State | 8 | – | 10 | .444 | 15 | – | 14 | .517 |
| Central Michigan | 6 | – | 12 | .333 | 11 | – | 16 | .407 |
| Ball State | 5 | – | 13 | .278 | 8 | – | 19 | .296 |
| Western Michigan | 2 | – | 16 | .111 | 4 | – | 22 | .154 |
† Mid-American Conference tournament winner Rankings from AP Poll

The 1984 MAC men's basketball tournament took place March 8–10, 1984, at the Rockford MetroCentre in Rockford, Illinois. Miami (OH) defeated Kent State, 42–40 in the championship game, to win its second MAC Tournament title.

The Redskins earned an automatic bid to the 1984 NCAA tournament as No. 9 seed in the West region. In the round of 48, Miami was defeated by SMU 83–69.

== Format ==
Only the top seven in the regular season conference standings participated, with the bottom three teams left out. Miami received a bye to the semifinal round.

== Bracket ==
Quarterfinals; March 8
4 | Toledo | 73
5 | Northern Illinois | 68
3 | Bowling Green | 58
6 | Eastern Michigan | 64
2 | Ohio | 53
7 | Kent State | 57

Semifinals; March 9
1 | Miami (OH) | 51
4 | Toledo | 46
6 | Eastern Michigan | 58
7 | Kent State | 67

Final; March 10
1 | Miami (OH) | 42
7 | Kent State | 40
