= Archie Aldridge =

American basketball player

Personal information
- Born: c. 1954 (age 71–72) Middletown, Ohio, U.S.
- Listed height: 6 ft 5 in (1.96 m)

Career information
- High school: Middletown (Middletown, Ohio)
- College: Florida State (1973–1974); Miami (Ohio) (1975–1978)
- NBA draft: 1978: 6th round, 125th overall pick
- Drafted by: Washington Bullets
- Position: Forward

Career highlights
- MAC Player of the Year (1978); 2× First-team All-MAC (1977, 1978); Second-team All-MAC (1976)
- Stats at Basketball Reference

Archie Aldridge (born c. 1954) is an American former professional basketball player. He played college basketball for the Florida State Seminoles and Miami RedHawks. Aldridge was awarded as the Mid-American Conference Player of the Year in 1978 and was a three-time all-conference selection with the RedHawks. He was selected in the 1978 NBA draft by the Washington Bullets and played professionally overseas for two seasons.

== High school career ==
Aldridge is a native of Middletown, Ohio, and attended Middletown High School where he was named the best player in the state in 1973. As a senior, he averaged a nation-best 35.2 points, 17 rebounds and 10 blocks per game. Aldridge's 1,514 career points rank second in school history after Jerry Lucas.

His number 51 jersey was retired by the school in 2013.

== College career ==
Aldridge received many college scholarship offers and chose to play for the Florida State Seminoles which he later considered a mistake. He only lasted one season with the Seminoles before he transferred to the Miami RedHawks in his home state of Ohio due to homesickness. Aldridge was forced to sit out during the 1974–75 season due to National Collegiate Athletic Association (NCAA) transfer rules and experienced depression that he persevered through.

Aldridge returned for his sophomore season in 1975–76 and was selected to the All-Mid-American Conference (MAC) second-team. He was selected to the first-team in 1977 as the RedHawks finished with a 20–6 record but were not invited to the NCAA tournament or National Invitation Tournament.

Aldridge was selected as the MAC Player of the Year during his senior season in 1977–78. He led the RedHawks to an upset victory over the defending national champion Marquette Warriors in the first round of the 1978 NCAA tournament. Aldridge left the RedHawks as their all-time leading scorer with 1,490 points and held the record until it was surpassed by Ron Harper.

Aldridge was inducted into the Miami Athletic Hall of Fame in 1989.

== Professional career ==
Aldridge was selected in the sixth round of the 1978 NBA draft by the Washington Bullets. He joined the Bullets for their rookie camp in 1979 but was cut before the season began.

Aldridge played basketball overseas for two seasons. He decided to return home after a phone call with his grandmother where she told him to "leave that ball alone."

== Post-playing career ==
Aldridge worked for 31 years as a substitute teacher throughout school districts in Ohio. He also worked as a corrections officer at the Lebanon Correctional Institution.

== Personal life ==
Aldridge is divorced and has four children. He writes poetry, enjoys reading and considered a career as a motivational speaker.

Aldridge had heart issues and both hips replaced but stated his health was "very well" in a 2020 interview. He is permanently disabled due to his hip replacements and uses a cane or walker to move.
