= Miami RedHawks men's basketball =

Men's basketball team for Miami University

2026–27 Miami RedHawks men's basketball team
- University: Miami University
- First season: 1905; 121 years ago
- Head coach: Travis Steele (4th season)
- Location: Oxford, Ohio
- Arena: Millett Hall (capacity: 9,200)
- Conference: Mid-American
- Nickname: RedHawks
- Colors: Red and white

NCAA Division I tournament Sweet Sixteen
- 1958, 1969, 1978, 1999

NCAA Division I tournament appearances
- 1953, 1955, 1957, 1958, 1966, 1969, 1971, 1973, 1978, 1984, 1985, 1986, 1992, 1995, 1997, 1999, 2007, 2026

Conference tournament champions
- 1984, 1992, 1997, 2007

Conference regular-season champions
- 1952, 1953, 1955, 1957, 1958, 1966, 1969, 1971, 1973, 1977, 1978, 1984, 1986, 1992, 1995, 1997, 1999, 2005, 2026

Conference division champions
- 1999, 2005

Uniforms
Home	Away

The Miami RedHawks men's basketball team (known as the Miami Redskins until 1997) is the intercollegiate men's basketball program representing Miami University. The school competes in the Mid-American Conference in Division I of the National Collegiate Athletic Association (NCAA), and play their home games at Millett Hall in Oxford, Ohio. Miami has reached the NCAA Championship's Sweet Sixteen four times and has been the MAC regular season champions 19 times. The RedHawks have appeared in the NCAA Tournament 18 times, most recently in 2026.

The team is currently coached by Travis Steele. In May 2013, the Ohio Basketball Hall of Fame inducted 11 players and coaches who starred in the state, including Miami's Wayne Embry, Randy Ayers, Ron Harper and Wally Szczerbiak.

== History ==
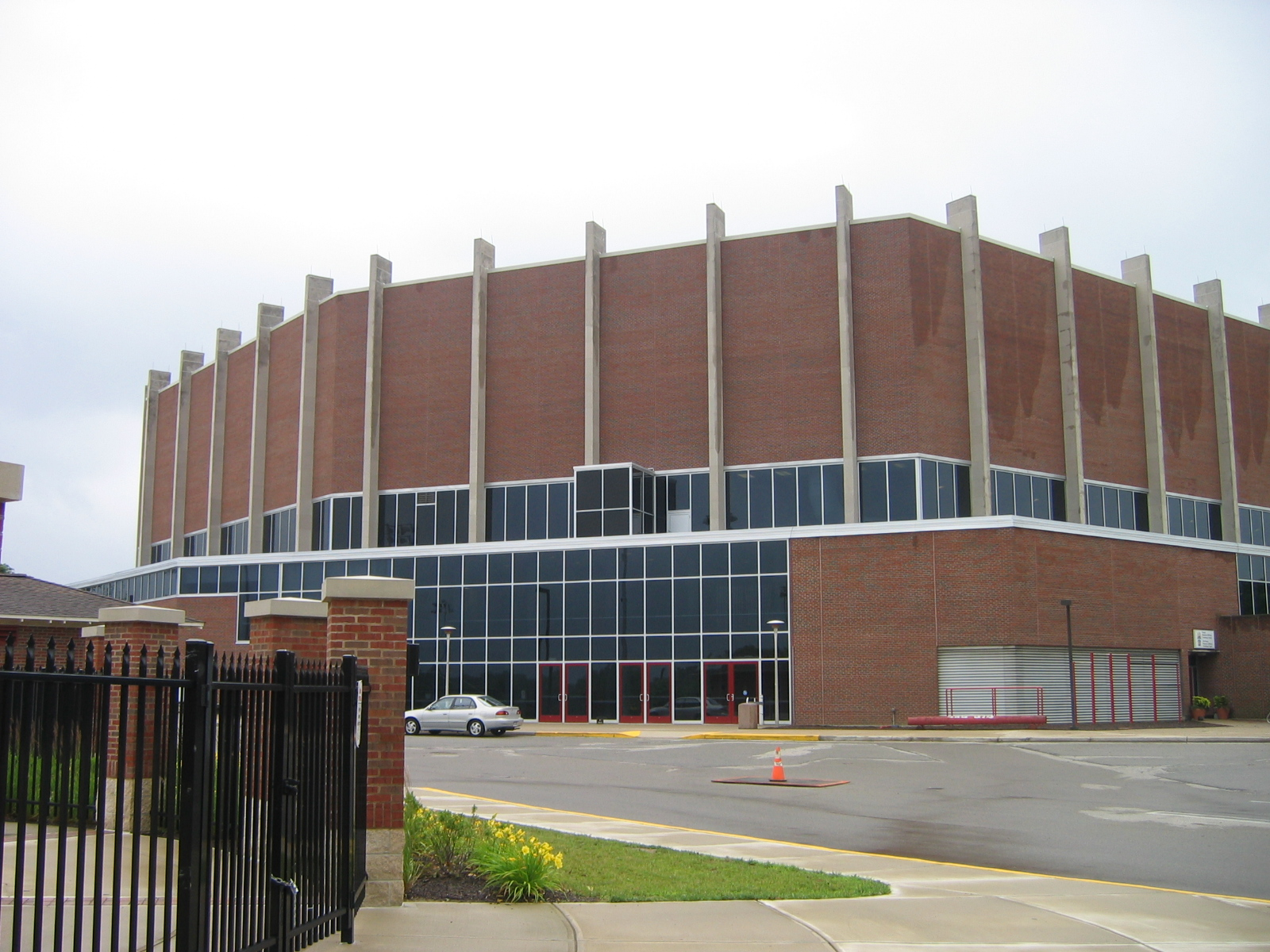
The program plays at Millett Hall in Oxford, which opened in 1968.

Miami fielded its first varsity basketball team in 1905. The program joined the Mid-American Conference (MAC) in 1947.

=== 1951–1970: Rohr, Shrider and Locke eras ===
Under head coach Bill Rohr, who led the program from 1951 to 1957, Miami first played in the NCAA Men's Division I Basketball Tournament in 1953, where they lost in the first round. Rohr's teams would win four MAC championships and make three NCAA tournament appearances.

Dick Shrider was named head coach in 1957, and during his tenure team captain Wayne Embry led the then-Redskins to conference championships and NCAA Tournament appearances in 1957 and 1958, where the program reached its first Sweet Sixteen. Shrider retiring from coaching in 1966 but stayed as the school's athletic director until 1988.

Tates Locke was the Redskins head coach from 1966 to 1970, winning a MAC title in 1968–69 and a first-round victory in the 1969 NCAA University Division basketball tournament.

=== 1970–1984: Hedric era ===
Under coach Darrell Hedric, who led the program from 1970 to 1984, the Redskins amassed several notable achievements, including reaching the NCAA tournament in 1971, 1973, and 1978, with the 1977–78 team defeating defending national champion Marquette in the first round of the NCAA tournament. Hedric also secured regular season wins over coaching legends Bobby Knight and Dean Smith.

After the MAC tournament was created in 1980, the program won its first conference title in the 1984 MAC men's basketball tournament. The Redskins earned an automatic bid to the 1984 NCAA tournament as a #8 seed and would be defeated by #9 SMU in Hedric's last season as head coach. Hedric compiled a record of 216–157 at Miami, and along the way recruited several excellent players, most notably Ron Harper, who went on to win multiple NBA championships.

=== 1984–1996: Peirson, Wright and Sendek eras ===
Jerry Peirson was named head coach to replace Hedric, but after posting four consecutive losing seasons, Joby Wright was named the head coach in 1990. In his first season, the Redskins posted a winning 16–12 record.

In his second season, the 1991–92 team went 23–8, won the MAC championship with a 13–3 record, and advanced to the NCAA Tournament, falling in the first round to #4 North Carolina. In his third season, Wright's team went 22–9 and earned a MAC co-championship, with Wright named MAC Coach of the Year. Miami went to the National Invitation Tournament, where they defeated Ohio State and Old Dominion before falling to Georgetown in the quarterfinals. Wright left Miami in 1993 to accept the head coaching job at Wyoming.

From 1993 to 1996, Herb Sendek coached the Redskins, where in the 1995 NCAA tournament #12 Miami upset #5 Arizona 71–62 before losing to #4 Virginia in overtime in the second round. In Sendek's third season at Miami, 1995–96, the team earned a berth in the 1996 NIT, losing a first-round game to Fresno State. Sendek was hired as the head coach of North Carolina State in 1996.

=== 1996–2012: Coles era ===
Charlie Coles was the Miami RedHawks head coach from 1996 to 2012. The program changed its name from the Miami Redskins to Miami RedHawks in 1997. Miami won three MAC regular-season crowns in 1997, 1999 and 2005, as well as the 1997 MAC tournament championship and 2007 MAC tournament championship. In Coles' first tournament, the 1996–97 team lost in the first round to #14 Clemson. The 1998–99 team was led by future NBA forward Wally Szczerbiak and reached the Sweet Sixteen, defeating #7 Washington and #2 Utah before losing to #3 Kentucky. The 2006–07 team was defeated in the first round of the NCAA tournament by #3 Oregon. Coles retired with an overall record of 263–224.

=== 2012–2022: Cooper and Owens eras ===
John Cooper served as the head coach of the from 2012 to 2017. He was hired after the retirement of Charlie Coles. He was dismissed after the 2016–17 season, ending with a 59–100 overall record at Miami.

Jack Owens served as the head coach from 2017 to 2022, marking his first Division I head coaching opportunity. In his first season, he led Miami to a 16–18 record and a berth in the 2018 College Basketball Invitational, the program's first postseason appearance since 2011. In the 2020–21 season, he helped Miami record its first winning season since 2009. Owens compiled a 70–83 overall record before moving to an assistant coaching role at Ohio State.

=== 2022–present: Steele era ===
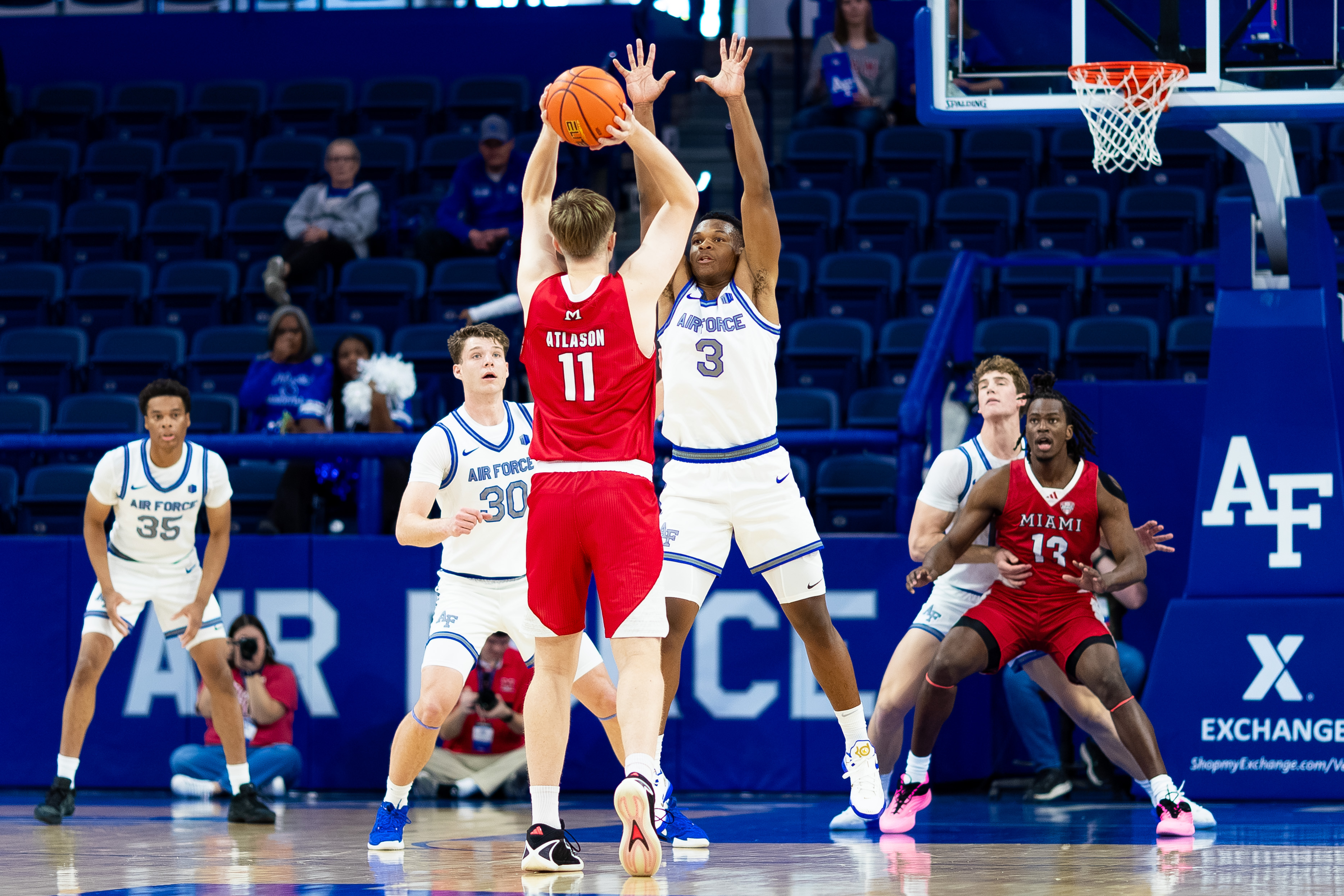
The 2025–26 Miami RedHawks men's basketball team playing against the Air Force Falcons

Travis Steele became the head coach in 2022, after previously serving as head coach at Xavier. In his first season, Steele guided the RedHawks to a 12–20 overall record while reaching the MAC Tournament quarterfinals. Despite struggles, the team finished the year winning four of its final five regular-season games to secure a postseason berth after being projected near the bottom of the conference. In the 2023–24 season, Miami improved to 15–17 and 9–9 in conference.

Steele's team took a much better improvement during the 2024–25 season, when Miami posted a 25–9 record and finished 14–4 in MAC play, the program's most conference wins since 2005–06. The RedHawks reached the 2025 MAC tournament championship and produced multiple All-MAC performers, highlighting one of the biggest single-season turnarounds in program history. Miami soon signed Steele to a contract extension running through the 2031–32 season.

The 2025–26 team went an undefeated 31–0 in the regular season, becoming only the third Division I program ever to enter a conference tournament at 31–0. Steele committed on College GameDay to be hoisted while in a swimming motion wearing only a Speedo on Selection Sunday if the team won its final six games and the 2026 MAC men's basketball tournament, in recognition of the Miami Redhawks swim team that had shown up in the winter to support the basketball team in just their Speedo trunks. The team suffered their first loss of the season in the first round of the MAC tournament, to UMass. Miami was then selected for at-large bid as an 11 seed in the 2026 NCAA Division I men's basketball tournament, their first appearance since 2007. The RedHawks defeated #11 SMU 89–79 in the First Four, the program's first tournament win since 1999, before their season ended in a loss against #6 Tennessee.

== Postseason ==
=== NCAA tournament results ===
The RedHawks have appeared in the NCAA Tournament 18 times. Their combined record is 7–20.

Year	Seed	Round	Opponent	Result
1953		First Round	DePaul	L 72–74
1955		First Round	Marquette	L 79–90
1957		First Round	Notre Dame	L 77–89
1958		First Round; Sweet Sixteen; Regional 3rd Place Game	Pittsburgh; Kentucky; Indiana	W 82–77; L 70–94; L 91–98
1966		First Round	Dayton	L 51–58
1969		First Round; Sweet Sixteen; Regional 3rd Place Game	Notre Dame; Purdue; Kentucky	W 63–60; L 71–91; L 71–72
1971		First Round	Marquette	L 47–62
1973		First Round	Marquette	L 62–77
1978		First Round; Sweet Sixteen	Marquette; Kentucky	W 84–81 ^{OT} L 69–91
1984	#8	First Round	#9 SMU	L 69–83
1985	#12	First Round	#5 Maryland	L 68–69 ^{OT}
1986	#10	First Round	#7 Iowa State	L 79–81 ^{OT}
1992	#13	First Round	#4 North Carolina	L 63–68
1995	#12	First Round; Second Round	#5 Arizona #4 Virginia	W 71–62; L 54–60 ^{OT}
1997	#13	First Round	#4 Clemson	L 56–68
1999	#10	First Round; Second Round; Sweet Sixteen	#7 Washington #2 Utah #3 Kentucky	W 59–58; W 66–58; L 43–58
2007	#14	First Round	#3 Oregon	L 56–58
2026	#11	First Four; First Round	#11 SMU #6 Tennessee	W 89–79; L 78–56

=== NIT results ===
The RedHawks have appeared in the National Invitation Tournament (NIT) six times. Their combined record is 2–6.

Year	Round	Opponent	Result
1970	First Round	St. John's	L 57–70
1993	First Round; Second Round; Quarterfinals	Ohio State; Old Dominion; Georgetown	W 56–53; W 60–58; L 53–66
1994	First Round	Xavier	L 68–80
1996	First Round	Fresno State	L 57–58
2005	First Round	TCU	L 58–60
2006	Opening Round	Butler	L 52–53

=== CBI results ===
The RedHawks have appeared in the College Basketball Invitational (CBI) three times. Their combined record is 0–3.

Year	Round	Opponent	Result
2008	First Round	Tulsa	L 45–61
2011	First Round	Rhode Island	L 59–76
2018	First Round	Campbell	L 87–97

== Retired numbers ==
Miami RedHawks retired numbers
No.	Player	Pos.	Tenure	No. ret.	Ref.
10	Charlie Coles	G	1963–1965	2015	
23	Wayne Embry	C	1956–1958	1995	
32	Wally Szczerbiak	SG / SF	1995–1999	2001	
34	Ron Harper	SG/PG	1982–1986	1986	
44	Dick Walls	C	1951–1953	1995	
86	Darrell Hedric		1952–1955	1997	

== RedHawks in the NBA ==
Miami University has had 8 former players who have gone on to play in the NBA.

Name	Years in NBA
Bob Brown	1949-1950
Wayne Embry	1959-1969
Fred Foster	1969-1977
Ron Harper	1987-2001
Phil Lumpkin	1975-1976
Ira Newble	2001-2008
Wally Szczerbiak	2000-2009
Dave Zeller	1962

== RedHawks currently in international leagues ==
- Jalen Adaway (born 1998), playing in the Úrvalsdeild karla
- Abdoulaye Harouna (born 1992), playing in the Basketball Africa League
- Nike Sibande (born 1999), playing in the Israeli Basketball Premier League
