= 1994–95 Big East Conference men's basketball season =

American college basketball season

1994–95 Big East Conference Men's Basketball Season
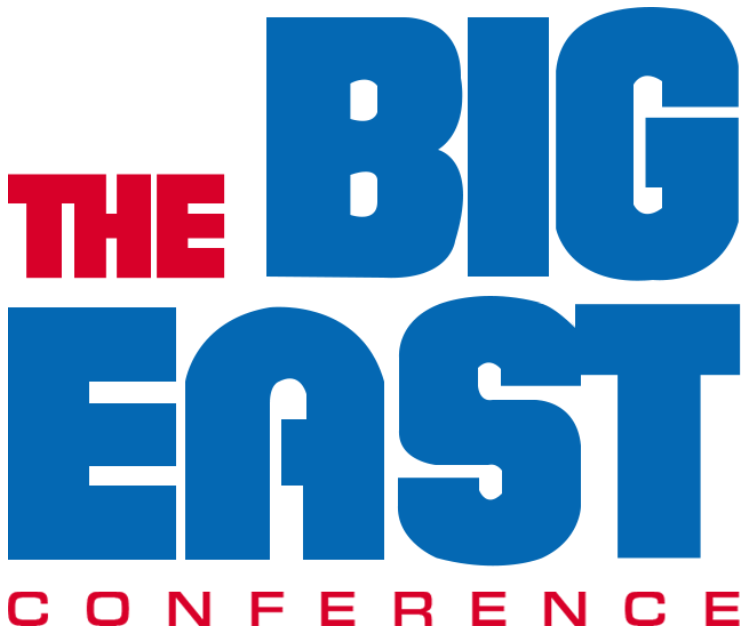
- League: NCAA Division I
- Sport: Basketball
- Duration: November 16, 1994 through March 12, 1995
- Teams: 10
- TV partner: ESPN

Regular Season
- Champion: Connecticut (16–2)
- Season MVP: Kerry Kittles – Villanova

Tournament
- Champions: Villanova
- Finals MVP: Kerry Kittles – Villanova

Basketball seasons
- 1993–94 1995–96

1994–95 Big East men's basketball standings
	Conf.				Overall
Team	W		L	PCT	W		L	PCT
No. 8 Connecticut	16	–	2	.889	28	–	5	.848
No. 9 Villanova †	14	–	4	.778	25	–	8	.758
No. 25 Syracuse	12	–	6	.667	20	–	10	.667
No. 22 Georgetown	11	–	7	.611	21	–	10	.677
Miami	9	–	9	.500	15	–	13	.536
Providence	7	–	11	.389	17	–	13	.567
Seton Hall	7	–	11	.389	16	–	14	.533
St. John's	7	–	11	.389	14	–	14	.500
Pittsburgh	5	–	13	.278	10	–	18	.357
Boston College	2	–	16	.111	9	–	19	.321
† 1995 Big East tournament winner As of April 3, 1995; Rankings from AP Poll

The 1994–95 Big East Conference men's basketball season was the 16th in conference history, and involved its ten full-time member schools.

Connecticut was the regular-season champion with a record of 16–2. Villanova won the Big East tournament championship.

== Season summary & highlights ==
- Connecticut finished as the regular-season champion with a record of 16–2. It was the third regular-season championship or co-championship and second outright championship for Connecticut.
- Villanova won its first Big East tournament championship.

== Head coaches ==
School	Coach	Season	Notes
Boston College	Jim O'Brien	9th	
Connecticut	Jim Calhoun	9th	
Georgetown	John Thompson, Jr.	23rd	
Miami	Leonard Hamilton	5th	Big East Coach of the Year
Pittsburgh	Ralph Willard	1st	
Providence	Pete Gillen	1st	
St. John's	Brian Mahoney	3rd	
Seton Hall	George Blaney	1st	
Syracuse	Jim Boeheim	19th	
Villanova	Steve Lappas	3rd	

== Rankings ==
Connecticut and Syracuse spent all season ranked in the Associated Press poll's Top 25, with Connecticut reaching No. 1. Georgetown and Villanova were in the Top 25 for most of the season, and St. John's also made an appearance.

1994–95 Big East Conference Weekly Rankings Key: ██ Increase in ranking. ██ Decrease in ranking.
AP Poll	Pre	11/21	11/28	12/5	12/12	12/19	12/26	1/2	1/9	1/16	1/23	1/30	2/6	2/13	2/20	2/27	3/6	Final
Boston College																		
Connecticut	9	16	16	10	10	10	8	6	2	2	2	4	3	1	4	4	6	8
Georgetown	15	14	19	18	15	12	12	12	10	10	14	13	20			23	24	22
Miami																		
Pittsburgh																		
Providence																		
St. John's							25											
Seton Hall																		
Syracuse	12	18	22	19	16	14	11	10	8	6	6	10	10	11	17	22	21	25
Villanova	22	21	24	24	22						22	19	16	15	9	11	13	9

== Regular-season statistical leaders ==
Scoring
Name	School	PPG
Danya Abrams	BC	22.1
Kerry Kittles	Vill	21.4
Ray Allen	Conn	21.1
Allen Iverson	GU	20.4
Lawrence Moten	Syr	19.6

Rebounding
Name	School	RPG
Jerome Williams	GU	10.0
Jaime Peterson	Pitt	9.4
Danya Abrams	BC	9.1
Charles Minlend	SJU	8.5
Travis Knight	Conn	8.2

Assists
Name	School	APG
Kevin Ollie	Conn	6.4
Andre Alridge	Pitt	5.8
Doron Sheffer	Conn	5.5
Dan Hurley	SHU	5.3
Michael Lloyd	Syr	5.2

Steals
Name	School	SPG
Allen Iverson	GU	3.0
Adrian Griffin	SHU	2.2
Kerry Kittles	Vill	2.2
Duane Woodward	BC	2.0
Dan Hurley	SHU	2.0

Blocks
Name	School	BPG
Jason Lawson	Vill	2.6
Jaime Peterson	Pitt	2.5
Constantin Popa	Mia	2.0
Don Reid	GU	1.9
John Wallace	Syr	1.8

Field Goals
Name	School	FG%
John Wallace	Syr	.588
Adrian Griffin	SHU	.554
Kerry Kittles	Vill	.524
Danya Abrams	BC	.514
Jaime Peterson	Pitt	.513

3-Pt Field Goals
Name	School	3FG%
Ray Allen	Conn	.445
Eric Eberz	Vill	.439
Kerry Kittles	Vill	.411
(no other qualifiers)

Free Throws
Name	School	FT%
Donny Marshall	Conn	.829
Kevin Ollie	Conn	.806
Andre Alridge	Pitt	.773
Steven Edwards	Mia	.771
Kerry Kittles	Vill	.767

== Postseason ==
=== Big East tournament ===
==== Seeding ====
Seeding in the Big East tournament was based on conference record, with tiebreakers applied as necessary. Teams seeded seventh through tenth played a first-round game, and the other six teams received a bye into the quarterfinals.

The tournament's seeding was as follows: (1) Connecticut, (2) Villanova, (3) Syracuse, (4) Georgetown, (5) Miami, (6) Providence, (7) Seton Hall, (8) St. John's, (9) Pittsburgh, (10) Boston College.

==== Bracket ====
First round March 9, 1995
8	St. John's	71
9	Pittsburgh	74
7	Seton Hall	87
10	Boston College	89^{OT}

Quarterfinals; March 10, 1995
1	#6 Connecticut	81
9	Pittsburgh	78
4	#24 Georgetown	69
5	Miami	58
3	#21 Syracuse	69
6	Providence	71^{OT}
2	#13 Villanova	68
10	Boston College	64

Semifinals; March 11, 1995
1	#6 Connecticut	88
4	#24 Georgetown	81
6	Providence	75
2	#13 Villanova	90

Championship Game; March 12, 1995
1	#6 Connecticut	78
2	#13 Villanova	94

=== NCAA tournament ===
Four Big East teams received bids to the NCAA Tournament. In the East Region, third-seeded Villanova lost to 14th-seeded Old Dominion in a triple-overtime first-round upset. Syracuse lost in the second round and Georgetown in the regional semifinals. Connecticut was defeated in the regional finals.

School	Region	Seed	Round 1	Round 2	Sweet 16	Elite 8
Connecticut	West	2	15 Chattanooga, W 100–71	7 Cincinnati, W 96–91	3 Maryland, W 99–89	1 UCLA, L 102–96
Georgetown	Southeast	6	11 Xavier, W 68–63	14 Weber State, W 53–51	2 North Carolina, L 74–64	
Syracuse	Midwest	7	10 Illinois, W 96–92	2 Arkansas, L 96–94^{(OT)}		
Villanova	East	3	14 Old Dominion, L 89–81^{(3OT)}			

=== National Invitation Tournament ===
Four Big East teams received bids to the National Invitation Tournament, which did not yet have seeding, and played in four different unnamed brackets. Miami, St. John's, and Seton Hall all lost in the first round and Providence in the second round.

School	Round 1	Round 2
Providence	Charleston, W 72–67	Virginia Tech, L 91–78
Miami	Penn State, L 62–56	
St. John's	South Florida, L 74–68	
Seton Hall	Canisius, L 83–71	

== Awards and honors ==
=== Big East Conference ===
Player of the Year:

- * Kerry Kittles, Villanova, G, Jr.

Defensive Player of the Year:

- Allen Iverson, Georgetown, G, Fr.

Rookie of the Year:

- Allen Iverson, Georgetown, G, Fr.

Coach of the Year:

- Leonard Hamilton, Miami (5th season)

All-Big East First Team

- Kerry Kittles, Villanova, G, Jr., 6 ft 5 in (196 cm), 179 lb (81 kg), Dayton, Ohio
- Ray Allen, Connecticut, G, So., 6 ft 5 in (196 cm), 205 lb (93 kg), Merced, Calif.
- Lawrence Moten, Syracuse, G, Sr., 6 ft 5 in (196 cm), 185 lb (84 kg), Washington, D.C.
- John Wallace, Syracuse, F, Jr., 6 ft 8 in (203 cm), 225 lb (102 kg), Rochester, N.Y.
- Eric Williams, Providence, F, Sr., 6 ft 8 in (203 cm), 220 lb (100 kg), Newark, N.J.
- Danya Abrams, Boston College, F, So., 6 ft 7 in (201 cm), 251 lb (114 kg), Westchester, N.Y.

All-Big East Second Team:

- Jaime Peterson, Pittsburgh, C, Sr., 6 ft 9 in (206 cm), 234 lb (106 kg), New York, N.Y.
- Jason Lawson, Villanova, C, So., 6 ft 11 in (211 cm), 240 lb (109 kg), Philadelphia, Pa.
- Eric Eberz, Villanova, F, Jr., 6 ft 7 in (201 cm), 250 lb (113 kg), Buffalo, N.Y.
- Allen Iverson, Georgetown, G., Fr., 6 ft 0 in (183 cm), 165 lb (75 kg), Hampton, Va.
- Doron Sheffer, Connecticut, G, So., 6 ft 5 in (196 cm), 200 lb (91 kg), Ramat Efal, Israel

All-Big East Third Team:

- Constantin Popa, Miami, C, Sr., 7 ft 3 in (221 cm), 235 lb (107 kg), Bucharest, Romania
- Adrian Griffin, Seton Hall, F, Jr., 6 ft 5 in (196 cm), 230 lb (104 kg), Wichita, Kan.
- Felipe López, St. John's, G, Fr., 6 ft 5 in (196 cm), 199 lb (90 kg), Santo Domingo, Dominican Republic
- Jerome Williams, Georgetown, F, Jr., 6 ft 9 in (206 cm), 206 lb (93 kg), Washington, D.C.
- Kevin Ollie, Connecticut, G, Sr., 6 ft 2 in (188 cm), 195 lb (88 kg), Dallas, Tex.
- Donny Marshall, Connecticut, F, Sr., 6 ft 7 in (201 cm), 230 lb (104 kg), Detroit, Mich.

Big East All-Rookie Team:

- Allen Iverson, Georgetown, G., Fr., 6 ft 0 in (183 cm), 165 lb (75 kg), Hampton, Va.
- Kevin Norris, Miami, G, Fr., 5 ft 9 in (175 cm), 195 lb (88 kg), Baltimore, Md.
- Donnell Williams, Seton Hall, G, Fr., 6 ft 7 in (201 cm)
- Felipe López, St. John's, G, Fr., 6 ft 5 in (196 cm), 199 lb (90 kg), Santo Domingo, Dominican Republic
- Zendon Hamilton, St. John's, C, Fr., 6 ft 9 in (206 cm), 240 lb (109 kg), South Floral Park, N.Y.

=== All-Americans ===
The following players were selected to the 1995 Associated Press All-America teams.

Consensus All-America Second Team:

- Kerry Kittles, Villanova, Key Stats: 21.4 ppg, 6.1 rpg, 3.5 apg, 2.2 spg, 52.4 FG%, 41.1 3P%, 706 points

Second Team All-America:

- Kerry Kittles, Villanova, Key Stats: 21.4 ppg, 6.1 rpg, 3.5 apg, 2.2 spg, 52.4 FG%, 41.1 3P%, 706 points

Third Team All-America:

- Ray Allen, Connecticut, Key Stats: 21.1 ppg, 6.8 rpg, 2.3 apg, 1.9 spg, 48.9 FG%, 44.5 3P%, 675 points
- Lawrence Moten, Syracuse, Key Stats: 19.6 ppg, 4.2 rpg, 3.3 apg, 1.8 spg, 45.9 FG%, 32.8 3P%, 589 points

AP Honorable Mention

- Allen Iverson, Georgetown
- Donny Marshall, Connecticut

== See also ==
- 1994–95 NCAA Division I men's basketball season
- 1994–95 Connecticut Huskies men's basketball team
- 1994–95 Georgetown Hoyas men's basketball team
- 1994–95 Pittsburgh Panthers men's basketball team
- 1994–95 St. John's Red Storm men's basketball team
- 1994–95 Syracuse Orangemen basketball team
- 1994–95 Villanova Wildcats men's basketball team
