= Villanova Wildcats men's basketball statistical leaders =

The Villanova Wildcats men's basketball statistical leaders are individual statistical leaders of the Villanova Wildcats men's basketball program in various categories, including points, assists, blocks, rebounds, and steals. Within those areas, the lists identify single-game, single-season, and career leaders. The Wildcats represent Villanova University in the NCAA's Big East Conference.

Villanova began competing in intercollegiate basketball in 1920. However, the school's record book does not generally list records from before the 1950s, as records from before this period are often incomplete and inconsistent. Since scoring was much lower in this era, and teams played much fewer games during a typical season, it is likely that few or no players from this era would appear on these lists anyway.

The NCAA did not officially record assists as a stat until the 1983–84 season, and blocks and steals until the 1985–86 season, but Villanova's record books includes players in these stats before these seasons. These lists are updated through the end of the 2020–21 season.

== Scoring ==
Career
Rk	Player	Points	Seasons
1	Eric Dixon	2,314	2020–21 2021–22 2022–23 2023–24 2024–25
2	Kerry Kittles	2,243	1992–93 1993–94 1994–95 1995–96
3	Scottie Reynolds	2,222	2006–07 2007–08 2008–09 2009–10
4	Keith Herron	2,170	1974–75 1975–76 1976–77 1977–78
5	Bob Schafer	2,094	1951–52 1952–53 1953–54 1954–55
6	Doug West	2,037	1985–86 1986–87 1987–88 1988–89
7	Howard Porter	2,026	1968–69 1969–70 1970–71
8	Allan Ray	2,025	2002–03 2003–04 2004–05 2005–06
9	John Pinone	2,024	1979–80 1980–81 1981–82 1982–83
10	Randy Foye	1,966	2002–03 2003–04 2004–05 2005–06

Season
Rk	Player	Points	Season
1	Bob Schafer	836	1953–54
2	Eric Dixon	815	2024–25
3	Bill Melchionni	801	1965–66
4	Howard Porter	799	1970–71
5	Jalen Brunson	756	2017–18
6	Paul Arizin	735	1949–50
7	Kerry Kittles	706	1994–95
8	Larry Hennessy	703	1950–51
9	Phil Booth	668	2018–19
10	Randy Foye	677	2005–06

Single game
Rk	Player	Points	Season	Opponent
1	Paul Arizin	85	1948–49	NAMC
2	Bob Schafer	46	1953–54	Baldwin-Wallace
3	Joe Lord	45	1946–47	Kings Point
	Larry Hennessy	45	1952–53	Boston College
5	Kerry Kittles	44	1994–95	Boston College
	Larry Hennessy	44	1952–53	Canisius
	Bill Melchionni	44	1965–66	St. Bonaventure
8	Bob Schafer	43	1953–54	N.C. State
9	Paul Arizin	41	1949–50	Seton Hall
10	Scottie Reynolds	40	2008–09	Seton Hall
	Scottie Reynolds	40	2006–07	Connecticut
	Rich Moore	40	1963–64	Seton Hall
	Bill Melchionni	40	1965–66	Oregon State
	Larry Hennessy	40	1952–53	Rider
	Howard Porter	40	1969–70	Seton Hall

== Rebounds ==
Career
Rk	Player	Rebounds	Seasons
1	Howard Porter	1,317	1968–69 1969–70 1970–71
2	Jim Washington	1,194	1962–63 1963–64 1964–65
3	Jack Devine	1,181	1951–52 1952–53 1953–54 1954–55
4	Ed Pinckney	1,107	1981–82 1982–83 1983–84 1984–85
5	Harold Pressley	1,016	1982–83 1983–84 1984–85 1985–86
6	Jim Mooney	1,010	1950–51 1951–52 1952–53
7	Daniel Ochefu	929	2012–13 2013–14 2014–15 2015–16
8	Jason Lawson	908	1993–94 1994–95 1995–96 1996–97
9	Eric Dixon	904	2020–21 2021–22 2022–23 2023–24 2024–25
10	Brooks Sales	858	1998–99 1999–00 2000–01 2001–02

Season
Rk	Player	Rebounds	Season
1	Howard Porter	503	1970–71
2	Jim Mooney	455	1950–51
3	Jim Washington	442	1964–65
4	Howard Porter	438	1969–70
5	George Raveling	405	1958–59
6	Jim Washington	398	1963–64
7	Jack Devine	387	1953–54
8	Thomas J. Brennan	383	1951–52
9	Howard Porter	376	1968–69
10	Harold Pressley	374	1985–86

Single game
Rk	Player	Rebounds	Season	Opponent
1	Howard Porter	30	1970–71	St. Peter's
2	George Raveling	29	1959–60	Seton Hall
3	Howard Porter	27	1968–69	Providence
	Howard Porter	27	1969–70	North Dakota
5	Howard Porter	26	1968–69	Saint Joseph's
6	Daniel Ochefu	24	2014–15	Seton Hall
	Frank Gaidjunas	24	1965–66	La Salle
	Howard Porter	24	1968–69	Xavier
9	Howard Porter	23	1969–70	Toledo
10	Ed Pinckney	22	1982–83	Georgetown
	Howard Porter	22	1968–69	Canisius
	Jim Washington	22	1963–64	La Salle

== Assists ==
Career
Rk	Player	Assists	Seasons
1	Kenny Wilson	627	1985–86 1986–87 1987–88 1988–89
2	Stewart Granger	595	1979–80 1980–81 1981–82 1982–83
3	Alvin Williams	553	1993–94 1994–95 1995–96 1996–97
4	Ryan Arcidiacono	535	2012–13 2013–14 2014–15 2015–16
5	Chris Ford	500	1969–70 1970–71 1971–72
6	Rory Sparrow	495	1976–77 1977–78 1978–79 1979–80
7	Corey Fisher	487	2007–08 2008–09 2009–10 2010–11
8	Scottie Reynolds	482	2006–07 2007–08 2008–09 2009–10
	Collin Gillespie	482	2017–18 2018–19 2019–20 2020–21 2021–22
10	Joe Rogers	474	1973–74 1974–75 1975–76 1976–77

Season
Rk	Player	Assists	Season
1	Chris Ford	238	1970–71
2	Stewart Granger	183	1981–82
3	Stewart Granger	177	1982–83
	Jonathan Haynes	177	1993–94
	Alvin Williams	177	1995–96
6	Acaden Lewis	176	2025–26
7	Kenny Wilson	170	1987–88
	Jhamir Brickus	170	2024–25
9	Ryan Arcidiacono	169	2015–16
10	Stewart Granger	165	1980–81

Single game
Rk	Player	Assists	Season	Opponent
1	Jim Huggard	16	1959–60	Scranton
	Fran O'Hanlon	16	1969–70	Toledo
3	Joe Rogers	15	1976–77	Rutgers
4	Jim Huggard	14	1960–61	Pennsylvania
	Fran O'Hanlon	14	1969–70	North Dakota
	Chris Ford	14	1969–70	St. John's
	Chris Ford	14	1969–70	St. Peter's
	Stewart Granger	14	1981–82	Boston College
9	Joe Rogers	13	1975–76	LaSalle
	Gary McLain	13	1981–82	St. John's
	Kenny Wilson	13	1985–86	St. John's
	Kenny Wilson	13	1986–87	Syracuse
	John Celestand	13	1997–98	West Virginia
	Mike Nardi	13	2003–04	Redlands

== Steals ==
Career
Rk	Player	Steals	Seasons
1	Kerry Kittles	277	1992–93 1993–94 1994–95 1995–96
2	Harold Pressley	216	1982–83 1983–84 1984–85 1985–86
3	Scottie Reynolds	207	2006–07 2007–08 2008–09 2009–10
4	Gary Massey	204	1985–86 1986–87 1987–88 1988–89
5	Alvin Williams	200	1993–94 1994–95 1995–96 1996–97
6	Randy Foye	198	2002–03 2003–04 2004–05 2005–06
7	Ed Pinckney	196	1981–82 1982–83 1983–84 1984–85
8	Lance Miller	190	1989–90 1990–91 1991–92 1992–93
9	Chris Walker	185	1988–89 1989–90 1990–91 1991–92
10	Stewart Granger	181	1979–80 1980–81 1981–82 1982–83

Season
Rk	Player	Steals	Season
1	Kerry Kittles	87	1993–94
2	Harold Pressley	83	1985–86
3	Kyle Lowry	77	2005–06
4	Jonathan Haynes	72	1992–93
	Kerry Kittles	72	1995–96
6	Kerry Kittles	71	1994–95
7	Gary Massey	67	1987–88
	Randy Foye	67	2004–05
9	Jonathan Haynes	63	1993–94
	Darrun Hilliard	63	2014–15
	Acaden Lewis	63	2025–26

Single game
Rk	Player	Steals	Season	Opponent
1	Gary Massey	9	1987–88	Providence
2	Dwayne McClain	7	1983–84	Pittsburgh
	Kerry Kittles	7	1993–94	Providence
	Kyle Lowry	7	2005–06	Temple
5	Stewart Granger	6	1980–81	Pennsylvania
	Stewart Granger	6	1981–82	St. Francis
	Dwayne McClain	6	1983–84	St. John's
	Dwight Wilbur	6	1985–86	Georgetown
	Harold Pressley	6	1985–86	Providence
	Alvin Williams	6	1996–97	Notre Dame
	John Celestand	6	1996–97	Syracuse

== Blocks ==
Career
Rk	Player	Blocks	Seasons
1	Jason Lawson	375	1993–94 1994–95 1995–96 1996–97
2	Ed Pinckney	253	1981–82 1982–83 1983–84 1984–85
3	Tom Greis	237	1986–87 1987–88 1988–89 1989–90
4	Malik Allen	191	1996–97 1997–98 1998–99 1999–00
5	Daniel Ochefu	182	2012–13 2013–14 2014–15 2015–16
6	Jason Fraser	172	2002–03 2003–04 2004–05 2005–06
7	Harold Pressley	152	1982–83 1983–84 1984–85 1985–86
8	Will Sheridan	146	2003–04 2004–05 2005–06 2006–07
9	Dante Cunningham	117	2005–06 2006–07 2007–08 2008–09
10	Brooks Sales	111	1998–99 1999–00 2000–01 2001–02

Season
Rk	Player	Blocks	Season
1	Jason Lawson	105	1996–97
2	Jason Lawson	95	1995–96
3	Jason Lawson	89	1993–94
4	Tom Greis	88	1987–88
5	Jason Lawson	86	1994–95
6	Harold Pressley	83	1985–86
7	Malik Allen	71	1998–99
8	Jason Fraser	67	2004–05
9	Tom Greis	65	1989–90
	Ed Pinckney	65	1982–83

Single game
Rk	Player	Blocks	Season	Opponent
1	Harold Pressley	10	1985–86	Providence
2	Tom Greis	9	1987–88	Georgetown
3	Harold Pressley	8	1985–86	Georgetown
	Jason Lawson	8	1993–94	Georgetown
	Jason Lawson	8	1996–97	West Virginia
	Jason Lawson	8	1996–97	Rutgers
	Malik Allen	8	1998–99	Notre Dame
8	Tom Greis	7	1987–88	Vermont
	Barry Bekkedam	7	1987–88	St. Joseph's
	Jason Lawson	7	1993–94	Boston College
	Jason Lawson	7	1995–96	Delaware
	Jason Lawson	7	1995–96	Seton Hall
	Ron Wilson	7	1993–94	St. John's
	Jason Lawson	7	1996–97	Long Island
	Malik Allen	7	1998–99	Pennsylvania
