= 1994–95 Miami Hurricanes men's basketball team =

American college basketball season

1994–95 Miami Hurricanes men's basketball

NIT, 1st round
- Conference: Atlantic Coast Conference
- Record: 15-13 (9-9 Big East)
- Head coach: Leonard Hamilton
- Home arena: Miami Arena

1994–95 Big East men's basketball standings
| | Conf. | | | | Overall |
| Team | W | | L | PCT | W | | L | PCT |
|---|---|---|---|---|---|---|---|---|
| No. 8 Connecticut | 16 | – | 2 | .889 | 28 | – | 5 | .848 |
| No. 9 Villanova † | 14 | – | 4 | .778 | 25 | – | 8 | .758 |
| No. 25 Syracuse | 12 | – | 6 | .667 | 20 | – | 10 | .667 |
| No. 22 Georgetown | 11 | – | 7 | .611 | 21 | – | 10 | .677 |
| Miami | 9 | – | 9 | .500 | 15 | – | 13 | .536 |
| Providence | 7 | – | 11 | .389 | 17 | – | 13 | .567 |
| Seton Hall | 7 | – | 11 | .389 | 16 | – | 14 | .533 |
| St. John's | 7 | – | 11 | .389 | 14 | – | 14 | .500 |
| Pittsburgh | 5 | – | 13 | .278 | 10 | – | 18 | .357 |
| Boston College | 2 | – | 16 | .111 | 9 | – | 19 | .321 |
† 1995 Big East tournament winner As of April 3, 1995; Rankings from AP Poll

The 1994–95 Miami Hurricanes men's basketball team represented the University of Miami during the 1994–95 NCAA Division I men's basketball season. The Hurricanes, led by head coach Leonard Hamilton, played their home games at the Miami Arena and were members of the Big East Conference.

On December 28, 1994, Miami lost to UNLV 56–55 in the Orange Bowl Basketball Classic at Miami Arena.

Miami finished the season with a 15–13 record. The Hurricanes were eliminated from the Big East tournament first round by Georgetown 69–58. They were eliminated from the 1995 NIT first round by Penn State 62–56.
