= 1995 Big East men's basketball tournament =

- Classification: Division I
- Season: 1994–95
- Teams: 10
- Site: Madison Square Garden; New York City
- Champions: Villanova (1st title)
- Winning coach: Steve Lappas (1st title)
- MVP: Kerry Kittles (Villanova)

1994–95 Big East men's basketball standings
	Conf.				Overall
Team	W		L	PCT	W		L	PCT
No. 8 Connecticut	16	–	2	.889	28	–	5	.848
No. 9 Villanova †	14	–	4	.778	25	–	8	.758
No. 25 Syracuse	12	–	6	.667	20	–	10	.667
No. 22 Georgetown	11	–	7	.611	21	–	10	.677
Miami	9	–	9	.500	15	–	13	.536
Providence	7	–	11	.389	17	–	13	.567
Seton Hall	7	–	11	.389	16	–	14	.533
St. John's	7	–	11	.389	14	–	14	.500
Pittsburgh	5	–	13	.278	10	–	18	.357
Boston College	2	–	16	.111	9	–	19	.321
† 1995 Big East tournament winner As of April 3, 1995; Rankings from AP Poll

The 1995 Big East men's basketball tournament took place at Madison Square Garden in New York City, from March 9 to March 12, 1995. Its winner received the Big East Conference's automatic bid to the 1995 NCAA tournament. It is a single-elimination tournament with four rounds. Connecticut finished with the best regular season conference and was awarded the #1 seed.

Villanova defeated Connecticut, 94–78, in the championship game to claim its first Big East tournament championship.

== Bracket ==
First round March 9, 1995
8	St. John's	71
9	Pittsburgh	74
7	Seton Hall	87
10	Boston College	89^{OT}

Quarterfinals; March 10, 1995
1	#6 Connecticut	81
9	Pittsburgh	78
4	#24 Georgetown	69
5	Miami	58
3	#21 Syracuse	69
6	Providence	71^{OT}
2	#13 Villanova	68
10	Boston College	64

Semifinals; March 11, 1995
1	#6 Connecticut	88
4	#24 Georgetown	81
6	Providence	75
2	#13 Villanova	90

Championship Game; March 12, 1995
1	#6 Connecticut	78
2	#13 Villanova	94

== Awards ==
Dave Gavitt Trophy (Most Valuable Player): Kerry Kittles, Villanova

All Tournament Team

- Danya Abrams, Boston College
- Ray Allen, Connecticut
- Austin Croshere, Providence
- Allen Iverson, Georgetown
- Kerry Kittles, Villanova
- Jason Lawson, Villanova
