= 1994–95 Georgetown Hoyas men's basketball team =

American college basketball season

1994–95 Georgetown Hoyas men's basketball

Sacramento Classic Champions

NCAA tournament, Sweet Sixteen
- Conference: Big East Conference

Ranking
- Coaches: No. 16
- AP: No. 22
- Record: 21–10 (11–7 Big East)
- Head coach: John Thompson (23rd season)
- Assistant coaches: Craig Esherick (13th season); Mike Riley (13th season); Mel Reid (5th season)
- Captain: Don Reid
- Home arena: USAir Arena

1994–95 Big East men's basketball standings
	Conf.				Overall
Team	W		L	PCT	W		L	PCT
No. 8 Connecticut	16	–	2	.889	28	–	5	.848
No. 9 Villanova †	14	–	4	.778	25	–	8	.758
No. 25 Syracuse	12	–	6	.667	20	–	10	.667
No. 22 Georgetown	11	–	7	.611	21	–	10	.677
Miami	9	–	9	.500	15	–	13	.536
Providence	7	–	11	.389	17	–	13	.567
Seton Hall	7	–	11	.389	16	–	14	.533
St. John's	7	–	11	.389	14	–	14	.500
Pittsburgh	5	–	13	.278	10	–	18	.357
Boston College	2	–	16	.111	9	–	19	.321
† 1995 Big East tournament winner As of April 3, 1995; Rankings from AP Poll

The 1994–95 Georgetown Hoyas men's basketball team represented Georgetown University in the 1994–95 NCAA Division I college basketball season. John Thompson, coached them in his 23rd season as head coach. They played their home games at USAir Arena in Landover, Maryland. They were members of the Big East Conference and finished the season with a record of 21–10, 11–7 in Big East play. Their record earned them a bye in the first round of the 1995 Big East men's basketball tournament, and they advanced to the tournament semifinal before losing to Connecticut. They were awarded a No. 6 seed in the Southeast Region of the 1995 NCAA Division I men's basketball tournament – Georgetown's 16th NCAA Tournament appearance in 17 years – and advanced to the Southeast Region Semifinals before losing to region's No. 2 seed, North Carolina. They were ranked No. 22 in the season's final Associated Press Poll and No 16 in the postseason Coaches' Poll.

== Season recap ==
Georgetown's transition from relying on feeding the ball to a "big man" at center to playing an uptempo offense focused on play by the guards continued this year. Senior George Butler had transferred to Georgetown from Tyler Junior College the previous season for his junior year to fill a gap at shooting guard that had hurt the Hoyas in 1992-93 and begin the transition. This season, Allen Iverson joined Butler in the backcourt.

Iverson had been a stand-out in high school, but had been arrested and sentenced to prison for his supposed participation in a February 1993 fight in a bowling alley in Hampton, Virginia. Available evidence in the case ranged from doubtful to strongly suggesting his innocence, and his conviction and sentencing were racially charged. Most colleges and universities abandoned any plans they might have had to recruit Iverson. John Thompson had had a tendency over the years to pass on recruiting troubled players, but he responded to an appeal by Iverson's mother to give Iverson a chance to attend college by agreeing to sign him if he finished high school and if his legal problems were resolved. Virginia Governor Douglas Wilder granted Iverson clemency and Iverson completed high school in time to participate in Georgetown's Jacob Kenner League, a summer basketball league for Georgetown and other Washington, D.C.-area college players played at McDonough Gymnasium on the Georgetown campus, in 1994. On August 4, 1994, in his first game since his February 1993 arrest, he debuted with a 40-point performance, and by the end of the last of three Kenner League games on August 7 he had scored 99 points against some of the area's best college players. In an exhibition game the Hoyas played at McDonough in November 1994 against the Fort Hood Tankers, a United States Army team from Fort Hood, Texas, Iverson electrified the crowd with 36 points, five assists, and three steals in 23 minutes of play, shooting 19-for-21 (90.5%) from the free-throw line; by the time he reached 24 points in the game, he had scored as many points as the entire Fort Hood team. In the second and final exhibition game of the preseason, he scored 39 points against Croatia and again appeared 21 times at the free-throw line.

Iverson's legal troubles and obvious athletic talent focused national attention on him, and he debuted in the regular season with a 19-point game against No. 1-ranked Arkansas in the season opener. Six days later he had 31 points against DePaul, and four days after that he scored 30 points against Providence. He led the team in scoring 22 times and scored in double figures in all but one game, the exception being at Villanova in a game in which he played only ten minutes and Thompson threatened to pull the Hoyas off the court and forfeit after Villanova students mocked Iverson by marching around the arena wearing black-and-white-striped prison uniforms and carrying a sign comparing Iverson to former American football great O. J. Simpson, then under arrest and awaiting trial for murder. After the game, Thompson told the press that the prison taunt was too offensive to tolerate and that he would not hesitate to pull his team off the court if anything like it ever occurred again, and such fan behavior did not recur.

Iverson never scored in less than double figures again in his two-year collegiate career. With President Bill Clinton looking on, he had 26 points in a rematch with ninth-ranked Villanova at USAir Arena in which the Hoyas scored the game's first 11 points, forced 23 Villanova turnovers, had 16 steals, and upset the Wildcats 77–52 on national television. Iverson later had 21 points against Syracuse and 28 points against St. John's. He finished the year averaging 20.4 points per game, second highest in Georgetown history for a first-year varsity player, despite shooting only 39 percent from the field, 23 percent from three-point range, and 19 percent in three-point shots during Big East play.

Fellow guard George Butler also began the season with high-scoring performances, his best of the year being 15 points against Memphis at Maple Leaf Gardens in Toronto, Ontario, Canada, in Georgetown's only regular-season game ever played outside the United States and its territories prior to the opening game of the 2013–14 season. On January 7, 1995, however, he did not suit up for the day's game against Miami at USAir Arena, and Thompson announced after the game that he had been dismissed from the team for academic reasons. He left the team averaging 11.2 points per game for the year. In his one-and-a-half-season, 40-game Georgetown career, he had averaged 13.3 points per game.

Junior center Othella Harrington's role already had diminished the previous season with Thompson's deemphasis of the center in Georgetown's offense in favor of uptempo guard play provided by Butler, and his performance declined further this season with the arrival of Iverson. He nonetheless contributed to Georgetown's scoring, notably with 27 points against 17th-ranked Syracuse in a game at the Carrier Dome in which the Hoyas came back from a 14-point deficit to upset the Orangemen. He averaged 12.2 points and 6.0 rebounds per game in his least successful season, but would enjoy a resurgence the following year.

Junior forward Jerome Williams arrived as a transfer after two years playing for Montgomery College in Montgomery County, Maryland. He started all 31 games and immediately emerged as a top rebounder for the Hoyas, collecting 65 in the first five games, and averaging 31 minutes and 10 rebounds per game for the year. Displaying great defensive prowess, he scored 15 points and had 17 rebounds against DePaul, scored 17 and pulled down 15 rebounds versus Pittsburgh, and scored 11 points and grabbed 14 rebounds versus Connecticut. In the final two games of the regular season, against Seton Hall at USAir Arena and at Madison Square Garden against St. John's, he scored a combined 47 points and had 28 rebounds. He finished the year averaging 10.9 points and 10.0 rebounds a game for the season, becoming the first Georgetown forward to lead the team in rebounding since Reggie Williams.

Senior center and team captain Don Reid led the team in scoring once with a 21-point performance against Morgan State in the second game of the season, and he averaged 7.2 points and 5.7 rebounds a game for the year. Freshman forward Boubacar Aw, meanwhile, played in 30 games, all in a reserve role. He played particularly well against Connecticut late in the year, averaging 15.5 points and five rebounds per game in the final regular-season game against the Huskies and 1995 Big East tournament semifinal game combined.

In the Big East tournament, Georgetown had a bye in the first round and defeated Miami in the quarterfinals behind a 31-point performance by Iverson, who outscored the entire Miami team during the first half. In the semifinals, Connecticut defeated the Hoyas, but Iverson scored 27 points.

Georgetown was the No. 6 seed in the Southeast Region of the 1995 NCAA tournament, and defeated Xavier in the first round. In the second round, Georgetown faced Weber State. The Hoyas had not advanced beyond the second round of the NCAA tournament since the 1988–89 season, losing to its second-round opponent all four times it had gone to the tournament over that span. It looked as though the Hoyas would repeat the pattern when they fouled Weber State's leading scorer, guard Ruben Nembhard, with the score tied 51–51 and eight seconds left in the game. Nembhard missed his first free throw, however, and Iverson sped down the court to put up a shot for the win. It missed, but Reid grabbed the rebound and scored on a layup as time expired to win the game 53–51 in perhaps the highlight of the year. It was Georgetown's first last-second win since 1988, and Thompson was seen performing a courtside victory dance as his players celebrated.

The win allowed Georgetown to advance to meet the Southeast Region's No. 2 seed, 4th-ranked North Carolina, in the region's semifinals. Iverson scored 24 points against the Tar Heels and held North Carolina's sophomore guard Jeff McInnis to a 1-for-8 (12.5%) shooting performance from the field, but North Carolina prevailed to knock Georgetown out of the tournament and bring the Hoyas' season to an end.

Georgetown's December 3, 1994, victory over DePaul began a 14-game Hoya winning streak against the Blue Demons over the next 20 years. DePaul would not finally break the streak until the Blue Demons upset the Hoyas in the first round of the 2014 Big East tournament in March 2014.

== Roster ==
Sophomore reserve guard Brendan Gaughan later became a successful NASCAR driver.

#	Name	Height	Weight (lbs.)	Position	Class	Hometown	Previous Team(s)
3	Allen Iverson	6'0"	165	G	Fr.	Hampton, VA, U.S.	Bethel HS
4	John Jacques	6'3"	175	F	Sr.	Delco, NC, U.S.	Acme-Delco HS
10	Eric Myles	5'10"	185	G	Fr.	Napoleonville, LA, U.S.	Assumption HS
11	Irvin Church	6'1"	185	G	Sr.	Parkdale, MD, U.S.	Parkdale HS
12	Dean Berry	5'10"	168	G	Fr.	Brooklyn, NY, U.S.	Episcopal HS
13	Brendan Gaughan	5'9"	180	G/F	So.	Las Vegas, NV, U.S.	Bishop Gorman HS
22	Boubacar Aw	6'7"	195	F	Fr.	Thiès, Senegal	East Columbus HS (Lake Waccamaw, NC)
25	Jerry Nichols	6'4"	210	G/F	Fr.	Jackson, MS, U.S.	Lanier HS
30	George Butler	6'2"	225	G	Sr.	Gary, IN, U.S.	Tyler Junior College (Texas) Lamar University
32	Kevin Millen	6'6"	185	F	Sr.	Memphis, TN, U.S.	Raleigh-Egypt HS
42	Jerome Williams	6'9"	200	F	Jr.	Germantown, Maryland, U.S.	Colonel Zadok A. Magruder HS Montgomery County Community College (Maryland)
44	Cheikh Ya-Ya Dia	6'9"	210	F/C	So.	Dakar, Senegal	St. John's Prep-Prospect Hall (Maryland)
50	Othella Harrington	6'9"	240	C	Jr.	Jackson, MS, U.S.	Murrah HS
52	Don Reid	6'8"	270	F	Sr.	Largo, MD, U.S.	Largo HS
55	Jahidi White	6'9"	270	C	Fr.	St. Louis, MO, U.S.	Cardinal Ritter College Prep HS

== Rankings ==
Ranking movement Legend: ██ Improvement in ranking. ██ Decrease in ranking. ██ Not ranked the previous week. RV=Others receiving votes.
Poll	Pre	Wk 1	Wk 2	Wk 3	Wk 4	Wk 5	Wk 6	Wk 7	Wk 8	Wk 9	Wk 10	Wk 11	Wk 12	Wk 13	Wk 14	Wk 15	Wk 16	Final	Post
AP	15	14	19	18	15	12	12	12	10	10	14	13	20			23	24	22	– (Note: No Associated Press Poll this week.)
Coaches	N/A	N/A	N/A	N/A	N/A	N/A	N/A	N/A	N/A	N/A	N/A	N/A	N/A	N/A	N/A	N/A	N/A		16

== 1994–95 Schedule and results ==
Sources

- All times are Eastern

Date time, TV	Rank^{#}	Opponent^{#}	Result	Record	Site (attendance) city, state
Preseason
Tue., Nov. 8, 1994	No. 14	Fort Hood (U.S. Army)	W 101−58	exhibition	McDonough Gymnasium (N/A); Washington, DC
November 1994 (Note: Sources do not provide an exact date for this game, but it occurred after the Fort Hood game.)	No. 14	Croatia	W 89−83	exhibition	McDonough Gymnasium (N/A); Washington, DC
Regular Season
Sun., Nov. 27, 1994*; CBS	No. 14	vs. No. 1 Arkansas	L 79−97	0–1	Pyramid Arena (18,245); Memphis, TN
Wed., Nov. 30, 1994*	No. 19	Morgan State	W 99−63	1–1	USAir Arena (8,109); Landover, MD
Sat., Dec. 3, 1994*	No. 19	DePaul	W 74−68	2–1	USAir Arena (N/A); Landover, MD
Wed., Dec. 7, 1994	No. 18	Providence	W 76−74	3–1 (1–0)	USAir Arena (8,657); Landover, MD
Sat., Dec. 10, 1994*	No. 18	vs. Memphis	W 83−80 ^{OT}	4–1	Maple Leaf Gardens (10,830); Toronto, Ontario, Canada
Sat., Dec. 17, 1994*	No. 15	Maryland Eastern Shore	W 85−46	5–1	USAir Arena (8,367); Landover, MD
Wed., Dec. 28, 1994*	No. 12	vs. Grambling State; Sacramento Classic	W 83–66	6–1	ARCO Arena (8,989); Sacramento, CA
Thu., Dec. 29, 1994*	No. 12	vs. Fairfield; Sacramento Classic	W 87–42	7–1	ARCO Arena (8,190); Sacramento, CA
Wed., Jan. 3, 1995	No. 12	at Pittsburgh	W 55−46	8–1 (2–0)	Civic Arena (10,296); Pittsburgh, PA
Sat., Jan. 7, 1995	No. 12	Miami	W 71–64	9–1 (3–0)	USAir Arena (10,551); Landover, MD
Tue., Jan. 10, 1995	No. 10	at Seton Hall	W 80−68	10–1 (4–0)	Brendan Byrne Arena (11,541); East Rutherford, NJ
Sat., Jan. 14, 1995	No. 10	Boston College	W 75−60	11–1 (5–0)	USAir Arena (11,558); Landover, MD
Mon., Jan. 16, 1995	No. 10	at No. 2 Connecticut; Rivalry	L 73–93	11–2 (5–1)	Hartford Civic Center (16,294); Hartford, CT
Thu., Jan. 19, 1995*	No. 10	Florida Atlantic	W 70–55	12–2	USAir Arena (8,466); Landover, MD
Sun., Jan. 22, 1995; CBS	No. 10	at Villanova	L 60–66	12–3 (5–2)	Spectrum (17,332); Philadelphia, PA
Tue., Jan. 24, 1995	No. 14	St. John's	W 88–71	13–3 (6–2)	USAir Arena (12,081); Landover, MD
Sat., Jan. 28, 1995	No. 14	Pittsburgh	W 74–69	14–3 (7–2)	USAir Arena (14,101); Landover, MD
Mon., Jan. 30, 1995; 7:30 p.m.	No. 14	No. 6 Syracuse; Rivalry	L 75–76	14–4 (7–3)	USAir Arena (16,352); Landover, MD
Sat., Feb. 4, 1995	No. 13	at Miami	L 61–67	14−5 (7–4)	Miami Arena (5,084); Miami, FL
Wed., Feb. 8, 1995	No. 20	at Boston College	L 67–78	14−6 (7–5)	Silvio O. Conte Forum (8,606); Chestnut Hill, MA
Tue., Feb. 14, 1995		No. 1 Connecticut; Rivalry	L 85–91	14–7 (7–6)	USAir Arena (17,690); Landover, MD
Sat., Feb. 18, 1995		at Providence	W 77–74	15–7 (8–6)	Providence Civic Center (13,106); Providence, RI
Mon., Feb. 20, 1995		No. 9 Villanova	W 77–52	16–7 (9–6)	USAir Arena (17,969); Landover, MD
Sun., Feb. 26, 1995; 2:08 p.m., CBS		at No. 17 Syracuse; Rivalry	W 81–78	17–7 (10–6)	Carrier Dome (31,143); Syracuse, NY
Wed., Mar. 1, 1995	No. 23	Seton Hall	W 96–92	18–7 (11–6)	USAir Arena (15,012); Landover, MD
Sun., Mar. 5, 1995; CBS	No. 23	at St. John's	L 77–86	18–8 (11–7)	Madison Square Garden (17,238); New York, NY
Big East tournament
Fri., Mar. 10, 1995	No. 24	vs. Miami; Quarterfinal	W 69–58	19–8	Madison Square Garden (19,554); New York, NY
Sat., Mar. 11, 1995	No. 24	vs. No. 6 Connecticut; Semifinal/Rivalry	L 81–88	19–9	Madison Square Garden (19,554); New York, NY
NCAA tournament
Fri., Mar. 17, 1995; CBS	No. 22	vs. Xavier; Southeast Regional First round	W 68–63	20–9	Leon County Civic Center (7,875); Tallahassee, FL
Sun., Mar. 19, 1995; CBS	No. 22	vs. Weber State; Southeast Regional Second Round	W 53–51	21–9	Leon County Civic Center (7,875); Tallahassee, FL
Sat., Mar. 25, 1995; CBS	No. 22	vs. No. 4 North Carolina; Southeast Regional semifinal	L 64–74	21–10	Birmingham–Jefferson Civic Center (17,458); Birmingham, AL
*Non-conference game. ^{#}Rankings from AP Poll. (#) Tournament seedings in parentheses.
