= Jim Huggard =

American basketball player

Personal information
- Born: September 16, 1933
- Died: October 16, 2020 (aged 87) Newtown Square, Pennsylvania, U.S.
- Listed height: 5 ft 10 in (1.78 m)

Career information
- High school: West Catholic Prep (Philadelphia, Pennsylvania)
- College: Villanova (1958–1961)
- NBA draft: 1961: undrafted
- Playing career: 1961–1966
- Position: Point guard

Career history

Playing
- 1961–1963: Sunbury Mercuries
- 1963–1965: Scranton Miners
- 1965–1966: Harrisburg Patriots

Coaching
- 1978–1980: Monsignor Bonner HS

Career highlights
- All-EPBL Second Team (1962); EPBL Rookie of the Year (1962)

James Huggard (September 16, 1933 – October 16, 2020) was an American professional basketball player and coach. He played college basketball for the Villanova Wildcats and professionally in the Eastern Professional Basketball League.

== Playing career ==
Huggard attended West Catholic Preparatory High School in Philadelphia, Pennsylvania, but did not play on the school basketball team due to his height of 5 ft 4 in (1.63 m). After his graduation, he grew several inches and gained attention while playing in local Amateur Athletic Union (AAU) circles. Huggard earned numerous scholarships and committed to play for the Villanova Wildcats. He was a member of an undefeated Wildcats junior varsity team during the 1957–58 season.

Huggard played for three seasons with the Wildcats from 1958 to 1961. He became a key player as a sophomore when he averaged 15.2 points per game and helped lead the Wildcats to an appearance in the 1959 National Invitation Tournament. Huggard averaged 15 points per game as a junior while the Wildcats qualified for the 1960 National Invitation Tournament. He averaged a career-high 17.3 points per game as a senior. Huggard totaled 1,184 points during his Wildcats career and was one of the program's first 1,000 point scorers. He set a Wildcats record for assists in a game with 16 which is a feat shared with Fran O'Hanlon.

Huggard played professionally in the Eastern Professional Basketball League (EPBL) from 1961 to 1966 with the Sunbury Mercuries, Scranton Miners and Harrisburg Patriots. He was selected to the all-EPBL second team and named as the EPBL rookie of the year while playing for the Mercuries in 1962. Huggard led the league in assists twice: 231 in 1963–64, and 256 in 1965–66.

== Post-playing career ==
Huggard worked as an NCAA Division I referee and basketball coach after his retirement from playing. He was the head coach of the basketball team at Monsignor Bonner High School from 1978 to 1980 and acquired a 12–16 record.

== Personal life ==
Huggard was married for 30 years and had one daughter and two stepchildren. His granddaughter, Shannon Drakeley, played field hockey for the Villanova Wildcats.

Huggard died at his home in Newtown Square, Pennsylvania, on October 16, 2020. Wildcats head coach Jay Wright called him "the original tough, Philly Villanova guard" in an announcement of his death.
