= 1994–95 Connecticut Huskies men's basketball team =

American college basketball season

1994–95 Connecticut Huskies men's basketball

Big East Regular Season Champions

NCAA men's Division I tournament, Elite Eight
- Conference: Big East Conference

Ranking
- Coaches: No. 6
- AP: No. 8
- Record: 28–5 (16–2 Big East)
- Head coach: Jim Calhoun (9th season)
- Assistant coaches: Howie Dickenman; Karl Hobbs; Tom Moore
- Home arena: Hartford Civic Center; Harry A. Gampel Pavilion

1994–95 Big East men's basketball standings
	Conf.				Overall
Team	W		L	PCT	W		L	PCT
No. 8 Connecticut	16	–	2	.889	28	–	5	.848
No. 9 Villanova †	14	–	4	.778	25	–	8	.758
No. 25 Syracuse	12	–	6	.667	20	–	10	.667
No. 22 Georgetown	11	–	7	.611	21	–	10	.677
Miami	9	–	9	.500	15	–	13	.536
Providence	7	–	11	.389	17	–	13	.567
Seton Hall	7	–	11	.389	16	–	14	.533
St. John's	7	–	11	.389	14	–	14	.500
Pittsburgh	5	–	13	.278	10	–	18	.357
Boston College	2	–	16	.111	9	–	19	.321
† 1995 Big East tournament winner As of April 3, 1995; Rankings from AP Poll

The 1994–95 Connecticut Huskies men's basketball team represented the University of Connecticut in the 1994–95 collegiate men's basketball season. The Huskies completed the season with a 28–5 overall record. The Huskies were members of the Big East Conference where they finished with a 16–2 record and were the Regular Season Champions. Connecticut made it to the Elite Eight in the 1995 NCAA Division I men's basketball tournament before losing to the UCLA Bruins 102–96.

The Huskies played their home games at Harry A. Gampel Pavilion in Storrs, Connecticut and the Hartford Civic Center in Hartford, Connecticut, and they were led by ninth-year head coach Jim Calhoun.

== Schedule ==
Date time, TV	Rank^{#}	Opponent^{#}	Result	Record	Site (attendance) city, state
Regular Season
11/25/1994*	No. 16	Lafayette	W 110–48	1–0	Hartford Civic Center (15,847); Hartford, Connecticut
11/29/1994*; ESPN	No. 16	vs. No. 8 Duke; Great Eight Basketball Tournament	W 90–86	2–0	The Palace (17,264); Auburn Hills, Michigan
12/2/1994*; WTNH	No. 16	Yale	W 105–53	3–0	Hartford Civic Center (15,931); Hartford, Connecticut
12/6/1994; WTNH	No. 10	at Boston College	W 74–70	4–0 (1–0)	Conte Forum (8,606); Boston
12/23/1994*	No. 10	Fairfield	W 85–68	5–0	Hartford Civic Center (16,294); Hartford, Connecticut
12/27/1994*; WTNH	No. 8	Illinois	W 71–56	6–0	Hartford Civic Center (16,294); Hartford, Connecticut
12/30/1994*	No. 6	Northeastern	W 88–70	7–0	Hartford Civic Center (16,294); Hartford, Connecticut
1/3/1995; WTNH	No. 6	at Villanova	W 77–62	8–0 (2–0)	The Pavilion (6,500); Villanova, Pennsylvania
1/5/1995*	No. 6	Hartford	W 102–77	9–0	Harry A. Gampel Pavilion (8,241); Storrs, Connecticut
1/8/1995; CBS	No. 2	St. John's	W 98–78	10–0 (3–0)	Hartford Civic Center (16,294); Hartford, Connecticut
1/11/1995; WTNH	No. 2	at Pittsburgh	W 85–76	11–0 (4–0)	Civic Arena (6,798); Pittsburgh, Pennsylvania
1/13/1995; WTNH	No. 2	Providence	W 70–62	12–0 (5–0)	Harry A. Gampel Pavilion (8,241); Storrs, Connecticut
1/16/1995; ESPN	No. 2	No. 10 Georgetown; Rivalry	W 93–73	13–0 (6–0)	Hartford Civic Center (16,294); Hartford, Connecticut
1/21/1995; WTNH	No. 2	at Seton Hall	W 86–81	14–0 (7–0)	Brendan Byrne Arena (17,049); East Rutherford, New Jersey
1/23/1995; ESPN	No. 2	No. 6 Syracuse; Rivalry	W 86–75	15–0 (8–0)	Harry A. Gampel Pavilion (8,241); Storrs, Connecticut
1/28/1995*; CBS	No. 4	vs. No. 7 Kansas	L 59–88	15–1	Kemper Arena (16,981); Kansas City, Missouri
1/31/1995; WTNH	No. 4	Miami	W 82–57	16–1 (9–0)	Hartford Civic Center (16,294); Hartford, Connecticut
2/4/1995; WTNH	No. 3	at St. John's	W 99–82	17–1 (10–0)	Madison Square Garden (19,542); New York City
2/6/1995; ESPN	No. 3	Pittsburgh	W 90–61	18–1 (11–0)	Harry A. Gampel Pavilion (8,241); Storrs, Connecticut
2/12/1995; CBS	No. 1	at No. 9 Syracuse; Rivalry	W 77–70	19–1 (12–0)	Carrier Dome (31,211); Syracuse, New York
2/14/1995; WTNH	No. 1	at No. 22 Georgetown; Rivalry	W 91–85	20–1 (13–0)	Capital Centre (17,690); Landover, Maryland
2/18/1995; CBS	No. 4	No. 15 Villanova	L 73–96	20–2 (13–1)	Harry A. Gampel Pavilion (8,241); Storrs, Connecticut
2/21/1995; WTNH	No. 4	Boston College	W 88–75	21–2 (14–1)	Hartford Civic Center (16,294); Hartford, Connecticut
2/25/1995; WTNH	No. 4	Seton Hall	W 75–61	22–2 (15–1)	Harry A. Gampel Pavilion (8,241); Storrs, Connecticut
2/27/1995; ESPN	No. 4	at Providence	L 70–72	22–3 (15–2)	Providence Civic Center (13,106); Providence, Rhode Island
3/4/1995; WTNH	No. 6	at Miami	W 75–67	23–3 (16–2)	Miami Arena (11,263); Miami, Florida
Big East tournament
3/10/1995; WTNH	No. 6	vs. Pittsburgh; Quarterfinals	W 81–78	24–3	Madison Square Garden (19,544); New York
3/11/1995; CBS	No. 6	vs. No. 22 Georgetown; Semifinals/Rivalry	W 88–81	25–3	Madison Square Garden (19,544); New York
3/12/1995; CBS	No. 8	vs. No. 10 Villanova; Championship	L 78–94	25–4	Madison Square Garden (19,544); New York
NCAA tournament
3/16/1995*; CBS	(2 W) No. 8	vs. (15 W) Chattanooga; First Round	W 100–71	26–4	Jon M. Huntsman Center (11,790); Salt Lake City
3/18/1995*; CBS	(2 W) No. 8	vs. (7 W) Cincinnati; Second Round	W 96–91	27–4	Jon M. Huntsman Center (13,521); Salt Lake City
3/23/1995*; CBS	(2 W) No. 8	vs. (3 W) No. 10 Maryland; Sweet Sixteen	W 99–89	28–4	Oakland–Alameda County Coliseum Arena (14,399); Oakland, California
3/25/1995*; CBS	(2 W) No. 8	vs. (1 W) No. 1 UCLA; Elite Eight	L 96–102	28–5	Oakland–Alameda County Coliseum Arena (14,399); Oakland, California
*Non-conference game. ^{#}Rankings from AP poll. (#) Tournament seedings in parentheses. W=West. All times are in Eastern Time.

Schedule Source:
