= 1994–95 St. John's Red Storm men's basketball team =

American college basketball season

1994–1995 St. John's Red Storm men's basketball

Lapchick Memorial Champions

National Invitation Tournament, First Round
- Conference: Big East Conference (1979–2013)
- Record: 14–14 (7–11 Big East)
- Head coach: Brian Mahoney
- Assistant coaches: Al LoBalbo; Ron Rutledge; George Felton
- Home arena: Alumni Hall; Madison Square Garden

1994–95 Big East men's basketball standings
	Conf.				Overall
Team	W		L	PCT	W		L	PCT
No. 8 Connecticut	16	–	2	.889	28	–	5	.848
No. 9 Villanova †	14	–	4	.778	25	–	8	.758
No. 25 Syracuse	12	–	6	.667	20	–	10	.667
No. 22 Georgetown	11	–	7	.611	21	–	10	.677
Miami	9	–	9	.500	15	–	13	.536
Providence	7	–	11	.389	17	–	13	.567
Seton Hall	7	–	11	.389	16	–	14	.533
St. John's	7	–	11	.389	14	–	14	.500
Pittsburgh	5	–	13	.278	10	–	18	.357
Boston College	2	–	16	.111	9	–	19	.321
† 1995 Big East tournament winner As of April 3, 1995; Rankings from AP Poll

The 1994–95 St. John's Red Storm men's basketball team represented St. John's University during the 1994–95 NCAA Division I men's basketball season. The team was coached by Brian Mahoney in his third year at the school. St. John's home games are played at Alumni Hall and Madison Square Garden and the team is a member of the Big East Conference. This was the first season for the team as the Red Storm.

== Off season ==
=== Departures ===
Name	Number	Pos.	Height	Weight	Year	Hometown	Notes
Lee Green	13	G	6'2"		Senior		Graduated
Carl Beckett	30	G			Senior		Graduated
Shawnelle Scott	42	C	610"		Senior		Graduated. Entered 1994 NBA draft

=== Class of 1994 signees ===
College recruiting information
Name	Hometown	School	Height	Weight	Commit date
Felipe López; SG	Santo Domingo, Dominican Republic	Rice High School	6 ft 5 in (1.96 m)	N/A	
Felipe López; SG	Recruit ratings: No ratings found				
Zendon Hamilton; C	Floral Park, NY	Sewanhaka High School	6 ft 9 in (2.06 m)	N/A	
Zendon Hamilton; C	Recruit ratings: No ratings found				
Tarik Turner; PG	Charlottesville, VA	Oak Hill Academy	6 ft 5 in (1.96 m)	N/A	
Tarik Turner; PG	Recruit ratings: No ratings found				
Overall recruit ranking:
Note: In many cases, Scout, Rivals, 247Sports, On3, and ESPN may conflict in their listings of height and weight.; In these cases, the average was taken. ESPN grades are on a 100-point scale.; Sources: "1994 Team Ranking". Rivals.

== Roster ==
1994–95 St. John's Red Storm men's basketball team
Players
Coaches

Pos.	#	Name	Height	Weight	Year	Previous school	Hometown
F	3	Sergio Luyk	6 ft 7 in (2.01 m)	—	RS Sr	University Heights	Madrid, Spain
G	5	Maurice Brown	5 ft 9 in (1.75 m)	—	Jr	William E. Grady	Brooklyn, NY
G	11	Tarik Turner	6 ft 5 in (1.96 m)	—	Fr	Oak Hill	Charlottesville, VA
G	13	Felipe López	6 ft 5 in (1.96 m)	—	Fr	Rice	Santo Domingo, D.R.
F	22	Thomas Bayne	6 ft 10 in (2.08 m)	—	Jr	Brentwood	Brentwood, NY
G	23	Derek Brown (redshirt)	6 ft 3 in (1.91 m)	—	Sr	H. Frank Carey	Franklin Square, NY
G	24	Rowan Barrett	6 ft 5 in (1.96 m)	—	Jr	West Hill	Scarborough, Ontario
C	31	Zendon Hamilton	6 ft 9 in (2.06 m)	—	Fr	Sewanhaka	Floral Park, NY
G/F	32	James Scott	6 ft 6 in (1.98 m)	—	Sr	Eastside/Spartanburg Methodist	Paterson, NJ
F	33	Roshown McLeod	6 ft 8 in (2.03 m)	—	So	St. Anthony's	Jersey City, NJ
F	34	Charles Minlend	6 ft 6 in (1.98 m)	—	Jr	St. Thomas More	Cameroon, Africa
G/F	44	Fred Lyson (redshirt)	6 ft 7 in (2.01 m)	—	Jr	Oceanside	Oceanside, NY

Head coach

- Brian Mahoney (Manhattan)

Assistant coach(es)

- Al LoBalbo
- Ron Rutledge
- George Felton

Legend

- (C) Team captain
- (S) Suspended
- (I) Ineligible
- (W) Walk-on
- Injured
- Current redshirt

== Schedule and results ==
Date time, TV	Rank^{#}	Opponent^{#}	Result	Record	Site city, state
Regular season
11/25/94*		Dartmouth; Lapchick Tournament Opening Round	W 93-63	1-0	Alumni Hall; Queens, NY
11/26/94*		Bowling Green State; Lapchick Tournament Championship	W 77-64	2-0	Alumni Hall; Queens, NY
11/30/94*		Coppin State	W 78-73	3-0	Alumni Hall; Queens, NY
12/03/94*		at Niagara	W 89-56	4-0	Gallagher Center; Niagara, NY
12/05/94		at Pittsburgh	W 88-83	5-0 (1-0)	Pittsburgh Civic Arena; Pittsburgh, PA
12/22/94*		Fordham	W 76-65	6-0	Alumni Hall; Queens, NY
12/27/94*	No. 25	vs. Manhattan; ECAC Holiday Festival Semifinal	W 81-70	7-0	Madison Square Garden; New York, NY
12/28/94*	No. 25	vs. Pennsylvania; ECAC Holiday Festival Championship	L 73-79	7-1	Madison Square Garden; New York, NY
01/04/95		at Providence	W 89-74	8-1 (2-0)	Providence Civic Center; Providence, RI
01/08/95		at No. 6 Connecticut	L 78-98	8-2 (2-1)	Hartford Civic Center; Hartford, CT
01/11/95		Miami (F.L.)	L 79-82	8-3 (2-2)	Alumni Hall; Queens, NY
01/14/95		Seton Hall	L 81-91	8-4 (2-3)	Madison Square Garden; New York, NY
01/17/95		at No. 6 Syracuse	L 87-91	8-5 (2-4)	Carrier Dome; Syracuse, NY
01/22/95		Pittsburgh	L 87-94	8-6 (2-5)	Madison Square Garden; New York, NY
01/24/95		at No. 14 Georgetown	L 71-88	8-7 (2-6)	USAir Arena; Landover, MD
01/29/95*		at Michigan	W 82-77	9-7	Crisler Arena; Ann Arbor, MI
02/01/95		No. 19 Villanova	L 62-78	9-8 (2-7)	Madison Square Garden; New York, NY
02/04/95		No. 4 Connecticut	L 82-99	9-9 (2-8)	Madison Square Garden; New York, NY
02/07/95		at Seton Hall	L 87-90	9-10 (2-9)	Brendan Byrne Arena; East Rutherford, NJ
02/11/95		Boston College	W 81-71	10-10 (3-9)	Alumni Hall; Queens, NY
02/13/95		at Miami (F.L.)	L 69-71	10-11 (3-10)	Miami Arena; Miami, FL
02/18/95		Boston College	W 73-69	11-11 (4-10)	Silvio O. Conte Forum; Chestnut Hill, MA
02/22/95		Providence	W 79-72	12-11 (5-10)	Madison Square Garden; New York, NY
02/25/95		No. 9 Villanova	L 70-74	12-12 (5-11)	duPont Pavilion; New York, NY
03/01/95		No. 22 Syracuse	W 82-78	13-12 (6-11)	Madison Square Garden; New York, NY
03/05/95		No. 23 Georgetown	W 86-77	14-12 (7-11)	Madison Square Garden; New York, NY
Big East tournament
03/09/95		vs. Pittsburgh; Big East tournament first round	L 71-74	14-13 (7-11)	Madison Square Garden; New York, NY
NIT
03/16/95		vs. South Florida; NIT First Round	L 67-74	14-14 (7-11)	USF Sun Dome; Tampa, FL
*Non-conference game. ^{#}Rankings from AP Poll. (#) Tournament seedings in parentheses.
