= 1994–95 Syracuse Orangemen basketball team =

American college basketball season

1994–95 Syracuse Orangemen basketball

NCAA tournament, second round
- Conference: Big East Conference

Ranking
- AP: No. 25
- Record: 20–10 (12–6 Big East)
- Head coach: Jim Boeheim (19th season)
- Assistant coaches: Bernie Fine (19th season); Wayne Morgan (11th season); Tim O'Toole
- Home arena: Carrier Dome

1994–95 Big East men's basketball standings
	Conf.				Overall
Team	W		L	PCT	W		L	PCT
No. 8 Connecticut	16	–	2	.889	28	–	5	.848
No. 9 Villanova †	14	–	4	.778	25	–	8	.758
No. 25 Syracuse	12	–	6	.667	20	–	10	.667
No. 22 Georgetown	11	–	7	.611	21	–	10	.677
Miami	9	–	9	.500	15	–	13	.536
Providence	7	–	11	.389	17	–	13	.567
Seton Hall	7	–	11	.389	16	–	14	.533
St. John's	7	–	11	.389	14	–	14	.500
Pittsburgh	5	–	13	.278	10	–	18	.357
Boston College	2	–	16	.111	9	–	19	.321
† 1995 Big East tournament winner As of April 3, 1995; Rankings from AP Poll

The 1994–95 Syracuse Orangemen basketball team represented Syracuse University as a member of the Big East Conference during the 1994–95 NCAA Division I men's basketball season. The head coach was Jim Boeheim, serving for his 19th year. The team played home games at the Carrier Dome in Syracuse, New York. They defeated Southern Illinois in the first round of the NCAA tournament and advanced to second round before losing to eventual National Runner-up Arkansas, 96–94 in overtime. Syracuse finished with a 20–10 (12–6 Big East) record.

== Roster ==
1994–95 Syracuse Orange men's basketball team
Players
Coaches

Pos.	#	Name	Height	Weight	Year	Hometown
C	4	Otis Hill	6 ft 8 in (2.03 m)	235 lb (107 kg)	So	White Plains, New York
SG	21	Lawrence Moten	6 ft 5 in (1.96 m)	180 lb (82 kg)	Sr	Washington, D.C.
G/F	34	Lucious Jackson	6 ft 6 in (1.98 m)	205 lb (93 kg)	Sr	Beaumont, Texas
SF	44	John Wallace	6 ft 8 in (2.03 m)	215 lb (98 kg)	Jr	Rochester, New York

Head coach

- Jim Boeheim (Syracuse)

Assistant coach(es)

- Bernie Fine (Syracuse)
- Wayne Morgan (St. Lawrence)
- Tim O'Toole (Fairfield)

Legend

- (C) Team captain
- (S) Suspended
- (I) Ineligible
- (W) Walk-on
- Injured
- Current redshirt

Roster

== Schedule and results ==
Date time, TV	Rank^{#}	Opponent^{#}	Result	Record	Site city, state
Regular Season
Nov 16, 1994*	No. 8	George Washington	L 104–111 ^{OT}	0–1	Carrier Dome; Syracuse, New York
Nov 29, 1994*	No. 22	Colgate	W 88–53	1–1	Carrier Dome; Syracuse, New York
Dec 2, 1994*	No. 22	Kent State	W 83–50	2–1	Carrier Dome; Syracuse, New York
Dec 3, 1994*	No. 22	Davidson	W 89–66	3–1	Carrier Dome; Syracuse, New York
Dec 6, 1994	No. 19	at Miami (FL)	W 83–65	4–1 (1–0)	Miami Arena; Miami, Florida
Dec 17, 1994*	No. 16	Princeton	W 67–65 ^{OT}	5–1	Carrier Dome; Syracuse, New York
Dec 19, 1994*	No. 14	Robert Morris	W 103–67	6–1	Carrier Dome; Syracuse, New York
Dec 22, 1994*	No. 14	No. 6 Arizona	W 94–84	7–1	Carrier Dome; Syracuse, New York
Dec 29, 1994*	No. 11	Le Moyne	W 94–54	8–1	Carrier Dome; Syracuse, New York
Jan 3, 1995	No. 10	at Boston College	W 81–72	9–1 (2–0)	Silvio O. Conte Forum; Boston, Massachusetts
Jan 7, 1995	No. 10	Seton Hall	W 89–77	10–1 (3–0)	Carrier Dome; Syracuse, New York
Jan 9, 1995	No. 8	Villanova	W 61–60	11–1 (4–0)	Carrier Dome; Syracuse, New York
Jan 14, 1995	No. 8	at Pittsburgh	W 65–63	12–1 (5–0)	Fitzgerald Field House; Pittsburgh, Pennsylvania
Jan 17, 1995	No. 6	St. John's	W 91–87	13–1 (6–0)	Carrier Dome; Syracuse, New York
Jan 21, 1995	No. 6	at Providence	W 60–59	14–1 (7–0)	Providence Civic Center; Providence, Rhode Island
Jan 23, 1995	No. 6	at No. 2 Connecticut; Rivalry	L 75–86	14–2 (7–1)	Gampel Pavilion; Storrs, Connecticut
Jan 28, 1995	No. 6	Miami (FL)	W 76–51	15–2 (8–1)	Carrier Dome; Syracuse, New York
Jan 30, 1995	No. 10	at No. 13 Georgetown; Rivalry	W 76–75	16–2 (9–1)	Capital Centre; Landover, Maryland
Feb 5, 1995*	No. 10	at No. 6 Kentucky	L 71–77	16–3	Rupp Arena; Lexington, Kentucky
Feb 8, 1995	No. 10	Providence	W 100–76	17–3 (10–1)	Carrier Dome; Syracuse, New York
Feb 12, 1995	No. 10	No. 3 Connecticut	L 70–77	17–4 (10–2)	Carrier Dome; Syracuse, New York
Big East tournament
Mar 10, 1995*	(3) No. 21	vs. (6) Providence; Quarterfinals	L 69–71 ^{OT}	19–9	Madison Square Garden; New York, New York
NCAA tournament
Mar 17, 1995*	(7 MW) No. 25	vs. (10 MW) Southern Illinois; First Round	W 96–92	20–9	Frank Erwin Center; Austin, Texas
Mar 19, 1995*	(7 MW) No. 25	vs. (2 MW) No. 6 Arkansas; Second Round	L 94–96 ^{OT}	20–10	Frank Erwin Center; Austin, Texas
*Non-conference game. ^{#}Rankings from AP poll. (#) Tournament seedings in parentheses. MW=Midwest. All times are in Eastern Time.
