= Jim Mooney (basketball) =

American basketball player

Personal information
- Born: July 8, 1930 Philadelphia, Pennsylvania, U.S.
- Died: October 29, 2015 (aged 85) Upland, Pennsylvania, U.S.
- Listed height: 6 ft 5 in (1.96 m)
- Listed weight: 215 lb (98 kg)

Career information
- High school: John Bartram (Philadelphia, Pennsylvania)
- College: Villanova (1950–1953)
- NBA draft: 1953: undrafted
- Position: Small forward
- Number: 7

Career history
- 1953: Philadelphia Warriors
- Stats at NBA.com
- Stats at Basketball Reference

James J. Mooney (July 8, 1930 – October 29, 2015) was an American professional basketball player. He set Villanova's still-standing sophomore year rebounding record with 455.

Mooney signed with the Philadelphia Warriors during the 1952–53 NBA season and made his debut on February 8, 1953. In 18 career games, he averaged 7.5 points, 3.9 rebounds, and 1.9 assists per game. Mooney, Villanova's team captain, signed with the Warriors after being declared ineligible to continue playing for Villanova in early February 1953. He would play the remainder of the season before joining the United States Marine Corps.

== Career statistics ==
Legend
GP	Games played	GS	Games started	MPG	Minutes per game
FG%	Field goal percentage	3P%	3-point field goal percentage	FT%	Free throw percentage
RPG	Rebounds per game	APG	Assists per game	SPG	Steals per game
BPG	Blocks per game	PPG	Points per game	**Bold**	Career high

=== NBA ===
==== Regular season ====
Year	Team	GP	MPG	FG%	FT%	RPG	APG	PPG
1952–53	Philadelphia	18	29.4	.365	.675	3.9	1.9	7.5
