= 1994–95 Villanova Wildcats men's basketball team =

American college basketball season

1994–95 Villanova Wildcats men's basketball

Big East tournament champions

NCAA tournament, Round of 64
- Conference: Big East Conference

Ranking
- Coaches: No. 23
- AP: No. 9
- Record: 25–8 (14–4 Big East)
- Head coach: Steve Lappas (3rd season)
- Home arena: John Eleuthère du Pont Pavilion (Capacity: 6,500)

1994–95 Big East men's basketball standings
	Conf.				Overall
Team	W		L	PCT	W		L	PCT
No. 8 Connecticut	16	–	2	.889	28	–	5	.848
No. 9 Villanova †	14	–	4	.778	25	–	8	.758
No. 25 Syracuse	12	–	6	.667	20	–	10	.667
No. 22 Georgetown	11	–	7	.611	21	–	10	.677
Miami	9	–	9	.500	15	–	13	.536
Providence	7	–	11	.389	17	–	13	.567
Seton Hall	7	–	11	.389	16	–	14	.533
St. John's	7	–	11	.389	14	–	14	.500
Pittsburgh	5	–	13	.278	10	–	18	.357
Boston College	2	–	16	.111	9	–	19	.321
† 1995 Big East tournament winner As of April 3, 1995; Rankings from AP Poll

The 1994–95 Villanova Wildcats men's basketball team represented Villanova University in the 1994–95 season. The head coach was Steve Lappas. The team played its home games at The Pavilion in Villanova, Pennsylvania, and was a member of the Big East Conference.

== Roster ==
1994–95 Villanova Wildcats men's basketball team
Players
Coaches

Pos.	#	Name	Height	Weight	Year	Hometown
G	12	Kevin Cox	6 ft 3 in (1.91 m)	—	Sr
F		Eric Eberz	6 ft 7 in (2.01 m)	—	Jr
F		Jaime Gregg	6 ft 8 in (2.03 m)	—	Jr
G	4	Roscoe Harris	6 ft 4 in (1.93 m)	—	Jr
G	21	Jonathan Haynes	6 ft 3 in (1.91 m)	—	Sr
G	30	Kerry Kittles	6 ft 5 in (1.96 m)	—	Jr
C	42	Jason Lawson	6 ft 11 in (2.11 m)	—	So
F	33	Zeffy Penn	—	—	So
C	22	Art Quarterman	6 ft 8 in (2.03 m)	—	So
	3	J Singleton	—	—
G	20	Alvin Williams	6 ft 5 in (1.96 m)	—	So
F	13	Ron Wilson	6 ft 9 in (2.06 m)	—	Sr

Head coach

- Steve Lappas (CCNY)

Assistant coach(es)

Legend

- (C) Team captain
- (S) Suspended
- (I) Ineligible
- (W) Walk-on
- Injured
- Current redshirt

== Schedule and results ==
Date time, TV	Rank^{#}	Opponent^{#}	Result	Record	Site city, state
Regular season
Nov 24, 1994*		at Alaska-Anchorage; Great Alaska Shootout	W 75–58	1–0	Sullivan Arena; Anchorage, Alaska
Nov 25, 1994*		vs. Minnesota; Great Alaska Shootout	L 64–85	1–1	Sullivan Arena; Anchorage, Alaska
Nov 26, 1994*		vs. Louisville; Great Alaska Shootout	W 82–81	2–1	Sullivan Arena; Anchorage, Alaska
Nov 30, 1994*		Marist	W 80–59	3–1	The Pavilion; Philadelphia, Pennsylvania
Dec 5, 1994		Seton Hall	W 98–75	4–1 (1–0)	The Pavilion; Philadelphia, Pennsylvania
Dec 8, 1994*		at No. 1 North Carolina	L 66–75	4–2	Dean Smith Center; Chapel Hill, North Carolina
Dec 18, 1994*		vs. Saint Joseph's	L 57–60	4–3	Hagan Arena
Dec 22, 1994*		Richmond	W 101–70	5–3	The Pavilion; Philadelphia, Pennsylvania
Dec 28, 1994*		Rider	W 80–69	6–3	The Pavilion; Philadelphia, Pennsylvania
Dec 30, 1994*		at Delaware	W 90–54	7–3	Bob Carpenter Center; Newark, Delaware
Jan 3, 1995		No. 6 Connecticut	L 62–77	7–4 (1–1)	The Pavilion; Philadelphia, Pennsylvania
Jan 7, 1995		at Boston College	W 89–66	8–4 (2–1)	Silvio O. Conte Forum; Boston, Massachusetts
Jan 9, 1995		at No. 8 Syracuse	L 60–61	8–5 (2–2)	Carrier Dome; Syracuse, New York
Jan 14, 1995*		at No. 15 Florida	W 72–70	9–5	Stephen C. O'Connell Center; Gainesville, Florida
Jan 18, 1995		Pittsburgh	W 71–69	10–5 (3–2)	The Pavilion; Philadelphia, Pennsylvania
Mar 4, 1995		at Providence	L 70–71	22–7 (14–4)	Providence Civic Center; Providence, Rhode Island
Big East tournament
Mar 10, 1995*	(2) No. 13	vs. (10) Boston College; Quarterfinals	W 68–64	23–7	Madison Square Garden; New York, New York
Mar 11, 1995*	(2) No. 13	vs. (6) Providence; Semifinals	W 90–75	24–7	Madison Square Garden; New York, New York
Mar 12, 1995*	(2) No. 13	vs. (1) No. 6 Connecticut; Championship game	W 94–78	25–7	Madison Square Garden; New York, New York
NCAA Tournament
Mar 17, 1995*	(3 E) No. 9	vs. (14 E) Old Dominion; First round	L 81–89 ^{3OT}	25–8	Times Union Center; Uniondale, New York
*Non-conference game. ^{#}Rankings from AP Poll. (#) Tournament seedings in parentheses. All times are in Eastern Time.
