= 1994–95 Pittsburgh Panthers men's basketball team =

American college basketball season

1994–95 Pittsburgh Panthers men's basketball
- Conference: Big East Conference (1979–2013)
- Record: 10–18 (5–13 Big East)
- Head coach: Ralph Willard (1st season)
- Assistant coaches: Bobby Jones (1st season); Tom Crean (1st season); Sean Cleary (1st season)
- Home arena: Fitzgerald Field House (Capacity: 4,122)

1994–95 Big East men's basketball standings
	Conf.				Overall
Team	W		L	PCT	W		L	PCT
No. 8 Connecticut	16	–	2	.889	28	–	5	.848
No. 9 Villanova †	14	–	4	.778	25	–	8	.758
No. 25 Syracuse	12	–	6	.667	20	–	10	.667
No. 22 Georgetown	11	–	7	.611	21	–	10	.677
Miami	9	–	9	.500	15	–	13	.536
Providence	7	–	11	.389	17	–	13	.567
Seton Hall	7	–	11	.389	16	–	14	.533
St. John's	7	–	11	.389	14	–	14	.500
Pittsburgh	5	–	13	.278	10	–	18	.357
Boston College	2	–	16	.111	9	–	19	.321
† 1995 Big East tournament winner As of April 3, 1995; Rankings from AP Poll

The 1994–95 Pittsburgh Panthers men's basketball team represented the University of Pittsburgh in the 1994–95 NCAA Division I men's basketball season. Led by first year head coach Ralph Willard, the Panthers finished with a record of 10–18.
