= Don Reid (basketball) =

American basketball player (born 1973)

Personal information
- Born: December 30, 1973 (age 52) Washington, D.C., U.S.
- Listed height: 6 ft 8 in (2.03 m)
- Listed weight: 250 lb (113 kg)

Career information
- High school: Largo (Largo, Maryland)
- College: Georgetown (1991–1995)
- NBA draft: 1995: 2nd round, 58th overall pick
- Drafted by: Detroit Pistons
- Playing career: 1995–2003
- Position: Power forward
- Number: 52, 50

Career history
- 1995–2000: Detroit Pistons
- 2000: Washington Wizards
- 2000–2002: Orlando Magic
- 2002–2003: Detroit Pistons

Career NBA statistics
- Points: 1,454 (3.6 ppg)
- Rebounds: 1,169 (2.9 rpg)
- Blocks: 282 (0.7 bpg)
- Stats at NBA.com
- Stats at Basketball Reference

Don Reid (born December 30, 1973) is an American former professional basketball player who was selected by the Detroit Pistons in the second round (58th pick overall) of the 1995 NBA draft. In his career, Reid played for the Pistons, Washington Wizards and Orlando Magic in 8 NBA seasons. In his 1995-96 rookie season as a member of the Pistons, he averaged 3.8 points in 69 games played. He played collegiately at Georgetown University.
