= Steve Lappas =

American former college basketball coach (born 1954)

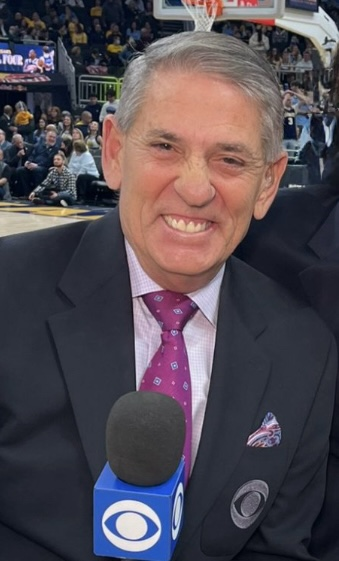
- Lappas announces a game for CBS Sports

Biographical details
- Born: March 18, 1954 (age 72); New York City, New York, U.S.

Playing career
- 1972–1977: CCNY

Coaching career (HC unless noted)
- 1977–1978: York College (CUNY) (assistant)
- 1978–1979: Fort Lee HS (NJ) (assistant)
- 1979–1984: Harry S. Truman HS (NY)
- 1984–1988: Villanova (assistant)
- 1988–1992: Manhattan
- 1992–2001: Villanova
- 2001–2005: UMass

Head coaching record
- Overall: 280–237 (.542) (college)
- Tournaments: 2–4 (NCAA Division I); 8–3 (NIT)

Accomplishments and honors

Championships
- NIT (1994); MAAC regular season (1992); Big East tournament (1995); Big East regular season (1997)

Awards
- MAAC Coach of the Year (1992)

Stephan Thomas Lappas (born March 18, 1954) is an American former college basketball coach. He coached at Manhattan (1988–1992), Villanova (1992–2001) and UMass (2001–2005), compiling a 280–237 (.542) record over a 17-year coaching career. He is currently a basketball color commentator and studio analyst for CBS Sports.

== Biography ==
=== Education ===
Lappas graduated from Bronx High School of Science in 1972, where he was sixth man on its 1971 city championship team and a starter as a prep senior. He went on to the City College of New York, where he was a three-year letterwinner in basketball and served as the team's captain in his junior season. He graduated in 1977 with a bachelor's degree in primary education.

=== Coaching career ===
In 1977, Lappas started coaching at York College, City University of New York as a volunteer, and moved to Fort Lee High School the next year, becoming an assistant. After one season, he assumed his first head coaching job with Harry S. Truman High School (in The Bronx), staying there through 1984. Lappas fashioned a 91–32 record, and was named New York Daily News Coach of the Year twice (1981 and 1984). Harry S. Truman High School won a New York State Class A championship under Lappas in the 1983–84 season, during which it was 27–3. In 1984 Lappas joined Rollie Massimino's staff at Villanova University.

==== Head coach ====
In 1988 Lappas became head coach at Manhattan College, where he turned around the program from a 7–21 season in 1988–89 to a 25–9 season and a berth to the 3rd round of the NIT in 1992. In 1992, he succeeded Rollie Massimino as head coach at Villanova, where he guided the team to seven postseason tournament appearances (four NCAA, three NIT), posting an 8–6 record and winning the 1994 National Invitation Tournament. In 2001, he resigned as head coach after Villanova declined to sign him for a long-term contract due to multiple years of poor recruiting, and a subsequent lack of success in the postseason. He became head coach of the University of Massachusetts on March 26, 2001. In four seasons at UMass, the Minutemen struggled under Lappas, and finished with a record of 50–65. His contract was not renewed and he was let go on March 14, 2005.

== Head coaching record ==
=== College ===
Record table
Season	Team	Overall	Conference	Standing	Postseason
Manhattan Jaspers (Metro Atlantic Athletic Conference) (1988–1992)
1988–89	Manhattan	7–21	3–11	7th	
1989–90	Manhattan	11–17	7–9	T–3rd	
1990–91	Manhattan	13–15	8–8	5th	
1991–92	Manhattan	25–9	13–3	1st	NIT third round
Manhattan:		56–62	31–31		
Villanova Wildcats (Big East Conference) (1992–2001)
1992–93	Villanova	8–19	3–15	10th	
1993–94	Villanova	20–12	10–8	T–4th	NIT champion
1994–95	Villanova	25–8	14–4	2nd	NCAA Division I first round
1995–96	Villanova	26–7	14–4	2nd (BE 6)	NCAA Division I second round
1996–97	Villanova	24–10	12–6	T–1st (BE 6)	NCAA Division I second round
1997–98	Villanova	12–17	8–10	4th (BE 6)	
1998–99	Villanova	21–11	10–8	T–4th	NCAA Division I first round
1999–00	Villanova	20–13	8–8	T–6th	NIT second round
2000–01	Villanova	18–13	8–8	T–3rd	NIT first round
Villanova:		174–110	87–71		
UMass Minutemen (Atlantic 10 Conference) (2001–2005)
2001–02	UMass	13–16	6–10	4th (East)	
2002–03*	UMass	11–18	6–10	4th (East)	
2003–04	UMass	10–19	4–12	4th (East)	
2004–05	UMass	16–12	9–7	3rd (East)	
UMass:		50–65	25–39		
Total:		280–237			
National champion Postseason invitational champion Conference regular season champion Conference regular season and conference tournament champion Division regular season champion Division regular season and conference tournament champion Conference tournament champion

* A-10 record includes a forfeit victory vs. St. Bonaventure, but season's overall win total does not include it.

== The Lappie Awards ==
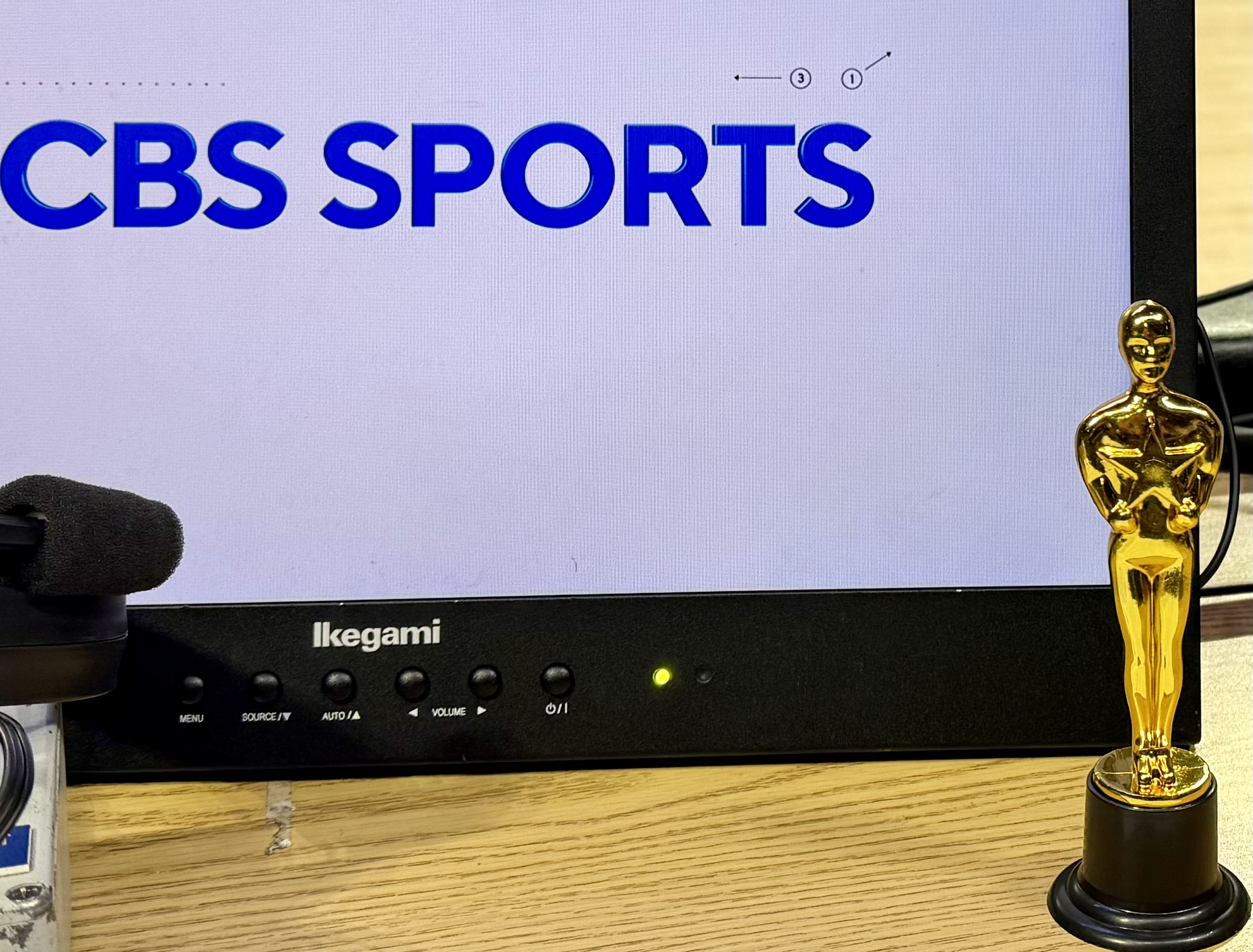
Lappie Trophy

The Lappie Awards (often referred to simply as the Lappies) are annual college basketball honors presented by CBS Sports and analyst Steve Lappas. The awards recognize standout achievements in NCAA Division I men's basketball, including Coach of the Year, Team of the Year, and Player of the Year. The selections are traditionally announced during a featured late season CBS broadcast. Over time, the awards have become a recurring element of CBS's pre tournament college basketball coverage.

== Award categories ==
- Coach of the Year
- Team of the Year
- Player of the Year

== Winners ==
=== 2017 ===
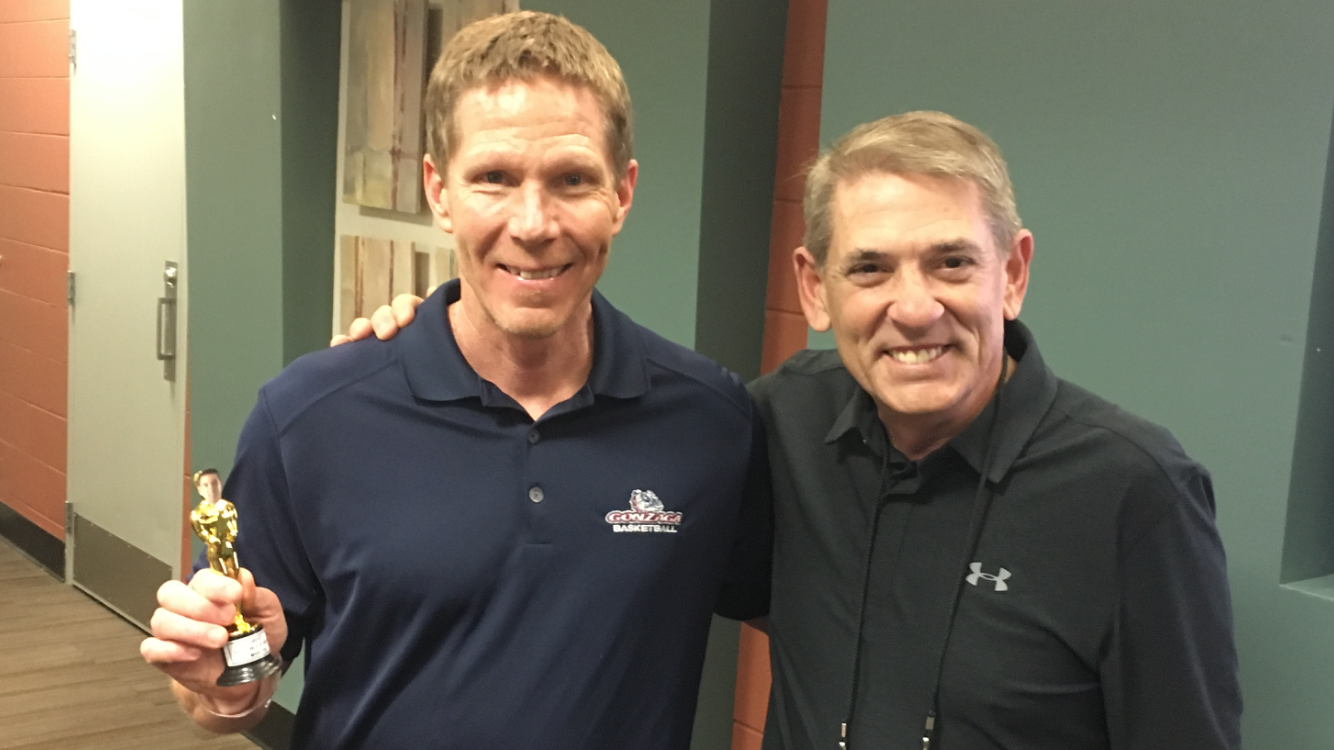
Mark Few 2017 Coach of the Year

Awarded During: Syracuse at Louisville — February 26, 2017

- Coach of the Year: Mark Few (Gonzaga)
- Team of the Year: Villanova
- Player of the Year: Josh Hart (Villanova)

=== 2018 ===
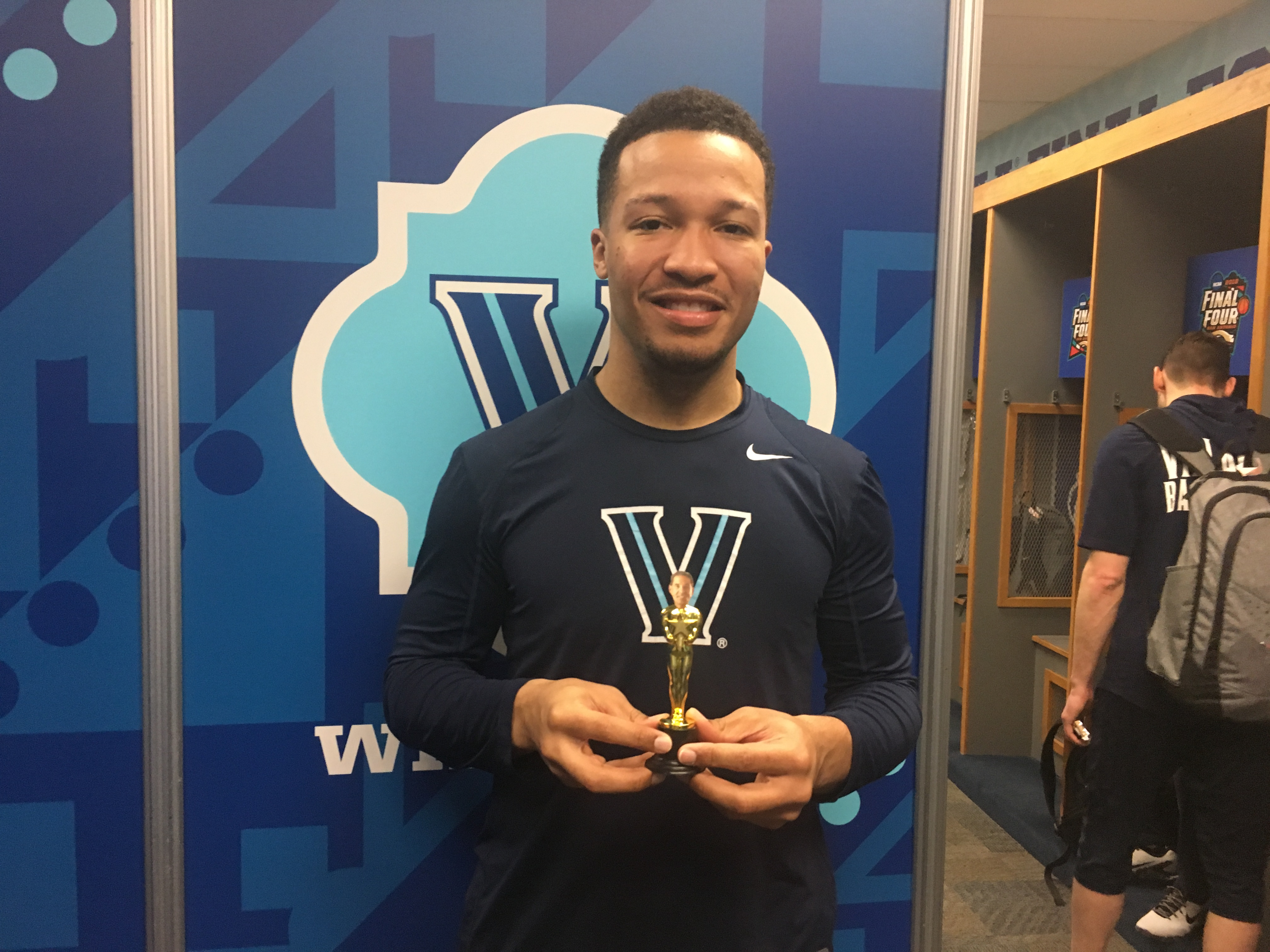
Jalen Brunson 2018 Player of the Year

Awarded During: Cincinnati at Wichita State — March 4, 2018

- Coach of the Year: Tony Bennett (Virginia)
- Team of the Year: Virginia
- Player of the Year: Jalen Brunson (Villanova)

=== 2019 ===
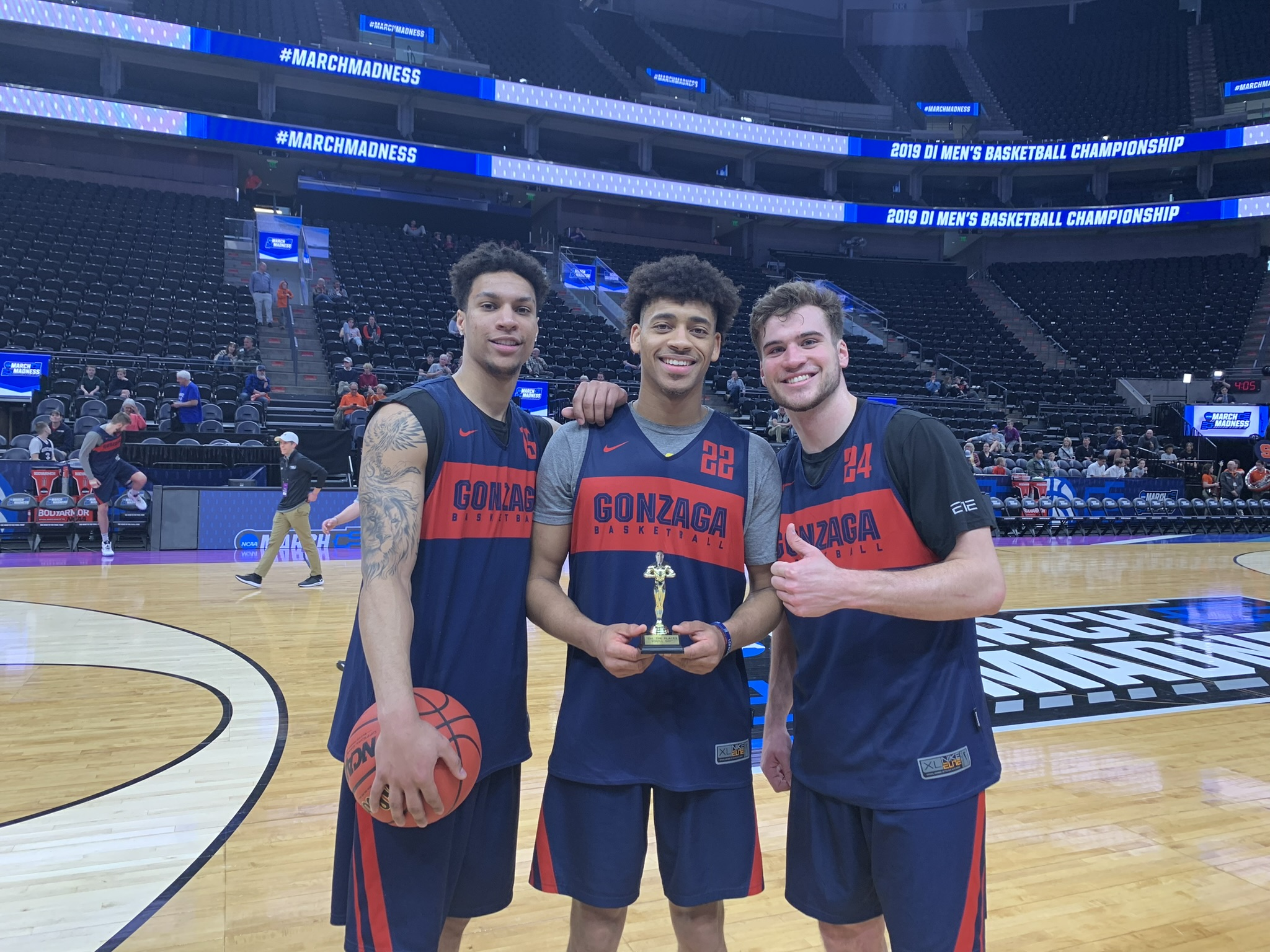
Gonzaga 2019 Team of the Year

Awarded During: Villanova at Xavier — March 15, 2019

- Coach of the Year: Rick Barnes (Tennessee)
- Team of the Year: Gonzaga
- Player of the Year: Zion Williamson (Duke)

=== 2020 ===
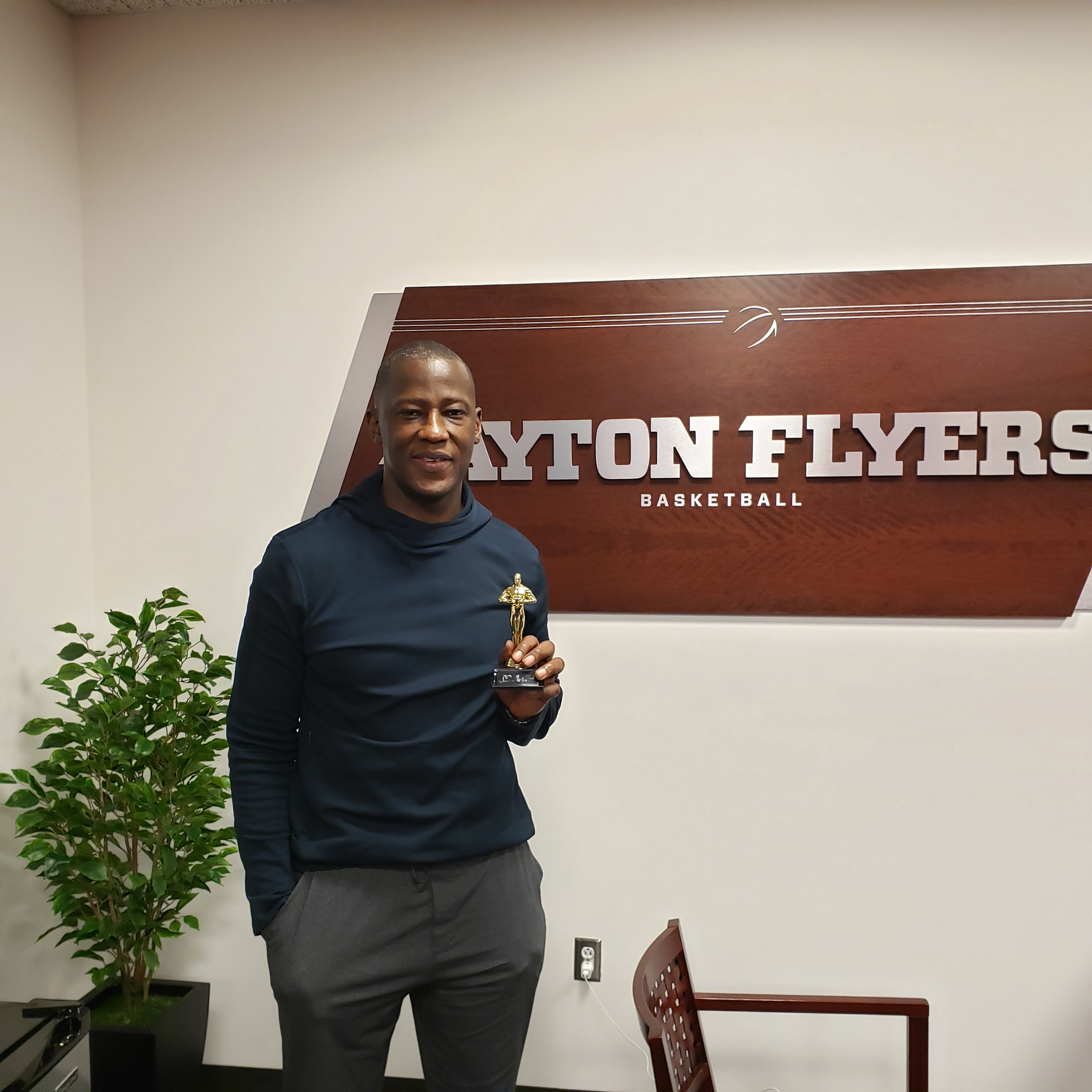
Anthony Grant 2020 Coach of the Year

Awarded During: Xavier at Georgetown — March 1, 2020

2020 Awards

- Coach of the Year: Anthony Grant (Dayton)
- Team of the Year: San Diego State
- Player of the Year: Obi Toppin (Dayton)

=== 2021 ===
Awarded During: Memphis at Houston — March 7, 2021

2021 Awards

- Coach of the Year: Juwan Howard (Michigan)
- Team of the Year: Gonzaga
- Player of the Year: Luka Garza (Iowa)

=== 2022 ===
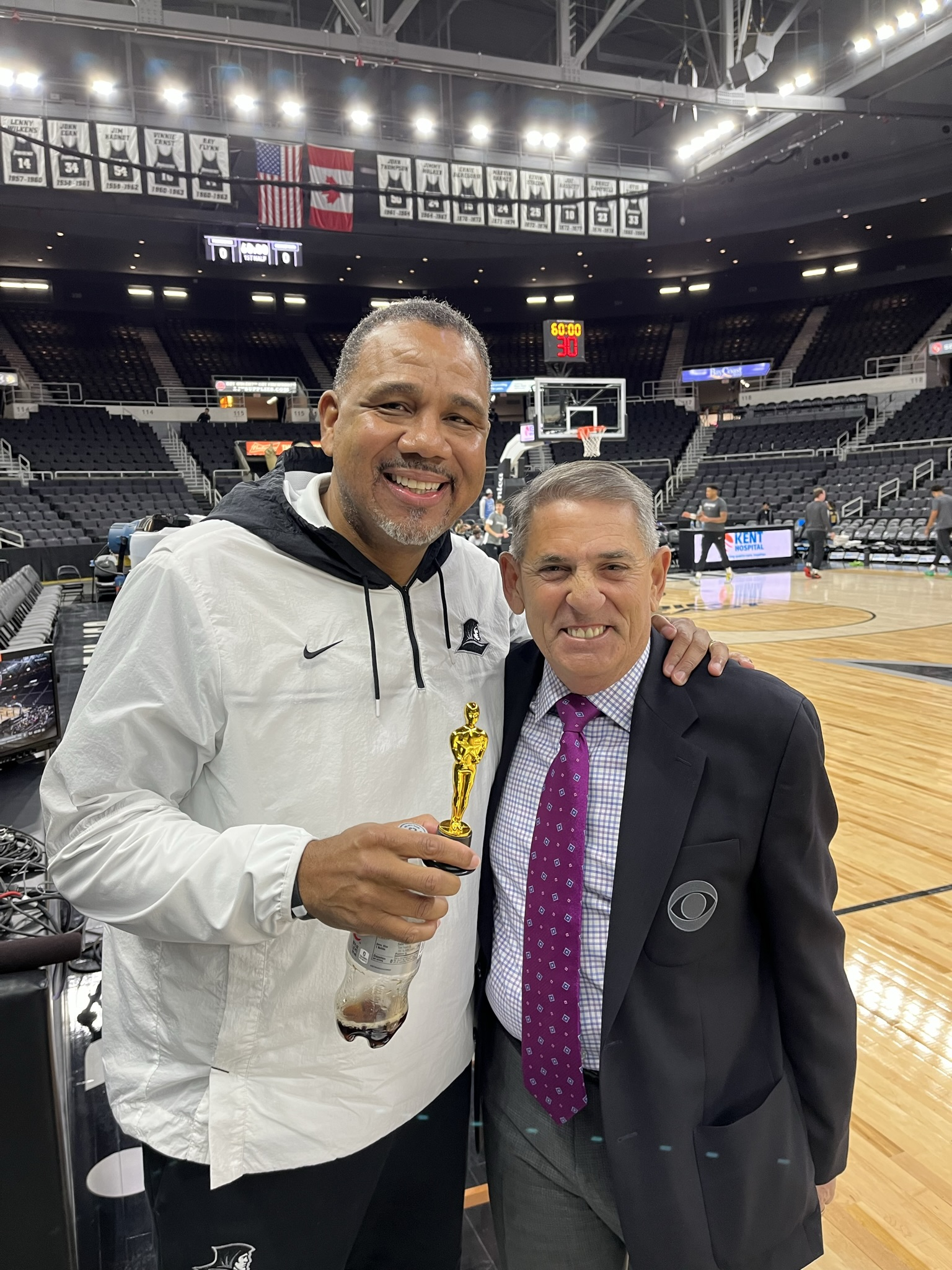
Ed Cooley 2022 Coach of the Year

Awarded During: Alabama at LSU — March 5, 2022

- Coach of the Year: Ed Cooley (Providence)
- Team of the Year: Arizona
- Player of the Year: Johnny Davis (Wisconsin)

=== 2023 ===
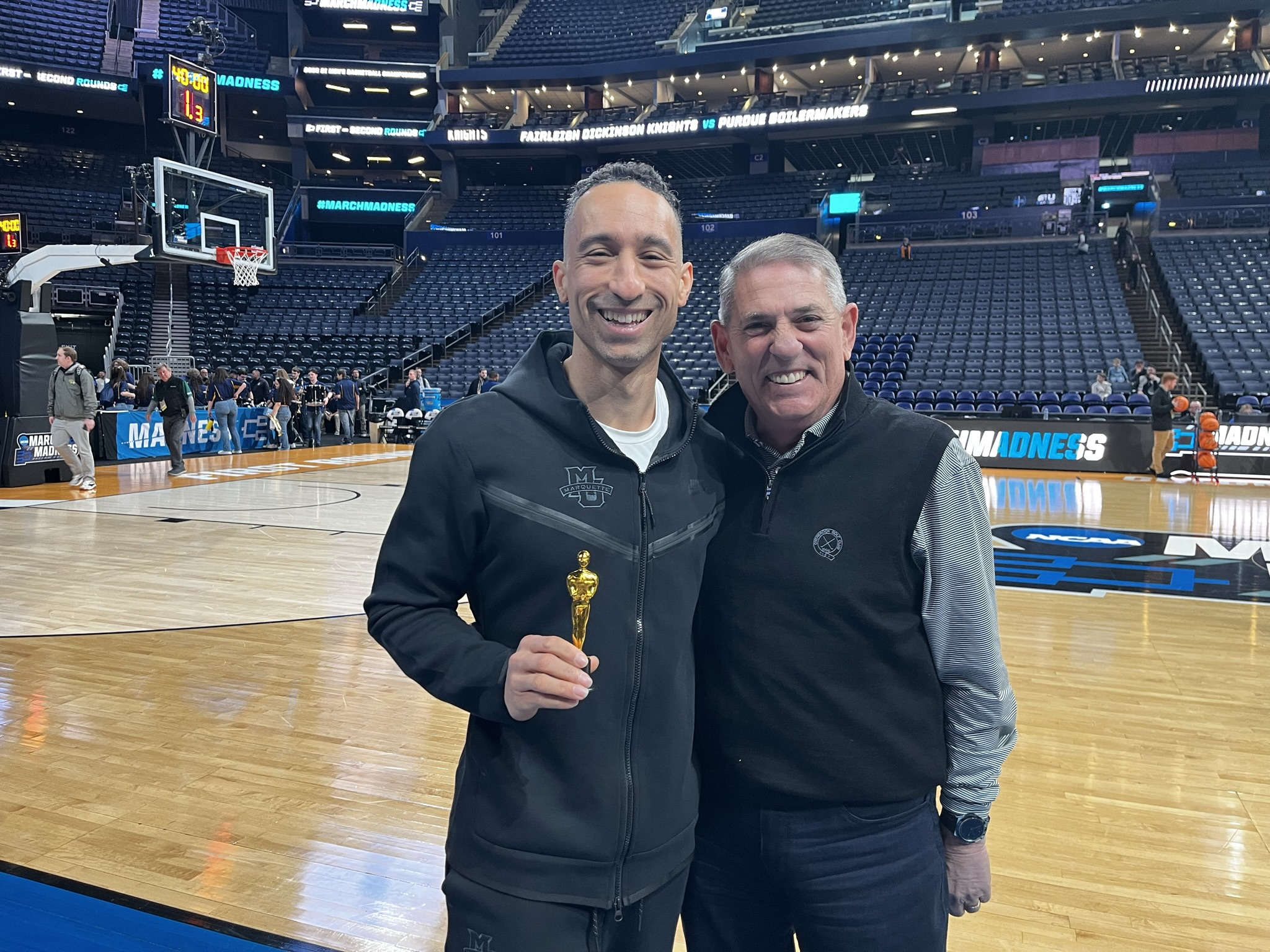
Shaka Smart 2023 Coach of the Year

Awarded During: Kentucky at Arkansas — March 4, 2023

- Coach of the Year: Shaka Smart (Marquette)
- Team of the Year: Houston
- Player of the Year: Zach Edey (Purdue)

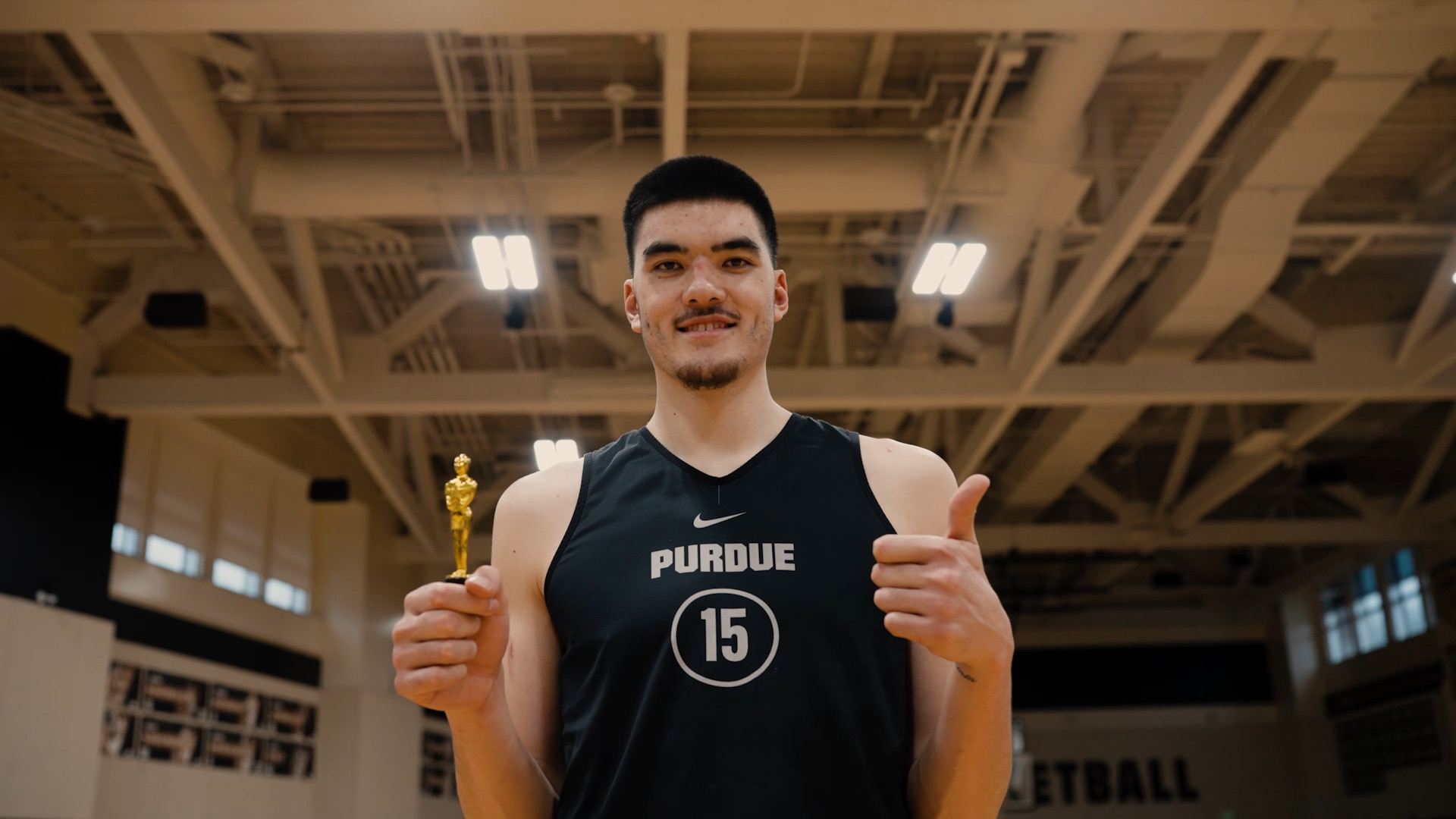
Zach Edey 2023 Player of the Year

=== 2024 ===
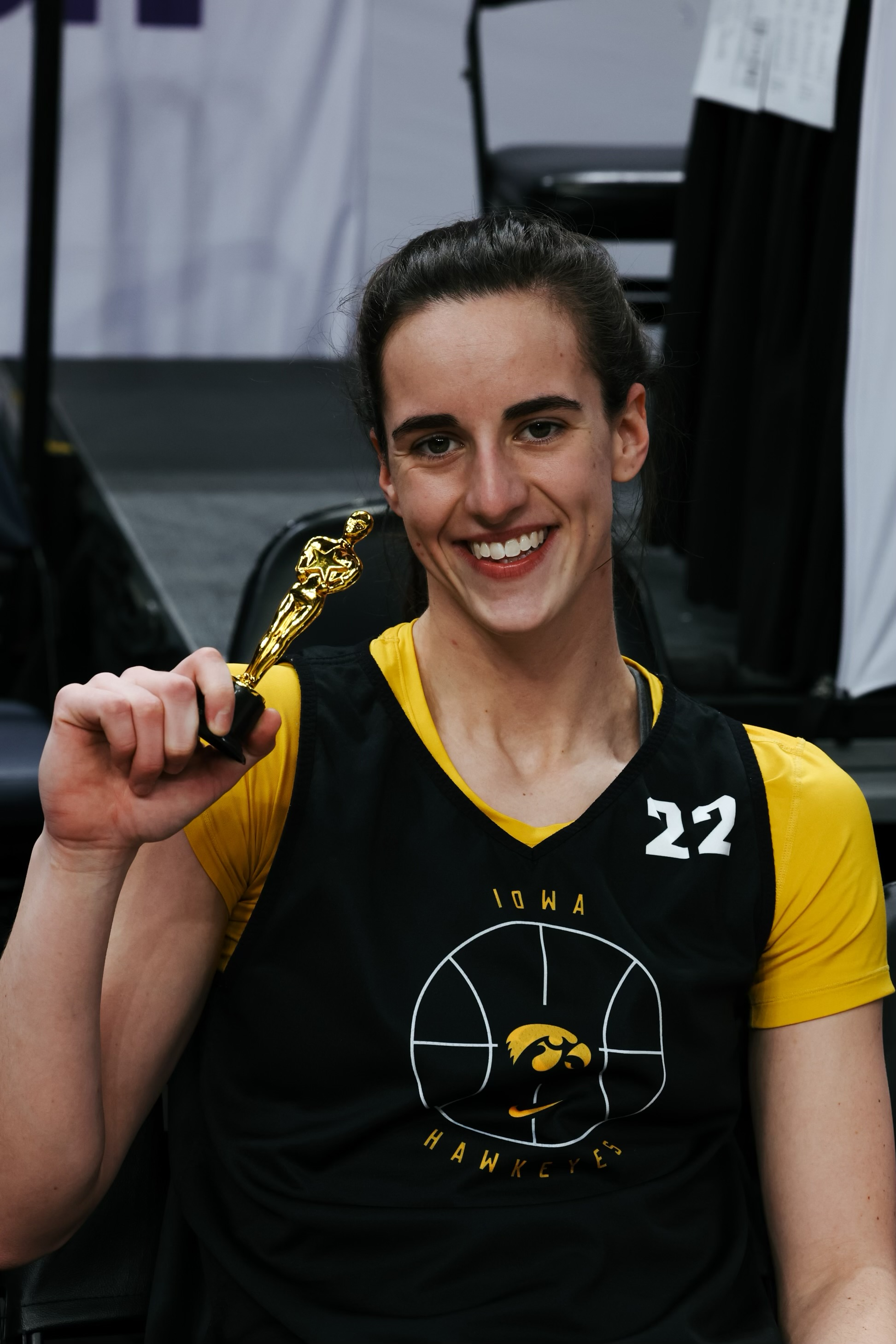
Caitlin Clark 2024 Player of the Year

Awarded During: Memphis at Florida Atlantic — March 9, 2024

2024 Awards

- Coach of the Year: Dan Hurley (UConn)
- Team of the Year: UConn
- Player of the Year: Caitlin Clark (Iowa)

=== 2025 ===
Awarded During: Iowa State at Kansas State — March 8, 2025

2025 Awards

- Coach of the Year: Pat Kelsey (Louisville)
- Team of the Year: Auburn
- Player of the Year: Cooper Flagg (Duke)

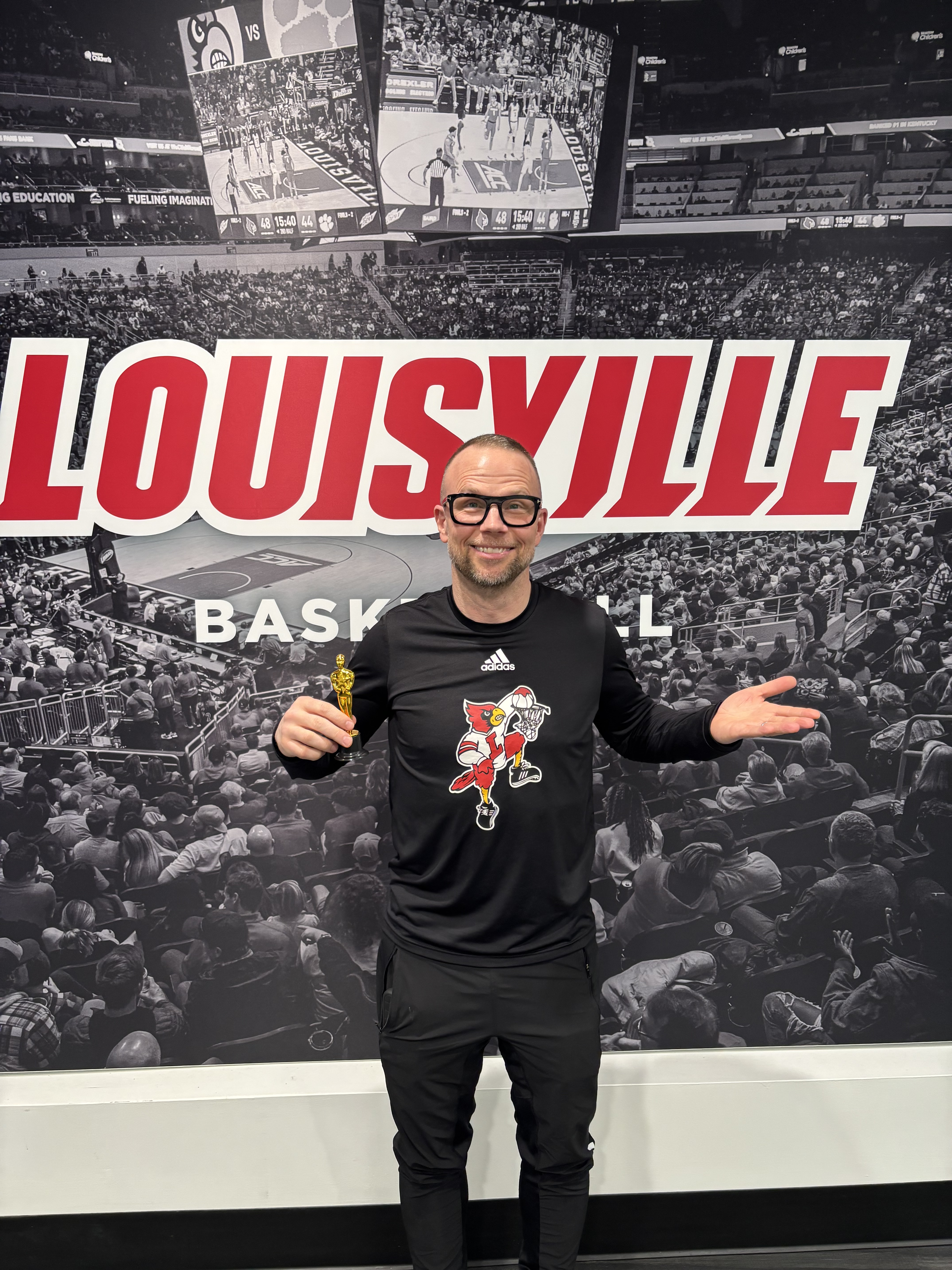
Pat Kelsey 2025 Coach of the Year

=== 2026 ===
Awarded During: Houston at Oklahoma State — March 7, 2026

2026 Awards

- Coach of the Year: Tommy Lloyd (Arizona)
- Team of the Year: Miami (OH)
- Player of the Year: Cameron Boozer (Duke)

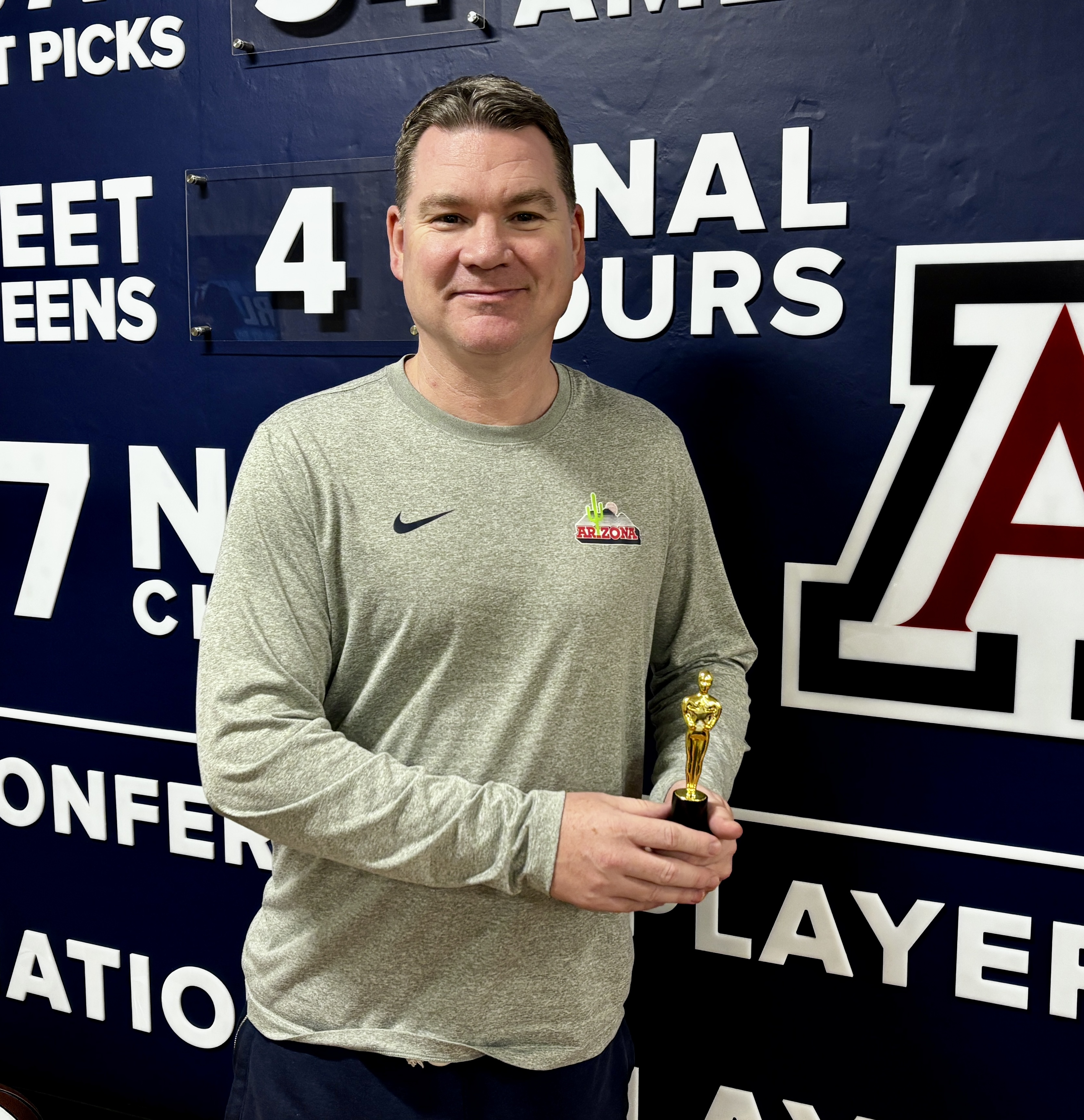
Tommy Lloyd 2026 Coach of the Year

== See also ==
- CBS Sports
- Steve Lappas
- CBS Sports official site
