= Kerry Kittles =

American basketball player (born 1974)

Personal information
- Born: June 12, 1974 (age 52) Dayton, Ohio, U.S.
- Listed height: 6 ft 5 in (1.96 m)
- Listed weight: 185 lb (84 kg)

Career information
- High school: St. Augustine (New Orleans, Louisiana)
- College: Villanova (1992–1996)
- NBA draft: 1996: 1st round, 8th overall pick
- Drafted by: New Jersey Nets
- Playing career: 1996–2005
- Position: Shooting guard
- Number: 30
- Coaching career: 2016–2018

Career history

Playing
- 1996–2004: New Jersey Nets
- 2004–2005: Los Angeles Clippers

Coaching
- 2016–2018: Princeton (assistant)

Career highlights
- As player: NBA All-Rookie Second Team (1997); Consensus first-team All-American (1996); Consensus second-team All-American (1995); Big East Player of the Year (1995); 3× First-team All-Big East (1994–1996); 2× Robert V. Geasey Trophy winner (1995, 1996); No. 30 retired by Villanova Wildcats; As assistant coach: Ivy League tournament winner (2017)

Career NBA statistics
- Points: 7,165 (14.1 ppg)
- Rebounds: 1,983 (3.9 rpg)
- Assists: 1,295 (2.6 apg)
- Stats at NBA.com
- Stats at Basketball Reference
Medals
Men's basketball
Representing United States
Summer Universiade
Gold medal – first place	1995 Fukuoka	Team competition

Kerry Kittles (born June 12, 1974) is an American basketball coach and former professional basketball player. A 6 ft 5 in (1.96 m) shooting guard, Kittles played for the New Jersey Nets and the Los Angeles Clippers in an NBA career that spanned from 1996 to 2005.

Kittles was raised in New Orleans and attended St. Augustine High School. He then attended Villanova University, where he led the Villanova Wildcats to the 1994 NIT Championship. As a junior, Kittles made the All-Big East team and helped Villanova win the 1995 Big East tournament championship. Villanova reached the NCAA tournament in 1996, Kittles's senior season. Kittles was named the Big East Conference Men's Basketball Player of the Year in 1995 and was a consensus first-team All-American in 1996. He was inducted into the program's hall of fame and had his #30 retired.

Kittles was selected by the New Jersey Nets with the eighth pick in the 1996 NBA draft. In his first season, he was named to the All-Rookie Second Team. He sat out his entire fifth season, in 2000–01, due to rehabilitation from off-season surgery on his right knee. Kittles played in the 2002 and 2003 NBA Finals as a member of the Nets. Following seven seasons with the Nets, Kittles was traded to the Los Angeles Clippers in a salary purge. After one injury-riddled year with the Clippers, Kittles retired from the NBA.

Kittles was an assistant coach at Princeton from 2016 to 2018.

== High school career ==
Kittles attended St. Augustine High School and was considered to be one of the best basketball talents to ever come out of New Orleans. He led St. Augustine to a 66–5 record in his last two seasons while also earning first-team all-metro and all-state honors under head coach Bernard Griffith. As a junior, Kittles led the Purple Knights to the 1991 state finals. As a senior he averaged 22.5 points per game for St. Augustine as they finished with a 32–3 record. The team defeated John Ehret High School in the 1992 Class 5A state championship game. He was named Louisiana Mr. Basketball in 1992.

== College career ==
After finishing high school, Kittles attended Villanova University and played for its Wildcats basketball team. Kittles' commitment to Villanova was a surprise to Louisiana basketball fans by going out of state.

Kittles considered transferring to another university when head coach Rollie Massimino left for UNLV before his freshman year. New head coach Steve Lappas flew to New Orleans the day after he was hired to convince Kittles to stay at Villanova.

Kittles possessed an accurate, quick-trigger jump shot and used his long, athletic 6 ft 5 in (1.96 m) frame to drive and finish strong at the rim. He was a heady player with a tenacious defensive will. These characteristics allowed Kittles to become one of the most decorated players ever in the school's history. Kittles ended his college career as Villanova's all-time leader for most points (2,243) and steals (277). As a sophomore he led the Wildcats to the 1994 NIT Championship. Kittles made All-Big East as a junior averaging 21.4 points per game and led Villanova to the 1995 Big East tournament championship. He won the Big East tournament MVP award and would garner Consensus All-American honors. In his senior season, Kittles averaged 20 points per game, was named All-Big 5 Player of the Year for the second time, and again received All-Big East and All-American honors with Villanova earning a national no. 2 rank at one point but getting upset in the NCAA Tournament by Louisville in the second round. Kittles was later inducted into the team's Hall of Fame and had his #30 retired.

== Professional career ==
In the 1996 NBA draft, Kittles was selected eighth overall by the New Jersey Nets. Kittles made the NBA All-Rookie Second Team for the 1996–97 season, after averaging 16.7 points, 3.9 rebounds, 3 assists, and 1.9 steals a game. On April 13, 1997, Kittles scored a career-best 40 points in a 123–132 loss to the Milwaukee Bucks. That same season, he set the Nets' franchise record and NBA rookie record for three-point field goals made with 158.

Kittles enjoyed a productive seven-year stint starting at shooting guard for the Nets. However, after he averaged 16.4 points per game as a rookie, followed by 17.2 points per game as a second-year player, knee injuries began to slow his game. Kittles would have four operations in five years. He missed the 2000–01 season due to a knee injury. He posted three seasons shooting over 40 percent from the three-point range and helped Jason Kidd to take the Nets to back-to-back NBA Finals appearances in 2002 and 2003.

In July 2004, the Nets traded Kittles to the Los Angeles Clippers in a cost-cutting move. As of 2020, Kittles held third place on the Nets' all-time list in three-point field goals (687) and third place in steals (803).

After an injury-riddled season with the Clippers, Kittles retired from the NBA in 2005.

== Coaching career ==
Kittles was an assistant basketball coach at Princeton University from 2016 to 2018.

== Personal life ==
Kittles, together with his wife, four daughters and one son, has been a resident of Harding Township, New Jersey.

Kittles is Catholic and religion is an important part of his life. He chose to attend Villanova because it is a Catholic institution, stating at the time:

"It was a smaller institution, it was a Catholic school, its basketball games were on television and I had the opportunity to play. But the biggest factor was its graduation rate."

Kittles became a eucharistic minister in 1996. As of 2020, he remained a eucharistic minister.

Kittles earned his Master of Business Administration degree from Villanova in 2009. He has served as a member of the university's board of trustees. Kittles is a member of Kappa Alpha Psi fraternity.

== Career statistics ==
Legend
GP	Games played	GS	Games started	MPG	Minutes per game
FG%	Field goal percentage	3P%	3-point field goal percentage	FT%	Free throw percentage
RPG	Rebounds per game	APG	Assists per game	SPG	Steals per game
BPG	Blocks per game	PPG	Points per game	**Bold**	Career high

=== NBA ===
==== Regular season ====
Year	Team	GP	GS	MPG	FG%	3P%	FT%	RPG	APG	SPG	BPG	PPG
1996–97	New Jersey	**82**	57	**36.7**	.426	.377	.771	3.9	**3.0**	**1.9**	.4	16.4
1997–98	New Jersey	77	76	36.5	.440	**.418**	**.808**	**4.7**	2.3	1.7	.5	**17.2**
1998–99	New Jersey	46	40	34.1	.370	.316	.772	4.2	2.5	1.7	**.6**	12.9
1999–00	New Jersey	62	61	30.6	.437	.400	.795	3.6	2.3	1.3	.3	13.0
2001–02	New Jersey	**82**	**82**	31.7	.466	.405	.744	3.4	2.6	1.6	.4	13.4
2002–03	New Jersey	65	57	30.0	**.467**	.356	.785	3.9	2.6	1.6	.5	13.0
2003–04	New Jersey	**82**	**82**	34.7	.453	.351	.787	4.0	2.5	1.5	.5	13.1
2004–05	L.A. Clippers	11	0	22.1	.384	.333	.600	2.9	1.8	.7	.3	6.3
Career		507	455	33.4	.439	.378	.780	3.9	2.6	1.6	.4	14.1

==== Playoffs ====
Year	Team	GP	GS	MPG	FG%	3P%	FT%	RPG	APG	SPG	BPG	PPG
1998	New Jersey	3	3	**42.0**	.425	.385	**.909**	**5.0**	**2.7**	1.3	.7	**16.3**
2002	New Jersey	**20**	**20**	29.0	.435	.265	.778	3.2	2.3	1.6	.5	12.1
2003	New Jersey	**20**	**20**	30.7	.395	**.413**	.762	3.5	2.0	1.5	.3	10.8
2004	New Jersey	11	11	37.7	**.448**	.327	.618	4.3	2.1	**2.0**	**.9**	14.4
Career		54	54	32.1	.424	.337	.742	3.6	2.1	1.6	.5	12.3

=== College ===
Year	Team	GP	GS	MPG	FG%	3P%	FT%	RPG	APG	SPG	BPG	PPG
1992–93	Villanova	27	—	32.4	.482	**.432**	.673	3.5	2.9	1.7	**.4**	10.9
1993–94	Villanova	32	—	**39.3**	.452	.349	.705	6.5	3.4	**2.7**	**.4**	19.7
1994–95	Villanova	**33**	**33**	36.9	**.524**	.411	**.767**	6.1	**3.5**	2.2	**.4**	**21.4**
1995–96	Villanova	30	29	35.3	.455	.404	.710	**7.1**	**3.5**	2.4	**.4**	20.4
Career		122	62	36.1	.478	.394	.719	5.9	3.3	2.3	.4	18.4
