= Jason Lawson =

American basketball player and coach (born 1974)

Personal information
- Born: September 2, 1974 (age 52) Philadelphia, Pennsylvania, U.S.
- Listed height: 6 ft 11 in (2.11 m)
- Listed weight: 240 lb (109 kg)

Career information
- High school: Olney (Philadelphia, Pennsylvania)
- College: Villanova (1993–1997)
- NBA draft: 1997: 2nd round, 41st overall pick
- Drafted by: Denver Nuggets
- Playing career: 1997–2008
- Position: Power forward / center
- Number: 8

Career history
- 1997–1998: Orlando Magic
- 1998–2000: Grand Rapids Hoops
- 2000: Caja San Fernando
- 2000–2001: Pau-Orthez
- 2001–2002: Grand Rapids Hoops
- 2002: Panionios
- 2002–2003: Entente Orléanaise
- 2003: Pennsylvania ValleyDawgs
- 2004: Columbus Riverdragons
- 2005–2008: Halcones Rojos Veracruz
- 2008: Al-Wehdat

Career highlights
- CBA All-Defensive Team (2000); Big East Defensive Player of the Year (1997); Big East All-Freshman team (1994); Second-team Parade All-American (1993); Fourth-team Parade All-American (1992)
- Stats at NBA.com
- Stats at Basketball Reference
Medals
Men's basketball
Representing United States
Summer Universiade
Gold medal – first place	1995 Fukuoka

Jason Love Lawson (born September 2, 1974) is an American former professional basketball player and coach.

== Playing career ==
The 6'11", 240 pound forward-center went to college at Villanova University. He played with the Orlando Magic in the 1997–98 NBA season after being selected by the Denver Nuggets in the 1997 NBA draft. In his only NBA season he played in 17 games, averaging 4.7 minutes per game, he had a field goal percentage of 60.0%. He had an 80.0% free throw accuracy. He had an average of 1.6 rebounds per game. He also averaged 0.3 assists per game, 0.2 steals per game, 0.2 blocks per game and 1.5 points per game.

Lawson played for the Grand Rapids Hoops of the Continental Basketball Association (CBA) and was selected to the CBA All-Defensive Team in 2000.

== Coaching career ==
Lawson continues to coach in the Philadelphia area with the private coaching service, CoachUp.
