= List of Wake Forest University people =

This list of Wake Forest University people includes notable alumni, faculty and presidents of Wake Forest University, a private research university located in Winston-Salem, North Carolina, United States.

== Heads of Wake Forest Manual Labor Institute, Wake Forest College, and Wake Forest University ==
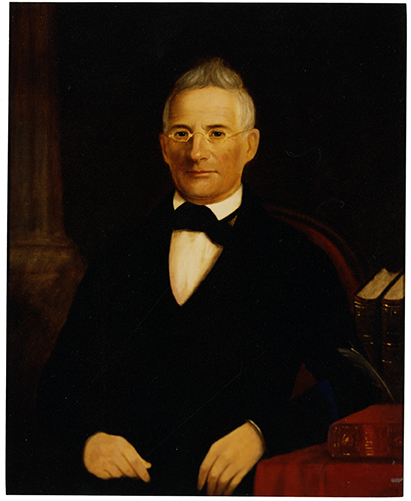
Samuel Wait

President	Tenure
Samuel Wait	1834–1845
William Hooper	1845–1848
John B. White	1848–1853
Washington Manly Wingate	acting 1854–1856, president 1856–1862, 1866–1879
Thomas H. Pritchard	1879–1882
Charles Taylor	1884–1905
William L. Poteat	1905–1927
Francis Pendleton Gaines	1927–1930
Thurman D. Kitchin	1930–1950
Harold W. Tribble	1950–1967
James R. Scales	1967–1983
Thomas K. Hearn	1983–2005
Nathan O. Hatch	2005–2021
Susan Wente	2021–2026

== Alumni ==
=== Academia ===
==== Founders and leaders of academic institutions ====
- Bonita Brown (B.A. 1995, J.D. 1997), fourteenth chancellor of Winston Salem State University
- James Archibald Campbell (B.A. 1911), first president of Campbell College
- Leslie H. Campbell (magna cum laude, A.B.1911, A.M. 1916), second president of Campbell College
- John Wesley Chandler (B.A. 1945), 12th president of Williams College, 15th president of Hamilton College and president of the AACU in 1985
- Spright Dowell (B.A.1896), former president of Auburn University and Mercer University
- Michael Maxey (B.A., M.A.), 11th president of Roanoke College
- George M. Modlin (B.A. 1924), former president of the University of Richmond
- William Louis Poteat (B.A. 1877), educator; seventh president of Wake Forest University (1905–1927)
- Norman Adrian Wiggins (1952), third president of Campbell University
- Washington Manly Wingate (B.A. 1849), 4th president of Wake Forest University

=== Arts and letters ===
==== Literature and poetry ====
- Joseph Quincy Adams Jr. (B.A. 1900, M.A. 1901)
- Stephen Amidon (B.A.), author
- A.R. Ammons (B.A. 1949), poet and scholar
- Mark D. Brenner (B.A.), author, journalist
- T. Davis Bunn (B.A. 1974), author
- Justin Catanoso (M.A. 1993), author
- Gary Chapman (M.A.), author and radio talk show host
- Dhonielle Clayton (B.A. 2005), author and CEO of We Need Diverse Books
- Frances O'Roark Dowell (B.A. 1979), author
- L.M. Elliott (B.A.), author, Under a War-Torn Sky
- Margaret Feinberg (B.A.), author and public speaker
- Daveed Gartenstein-Ross (B.A.), author, founder of Valens Global
- Emily Giffin (B.A.), author of Something Borrowed
- Elizabeth Marquardt (B.A.), author
- Clint McCown (B.A., M.A.), poet, author
- Toni Newman (B.A. 1985), author

==== Journalism and media ====
- Jason Benetti (J.D. 2011), play-by-play announcer for the Detroit Tigers
- Linda Carter Brinson (B.A. 1969), writer, editor, and journalist
- Bethany Brookshire (PhD 2010), science journalist
- W. J. Cash (A.B. 1922), author and journalist
- Janice Marie Collins (B.A. 1986), journalist
- Becky Garrison (B.A.), religious satirist and columnist for The Wittenburg Door
- Laci Green (M.A. 2024), YouTuber
- James Hamblin (B.S. 2005), board-certified physician, staff writer at The Atlantic, lecturer in public health policy at Yale University
- Shane Harris (B.A. 1998), journalist and author, senior national security writer at The Washington Post
- Melissa Harris-Perry (B.A. 1994), political scientist and journalist
- Harold Hayes (B.A.), writer, former editor of Esquire magazine
- Maria Henson (B.A. 1982), journalist, editor, winner of the Pulitzer Prize for Editorial Writing award
- Al Hunt (B.A. 1965), journalist and columnist for Bloomberg News
- Martha Mason (B.A. 1960), writer
- Carlos Maza (B.A. 2010), journalist for Vox
- Dagen McDowell (B.A. 1991), anchor for Fox Business Channel and business correspondent for Fox News
- Hoke Norris, journalist
- Kasha Patel (B.A. 2012), science writer
- Scott Rasmussen (M.B.A.), political analyst
- LaChina Robinson (B.A. 2002), women's college basketball analyst for Fox Sports 1
- Eddie Timanus (B.A. 1990), USA Today sportswriter; Jeopardy! champion

==== Music ====
- Christopher Magiera (B.A.), international operatic baritone, professor of voice
- Clare Shore (B.A. 1976), music composer

==== Film and television ====
- Carol Barbee (B.A.), television producer, writer
- Stephanie Birkitt (B.A. 1997), assistant to David Letterman on Late Show with David Letterman
- Marc Blucas (B.A. 1994), actor
- David Burris (M.A.), filmmaker and television producer
- David Chase (attended two years; transferred to New York University), director and producer, winner of seven Primetime Emmy Awards
- Tyler Cameron (B.A. 2018), television personality, model
- Andi Dorfman (J.D. 2012), television personality, The Bachelorette
- Drew Droege (B.A. 1999), actor, comedian, writer and director
- James DuBose (B.A. 1990), film and television producer, entertainment industry executive; Rising Star Award recipient
- Ward Horton, actor
- Matt James (B.A. 2015), television personality, first black bachelor lead for The Bachelor
- Cheslie Kryst (J.D., M.B.A. 2017), television correspondent, winner of Miss USA 2019
- Joe Lawson (B.A.), co-creator of GEICO Cavemen commercials and ABC's Cavemen TV series
- Carter MacIntyre (B.A.), television actor (American Heiress, Undercovers)
- Lee Norris (B.A. 2004), film and television actor (Boy Meets World, The Torkelsons, One Tree Hill)
- Sarah Schneider (B.A. 2005), former writer for Saturday Night Live
- Arvind Swamy (M.A.), Indian Tamil film actor and businessman
- Dave Willis (B.A.), co-creator of the animated TV shows Aqua Teen Hunger Force and Squidbillies; writer and voice actor for animated TV show Space Ghost: Coast to Coast

==== Visual art ====
- Justin Brice Guariglia (B.A. 1997), artist and former documentary photographer for the National Geographic Society
- Mercedes Teixido (B.A.), visual artist

=== Politics, law, and government ===
==== U.S. governors ====
- John S. Battle (B.A.), former 56th governor of Virginia
- Thomas Walter Bickett (B.A.), 54th governor of North Carolina
- J. Melville Broughton (B.A.1910), governor of North Carolina (D) (1941–45) and U.S. senator
- Charlie Crist (attended two years; transferred to Florida State University), 44th governor of Florida
- Robert L. Ehrlich (J.D. 1982), governor of Maryland (R) and former congressman
- William W. Kitchin (1884), governor of North Carolina (D) (1909–13)
- Charles Aurelius Smith (B.A. 1882), 91st governor of South Carolina

==== U.S. senators and representatives ====
- Josiah W. Bailey (B.A. 1893), U.S. senator (D-NC) (1931–46)
- Ted Budd (M.B.A. 2007), U.S. senator (R-NC); former congressman (NC-13)
- Richard Burr (B.A. 1978), former U.S. senator (R-NC)
- Charlie Crist (attended two years; transferred to Florida State University), former U.S. representative for Florida's 13th congressional district
- Joseph J. Davis, former U.S. representative (NC)
- Charles B. Deane (L.L.B. 1923), former U.S. representative (NC), North Carolina's 8th congressional district
- Oliver H. Dockery, former U.S. representative (NC)
- Donna Edwards (B.A. 1980), Democratic representative of Maryland's 4th Congressional District
- David Funderburk (B.A., M.A. 1967), former congressman (R-NC) (1995–97); U.S. ambassador to Romania (1981–85)
- Kay Hagan (J.D. 1978), former U.S. senator of North Carolina (D-NC)
- George Holding (B.A., J.D.), former United States representative for North Carolina's 2nd congressional district
- John H. Kerr (B.A., J.D.), former member of the United States House of Representatives, represented North Carolina's 2nd congressional district
- Larry Kissell (B.A. 1973), U.S. congressman (D-NC)
- Claude Kitchin (B.A. 1888), former House minority leader and House majority leader of U.S. House of Representatives
- Brad Knott (J.D.), U.S. congressman (R-NC)
- Horace R. Kornegay (B.A. 1947, LL.B. 1949), former U.S. congressman, member of North Carolina's 6th congressional district
- Alton A. Lennon (B.A. 1929), former U.S. senator; congressman (D-NC)
- Robert Burren Morgan (J.D. 1950), former U.S. senator (D-NC) (1977–81)
- Monroe M. Redden, former member of U.S. House of Representatives (NC)
- Furnifold M. Simmons (LL.B. 1923), former U.S. senator (D-NC) (1901–31)
- Charles H. Taylor (B.A. 1963, J.D. 1966), former congressman (R-NC)
- Frank Thompson (B.A., L.L.B.), former U.S. representative (NJ)

==== Diplomats ====
- James P. Cain (B.A.), former U.S. ambassador to Denmark
- Robert S. Gilchrist (B.A.), United States ambassador to Lithuania
- Dennis Walter Hearne (B.A.), United States ambassador to Mozambique
- Jeanette W. Hyde (transferred to Delta State), former ambassador to Barbados, Dominica, St. Lucia, Antigua, Grenada, St. Vincent, and St. Christopher-Nevis-Anguilla
- Graham Martin (B.A. 1932), former U.S. ambassador to Italy, Thailand, and South Vietnam
- William V. Roebuck (B.A., M.A.), former U.S. ambassador to Bahrain

==== Federal officials ====
- Laura Daniel-Davis (B.A. 1990), former deputy secretary of the interior
- Janice B. Gardner (B.A.), former assistant secretary of the Treasury for Intelligence and Analysis under the George W. Bush Administration
- John Graham (B.A. 1978), former senior official in the George W. Bush Administration
- Jennifer M. Harris (B.A.), senior director for International Economics & Labor on the U.S. National Security Council
- Bo Hines (J.D. 2022), former federal official in the Second Trump Administration
- Robert L. Wilkie (B.A. 1985), former assistant secretary of defense and secretary of veterans affairs

==== Judges and attorneys ====
- Amy M. Baggio (B.A., summa cum laude 1995), judge of the Multnomah County Circuit Court
- Kenneth D. Bell (B.A., J.D.), judge of the United States District Court for the Western District of North Carolina
- Phil Berger Jr. (J.D.), associate judge of the North Carolina Supreme Court
- Rhoda Billings (J.D. 1966), professor; former chief justice of the North Carolina Supreme Court
- Joe Freeman Britt (B.A.), former district attorney of Robeson County, North Carolina
- William Earl Britt (B.S. 1956, LL.B 1958), former senior judge of United States District Court for the Eastern District of North Carolina
- Mark Christie (B.A., magna cum laude), attorney and member of the Federal Energy Regulatory Commission
- Sam Currin, United States attorney for the Eastern District of North Carolina, judge on the North Carolina Supreme Court
- William A. Devin (B.A.), former jurist and associate justice of the North Carolina Supreme Court
- Richard Dietz (J.D. 2002), associate justice on the North Carolina Supreme Court
- Elizabeth K. Dillon (J.D. 1986), chief U.S. district judge of the United States District Court for the Western District of Virginia
- Andrew Dimlich (J.D.), judge of 10th Circuit Court of West Virginia
- John E. Dowdell (B.A. 1978), chief judge of the United States District Court for the Northern District of Oklahoma
- Rusty Duke (B.A. 1970, J.D. 1974), judge
- Louise W. Flanagan (B.A. 1984), district judge for the United States District Court for the Eastern District of North Carolina
- Jerome B. Friedman (J.D. 1969), former United States district judge of the United States District Court for the Eastern District of Virginia
- Britt Grant (B.A.), U.S. circuit court judge, United States Court of Appeals for the 11th Circuit; former justice of Supreme Court of Georgia
- Major B. Harding (B.A., J.D.), attorney and former chief justice of the Florida Supreme Court
- Johnson Jay Hayes (LL.B. 1909), former United States district judge of the United States District Court for the Middle District of North Carolina
- Robert Higdon Jr. (B.A., J.D.), former United States attorney for the United States District Court for the Eastern District of North Carolina
- Jerome Holmes (B.A. 1983), judge on the United States Court of Appeals for the Tenth Circuit
- Malcolm Jones Howard (J.D. 1970), former U.S. district judge of the United States District Court for the Eastern District of North Carolina
- Tiffany R. Johnson (J.D. 2012), U.S. district judge of the United States District Court for the Northern District of Georgia
- Woodrow W. Jones (LL.B. 1937), former senior judge of United States District Court for the Western District of North Carolina
- I. Beverly Lake (B.S., J.D.), former chief justice of North Carolina
- John Davis Larkins Jr. (B.A. 1929), former chief and senior judge in the United States District Court for the Eastern District of North Carolina
- C. Hardaway Marks (B.A.), attorney
- Karen S. Marston (magna cum laude J.D. 1998), United States district judge of the United States District Court for the Eastern District of Pennsylvania
- John C. Martin (B.A. 1965, J.D. 1967), former chief judge of the North Carolina Court of Appeals
- Isaac Melson Meekins (A.B. 1896), former United States district judge of United States District Court for the Eastern District of North Carolina
- Steve Owens (J.D. 1980), attorney
- Eleni M. Roumel (B.A.), judge, United States Court of Federal Claims
- Davis R. Ruark (B.A.), former state's attorney for Wicomico County, Maryland
- Allison Jones Rushing (summa cum laude, B.A. 2004), United States circuit judge of the United States Court of Appeals for the Fourth Circuit
- Emory M. Sneeden (B.S. 1949, L.L.B. 1953), former judge on the United States Court of Appeals for the Fourth Circuit
- Edwin Monroe Stanley (LL.B. 1931), former United States district judge of United States District Court for the Middle District of North Carolina
- Chris Swecker (J.D. 1981), attorney and assistant director of the FBI for the CID
- Alan Z. Thornburg (J.D. 1996), former judge on the North Carolina Court of Appeals
- Norwood Carlton Tilley Jr. (B.S. 1966, J.D. 1969), senior United States district judge of the United States District Court for the Middle District of North Carolina
- Lycurgus R. Varser (B.A. 1899, J.D. 1901), former associate justice of North Carolina Supreme Court
- George L. Wainwright, Jr. (J.D. 1984), former associate justice of the North Carolina Supreme Court
- Hiram Hamilton Ward (LL.B. 1950), former United States district judge of United States District Court for the Middle District of North Carolina
- Samuel Grayson Wilson (J.D. 1974), former United States district judge of United States District Court for the Western District of Virginia

==== Mayors ====
- James Pratt Carter (B.A. 1961), former mayor of Madison, North Carolina
- Paul Coble (B.S.), former mayor of Raleigh, North Carolina
- Tom Fetzer (B.A.), former mayor of Raleigh, North Carolina
- Eddie Knox (J.D.), former 49th mayor of Charlotte, North Carolina
- Patrick Smathers (J.D.), former mayor of Canton, North Carolina

==== Military ====
- C. Forrest Faison III (B.A. 1980), retired vice admiral of the United States Navy, former surgeon general of the United States Navy
- Pat Foote (B.A. 1953) (retired – United States Army), brigadier general, first woman to be given brigade command; first female instructor at the Army War College
- Duvall Williams (B.S. 1965, J.D. 1968), former rear admiral of the United States Navy and commander of the Naval Criminal Investigative Service

==== Other political figures ====
- JB Akers (B.A.), member of West Virginia House of Delegates
- Lynton Y. Ballentine (B.A. 1921), 20th lieutenant governor of North Carolina
- C. Dan Barrett (B.A., J.D.), Republican candidate for governor of North Carolina in 2004
- Charlie Baum (B.A. 1995), member of Tennessee House of Representatives
- Phil Berger (J.D. 1982), Republican leader in the North Carolina State Senate
- Mary Wills Bode (B.A.), member of the North Carolina Senate
- W. E. Bradley (B.S.), member of the Alaska Senate
- Henry L. Bridges (B.A. 1931, J.D. 1933), former North Carolina state auditor
- Dennis G. Brummitt (B.A.), former North Carolina attorney general and speaker of the North Carolina House of Representatives
- Laura Budd (J.D. 2002), member of North Carolina House of Representatives
- Deb Butler (J.D. 1986), member of North Carolina House of Representatives
- J. Russell Capps (B.S. 1956), former member of North Carolina General Assembly
- Charles M. Cooke (attended), former speaker of the North Carolina House of Representatives and North Carolina secretary of state
- Roy Asberry Cooper Jr. (B.S. 1949), lawyer and Democratic Party strategist
- N. Leo Daughtry (B.A. 1962, L.L.B. 1965), former member of the North Carolina General Assembly
- Ted Davis Jr. (J.D.), member of the North Carolina House of Representatives
- Creigh Deeds (J.D. 1984), 2009 Democratic Party nominee for governor of Virginia
- Keith Denning (CRNA), member of Connecticut House of Representatives
- David Hunter Diamont, former member of the North Carolina House of Representatives
- Steven Dickerson (M.D.), former member of the Tennessee Senate
- Jimmy Dixon (B.S. 1969), member of North Carolina House of Representatives
- Jerry Dockham (B.S. 1972), former member of the North Carolina General Assembly
- Bobby Drakeford (MBA), member of North Carolina House of Representatives
- Mary P. Easley (B.A. 1972, J.D. 1975), First Lady of North Carolina
- Joe Ellington (M.D.), member of West Virginia House of Delegates
- James Forrester (B.S., J.D.), North Carolina state senator
- Emily Gregory (B.S. 2007), member of Florida House of Representatives
- Greg Habeeb (B.A. 1998, J.D. 2001), former Virginia state delegate representing Virginia's 8th House of Delegates District (2011–2018)
- Destin Hall (J.D. 2014), member of North Carolina House of Representatives
- Leslie C. Hardy (LL.B.), former member of Arizona Senate
- Patricia Hollingsworth Holshouser, First Lady of North Carolina
- Brandon Jones (MDiv), former member of the Mississippi House of Representatives
- Perrin Jones, former member of the North Carolina House of Representatives
- John H. Kerr Jr. (J.D.), former member of the North Carolina House of Representatives
- Donny Lambeth (M.B.A.), member of North Carolina House of Representatives
- Michael V. Lee (J.D.), member of North Carolina Senate
- Wiley F. Mitchell (B.A., J.D.), former member of the Virginia Senate
- Richard H. Moore (J.D. 1989), North Carolina treasurer
- Jack Nichols (J.D.), former member of North Carolina House of Representatives
- Arthur Orr (B.A.), member of Alabama Senate
- Thomas Jones Pence, former secretary of the Democratic National Committee
- Josh Pitcock (J.D.), former chief of staff to vice president Mike Pence under the first Trump administration
- Eric Miller Reeves (J.D. 1989), North Carolina state senator
- Alex Sink (B.A.), former 2nd chief financial officer of Florida (2007–2011); Democratic candidate for governor of Florida in 2010
- John J. Snow Jr. (B.A., J.D.), former member of North Carolina Senate
- James Snyder Jr. (B.A. 1967, J.D. 1970), former member of North Carolina House of Representatives
- R. C. Soles Jr. (B.A.), former member North Carolina Senate and North Carolina House of Representatives
- Brian Turner (M.B.A. 2010), member of North Carolina House of Representatives
- Michael Whatley (M.A.), chairman of the Republican National Committee
- Dennis A. Wicker (J.D. 1978), former member of the North Carolina House of Representatives and 31st lieutenant governor of North Carolina

=== Science ===
- William Bachovchin (B.S. 1970), chemist/chemical biologist, professor of Molecular and Chemical Biology at Tufts University School of Medicine
- Wendy Boss (B.S. 1968), botanist at North Carolina State University
- Kevin Cokley (B.A. 1991), psychologist
- John H. Crowe (B.A. 1965), physiologist
- Terri Fisher (B.A. 1975), psychologist
- Phillip Griffiths (B.S. 1959), mathematician; professor at the Institute for Advanced Study
- Kenneth M. Halanych (B.S.), zoologist; professor at Auburn University
- Angel Hsu (B.A. 2005), climatologist and environmental scientist
- Mona Jhaveri (Ph.D.), cancer researcher and entrepreneur focused on biotech funding
- Eric N. Olson (B.A., Ph.D.), molecular biologist
- Donald R. Ort (B.S. 1971), botanist and biochemist; Professor of Plant Biology and Crop Sciences at the University of Illinois at Urbana-Champaign
- LeShawndra Price (B.A.), psychologist
- Douglas D. Taylor (Ph.D.), entrepreneur and former academic researcher in the field of extracellular vesicles

=== Religion ===
- Len G. Broughton (D.D.), former Baptist minister at Christ Church, Lambeth
- John Wesley Chandler (B.A. 1945), Cluett Professor of Religion and department chair at Williams College
- James Malone Coleman (DMin 1975), former bishop of Episcopal Diocese of West Tennessee
- Jill Y. Crainshaw (B.A. 1984), theologian scholar
- Amzi Clarence Dixon (B.A. 1875), Baptist minister and author, older brother of Thomas Dixon, Jr.
- Thomas Dixon, Jr. (M.A. 1883), minister and novelist
- J. Cheryl Exum (B.A.), biblical scholar and emeritus professor at University of Sheffield
- Thomas Fraser (DDiv 1965), former bishop of Episcopal Diocese of North Carolina
- Tripp Fuller (M.Div.), theologist and minister
- Harry Y. Gamble (B.A.), former professor in the Department of Religious Studies at the University of Virginia
- John Howard (J.D. 1976), 8th bishop of the Episcopal Diocese of Florida
- Kimberly Lucas, bishop of The Episcopal Church in Colorado
- Ted G. Stone (B.A. 1956), Southern Baptist evangelist and recovered amphetamine addict
- Tish Harrison Warren (B.A. 2001), New York Times columnist and Anglican priest

=== Business ===
- Ross Atkins (B.A. 1991), executive, general manager of the Toronto Blue Jays
- Jabez A. Bostwick, founding partner of Standard Oil
- D. Wayne Calloway, former CEO of PepsiCo
- Charlie Ergen (M.B.A. 1976), co-founder and CEO of Dish Network and EchoStar
- David Farr (B.S.1977), CEO of Emerson Electric Company
- Robin Ganzert (B.S., M.B.A.), CEO of the American Humane organization
- Anil Rai Gupta (M.B.A.), chairman and managing director of Havells
- Andrew Holland (B.S. 2001), founder and CEO of the Fusion Industry Association
- Zach Klein (B.A.), co-founder of Vimeo
- Joseph W. Luter III (B.A. 1962), chairman of Smithfield Foods, Inc.
- David E. Orton (B.S.), engineering executive
- Kevin Scott (M.A.), chief technology officer at Microsoft
- Warren Stephens (M.B.A 1981), chairman, president and CEO, Stephens Inc.
- G. Kennedy Thompson (M.B.A), chairman, president and CEO, Wachovia Corp.
- Ricky Van Veen (B.S. 2003), head of global creative strategies at Facebook and co-creator of the website CollegeHumor
- Eric C. Wiseman (B.A., M.B.A.), chairman and chief executive officer, VF Corporation

=== Medicine ===
- Erin Calipari (Ph.D. 2013), pharmacology
- William T. Carpenter (M.D.), pharmacology
- Richard Cytowic (M.D.), neurology
- Max Gomez (Ph.D.), medical reporter
- David L. Heymann (M.D.), infectious disease
- Joseph Ladapo (B.A. 2000), surgeon general of Florida
- Willis Maddrey (B.A.), internal medicine and hepatology
- Thomas Marshburn (M.D. 1989), astronaut
- Diane Mathis (B.S.), immunohaematology
- Mary L. McMaster (M.D.), oncologist, senior clinical trial specialist at the National Cancer Institute
- J. Wayne Meredith (M.D. 1978), Richard T. Myers Professor and chair of the Department of Surgery, chief of Clinical Chairs and chief of Surgery at Atrium Health Wake Forest Baptist
- Patricia L. Turner (M.D.), general surgeon
- Cameron Webb (M.D. 2013), physician, former nominee for Virginia's 5th congressional district, current White House senior policy advisor for COVID-19 in the Biden administration
- Wendy Young (B.A. 1988, M.S. 1989), chemist

=== Athletics ===
==== Athletic administrators ====
- Sandy Barbour (B.S. 1980), former athletic director for Penn State University, University of California, Berkeley, and Tulane University
- John Currie (B.A. 1993), Wake Forest athletics director (2019–present)
- Michael Kelly (magna cum laude B.A. 1992), athletic director at the United States Naval Academy

==== American football ====
- Jon Abbate, linebacker in NFL, CFL and UFL, central figure in The 5th Quarter, film on Wake's 2006 season
- Ernie Accorsi (B.A. 1963), NFL executive
- Billy Ard (B.A. 1980), NFL player
- Stanley Arnoux (B.A. 2008), NFL linebacker, Super Bowl Champion
- Reggie Austin, NFL cornerback
- Alex Bachman (B.A. 2018), NFL wide receiver
- Hank Bachmeier (B.A. 2024), professional football player
- Gary Baldinger (B.A. 1985), NFL defensive tackle
- Rich Baldinger (B.A. 1981), NFL offensive lineman
- Elmer Barbour (B.A. 1944), NFL linebacker
- Chris Barclay (B.A. 2009), NFL running back
- Billy Ray Barnes (B.A. 1956), NFL halfback, 3x Pro-Bowler
- Carlos Basham Jr. (B.A. 2020), NFL linebacker
- Essang Bassey (B.A. 2020), NFL cornerback
- Jessie Bates, NFL safety for the Cincinnati Bengals
- Tommy Bohanon (B.A. 2012), NFL fullback for the Jacksonville Jaguars
- DJ Boldin (B.A. 2008), NFL wide receiver, current offensive assistant for the San Francisco 49ers
- Carlos Bradley, NFL linebacker
- Ed Bradley, former NFL player
- Ed Bradley Jr., former NFL player
- David Braxton (B.S. 1988), NFL linebacker
- Ronnie Burgess, NFL defensive back
- Josh Bush (B.A. 2011), NFL free safety, Super Bowl 50, Champion, currently a free agent
- Michael Campanaro (B.A. 2013), NFL wide receiver for the Baltimore Ravens
- Caelen Carson (B.A. 2023), NFL player
- Tyson Clabo (B.A. 2003), former NFL player, Pro-Bowler
- Jim Clack (B.A. 1969), NFL guard
- Desmond Clark (B.S. 1999), NFL tight end
- Topper Clemons (B.A. 1986), former NFL player
- George Coghill (B.A. 1993), retired NFL defensive back for the Denver Broncos
- Steve Colavito, former NFL player
- Matt Colburn (B.A. 2019), professional football player
- Ben Coleman (B.A. 1992), NFL offensive lineman
- Branson Combs (grad), NFL player
- Aaron Curry (B.A. 2009), NFL linebacker, No.4 pick in the 2009 NFL draft
- Chris Davis, former NFL player
- Thabiti Davis, former NFL player
- Jammie Deese (B.A. 1999), former professional football player
- Chris DeGeare, former NFL player
- Jack Dolbin, former NFL player
- Greg Dortch, NFL wide receiver
- Harry Dowda (B.A. 1948), NFL running back
- Kenny Duckett (B.A. 1980), NFL wide receiver
- Jim Duncan (B.A. 1949), former NFL player
- Marshall Edwards, former NFL player
- Duke Ejiofor (B.A. 2017), NFL linebacker, Houston Texans
- Mike Elkins (B.A. 1989), former NFL player
- Miles Fox (grad), professional football player
- Clark Gaines, NFL running back
- Tony Gallovich, former professional football player
- Bob Gaona, former NFL player
- Chelen Garnes (B.A. 2023), CFL player
- Josh Gattis (B.A. 2006), former NFL player
- Bill George (B.A. 1951), NFL linebacker
- Ed George, former NFL and CFL player
- Brandon Ghee (B.A. 2010), NFL cornerback
- Chris Givens, NFL wide receiver for the Baltimore Ravens
- Cam Glenn (B.A. 2018), CFL defensive back
- Bob Grant, NFL linebacker
- Matt Gulbin (attended four years; transferred to Michigan State University), NFL center
- Sam Hartman (B.A. 2022), NFL Quarterback
- Justin Herron (B.A. 2018), NFL offensive lineman
- Kendall Hinton (B.A. 2019), NFL wide receiver
- Kevin Johnson, defensive back for the Houston Texans
- Elmer Jones, former NFL player
- Michael Jurgens (B.A. 2023), NFL player for Minnesota Vikings
- Syd Kitson (B.A. 1981), NFL guard
- Dave LaCrosse (B.A. 1976), NFL linebacker
- Marquel Lee (B.A. 2016), NFL middle linebacker
- Joe Looney (B.A. 2011), NFL player for the Dallas Cowboys
- Luke Masterson, NFL player
- Tony Mayberry (B.A. 1989), former NFL player
- Michael McCrary (B.A. 1992), NFL defensive end, 2-time Pro-Bowler, Super Bowl XXXV Champion
- Bob McCreary (B.A. 1961), former NFL player
- John Henry Mills (B.A. 1993), NFL running back, linebacker and tight end; Pro-Bowl
- Kenneth Moore (B.A. 2007), former NFL player
- Ovie Mughelli (B.A. 2003), fullback for the Atlanta Falcons
- Malik Mustapha (B.A. 2023), NFL player
- Jamie Newman (B.A. 2019), NFL quarterback
- Harry Newsome (B.A. 1984), former NFL player
- Merrill Noel, former NFL player
- Calvin Pace (B.A. 2002), NFL defensive end
- James "Quick" Parker, retired professional football player, Canadian Football Hall of Fame
- Brian Piccolo, retired professional football player, former fullback for the Chicago Bears
- Ryan Plackemeier (B.A. 2005), punter for the Seattle Seahawks
- Tanner Price (B.A. 2013), professional football player
- Ricky Proehl (B.A. 1989), NFL wide receiver, Carolina Panthers wide receivers coach
- Walter Rasby, NFL tight end
- Fred Robbins (B.A. 2009), NFL defensive tackle for the New York Giants
- Jaquarii Roberson (B.A. 2021), CFL wide receiver
- J.J. Roberts (attended two years; transferred to Marshall University), NFL safety
- Jacob Roberts (B.A. 2023), CFL linebacker
- Anthony Rubino, NFL tackle for the Detroit Lions
- Montique Sharpe (B.A. 2002), former NFL player
- Alphonso Smith (B.A. 2008), former NFL player
- Norm Snead, NFL quarterback; four-time Pro Bowler
- Jim Staton, former NFL player
- John Stone, former NFL player
- Justin Strnad, NFL linebacker
- Freddie Summers, former NFL player
- Sage Surratt, professional football player
- Sam Swank, former NFL player
- Karl Sweetan, former NFL player
- Ja'Sir Taylor (B.A. 2021), NFL cornerback
- Zac Taylor (attended two years; transferred to Butler community college), NFL head coach for Cincinnati Bengals
- Larry Tearry (B.A. 1977), former professional football player
- Zach Tom (cum laude B.A. 2021), NFL player for Green Bay Packers
- Jyles Tucker (B.A. 2007), NFL linebacker
- Kobie Turner (grad), NFL player
- Chip Vaughn (B.A. 2009), former NFL player, Super Bowl XLIV, Champion with the New Orleans Saints
- Luiji Vilain (grad), NFL player for Carolina Panthers
- Kenneth Walker III (attended two years; transferred to Michigan State University), NFL running back for Kansas City Chiefs
- Blake Whiteheart (B.A. 2022), NFL player
- Nikita Whitlock (B.A. 2013), NFL player, current free agent
- Kyle Wilber (B.A. 2012), NFL linebacker, currently plays for the Las Vegas Raiders
- Ke'Shawn Williams (B.A. 2023), NFL player
- John Wolford (B.A. 2017), NFL quarterback
- Joe Zelenka, former professional football player
- Charlie Zimmerman (B.A. 1929), former college football player

==== Baseball ====
- Gair Allie, former MLB player
- Ryan Braun, former MLB pitcher
- Mike Buddie, former Major League Baseball pitcher for the Yankees and Brewers
- Chase Burns, MLB player for Cincinnati Reds
- Dave Bush, former MLB pitcher, currently a pitching coach
- Tommy Byrne, MLB player, 1949 and 1956 World Series champion with the New York Yankees
- Rip Coleman, MLB player, 1956 World Series champion with the New York Yankees
- Will Craig, first round pick in the 2016 MLB draft
- Ryan Cusick, MLB player for Athletics
- Bill Dillman, MLB player
- Parker Dunshee, MLB player for the Oakland Athletics
- Allan Dykstra, MLB player
- Stuart Fairchild, current MLB player for the Cincinnati Reds
- Lee Gooch, former MLB player
- Tommy Gregg, former MLB player
- Erik Hanson, former MLB player
- Josh Hartle, MLB player
- Marek Houston, MLB player
- Kevin Jarvis, former MLB pitcher, currently a scout for the San Diego Padres
- C. B. Johnston, former baseball player and coach
- Seaver King, MLB player for Washington Nationals
- Nick Kurtz, MLB player
- Tom Lanning, former MLB player
- Buddy Lewis, former MLB player, 2x MLB All-Star
- Rhett Lowder, MLB pitcher for Cincinnati Reds
- Mike MacDougal, former MLB relief pitcher, MLB All-Star
- Willard Marshall, former MLB player, three-time MLB All-Star
- Bill Masse, former professional baseball player
- Jack Meyer, former MLB player, Philadelphia Phillies
- Camden Minacci, MLB player
- Nate Mondou, MLB player
- Doyt Morris, former MLB player
- Griffin Roberts, MLB player; free agent
- Craig Robinson, former MLB player
- Warren Sawkiw, former professional baseball player
- Ray Scarborough, retired MLB player, 10 MLB seasons, MLB All-Star, 1952 World Series champion with the New York Yankees
- Bob Seymour, MLB player
- Gavin Sheets, 49th pick in the 2017 MLB draft, current MLB player for the Chicago White Sox organization
- Jared Shuster, MLB pitcher, first round 2020 MLB draft pick of the Atlanta Braves
- Kyle Sleeth, No.3 overall pick in MLB draft, former MLB player
- Brick Smith, former MLB player
- Shane Smith, MLB player
- Jack Stallings, former professional baseball player and coach
- Cory Sullivan, former MLB player
- Sean Sullivan, MLB player
- Brock Wilken, MLB player
- Mac Williamson, former MLB player
- Larry Woodall, former MLB player

==== Basketball ====
- Al-Farouq Aminu, former NBA player
- Tyree Appleby (grad), professional basketball player
- Muggsy Bogues (B.A. 1987), former NBA player, 14 years in the NBA, played for the Charlotte Hornets, Washington Bullets, Golden State Warriors, and Toronto Raptors, shortest NBA player of all time, standing 5 ft 3 in (1.60 m) (jersey retired)
- Brenda Mock Brown (B.A. 2001), former college basketball player for Wake Forest Demon Deacons women's basketball, head coach for East Tennessee State Buccaneers women's basketball
- Chaundee Brown Jr. (attended three years; transferred to University of Michigan), professional basketball player
- Skip Brown (B.A. 1977), former college basketball player and athletic director for Wake Forest, selected by the Boston Celtics in the 1977 NBA draft
- Dave Budd (B.A. 1960), former center for the New York Knicks
- Andrew Carr (B.A. 2024), professional basketball player
- Len Chappell (B.A. 1962), former NBA player (jersey retired)
- Brandon Childress (B.A. 2020), professional basketball player
- Randolph Childress (B.A. 1995), former professional basketball player who last played in Italy for Cestistica San Severo, current assistant coach for the Wake Forest Demon Deacons
- John Collins, 19th overall pick in the 2017 NBA draft, currently plays for the Los Angeles Clippers
- Bryant Crawford, professional basketball player for Hapoel Ironi Eilat of the Israeli Basketball Premier League
- Charlie Davis (B.A. 1990), former NBA player for the Cleveland Cavaliers and Portland Trail Blazers, fourth-team All-American, 1971 ACC Player of the Year (jersey retired)
- Ian DuBose (grad), professional basketball player
- Tim Duncan (B.A. 1997), retired NBA player, #1 overall pick in 1997 NBA draft, 15-time NBA All-Star, two-time NBA MVP, five-time NBA Champion, member of Naismith Memorial Basketball Hall of Fame (jersey retired)
- Justin Gray (B.A. 2006), former professional basketball player for BC Tsmoski-Minsk
- Murray Greason, former college basketball and baseball coach, 1956 ACC Coach of the Year
- Kenny Green, #12 pick of the 1985 NBA draft, former NBA player for Washington Bullets and Philadelphia 76ers
- Rod Griffin (B.A. 1978), 17th pick of the 1978 NBA draft, former professional basketball player
- Dearica Hamby (B.A. 2015), #6 pick in the 2015 WNBA draft, currently plays for Los Angeles Sparks
- C. J. Harris (B.A. 2013), basketball player in the Israeli Basketball Premier League
- Dickie Hemric (B.A. 1955), former NBA player, 1957 NBA champion with the Boston Celtics (jersey retired)
- Cameron Hildreth (B.A. 2025), British basketball player
- Jaylen Hoard, French-American basketball player for Hapoel Tel Aviv of the Israeli Basketball Premier League
- Jennifer Hoover (B.A. 1991), current assistant coach of the Virginia Tech women's basketball team
- Josh Howard (B.A. 2003), former NBA player, forward-guard for the Washington Wizards NBA team (jersey retired)
- Ralph James, former football and basketball head coach
- Frank Johnson (B.A. 1981), #11 pick in the 1981 NBA draft
- James Johnson, small forward for the Dallas Mavericks NBA team
- Jim Johnstone (B.A. 1982), former professional basketball player
- Chris King (B.A. 1992), retired professional basketball player
- Bobi Klintman, professional basketball player
- Jake LaRavia, NBA player for Los Angeles Lakers
- Rusty LaRue (B.A. 1996), former NBA player
- Nicole Levesque (B.A. 1994), former professional basketball player (WNBA)
- Paul Long, former NBA and ABA basketball player
- Chas McFarland (B.A. 2010), former professional basketball player
- Gil McGregor, former NBA player, CBA champion
- Codi Miller-McIntyre (B.A. 2016), professional basketball player for Parma Basket
- Dinos Mitoglou, Greek professional basketball player for Panathinaikos
- Doral Moore, professional basketball player
- Guy Morgan (B.A. 1982), former NBA player
- Jack Murdock (B.A. 1957), former basketball player and coach
- Billy Packer (B.A. 1962), CBS Sports college basketball analyst
- Chris Paul, #3 overall pick in 2005 NBA draft, 2005–2006 NBA Rookie of the Year, 12-time NBA All-Star (jersey retired)
- Eddie Payne, former college basketball head coach at University of South Carolina Upstate
- Elisa Penna (B.A. 2019), professional basketball player
- Ricardo Peral Antunez (B.A. 1997), former Spanish professional basketball player
- Ivana Raca (B.A. 2021), professional basketball player
- Efton Reid (B.A. 2025), professional basketball player
- Troy Rike (B.A. 2018), professional basketball player
- Rodney Rogers, 9th overall pick of the 1993 NBA draft, former NBA player (jersey retired)
- Delaney Rudd (B.A. 1985), former professional basketball player
- Hunter Sallis (B.A. 2025), NBA player for the Philadelphia 76ers
- Olivier Sarr (attended three years; transferred to University of Kentucky), professional basketball player
- Alexandra Sharp (B.A. 2020), professional basketball player
- Jamie Skeen (attended two years; transferred to Virginia Commonwealth University), professional basketball player
- Ish Smith (B.A. 2010), former NBA player for the Washington Wizards
- Darius Songaila (B.A. 2002), former NBA player for Washington Wizards, previously Sacramento Kings and Chicago Bulls
- Lisa Stockton (B.A. 1986), former college basketball player for Wake Forest Demon Deacons women's basketball and former college basketball coach
- Anthony Teachey (B.A. 1984), former professional basketball player
- Jeff Teague, former NBA player, NBA Champion
- Devin Thomas (B.A. 2016), professional basketball player
- Anthony Tucker (B.A. 1992), former professional basketball player
- Kyle Visser (B.A. 2007), former basketball player who last played for Phantoms Braunschweig of the German Bundesliga
- Ty Walker (B.A. 2012), former professional basketball player
- Ron Watts (B.A. 1965), former NBA player with Boston Celtics, 1966 NBA Champion
- David Weaver (B.A. 2010), professional basketball player
- Alondes Williams (grad), NBA player for Miami Heat
- Coron Williams (B.A. 2014), former professional basketball player
- Eric Williams (B.A. 2006), former professional basketball player
- L. D. Williams (B.A. 2010), former professional basketball player
- Pat Williams (B.S. 1962), senior vice president of the Orlando Magic
- Keyshawn Woods (attended two years; transferred to Ohio State University), professional basketball player
- Loren Woods (attended two years; transferred to University of Arizona), former professional basketball player
- Bob Woollard, former professional basketball player
- Danny Young, former NBA player for the Portland Trail Blazers

==== Golf ====
- Billy Andrade, PGA Tour
- Larry Beck, PGA Tour
- Jean Chua (B.A. 2009), professional golfer
- Darren Clarke, European Tour, PGA Tour
- Brenda Corrie-Kuehn (B.A. 1986), former amateur golfer
- Laura Diaz, LPGA Tour
- Alex Fitzpatrick (B.A. 2022), professional golfer, European Tour, PGA Tour
- Brendan Gielow, professional golfer
- Bill Haas, PGA Tour
- Jay Haas, PGA Tour, Champions Tour
- Jerry Haas, PGA Tour, Nationwide Tour, European Tour
- Gary Hallberg, PGA Tour, Nationwide Tour, European Tour
- Scott Hoch, Ryder Cup
- Joe Inman, PGA Tour, Champions Tour
- Patty Jordan, LPGA Tour
- Ólafía Þórunn Kristinsdóttir (B.A. 2014), former professional golfer
- Rachel Kuehn (B.A. 2023), amateur golfer
- Jennifer Kupcho (B.A. 2019), LPGA Tour
- Ines Laklalech, professional golfer; LPGA Tour
- Carolina López-Chacarra (B.A. 2025), amateur golfer
- Len Mattiace (B.A. 1990), PGA Tour
- Emilia Migliaccio (B.A. 2021), amateur golfer
- Arnold Palmer (B.A. 1954), PGA Tour, Champions Tour, winner of seven major championships
- Marta Prieto, Ladies European Tour
- Kyle Reifers, PGA Tour
- Mimi Rhodes (B.A. 2024), professional golfer
- Webb Simpson, PGA Tour, winner of 2012 U.S. Open
- Curtis Strange, PGA Tour, Champions Tour, winner of the 1988 and 1989 U.S. Opens
- Lanny Wadkins, PGA Tour, Champions Tour, winner of 1977 PGA Championship
- Helen Wadsworth, Ladies European Tour
- Lauren Walsh (B.A. 2023), professional golfer
- Cheyenne Woods (B.A. 2012), Ladies European Tour, LPGA Tour; niece of Tiger Woods
- Cameron Young (B.A. 2019), professional golfer, PGA Tour
- Will Zalatoris (B.A. 2023), professional golfer, PGA Tour

==== Olympians ====
- Andy Bloom (M.A. 1998), Olympic shot putter
- Houry Gebeshian (M.A. 2014), competed at the 2016 Summer Olympics
- Michelle Kasold (B.A. 2009), field hockey, London 2012
- Hunter Kemper (B.A. 1998), triathlon, 2000 Summer Olympics, 2004 Summer Olympics, 2008 Summer Olympics, 2012 Summer Olympics
- Brent LaRue, Olympic athlete (hurdler)

==== Soccer ====
- Laurel Ansbrow (B.A. 2024), professional soccer player
- Anthony Arena, professional soccer player
- Luis Argudo, MLS soccer player who currently plays for Columbus Crew SC
- Cody Arnoux, professional soccer player
- Jon Bakero, Spanish soccer player who currently plays for Chicago Fire of Major League Soccer
- Hannah Betfort (B.A. 2020), professional soccer player
- Corben Bone, professional soccer player for FC Cincinnati
- Evan Brown, retired professional soccer player
- Ryanne Brown (B.A. 2021), professional soccer player
- Brian Carroll, Major League Soccer, Philadelphia Union
- Ryan Caugherty, Korean retired professional soccer player
- Zara Chavoshi (B.A. 2024), professional soccer player
- Roxanne Chow (B.A. 2001), former professional soccer player
- Emily Colton (B.A. 2024), professional soccer player
- Neil Covone, retired professional soccer player
- Sam Cronin, professional soccer player who currently plays for Minnesota United of Major league Soccer
- Steven Curfman, American soccer player who currently plays for CASL Elite
- Austin da Luz, professional soccer player for North Carolina FC
- Bianca D'Agostino, retired professional soccer player
- Raimo de Vries, former professional soccer player
- Giovanna DeMarco (B.S. 2021), professional soccer player
- Ihor Dotsenko (magna cum laude B.S. 1997), retired Dutch-American soccer player
- Chris Duvall, professional soccer player for Portland Timbers of Major league Soccer
- Steven Echevarria (B.A. 2017), professional soccer player for New York Red Bulls II
- Brian Edwards (B.A. 2007), retired professional soccer player
- Chris Estridge, former professional soccer player
- Bayley Feist (B.A. 2018), professional soccer player
- Sam Fink (B.A. 2014), professional soccer player who currently plays for Saint Louis FC of USL
- Akira Fitzgerald, current professional soccer player for Tampa Bay Rowdies
- Kaley Fountain, professional soccer player
- Michael Gamble (2015), current professional soccer player for Tulsa Roughnecks in USL
- John Hackworth, former professional soccer player, current head coach of the United States men's National Under-17 Soccer team
- Madison Hammond (2019), professional soccer player
- Ally Haran (2017), professional soccer player
- Ian Harkes, professional soccer player for D.C. United
- Jack Harrison, #1 overall pick in the 2016 MLS SuperDraft, currently plays for Middlesbrough F.C. on loan from Manchester City F.C.
- Jacori Hayes, professional soccer player for FC Dallas
- William Hesmer, retired professional soccer player
- Kelvin Jones, former professional soccer player
- Stephen Keel, professional soccer player
- Aubrey Kingsbury (née Bledsoe), professional soccer player for Washington Spirit
- Michael Lahoud, professional soccer player for FC Cincinnati
- Michael Lisch, professional soccer player
- Amir Lowery, professional soccer player
- Andrew Lubahn, professional soccer player for Pittsburgh Riverhounds SC
- Zen Luzniak, former professional soccer player
- Collin Martin, professional soccer player for Minnesota United
- Trina Maso de Moya (B.A. 2002), former professional soccer player
- Kristen Meier, professional soccer player
- Nick Millington, retired professional soccer player
- Justin Moose, Major League Soccer, D.C. United
- Ben Newnam, professional soccer player
- Sean Okoli, professional soccer player for Landskrona BoIS
- Matthew Olson, retired professional soccer player
- Ike Opara, professional soccer player for Sporting Kansas City
- Marisa Park, professional soccer player
- Michael Parkhurst, 2005 Major League Soccer Rookie of the Year, New England Revolution
- Peyton Perea (2018), professional soccer player
- Pat Phelan, Major League Soccer player for Toronto FC
- Kevin Politz, professional soccer player for New York Red Bulls
- Sam Raben (born 1997), professional soccer player
- James Riley, Major League Soccer player for the New England Revolution
- Jalen Robinson, professional soccer player for D.C. United
- Andy Rosenband, professional soccer player for Chicago Storm
- Zack Schilawski, professional soccer player
- Scott Sealy, Major League Soccer player for the Kansas City Wizards
- Ryan Solle, professional soccer player
- Katie Stengel (2013), professional soccer player for Utah Royals FC
- Wells Thompson, MLS player, Colorado Rapids

==== Tennis ====
- Siddhant Banthia, professional tennis player
- Bea Bielik, former professional tennis player
- Romain Bogaerts, Belgian tennis player
- Bar Tzuf Botzer, professional tennis player
- Petros Chrysochos, professional tennis player
- Rrezart Cungu, professional tennis player
- Laird Dunlop, former professional tennis player
- Menelaos Efstathiou, professional tennis player
- Borna Gojo, Croatian tennis player
- Mark Greenan, former professional tennis player
- Jeff Landau, 1994 U.S. amateur champion
- Skander Mansouri, professional tennis player
- Eduardo Nava, professional tennis player
- Cory Parr, former professional tennis player
- Noah Rubin, Wimbledon junior singles champion
- Christian Seraphim, German professional tennis player

==== Other alumni ====
- Emmanuel K. Akyeampong (M.A. 1989), professor of history and African-American studies at Harvard University
- Annie Bersagel, long distance runner
- Gregory Brooks, professional poker player
- Christopher Crittenden (B.A. 1921, M.A. 1922), former executive of the North Carolina Historical Commission
- Glenda Gilmore (B.A.), historian of the American South at Yale University
- Claire Kretzschmar (attended), ballet dancer and choreographer

== Faculty ==
=== Current and former faculty ===
==== Academic faculty ====
- William Allan, genetics, Wake Forest School of Medicine
- John A. Allison IV, School of Business
- Karl-Erik Andersson, pharmacology, Wake Forest Institute for Regenerative Medicine
- Maya Angelou, American studies
- Anthony Atala, Urology (chair)
- Adrian Bardon, professor of philosophy
- Shari Barkin, Pediatrics
- Ruth Benca, Behavioral Medicine
- Margaret Bender, Anthropology
- Deborah L. Best (B.A., M.A.), Psychology
- Rhoda Billings, Law (emerita)
- Pasco Bowman II, Law
- Allison Brashear, Neurology
- Alfred Brauer, Mathematics
- Coy Cornelius Carpenter, M.D., dean of the School of Medicine of Wake Forest University 1936–1967 and vice president for health affairs 1963–67
- David Carroll, Physics, director of the Center for Nanotechnology and Molecular Materials
- Justin Catanoso (M.A.), Journalism
- John Wesley Chandler, Philosophy
- Bobby Chesney, Law
- David Coates, Anglo-American Studies
- Paul M. Cobb, History
- Jennifer Collins, Law
- Carla Cotwright-Williams, Mathematics
- Brainerd Currie, Law
- Kate Daniels, Poetry
- Hue Davies, Chemistry
- Samuel A. Derieux, English
- James C. Eisenach, Wake Forest School of Medicine
- Robinson Everett, Wake Forest School of Law
- David Faber, Art and printmaking
- Jacquelyn S. Fetrow, Physics & Computer Science
- William Fleeson, Psychology
- Mary F. Foskett, Religious studies
- Julie Ann Freischlag, Wake Forest School of Medicine
- Michele Gillespie, Southern History
- Cullen B. Gosnell, Political Science
- Roger S. Gottlieb, Jewish studies, Wake Forest University Divinity School
- Melissa Harris-Perry, Presidential Chair Professor of Politics and International Affairs
- Jay B. Hubbell, Literature
- Dan Locklair, Music and composer-in-residence
- Allen Mandelbaum, English and Humanities
- Lawrence C. McHenry Jr., professor of neurology
- Hubert McNeill Poteat, B.A., M.A., PhD (Columbia), professor of classics (Latin)
- Suzanne Reynolds (J.D. 1977), Law
- Earl Smith, professor
- Iyiola Solanke, visiting professor for European Union law
- Barry E. Stein, Wake Forest University School of Medicine
- Barry Trachtenberg, Jewish studies
- Phyllis Trible, Wake Forest University School of Divinity
- Kent Vrana, Wake Forest University School of Medicine
- Corey D. B. Walker, Wake Forest School of Divinity
- Jonathan L. Walton, dean of Wake Forest School of Divinity
- Sarah Watts, History
- Chris Webber, former NBA all-star, professor in practice for Masters of Arts in Sports program
- Robert Whaples, Economics
- Tanya Zanish-Belcher, professor, director of Special Collections and Archives

==== Athletic faculty ====
- Jeff Bzdelik, coach of Wake Forest Demon Deacons men's basketball (2010–2014)
- Jim Caldwell, coach of Wake Forest Football (1993–2000), current NFL head coach
- Dave Clawson, head coach of Wake Forest Football (2014–2025)
- Jake Dickert, head coach of Wake Forest Football (2025–present)
- Steve Forbes, head coach of Wake Forest men's basketball (2020–present)
- Dino Gaudio, coach of Wake Forest Demon Deacons men's basketball (2007–2010)
- Megan Gebbia, current head coach of Wake Forest Women's basketball
- Jim Grobe, head coach of Wake Forest football (2001–2013), won ACC Coach of the Year
- Jennifer Hoover, head coach of Wake Forest Women's basketball (2012–2022)
- Danny Manning, Wake Forest men's basketball coach (2014–2020)
- Jack McCloskey, coach of Wake Forest men's basketball (1966–1972)
- Dave Odom, coach of Wake Forest men's basketball (1989–2001), three-time ACC Coach of the Year
- Taylor Sanford, coach of Wake Forest Baseball (1951–1955)
- Tom Walter, current coach of Wake Forest baseball (2010–present)
