= Eisenach (disambiguation) =

Eisenach is a town in Thuringia, Germany.

Eisenach may also refer to:

- Eisenach, Rhineland-Palatinate, a municipality in the district of Bitburg-Prüm, Rhineland-Palatinate, Germany
- Eisenach station, the main station of the city of Eisenach, Thuringia, Germany
- 10774 Eisenach, an asteroid

== People ==
- Franz Eisenach (1918–1998), German Luftwaffe fighter ace
- James C. Eisenach, American anesthesiologist
- Jeffrey Eisenach, American economist
