= First date =

Part of dating process of two individuals

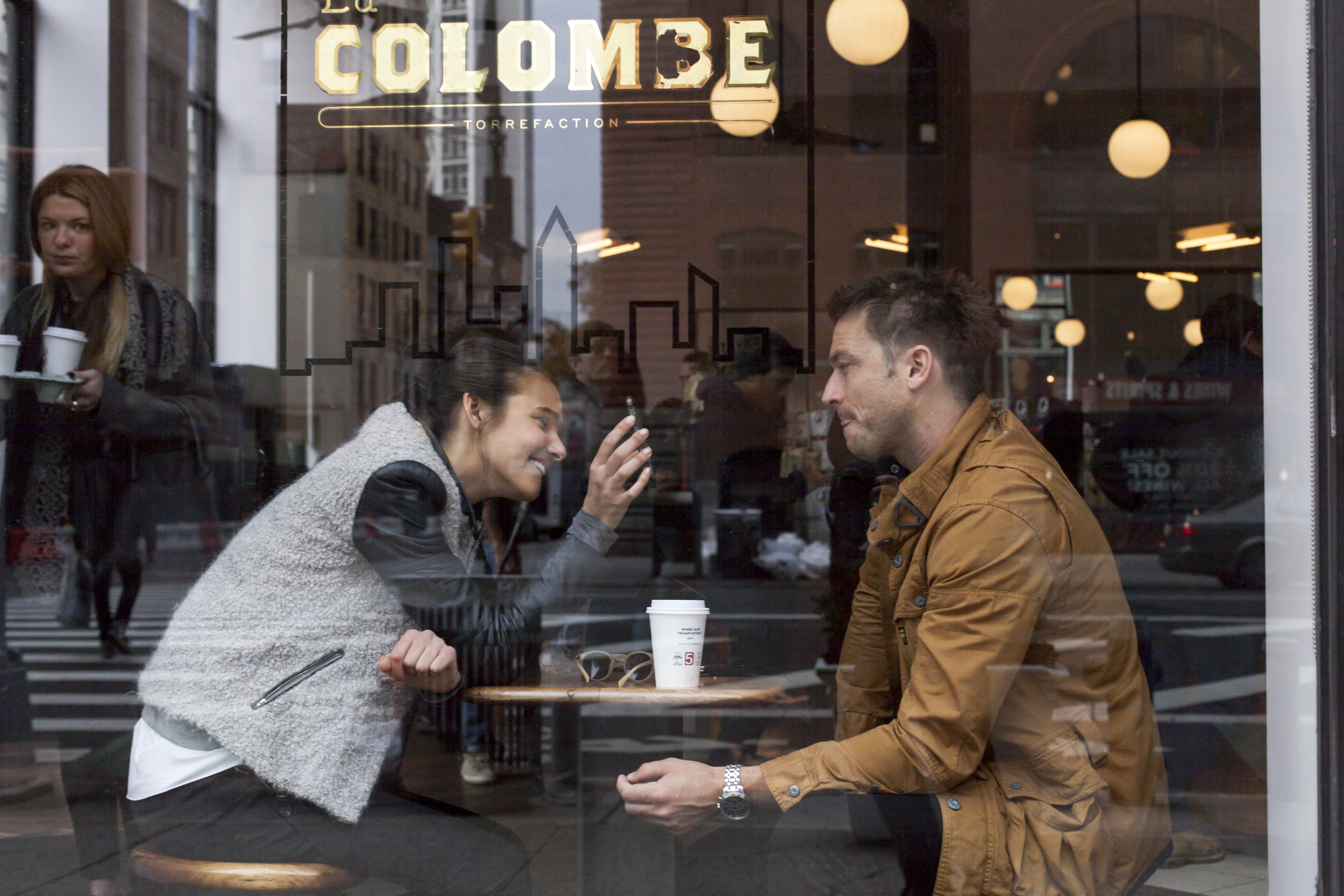
A common first date at a coffee shop

A first date is the initial meeting during the dating process of two individuals, in which an effort is made to ask about each other, plan a potential relationship, or organize some sort of romantic activity. Aims vary between finding a romantic, platonic, or sexual partner for a short period, to finding a long-term spouse. Dating can vary between cultures, lifestyles, religion, gender, and sexual orientation.

In many countries and cultures, it is the process in which romantic relationships are developed and future spouses are found. Some people go on first dates to evaluate a person's potential as a sexual partner. Often, people have dates arranged for them by their friends, or they meet the individual at work, a party, in class, in their community or online on a social media website or dating website. During the date, each participant can evaluate the compatibility of the other person and get the opportunity to screen out individuals who engage in behaviour that a person does not prefer.

There are many possible outcomes on the conclusion of a first date. The two individuals may agree to a second date. One or both parties may decide that there are incompatibility issues and decide not to pursue further dates. Compatibility factors vary a great deal, and can include religion, whether or not a person uses drugs or alcohol, appearance, or personality. Alternatively, the two parties may decide to become friends or some other type of platonic relationship. Some first dates may lead to a romantic relationship that can range in duration from a short period to a long period.

== Purpose and goals ==
In one sense, the purpose of a first date is the same as the purpose of any subsequent date: it is an opportunity for the two people to meet. However, the first date differs in that it is often used to screen potential dating candidates. If a person displays behaviors deemed to be problematic, the other person may decide to not meet again. In some cases, one or both parties may decide to end the date before the end of the activity they are engaged in. Because they often set the tone for the relationship, first dates are highly important. As the study by Mary Claire Morr Serewicz of the Department of Human Communication Studies at the University of Denver, and Paul Mongeau of Arizona State University, states that first dates "represent an important early event in the development of dating relationship."

In the 2004 study done by Mongeau, he quotes Roscoe, who identifies six purposes for dating:

- Recreation (to have fun)
- Socialization (to get to know the partner)
- Status grading (increasing social status by dating an attractive partner)
- Companionship (finding a friend to do things with)
- Mate selection/courtship (finding a spouse)
- Intimacy (establishing a meaningful relationship)

Mongeau's research shows that the term "date" can be condensed into four subcategories:

- Dyadic: The purpose for which the date is occurring between two individuals.
- Date cycle: Includes the major behavior components of a date.
- Positive interaction expectancies: Implies that dates allow each other a chance to get to know one another in a comfortable environment.
- Sexual overtones: Refers to the part of the date where romantic relationships may develop or include sexual attraction or expectation.

These components are the basis of a date, making up its structure and providing the involved a starting place from which to begin the dating process.

People on first dates are usually relatively aware of their expectations regarding the outcome of the date. "Evaluation of a date may depend, in part, on the extent to which persons reach their goals." Goals are fluid, meaning said goals may change over the course of a date. For example, a person may go into a date with the aim of establishing a friendship but at some time during the date decide to pursue a romantic relationship.

Goals depend on the individual, but for the most part, goals on the first date are fairly similar between parties. In her study on first dates, Mary Claire Morr explains that expectations for a date can be formed based on information about the communicator, relationship and context.

Communicator characteristics include all of the features of the individual, such as personality, physical appearance, and communication style. These characteristics can lead the partner to predict how the other will communicate in a "dating" situation. The relationship factor involves characteristics that describe the relationship between the two individuals. These factors include the degree of familiarity, liking, attraction, or similarity. The context feature involves aspects like the environment and the situations the individuals are in such as privacy, formality, and task oriented. These situations either enhance or diminish the interaction on the date and help maintain and structure individual's goals.

First dates are designed to produce a number of relationship outcomes. (e.g., sexual partner, friendship, short-term romantic relationship, or life partnership.) However, as Mongeau says "the desired relationship outcome (if any) is, of course, not directly observable." Mongeau quotes Theiss and Solomon, who have done many scholarly articles on dating, stating that first dates are very important because partners are both getting to know each other and attempting to establish a relationship definition as well. The three most common goals that people have on first dates are to reduce uncertainty, achieve relational escalation, and to have fun.

As mentioned in the last section, men and women, when dating, have goals and expectations. They are looking for certain qualities and characteristics in a person that they wish to have as their immediate companion. According to a study about sex differences in human behavior by Alice Eagly and Wendy Wood, professors in Psychology at Northwestern University, both men and women are looking for certain attractiveness that fits their taste and style. The study states "the value of attractiveness stems from its perceived association with the ability to provide sexual pleasure." This means that attractiveness suggests information about "sexual warmth" or sexual arousal. If this is true, then men will typically seek sexiness in a partner. However, Wood and Eagly also say "given that the female gender role contains sexual restraint and lacks sexual autonomy, women place less importance on sexiness in a partner."

== Dating norms ==
Mongeau's 2007 study on dates and first date goals quotes Beth Bailey of the University of Chicago, as well as Sally Lloyd of Miami University with an emphasis in family studies. These researchers show that specific dating norms have been around for a long time but have often shifted from generation to generation. Many studies have been done on dating scripts and norms. In a study done by Suzanna Rose of the University of Missouri and Irene Hanson Frieze of the University of Pittsburgh, published in the Journal of Gender and Society, they quote Ginsberg, who writes that scripts "are types of schema used to organize our experiences and are usually composed of a set of stereotypical actions."

In the Journal of Family Issues, Laner describes that these scripts are what allow people to predict the actions of others and serve as guidelines for their own decisions on how to react to the other person. Studies done by Mongeau, Laner, and Knox all show that first dates tend to be more "traditional" from start to finish.

=== Gendered expectations and goals ===
==== By women ====
Women look for certain cues on a first date: For example, it is important to a woman to find out if the man is courteous or not. Women will look for this by observing if the man comes to the door to pick her up or compliments her on how she looks, for example. If some of her expectations are not met, mainly the most important ones, she will not want to pursue anything more than a friendship. If the expectations are met, a second date might be in the future, but only if the man is feeling the same thing. Overall, on a first date, women's goals are related more to establishing friendships and having fun. Mongeau, in his 2004 study found that 60 percent of women go on first dates mainly to have fun and 59 percent go on dates to reduce uncertainty (Note, however, that there are some errors in the mathematical calculations done in the study, and the study is statistically invalid as it uses the convenience sampling method). Women's goals tend to be more relationship-oriented than men's goals. Also, unlike men, women are usually more reserved when it comes to the sexual aspect and having sex. Women are more likely to express companionship, friendship, and romantic relationship goals than men and are also more likely to consider the first date in terms of their relational implications than men.

==== By men ====
Unlike women, men overall have a higher expectation for sexual goals. They are typically more concerned with the sexual aspect of a woman and a relationship. Studies done by Antonia Abbey of Wayne State University and other colleagues indicate that men tend to perceive people and relationships in more of a sexualized manner than women do.

Abbey also argues that "Men may be socialized to attend more carefully than women to potentially sexual cues and are, therefore, more likely to interpret a variety of stimuli as a sign of sexual intent." Men tend to read into women's actions more sexually than women would read into men's actions. For example, men might find tickling to mean that the woman is very interested while to women it might just be a way of flirting or joking around. This can lead to some problems and possibly awkward encounters. Abbey also says that men tend to have a more sexual outlook and oftentimes perceive situations more sexually than women might; therefore, men could then feel that sexual advances are appropriate and justified whereas a woman may not be thinking so.

Abbey's studies might seem at first glance to corroborate the theory that men tend to be more sexually attracted to the opposite sex. However, recent research by evolutionary psychologists and others suggests that the difference in attraction is exaggerated or nonexistent. A study by sexologist Terri Fisher, for example, concludes that previous studies are flawed in that women are seldom given sufficient anonymity when responding to surveys and interviews, and that women give answers that suggest that women have a sexual attraction for the opposite similar to that of men when greater levels of confidentiality are provided. Conversely, men are "socialized" to exaggerate such things as the number of partners that they have had. Fisher concludes that, "Evidence clearly points to the fact that the gender difference in reported sex partners between men and women is an illusory difference created by attitudes related to sexual success as prestigious which in turn impact self-reports."

=== Gender egalitarian norms ===
In gender egalitarian dating and homosexual dating the norms for first date can be different.

== Effect of alcohol ==
A factor that could influence dating scripts is the availability of alcohol, which is sold in many Western restaurants and in all licensed bars. In Mongeau's 2004 study, he quotes Barbara Leigh of the University of Washington, who in her article on alcohol says that "it is a familiar idea that alcohol reduces inhibitions and increases sexual response." William H. George, also of the University of Washington, focuses his research on the influence of alcohol on sexual behavior and has discovered that, when alcohol is involved, sex between friends occurs more frequently. On the other hand, women are more concerned that their actions might be misinterpreted if alcohol is involved.
