= Catanoso =

Catanoso is a surname. Notable people with the surname include:

- Gaetano Catanoso (1879–1963), Italian Catholic priest
- Justin Catanoso (born 1959), American journalist and memoirist
