= Tim Maudlin =

American philosopher of science (born 1958)

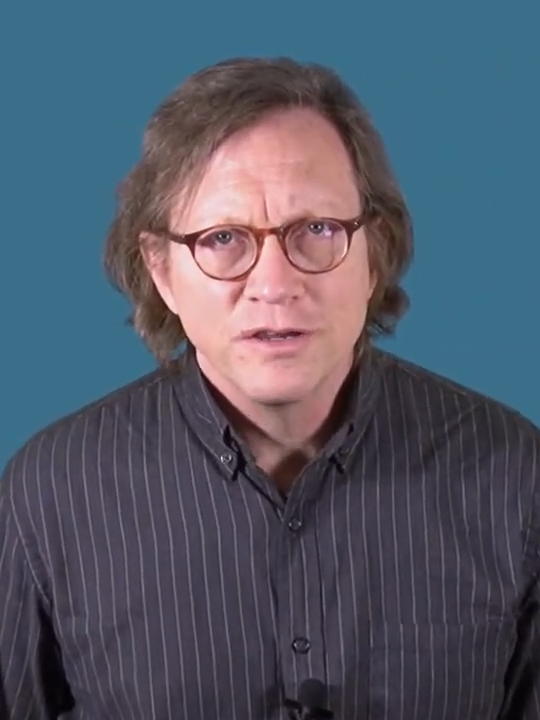
- Maudlin in 2018
- Born: Tim William Eric Maudlin; April 23, 1958 (age 68); Washington, D.C., U.S.

Education
- Education: University of Pittsburgh; Yale University
- Doctoral advisor: Clark Glymour

Philosophical work
- Era: Contemporary philosophy
- Region: Western philosophy
- School: Analytic philosophy
- Institutions: Rutgers University; New York University
- Notable students: Jonathan Schaffer
- Main interests: Philosophy of science, philosophy of physics
- Notable ideas: Mathematicism

Tim William Eric Maudlin (born April 23, 1958) is an American philosopher of science who has done influential work on the metaphysical foundations of physics and logic.

== Education and career ==
Maudlin graduated from Sidwell Friends School, Washington, D.C. Later he studied physics and philosophy at Yale University, and history and philosophy of science at the University of Pittsburgh, where he received his Ph.D. in 1986. He taught for more than two decades at Rutgers University before joining the Department of Philosophy at New York University in 2010.

Maudlin has also been a visiting professor at Harvard University and Carnegie Mellon University. He is a member of the "Foundational Questions Institute" of the Académie Internationale de Philosophie des Sciences and has received a Guggenheim Fellowship. In 2015 he was elected a fellow of the American Academy of Arts & Sciences. He is the founder of the John Bell Institute for the Foundations of Physics in Sveta Nedilja, Hvar, Croatia.

Since the academic year 2020–21 Maudlin is Visiting Professor at the University of Italian Switzerland.

Tim Maudlin is married to Vishnya Maudlin; they have two children.

== Philosophical work ==
In his first book, Quantum Non-Locality and Relativity (1994), Maudlin explains Bell's Theorem and the tension between violations of Bell's inequality and relativity.

In Truth and Paradox: Solving the Riddles (2004), Maudlin presents a new resolution to the "Liar Paradox" (for example, the sentence "This sentence is false") and other semantic paradoxes that requires a modification of classical logic.

In The Metaphysics Within Physics (2007) the central idea is that "metaphysics, in so far as it is concerned with the natural world, can do no better than to reflect on physics".

Metaphysics is ontology. Ontology is the most generic study of what exists. Evidence for what exists, at least in the physical world, is provided solely by empirical research. Hence the proper object of most metaphysics is the careful analysis of our best scientific theories (and especially of fundamental physical theories) with the goal of determining what they imply about the constitution of the physical world.

Maudlin delves into fundamental topics of cosmology, arguing that laws of nature ought to be taken as primitive, not reduced to something else, and that the passage and direction of time are fundamental. On this theory, the arrow of time has a single direction and time is asymmetric, contradicting the quantum-mechanical idea of time's symmetry and other theories that deny the existence of time, as championed by physicist Julian Barbour.

I believe that it is a fundamental, irreducible fact about the spatio-temporal structure of the world that time passes. [...] The passage of time is an intrinsic asymmetry in the temporal structure of the world, an asymmetry that has no spatial counterpart.[...] Still, going from Mars to Earth is not the same as going from Earth to Mars. The difference, if you will, is how these sequences of states are oriented with respect to the passage of time. [...] The belief that time passes, in this sense, has no bearing on the question of the 'reality' of the past or of the future. I believe that the past is real: there are facts about what happened in the past that are independent of the present state of the world and independent of all knowledge or beliefs about the past. I similarly believe that there is (i.e. will be) a single unique future. I know what it would be to believe that the past is unreal (i.e. nothing ever happened, everything was just created ex nihilo) and to believe that the future is unreal (i.e. all will end, I will not exist tomorrow, I have no future). I do not believe these things, and would act very differently if I did. Insofar as belief in the reality of the past and the future constitutes a belief in a 'block universe', I believe in a block universe. But I also believe that time passes, and see no contradiction or tension between these views.

Maudlin defends his view over rival proposals by David Lewis and Bas Van Fraassen, among others. Lewis analyzed natural laws as those generalizations that figure in all theoretical systematizations of empirical truths that best combine strength and simplicity. Maudlin objects that this analysis rides roughshod over the intuition that some such generalizations could fail to be laws in worlds that we should follow scientists in deeming physically possible. Van Fraassen argued that laws of nature are of no philosophical significance, and may be eliminated in favor of models in a satisfactory analysis of science. Maudlin counters that this deprives one of the resources to say how cutting down its class of models can enhance a theory's explanatory power, a phenomenon readily accounted for when one takes a theory's model class as well as its explanatory power to derive from its constituent laws (Richard Healey, University of Arizona).

In Philosophy of Physics: Space and Time (2012) Maudlin explains the philosophical issues of relativity to a lay audience, though some of his arguments, like his divorcing of the resolution of the twin paradox from the presence of acceleration for the travelling twin, have been criticised in the literature. In New Foundations for Physical Geometry (2014) he proposes a new mathematics of physical space called the theory of linear structures. Maudlin's subject is specifically empirical spacetime, which he believes a kind of linearization describes better than abstract topological open sets.

== Bibliography ==
=== Books ===
- Quantum Non-Locality and Relativity: Metaphysical Intimations of Modern Physics. Oxford: Basil Blackwell, 1994; Second Edition, 2002; Third Edition, 2011
- Truth and Paradox: Solving the Riddles. Oxford University Press, 2004
- The Metaphysics Within Physics. Oxford University Press, 2007
- Philosophy of Physics, Volume 1: "Space and Time". Princeton University Press, 2012
- New Foundations for Physical Geometry. Oxford University Press, 2014
- Philosophy of Physics, Volume 2: "Quantum Theory". Princeton University Press, 2019

=== Papers and book chapters ===
- “Three Roads to Objective Probability”, in Probabilities in Physics, edited by Claus Beisbart and Stephan Hartmann, Oxford University Press, pp. 293–322 (2011)
- Preface to Quantum Physics Without Quantum Philosophy by Detfel Dürr, Sheldon Golstein and Nino Zanghi, forthcoming from Springer Verlag
- “The Nature of the Quantum State”, forthcoming in The Wavefunction, edited by Alyssa Ney and David Albert, Oxford University Press
- “On the Albertian Demon”, forthcoming in a book commenting on David Albert’s Time and Chance, edited by Barry Loewer, Brad Weslake and Eric Winsberg, Harvard University Press
- “Time and the Geometry of the Universe”, in The Future of the Philosophy of Time, edited by Adrian Bardon, Routledge, pp. 188–216 (2012)
- Interview in Philosophy of Physics: 5 +1 Questions, edited by Juan Ferret and John Symons, Automatic Press, pp. 105–111
- “The Geometry of Space-Time”, The Aristotelian Society, Supplementary volume LXXXIV, pp. 63–78 (2010)
- “Can the World Be Only Wavefunction?” in Many Worlds?, edited by Jonathan Barrett, Adrian Kent, Simon Saunders and David Wallace, Oxford University Press 2010, pp. 121–143
- “What Bell Proved: A Reply to Blaylock”, American Journal of Physics 78, vol.1, 121-125 (January 2010)
- “Space, Absolute and Relational”, Routledge Companion to Metaphysics, edited by Robin LePoidevin, Routledge: London, 2009, pp. 420–429
- “Grading, Sorting and the Sorites”, Midwest Studies in Philosophy, Volume XXXII (“Truth and Its Deformities”) 2008, pp. 141–168
- “Reducing Revenge to Discomfort” in Revenge of the Liar, edited by J. C. Beall, Oxford: Oxford University Press, 2007, pp. 184–196
- “Completeness, Supervenience and Ontology” in The Quantum Universe, a special edition of Journal of Physics A: Mathematical and General, Phys. A: Math. Theor. 40 (2007) 3151-3171
- “What Could Be Objective About Probabilities?”, Studies in History and Philosophy of Modern Physics 38, 275-91, (June 2007)
- “Non-Local Correlations” in Quantum Theory: Some Ways the Trick Might be Done, Einstein, Relativity, and Absolute Simultaneity, ed. Quentin Smith and William Lane Craig, Routledge (2007) pp. 186–209
- “The Message of the Quantum?”, with M. Daumer, D. Dürr, S. Goldstein, R. Tumulka, and N. Zanghì, in Quantum Mechanics: Are there Quantum Jumps? and On the Present Status of Quantum Mechanics, edited by A. Bassi, D. Dürr, T. Weber and N. Zanghì, AIP Conference Proceedings 844, 129-132 (American Institute of Physics, 2006), quant-ph/0604173
- Abstract of Truth and Paradox with replies to comments by Hartry Field, Anil Gupta, and Nuel Belnap, Philosophy and Phenomenological Research November 2006, 696-704 and 728-739
- “Time Travel and Modern Physics” (With Frank Arntzenius), Stanford Encyclopedia of Philosophy, republished in Time, Reality and Experience, edited by C. Callender, Cambridge University Press, 2002
- "Computation and Consciousness", Journal of Philosophy 86, 1989, pp. 407–432
