= 2020 North Carolina Courage season =

North Carolina Courage
2020 season
- Owner: Stephen Malik
- General Manager: Curt Johnson
- Head Coach: Paul Riley
- Stadium: Sahlen's Stadium at WakeMed Soccer Park; Cary, North Carolina (Capacity: 10,000)
- NWSL Challenge Cup: Quarterfinals
- Community Shield: 5th place
- Top goalscorer: League: N/A; All: Lynn Williams (6)
- Biggest win: 2–0 (July 4th vs. Washington); 2–0 (July 8th vs. Sky Blue)
- Biggest defeat: 1–4 (October 4th vs. Houston)
Home colors	Away colors

The 2020 North Carolina Courage season was the team's fourth season as a professional women's soccer team. North Carolina Courage plays in the National Women's Soccer League, the top tier of women's soccer in the United States.

== Team ==
=== Coaching staff ===
As of October 1, 2020
Source: North Carolina Courage

Position	Staff
Head coach	(England) Paul Riley
Assistant coach	(United States) Scott Vallow
Assistant coach	(United States) Bill Paladino
Assistant coach	(United States) Sean Nahas
Assistant coach	(England) Nathan Thackeray

=== First-team roster ===
As of September 30, 2020

Note: Flags indicate national team as defined under FIFA eligibility rules; some limited exceptions apply. Players may hold more than one non-FIFA nationality.

No.	Pos.	Nation	Player
1	GK	CAN	Stephanie Labbé
3	DF	USA	Kaleigh Kurtz
4	FW	USA	McKenzie Meehan
5	MF	USA	Sam Mewis
6	DF	NZL	Abby Erceg *
8	MF	IRL	Denise O'Sullivan (loaned out)
9	FW	USA	Lynn Williams
10	MF	BRA	Debinha
11	DF	USA	Merritt Mathias
13	DF	USA	Abby Dahlkemper
14	FW	USA	Jessica McDonald *
15	DF	USA	Jaelene Daniels *
19	FW	USA	Crystal Dunn *
20	MF	USA	Ryan Williams
21	DF	USA	Cari Roccaro
23	FW	USA	Kristen Hamilton *
25	DF	USA	Meredith Speck

No.	Pos.	Nation	Player
26	DF	USA	Hailey Harbison
27	MF	USA	Lauren Milliet
37	GK	USA	Samantha Murphy
99	GK	USA	Katelyn Rowland
—	DF	CAN	Lindsay Agnew (loaned out)
—	DF	USA	Hailie Mace (loaned out)
—	DF	USA	Addisyn Merrick
—	DF	USA	Sinclaire Miramontez
—	FW	USA	Ally Watt
—	FW	USA	Rylee Baisden
—	FW	USA	Danica Evans
—	FW	ALB	Kristina Maksuti
—	MF	USA	Peyton Perea
—	DF	MEX	Arianna Romero
—	FW	JAM	Havana Solaun

- Player opted not to participate in the 2020 NWSL Fall Series.

== Player transactions ==
=== 2020 NWSL College Draft ===
Source: National Women's Soccer League

Round	Pick	Nat.	Player	Previous Team
Round 1	6	(United States)	Ally Watt	Texas A&M
Round 3	27	(United States)	Sinclaire Miramontez	University of Nebraska
Round 4	28	(United States)	Addisyn Merrick	University of Kansas
Round 4	36	(United States)	Bri Folds	Auburn

=== Players in ===
Date	Player	Positions played	Previous club	Fee/notes	Ref.
June 19, 2020	(Canada) Lindsay Agnew	DF	(United States) Houston Dash	Signed a one-year contract with one-year option.	
August 31, 2020	(United States) Peyton Perea	MF	(Spain) Santa Teresa CD	Signed through the 2020 season.	
September 3, 2020	(United States) Rylee Baisden	FW	(Australia) Brisbane Roar FC	Signed through the 2020 season.	
September 3, 2020	(United States) Danica Evans	FW	(Spain) Sporting de Huelva	Signed through the 2020 season.	
September 8, 2020	(Albania) Kristina Maksuti	FW	(Germany) MSV Duisburg	Signed through the 2020 season.	
September 9, 2020	(Mexico) Arianna Romero	DF	(United States) Houston Dash	Signed through the 2020 season.	
September 30, 2020	(Jamaica) Havana Solaun	FW	(Norway) Klepp IL	Signed through the 2020 season.	
October 22, 2020	(United States) Casey Murphy	GK	(United States) OL Reign	Acquired with $140,000 in allocation money in a trade for Crystal Dunn.	
December 7, 2020	(United States) Taylor Smith	DF	(United States) OL Reign	Acquired with the NWSL rights to Jodie Taylor in a trade for Ally Watt.	
December 7, 2020	(England) Jodie Taylor (NWSL rights)	FW	(United States) OL Reign	Acquired with Taylor Smith in a trade for Ally Watt.	

=== Players out ===
Date	Player	Positions played	Destination club	Fee/notes	Ref.
August 4, 2020	(Canada) Lindsay Agnew	DF	(Sweden) KIF Örebro DFF	Loaned.	
August 10, 2020	(United States) Samantha Mewis	MF	(England) Manchester City W.F.C.	Signed; North Carolina retained NWSL rights.	
August 14, 2020	(United States) Hailie Mace	DF	(Sweden) Kristianstads DFF	Loaned.	
September 9, 2020	(Republic of Ireland) Denise O'Sullivan	DF	(England) Brighton & Hove Albion W.F.C.	Loaned until December 31, 2020.	
October 22, 2020	(United States) Crystal Dunn	MF	(United States) OL Reign	Traded for Casey Murphy and $140,000 in allocation money.	
October 30, 2020	(United States) Rylee Baisden	FW	Unattached.	Contract terminated.	
October 30, 2020	(United States) Danica Evans	FW	Unattached.	Contract terminated.	
October 30, 2020	(Albania) Kristina Maksuti	FW	Unattached.	Contract terminated.	
October 30, 2020	(United States) Peyton Perea	MF	Unattached.	Contract terminated.	
October 30, 2020	(Mexico) Arianna Romero	DF	Unattached.	Contract terminated.	
November 4, 2020	(United States) Jaelene Daniels	DF	Unattached; North Carolina retained NWSL rights.	Retired.	
November 12, 2020	(United States) Addisyn Merrick	DF	(United States) Racing Louisville FC	Selected in the 2020 NWSL Expansion Draft.	
November 12, 2020	(United States) Lauren Milliet	MF	(United States) Racing Louisville FC	Selected in the 2020 NWSL Expansion Draft.	
December 7, 2020	(United States) Ally Watt	DF	(United States) OL Reign	Traded for Taylor Smith and the NWSL rights to Jodie Taylor.	

== Competitions ==
=== National Women's Soccer League ===
==== Preseason ====
Source: North Carolina Courage

On March 12, 2020, the preseason match schedule was cancelled due to the COVID-19 pandemic.

March 21	North Carolina Courage	v	University of North Carolina	Cary, North Carolina
2:00 p.m. ET		Cancelled		Stadium: Sahlen's Stadium at WakeMed Soccer Park

March 28	North Carolina Courage	v	West Virginia University	Cary, North Carolina
2:00 p.m. ET		Cancelled		Stadium: Sahlen's Stadium at WakeMed Soccer Park

March 29	North Carolina Courage	v	University of South Carolina	Cary, North Carolina
2:00 p.m. ET		Cancelled		Stadium: Sahlen's Stadium at WakeMed Soccer Park

April 02	North Carolina Courage	v	Duke University	Cary, North Carolina
5:00 p.m. ET		Cancelled		Stadium: Sahlen's Stadium at WakeMed Soccer Park

April 05	North Carolina Courage	v	Sky Blue FC	Cary, North Carolina
1:00 p.m. ET		Cancelled		Stadium: Sahlen's Stadium at WakeMed Soccer Park

April 10	North Carolina Courage	v	East Carolina University	Cary, North Carolina
12:00 p.m. ET		Cancelled		Stadium: Sahlen's Stadium at WakeMed Soccer Park

==== Regular season ====
On May 27, 2020, the NWSL announced that the 2020 NWSL regular season and playoffs were canceled due to the pandemic, and that the 2020 NWSL Challenge Cup would mark the league's return to action.

==== Challenge Cup ====
===== Preliminary round =====
June 27, 2020	North Carolina Courage	2–1	Portland Thorns FC	Herriman, Utah
10:30 a.m. MDT	Debinha 75'; L. Williams 90+4'	Report	Charley 80'	Stadium: Zions Bank Stadium; Referee: Lukasz Szpala

July 1, 2020	Washington Spirit	0–2	North Carolina Courage	Herriman, Utah
8:00 p.m. MDT		Report	L. Williams 50', 61'	Stadium: Zions Bank Stadium; Referee: Lukasz Szpala

July 5, 2020	North Carolina Courage	1–0	Chicago Red Stars	Herriman, Utah
10:30 a.m. MDT	Erceg 81'	Report		Stadium: Zions Bank Stadium; Referee: Tori Penso

July 13, 2020	Sky Blue FC	0–2	North Carolina Courage	Herriman, Utah
8:00 p.m. MDT		Report	Mewis 7'; Dunn 56'	Stadium: Zions Bank Stadium; Referee: Lukasz Szpala

Pos	Team	Pld	W	D	L	GF	GA	GD	Pts
1	North Carolina Courage	4	4	0	0	7	1	+6	12
2	Washington Spirit	4	2	1	1	4	4	0	7
3	OL Reign	4	1	2	1	1	2	−1	5
4	Houston Dash	4	1	1	2	5	6	−1	4
5	Utah Royals FC (H)	4	1	1	2	4	5	−1	4
6	Chicago Red Stars	4	1	1	2	2	3	−1	4 (Note: Chicago Red Stars won the tiebreaker against Sky Blue FC on fewer yellow cards (1 to 4).)
7	Sky Blue FC	4	1	1	2	2	3	−1	4
8	Portland Thorns FC	4	0	3	1	2	3	−1	3

Source: NWSL
Rules for classification: Tiebreakers
(H) Host

===== Quarter-finals =====
July 17, 2020	North Carolina Courage	0–1	Portland Thorns FC	Herriman, Utah
10:30 a.m. MDT		Report	Weaver 68'	Stadium: Zions Bank Stadium; Referee: Lukasz Szpala

==== Fall Series ====
The Courage competed in the South "pod" of the NWSL Fall Series tournament, with the Houston Dash and Orlando Pride.

September 12 1	North Carolina Courage	4–3	Houston Dash	Cary, North Carolina
	Dahlkemper 18'; Debinha 52' (L. Williams), 86' (Speck); L. Williams 83' (Baisden)	Report	Latsko 25' (Groom); K. Mewis 37' (Groom); Chapman (yellow card) 18' (yellow-red card) 53'; Schmidt 70' (Stengel)	Stadium: Sahlen's Stadium at WakeMed Soccer Park

September 19 2	North Carolina Courage	0–0	Orlando Pride	Cary, North Carolina
	Roccaro (yellow card) 10'	Report	Listro (yellow card) 35'	Stadium: Sahlen's Stadium at WakeMed Soccer Park

October 04 3	Houston Dash	4–1	North Carolina Courage	Houston, Texas
	Schmidt 30' (K. Mewis); Latsko 30' (K. Mewis); K. Mewis 30' (Latsko); Groom (yellow card) 70' (goal) 83' (K. Mewis)	Report	L. Williams 74' (R. Williams)	Stadium: BBVA Stadium

October 17 4	Orlando Pride	3–3	North Carolina Courage	Orlando, Florida
	Krieger (yellow card) 15'; Viggiano 54'; Edmonds 77' (Lawrence); Haran 90+2' (Marta); Listro (yellow card) 85'	Report	Debinha 19' (Milliet), 45+6' (Speck); L. Williams 45+5' (Debinha)	Stadium: Exploria Stadium

Pos	Team	Pld	W	D	L	GF	GA	GD	Pts	Qualification
1	Portland Thorns FC (C)	4	3	1	0	10	3	+7	10	Community Shield
2	Houston Dash	4	3	0	1	12	7	+5	9	Runners-up
3	Washington Spirit	4	2	1	1	5	4	+1	7	Third place
4	Sky Blue FC	4	2	0	2	6	7	−1	6	
5	North Carolina Courage	4	1	2	1	8	10	−2	5	
6	Chicago Red Stars	4	1	1	2	7	7	0	4	
7	OL Reign	4	1	1	2	6	8	−2	4	
8	Orlando Pride	4	0	2	2	5	8	−3	2	
9	Utah Royals FC	4	0	2	2	3	8	−5	2	

Source: NWSL
Rules for classification: Tiebreakers
(C) Champions
