= A Troubled Peace =

2009 novel by L.M. Elliott

- First edition
- Author: L.M. Elliott
- Language: English
- Genre: Young adult, War novel
- Publisher: HarperCollins
- Publication date: August 2009
- Publication place: United States
- Media type: Print (hardback & paperback)
- Pages: 289 pp (first edition, hardback)
- ISBN: 978-0-06-074427-4 (first edition, hardback)
- OCLC: 310398936
- Preceded by: Under a War-Torn Sky

A Troubled Peace is the 2009 sequel to the historical fiction novel Under a War-Torn Sky, written by Virginia author L.M. Elliott.

== Summary ==
World War II may be ending, but for 19-year-old bomber pilot Henry Forester, the conflict still rages on. Shot down over France, Henry endured a dangerous trek to freedom, relying on civilians and French Resistance fighters to stay alive. But back home in Virginia, Henry is still reliving air battles with Hitler's Luftwaffe and his torture by the Gestapo. Henry worries about the safety of those who helped him escape—especially the young French boy, Pierre, who may have lost everything in his efforts to save Henry.

When Henry returns to France to find Pierre, he is stunned by the brutal aftermath of combat: widespread starvation, cities shattered by Allied bombing, and the return of survivors from the Nazi concentration camps. His efforts to find and secure the safety of Pierre help him to resolve the deep inner conflict he experiences at the beginning of the novel.

== Relevance to other works by L.M. Elliott ==
Elliott is the author of novels for young adults, including Annie, Between the States, a Civil War story which tracks how the upheaval of that conflict changes the life of the young heroine. Another work, Give Me Liberty, recreates the rise of revolutionary fever in 1776 through the eyes of a young indentured servant who participates in one of the first battles of the war.

Under a War-Torn Sky, the author's first novel of the two, tells the story of Henry Forester, a young pilot flying bombing missions in World War II. In the novel, Henry is trapped behind enemy lines; with the aid of resistance fighters (the Maquis) as well as a host of brave French citizens, he is eventually reunited with Allied forces. Elliott drew inspiration for the novel from the experiences of her own father, who served as a bomber pilot in World War II and had to rely on the courage of everyday French people to reach freedom.

This novel and the sequel, A Troubled Peace, are works of historical fiction. The characters, dialog, and plot twists created by the author are crafted as believable, authentic representations. The author's first-hand research, including travel to sites in France described in the books, allows for specific references to actual geography and historical events; extensive secondary research (using rare print sources as well as actual artifacts) provides a level of historical detail that is not common in the genre. The author creates added texture with references to literature and music popular in the times described. (British novelist and critic George Orwell appears in one scene of the novel, and the work of Albert Camus is referred to.)

The author's works are noted for creating believable "coming of age" novels which make extensive use of the conflicts experienced by military personnel as well as civilians who have been swept up into war. Books by the author appear in school curricula throughout the United States and are popular on summer reading lists.
