= Mary L. McMaster =

American oncologist and clinical trialist

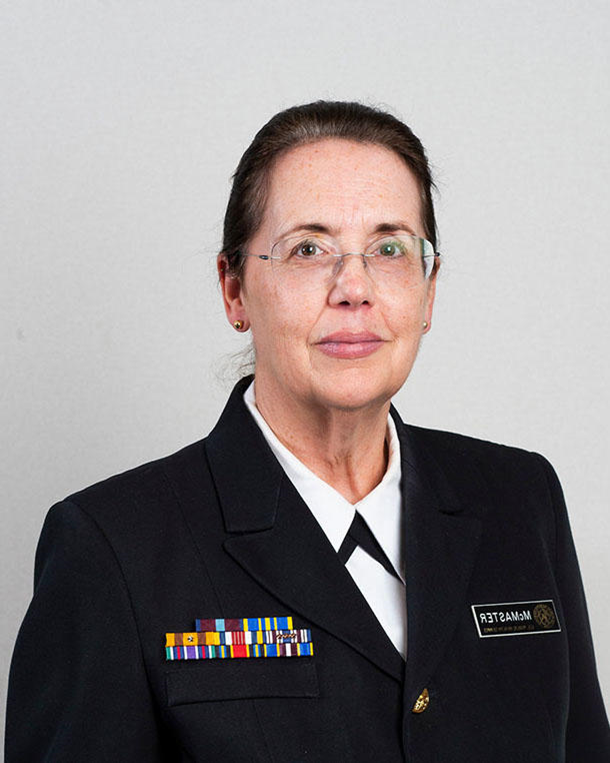
- Education: Wake Forest School of Medicine
- Scientific career
- Fields: Cancer genetics, oncology, clinical trials
- Workplaces: National Cancer Institute

Mary Lou McMaster is an American oncologist and clinical trialist who researches familial cancer genetics. She is a senior clinical trial specialist at the National Cancer Institute and a captain in the United States Public Health Service Commissioned Corps.

== Life ==
McMaster received her M.D. from the Wake Forest School of Medicine. She completed residency training in internal medicine and a fellowship in medical oncology at Vanderbilt University. Following a postdoctoral fellowship in cellular biology at the UNC Lineberger Comprehensive Cancer Center, she came to the National Institutes of Health (NIH), where she completed training in clinical medical genetics.

McMaster joined the National Cancer Institute (NCI) as a clinical research fellow in the then-genetic epidemiology branch in the division of cancer epidemiology and genetics. She researched cancer genetics with an emphasis on familial cancer syndromes. McMaster was promoted to staff clinician in 2002, and transferred to the clinical genetics branch (CGB) in 2016. She is a commissioned officer in the United States Public Health Service Commissioned Corps and was promoted to captain in 2012. McMaster is a senior clinical trial specialist. She researches Waldenström macroglobulinemia, lymphoproliferative disorders, testicular cancer, and DICER1 syndrome. McMaster presents at International Waldenstrom's Macroglobulinemia Foundation meetings.

== See also ==
- List of Wake Forest University people
