= Wildwood Catholic Academy =

Catholic high school in Cape May County, New Jersey, United States

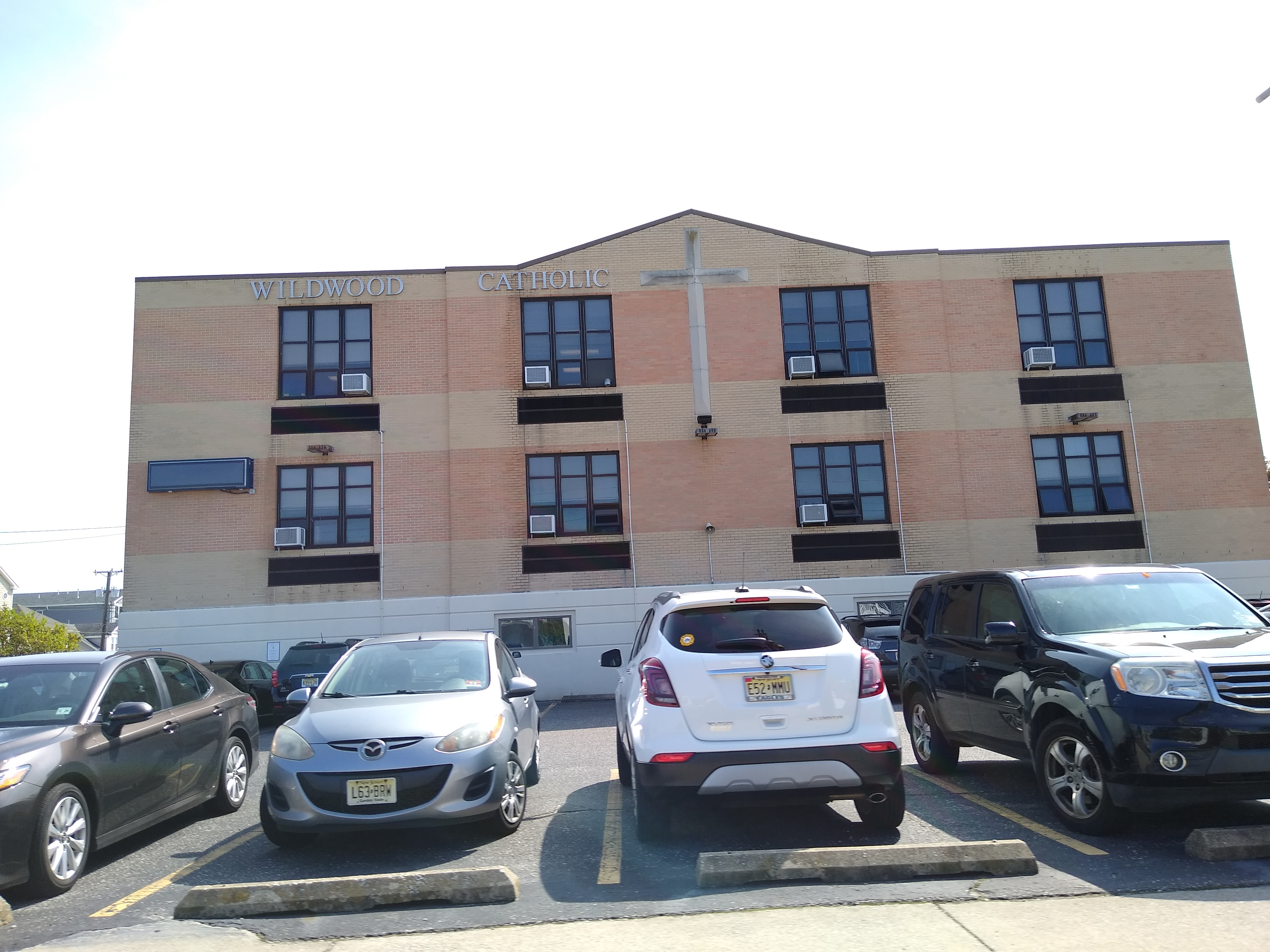
- Wildwood Catholic Academy in North Wildwood, New Jersey

Location
- 1500 Central Avenue; North Wildwood, (Cape May County), New Jersey 08260; United States; 38°59′57″N 74°48′8″W

Information
- Type: Private, Coeducational
- Motto: Fides et Scientia (Faith and Knowledge)
- Religious affiliation: Roman Catholic
- Established: 1948 (as Wildwood Catholic High School)
- Founder: Bishop Bartholomew J. Eustace
- Oversight: Diocese of Camden
- NCES School ID: 00865111
- Rector: Father Cadmus D. Mazzarella
- Principal: Joseph Cray
- Faculty: 29.1 FTEs
- Grades: PreK–12
- Student to teacher ratio: 11.4:1
- Colors: Royal blue and white
- Athletics conference: Cape-Atlantic League
- Mascot: Crusader
- Nickname: Catholic
- Team name: Crusaders
- Rivals: Wildwood High School; Cape May County Technical High School
- Accreditation: Middle States Association of Colleges and Schools
- Newspaper: The Crusader
- Yearbook: ANNSCRIPT
- Tuition: $9,650 (first child in 9-12)
- Affiliation: Cape Trinity Catholic (merged into Wildwood Catholic in 2020)
- Website: www.wildwoodcatholicacademy.org

Wildwood Catholic Academy (WCA), formerly Wildwood Catholic High School, is a co-educational pre-kindergarten to twelfth grade Catholic school in North Wildwood, in Cape May County, New Jersey. The school operates under the auspices of the Roman Catholic Diocese of Camden. The school opened in September 1948 with an initial enrollment of 80 students. Wildwood Catholic High School has been accredited by the Middle States Association of Colleges and Schools Commission on Elementary and Secondary Schools since 1956.

As of the 2023–24 school year, the school had an enrollment of 333 students (plus 32 in PreK) and 29.1 classroom teachers (on an FTE basis), for a student–teacher ratio of 11.4:1.

The school houses the offices of the Notre Dame de la Mer Catholic Parish, which controls the two Catholic churches in the Wildwoods.

== History ==
Wildwood Catholic High School was established in 1948. In July 1948, Bishop Bartholomew J. Eustace presided over the dedication of a cornerstone for what was to be called St. Ann's High School, which was to be constructed at a cost of $650,000 (equivalent to $8.7 million in 2025).

The diocese announced in January 2010 that Wildwood Catholic High School would close down after the 2009–10 school year, however, after fundraising efforts, the school raised enough money to remain open. The school building was to be used for a new elementary school, Cape Trinity Catholic, which was created as a merger of St. Ann Regional School in Wildwood and Star of the Sea Regional in Cape May so the school was now shared. Star of the Sea had absorbed St. Raymond in Villas three years prior.

On April 17, 2020, the Diocese of Camden announced that Wildwood Catholic was one of five New Jersey Catholic schools which would permanently close. Data from the Diocese showed that the two schools had 382 students in 2015, which had dropped to 337 by 2020, a 12% decline; the high school had received $750,000 in financial support from the Diocese during that five-year period. After a $1 million fundraising campaign, the school was once again saved after merging with Cape Trinity Catholic School, which had also been scheduled to close, to form Wildwood Catholic Academy for grades K-12.

== Athletics ==
The Wildwood Catholic High School Crusaders compete in the National Division of the Cape-Atlantic League, which comprises public and private high schools in Atlantic County, Cape May County, Cumberland County, and Gloucester County, New Jersey and operates under the supervision of the New Jersey State Interscholastic Athletic Association (NJSIAA). With 118 students in grades 10–12, the school was classified by the NJSIAA for the 2019–20 school year as Non-Public B for most athletic competition purposes, which included schools with an enrollment of 37 to 366 students in that grade range (equivalent to Group I for public schools).

The boys' basketball team won the Non-Public Group C state championship in 1958 (defeating St. Cecilia High School of Kearny in the tournament final) and 1960 (vs. St. Anthony High School of Jersey City). The team had a school record-breaking season in 2019, recording a 27–2 record that included a 22-game undefeated streak and a program record for wins. The team's season ended in the Non-Public B South finals, in which the team lost in overtime to a Ranney School squad that went on to win the Tournament of Champions. The squad was recognized as Team of the Year by The Philadelphia Inquirer and the Courier-Post.

The boys' swimming team won the Division B state championship in 1998–2001.

The boys' soccer team won the 1998 Parochial B state title with a 2–1 win over Eastern Christian High School in a game played at The College of New Jersey, marking the program's first state championship. The winning goal was scored by senior Pat Mitchell.

The boys' cross country team was the state champion in 1998. Micheal Delaney won the state individual championship that same year.

The boys' soccer team won the 2006 South B state sectional championship with a 1–0 win over St. Rose High School in the tournament final.

The girls' cross country team won the Non-Public Group B state championship in 2006.

== Notable alumni ==
- Justin Catanoso (born 1959), journalist and author of My Cousin The Saint, A Search for Faith, Family, and Miracles
- Joe Maloy (born 1985), triathlete who was chosen to represent the United States at the 2016 Summer Olympics
