= Elliot Vesell =

American pharmacologist (1933–2018)

Elliot Saul Vesell (December 24, 1933 – July 23, 2018) was an American pharmacologist.

A New York City native born on December 24, 1933, Vesell attended Horace Mann School and Philips Exeter Academy before enrolling at Harvard University, where he studied American literature and history. Vesell then earned a medical degree from Harvard Medical School and completed postdoctoral research at Rockefeller University. After a stint at Peter Bent Brigham Hospital, Vesell worked for the National Institutes of Health. George T. Harrell invited Vesell to join the faculty of Pennsylvania State University in 1968 as founding chair of the Department of Pharmacology. He was appointed to the Bernard B. Brodie Professorship, followed by PSU most prestigious title, the Evan Pugh Professorship, in 1981. In 1990, he was made a fellow of the American Association for the Advancement of Science. Vesell stepped down as pharmacology department chair in 2004, and was succeeded by Kent Vrana in an endowment named for Vesell. Vesell retired from Penn State in December 2008, and died on July 23, 2018, aged 84.
