= African International Documentary Festival Foundation =

Nigerian not-for-profit organisation

- Abbreviation: AFIDFF
- Formation: 2018
- Founder: Malame Manghza
- Type: Nonprofit
- Headquarters: Nigeria
- Region served: Africa (Nigeria, Cameroon, Zambia, Kenya)
- Website: https://afidff.org

The African International Documentary Festival Foundation (AFIDFF) is a not-for-profit organisation dedicated to promoting and supporting the art of documentary filmmaking and storytelling across the African continent. It was established in 2018 in Nigeria. In addition to its annual festival and training programmes, AFIDFF promotes tourism sites and runs a heritage sites documentation initiative, working with communities to record and promote and restore cultural landscapes such as the Sukur Cultural Landscape and the Gashaka Gumti National Park in Adamawa.

== History ==
AFIDFF was founded in 2018 by Malame Mangzha and Janice Marie Collins, PhD, in response to a recognised need for a dedicated platform for under-represented African documentary producers.
