= Wendy Young =

Medicinal chemist

Wendy B. Young, Ph.D.
- Citizenship: USA
- Education: Wake Forest University (B.S., M.S.); Princeton University (Ph.D.)
- Scientific career
- Doctoral advisor: Edward C. Taylor

Wendy B. Young is an advisor at Google Ventures and a former senior vice president of small molecule drug discovery at Genentech.

== Education ==
Young received her B.S. and M.S. from Wake Forest University, working with Prof. Huw Davies. She was co-author on an early application of Davies' rhodium(II) carbenoid insertion - Cope rearrangement chemistry, leading to the total synthesis of three small tropane natural products. Young received her Ph.D. from Princeton in 1993, working with Edward C. Taylor on heterocycles derived from natural pigments, one of which ultimately became pemetrexed (Alimta), an oncology treatment. In her postdoctoral fellowship with Samuel Danishefsky, Young was among one of a handful of groups in the mid-1990s to synthesize paclitaxel (Taxol), a highly-oxygenated terpenoid natural product used to treat cancer.

== Career ==
Despite multiple employment offers on the East Coast of the United States, Young chose to remain in the San Francisco Bay Area for her professional career. From 1995 to 2006, Young worked at Celera Genomics, studying inhibitor compounds of human plasma proteins such as kallikrein and Factors VIIa and IXa. She was recruited to Genentech in 2006, and in 2018 was promoted to Senior Vice President of Small Molecule drug discovery. One of her major research successes was development of a chemistry campaign against Bruton's tyrosine kinase, leading to molecules to potentially treat rheumatoid arthritis and B-cell lymphomas. Her team developed fenebrutinib, currently in Phase II clinical trials for several autoimmune disorders. In 2023, she became an advisor at Google Ventures.

== Awards ==
- 2020 - ACS Earle B. Barnes Award in Chemical Management
- 2020 - Wake Forest Distinguished Alumni Award
- 2018 - ACS Fellow
- 2018 - William S. Johnson Symposium, Stanford University
- 2017 - Elected Chair of ACS Medicinal Chemistry Division
- 2015 - "Most Influential Woman of 2015" - San Francisco Business Times
- 1995 - American Cancer Society Postdoctoral Fellowship
- 1993 - H.W. Dodds Top Thesis Award, Princeton University
