= Janice Marie Collins =

American journalist, filmmaker, and academic

- Born: Oklahoma, U.S.
- Education: Wake Forest University (BA); Ohio University (MS, PhD)
- Occupations: Journalist, documentary filmmaker, academic
- Known for: Documentary film A Taste of Gullah; co-founder of the African International Documentary Festival Foundation
- Website: janicemcollinsphd.com

Janice Marie Collins is an American journalist, documentary filmmaker, and academic. She co-founded the African International Documentary Festival Foundation (AFIDFF) and served as its president from 2018 to 2020. Her documentary work, including the Emmy Award-winning A Taste of Gullah, has been recognized with multiple awards from organizations such as the National Academy of Television Arts and Sciences, the Associated Press, and the National Association of Black Journalists.

== Early life and education ==
Collins was born in Oklahoma to a U.S. Army family and lived in Germany, Kentucky, and Virginia during her childhood. She earned a Bachelor of Arts in Speech Communications and Theatre Arts from Wake Forest University in 1986, followed by a Master of Science in Journalism in 2005 and a Ph.D. in Mass Communications and Media Arts & Studies in 2009 from Ohio University's E. W. Scripps School of Journalism.

== Academic career ==
Since August 2023, Collins has been an associate professor at Ohio University's E.W. Scripps School of Journalism, teaching broadcast and digital storytelling, leadership development, and inclusive pedagogy. From 2013 to 2023, she was an assistant professor in the Department of Journalism at the University of Illinois Urbana-Champaign and an affiliate faculty member at its Center for African Studies.

== Media and documentary work ==
Collins has over 35 years of experience as a journalist, documentary filmmaker, producer, director, writer, cinematographer, and editor. Her work has earned Emmy Awards, as well as honors from the Associated Press, the National Association of Black Journalists, and the Association of Black Journalists.

Her documentary A Taste of Gullah won Best Documentary at the International Garifuna Film Festival in Venice, California and has been broadcast on PBS. In 2021, she produced Journey to My Mother's Land: Extending the Gates' Effect into Africa, a five-hour auto-ethnographic series documenting her ancestral journey to Sierra Leone. The series won a cinematography award at the 4th Dimension Independent Film Festival in Bali, Indonesia.

== African International Documentary Festival Foundation ==
In 2018, Collins co-founded the African International Documentary Festival Foundation with Malame Mangzha to promote under-represented documentary storytellers in Africa. As president from 2018 to 2020, she managed festival programming, training initiatives, and heritage-site documentation projects across several African countries.

== Selected awards ==
- Emmy Awards for news and documentary production
- Best Documentary, International Garifuna Film Festival (for A Taste of Gullah)
- Cinematography Award, 4th Dimension Independent Film Festival (2021, for Journey to My Mother's Land)
