= Clint McCown =

American author, poet, journalist, editor, actor, and university professor

- Born: 1952 (age 73–74); Fayetteville, Tennessee, U.S.

Academic background
- Education: Wake Forest University; Indiana University Bloomington
- Website: https://vcfa.edu/faculty-staff/clint-mccown/

Clint McCown (born 1952) is an American author, poet, journalist, editor, actor, and university professor. He teaches fiction writing and screenwriting in the Department of English at Virginia Commonwealth University and in the low-residency Master of Fine Arts (MFA) program for the Vermont College of Fine Arts.

== Early life and education ==
A native of Tennessee, McCown spent his youth in Birmingham, Alabama and in Gettysburg, Pennsylvania. He attended Gettysburg Area High School.

He received B.A. and M.A. degrees from Wake Forest University and an M.F.A. from Indiana University Bloomington. He received professional theatre training at the Circle in the Square Theatre School on Broadway in 1973-74.

== Career ==
McCown toured as a principal actor with the National Shakespeare Company and the Puerto Rican Traveling Theatre. From 1976-78 he worked as poet/dramatist-in-residence for the North Carolina Visiting Artist program.

In 1978-79 he worked as Capitol Reporter for the Alabama Information Network, a chain of sixty-seven affiliated radio stations in Alabama. For his investigations of organized crime and political corruption, he received an Associated Press Award for Documentary Excellence in 1978.

After a stint as editor of Indiana Review, he taught at Beloit College in Wisconsin, where he founded, and was first editor of, the Beloit Fiction Journal. He served four years as General Editor of the Intro Journals Project for the Association of Writers and Writing Programs.

He has taught in the MFA program at Virginia Commonwealth University since 2004, where he has served as program director; and in the low-residency MFA program at the Vermont College of Fine Arts since 2005.

== Awards ==
His work has received several awards, including the Midwest Book Award for Fiction from MIPA, the Sister Mariella Gable Prize, the Society of Midland Authors Award for Adult Fiction, an Academy of American Poets Prize, a National Endowment for the Arts grant, a Barnes & Noble Discover Great New Writers designation, and a Distinction in Literature Citation from the Wisconsin Library Association. He also received an Associated Press Award for Documentary Excellence for his investigations of organized crime and political corruption. In 2021 he was inducted into the Writers Hall of Fame at Wake Forest University.

In short fiction, he is the only two-time recipient of the American Fiction Prize from Birch Lane Press in 1991 for Home Course Advantage, selected by Louise Erdrich and in 1993 for Mule Collector, selected by Wallace Stegner.

== Books ==
- Labyrinthiad (poems, Bard Press, 1975)
- Sidetracks (poems, Jackpine Press 1977)
- Wind Over Water (poems, Northwoods Press, 1984)
- The Member-Guest (novel, cloth, Doubleday, 1995)
- War Memorials (novel, Graywolf Press, cloth, 2000; Houghton Mifflin, pbk., 2001
- The Weatherman (novel, Graywolf Press, cloth, 2004)
- Dead Languages (poems, Anhinga Press, 2008)
- Haints (novel, New Rivers Press, 2012)
- Total Balance Farm (poems, Press 53, 2017)
- The Dictionary of Unspellable Noises: New and Selected Poems, 1975-2018 (poems, Press 53, 2019)
- Music for Hard Times: Selected Stories (stories, Press 53, 2021)
- Mr. Potato Head vs. Freud: Lessons on the Craft of Writing Fiction (Press 53, 2021)
