= Kenneth M. Halanych =

Kenneth M. Halanych is a professor in zoology at the Auburn University, Alabama. He was born in Baltimore in 1966. He received his B.S. from Wake Forest University and his PhD in zoology in 1994, from University of Texas. He works on higher level systematics of invertebrates, mainly marine. According to the Web of Knowledge he has published 123 peer-reviewed scientific papers, 43 of them cited 10 or more times. The most widely referred to are:

- Halanych KM, Bacheller JD, Auginaldo AMA, Liva SM, Hillis DM, Lake JA. "Evidence from 18S ribosomal DNA that the Lophphorates are protostome animals "*Science 267(5204): 1641-1643 1995 Times Cited: 286
- Halanych KM. "The new view of animal phylogeny" Annual Review of Ecology and Systematics 35: 229-256 2004 Times Cited: 173
- Black MB, Halanych KM, Maas PAY, Hoeh WR, Hashimoto J, Desbruyeres D, Lutz RA, Vrijenhoek RC. "Molecular systematics of vestimentiferan tubeworms from hydrothermal vents and cold-water seep" Marine Biology 130(2): 141-149 1997 Times Cited: 85
- Halanych KM. "The Phylogenetic Position of the Pterobranch Hemichordates Based on 18S rDNA Sequence Data"Molecular Phylogenetics and Evolution 4(1): 72–76. Times Cited: 67
- Halanych KM. "Testing hypotheses of Chaetognath origins: Long branches revealed by 18S ribosomal DNA" Systematic Biology 45(2): 223-246 1996 Times Cited: 58
- Passamanek Y, Halanych KM "Lophotrochozoan phylogeny assessed with LSU and SSU data: Evidence of lophphorate polyphyly" "Molecular Phylogeneticsand Evolution" 40(1): 20–28. Times Cited: 57
- Shank TM, Black MB, Halanych KM, Lutz RA, Vrijenhoek RC "Miocene radiation of deep-sea hydrothermal vent shrimp (Caridea : Bresiliidae): Evidence from mitochondrial cytochrome oxidase subunit I "Molecular phylogenetics and Evolution" 13(2): 244-254 1999 Times Cited: 56
- Halanych KM, Robinson TJ "Multiple substitutions affect the phylogenetic utility of cytochrome b and 12S rDNA data: Examining a rapid radiation in Leporid (Lagomorpha) evolution" "Journal of Molecular Evolution" 48(3): 369–379. Times Cited: 54
- Halanych KM, Lutz RA, Vrijenhoek RC. "Evolutionary origins and age of vestimentiferan tube-worms" "Chaiers de Biologie Marine" 39(3–4): 355-358 1998 Times Cited: 54
- Struck TH, Schult N, Kusen T, Hickman E, Bleidorn C, McHugh D, Halanych KM "Annelid phylogeny and the status of Sipuncula and Echiura" "BMC Evolutionary Biology" 7(57)Times Cited 53
- Halanych KM, Demboski JR, van Vuuren BJ, Klein DR, Cook JA. "Cytochrome b phylogeny of North American hares and jackrabbits (Lepus, Lagomorpha) and the effects of saturation in outgroup taxa" Molecular phylogenetics and Evolution 11(2): 213-221 1999 Times Cited: 52

According to his web page, the goal of his research is to understand how extensive morphological variation came about by exploring questions on different time scales and with different type of information. He is combining a molecular systematic and/or genomic approach with information from organismal evolution, and has helped him to study everything from major animal lineages to the recent biogeographic history of commercially important species.

Dr. Halanych has also been a collaborator from Auburn University regarding the possible consequences of and solutions to the 2010 Gulf of Mexico Oil Spill
