= John Chandler (educator) =

American educator (1923–2022)

John Wesley Chandler (September 5, 1923 – August 5, 2022) was an American educator who was the 15th president of Hamilton College, from 1968 to 1973 and the 12th president of Williams College, from 1973 to 1985. He was also president of the Association of American Colleges and Universities from 1985 to 1990.

Chandler was born in Mars Hill, North Carolina, on September 5, 1923. He graduated from Wake Forest in 1945, and completed a doctorate in 1954 from Duke University. He taught at Wake Forest beginning in 1948, and moved to Williams in 1955. At Williams, he became the Cluett Professor of Religion in 1965. From 1968 until 1973, Chandler was President of Hamilton College in Clinton, NY. In 1973 he returned to Williams as President. He left Williams for the AACU in 1985; on his return to Williamstown in 2001, he became the Class of 1948 Distinguished Visiting Professor of Leadership Studies.

Chandler died on August 5, 2022, at the age of 98.
