= Mercedes Teixido =

American visual artist

Mercedes M. Teixido is an American visual artist. She is the Loren Barton Babcock Miller Fine Arts Professor at Pomona College in Claremont, California.
