= Janice B. Gardner =

American intelligence analyst

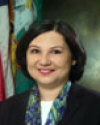

Assistant Secretary of the Treasury for Intelligence and Analysis
- In office September 2005 – 2009
- President: George W. Bush

Personal details
- Education: Wake Forest University (BA); American University (MA)

Janice B. Gardner is an American intelligence analyst. She served as the inaugural Assistant Secretary of the Treasury for Intelligence and Analysis during the George W. Bush administration, acting as Treasury's senior intelligence official.

== Early life and education ==
Gardner was born in Japan and grew up in Ohio. She holds a BA in history from Wake Forest University and an MA in international relations from American University.

== Career ==
From 1990 to 1992, Gardner was an economic officer at the US Embassy in Tokyo.

President George W. Bush nominated her to serve as Assistant Secretary of the Treasury for Intelligence and Analysis on May 13, 2005. She was confirmed by the U.S. Senate in July 2005.

Gardner was among a group of over 100 former Republican national security officials that endorsed Kamala Harris in the 2024 U.S. presidential election.
