= Journal of Family Issues =

- Discipline: Sociology
- Language: English
- Edited by: Constance L. Shehan

Publication details
- History: 1980–present
- Publisher: SAGE Publications
- Frequency: Monthly
- Impact factor: 1.489 (2017)

Standard abbreviations
- ISO 4: J. Fam. Issues

Indexing
- CODEN: JFISDT
- ISSN: 0192-513X (print); 1552-5481 (web)
- LCCN: 80643987
- OCLC no.: 5035642

Links
- Journal homepage; Online access; Online archive

Journal of Family Issues is a peer-reviewed academic journal that publishes papers in the field of family studies. The journal's editor-in-chief is Constance L. Shehan (University of Florida). It was established in 1980 and is currently published by SAGE Publications.

== Impact ==
According to the Journal Citation Reports, its 2018 impact factor is 1.607, ranking it 20 out of 46 journals in the category "Family Studies".

== Abstracting and indexing ==
Journal of Family Issues is abstracted and indexed in Scopus and the Social Sciences Citation Index.
