= Earl Smith (sociologist) =

American sociologist

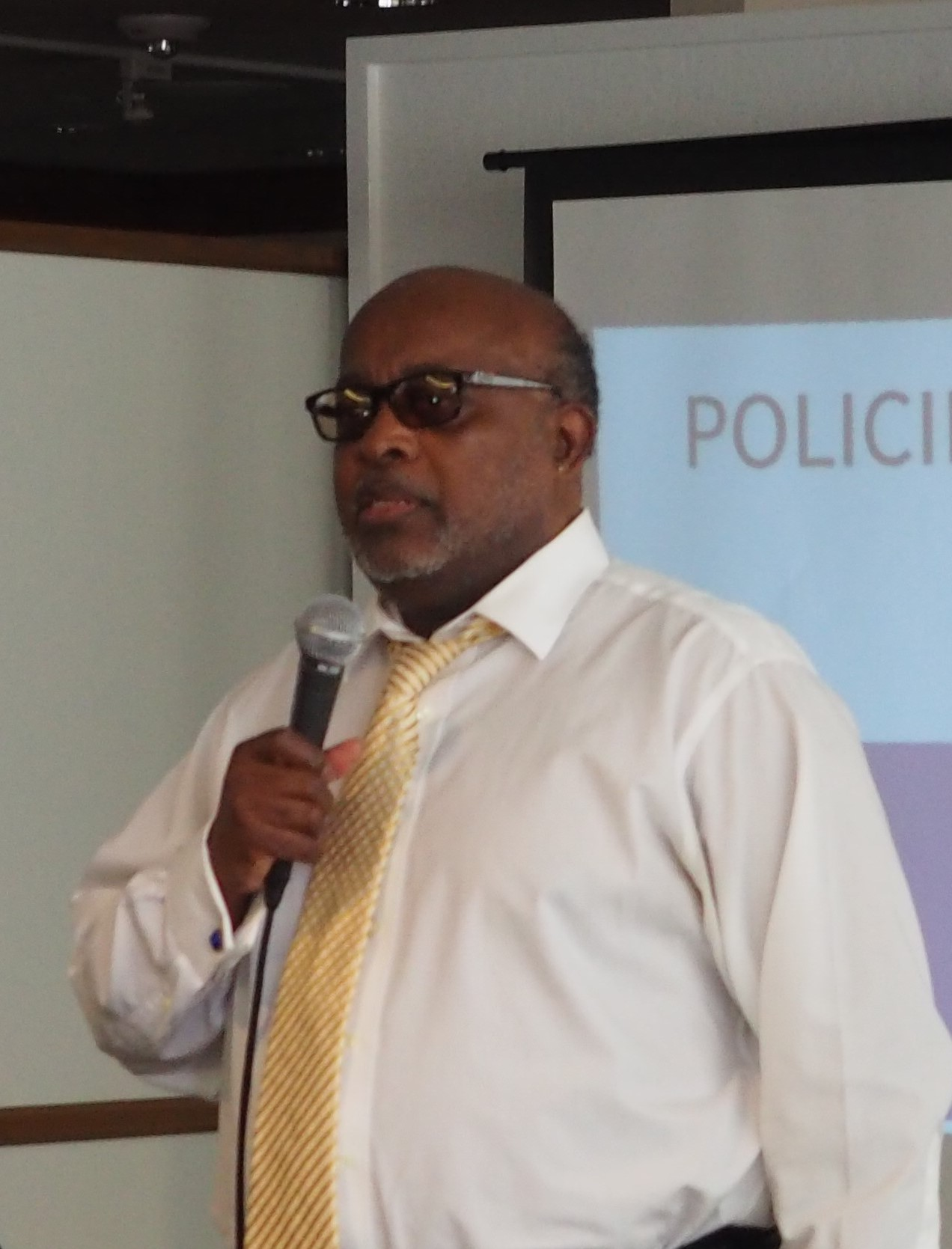

Academic background
- Education: University of Connecticut

Academic work
- Discipline: Sociologist
- Institutions: Pacific Lutheran University, Wake Forest University, Colgate University, George Mason University

Earl Smith is an American sociologist, currently the Rubin Distinguished Professor Emeritus of American Ethnic Studies at Wake Forest University, and formerly the Arthur A. Sio Distinguished Professor of Community and Diversity at Colgate University. He teaches at George Mason University.

== Life ==
He graduated from University of Connecticut. He taught at Pacific Lutheran University, until 1996. He joined the Wake Forest faculty in 1996 to become the director of American ethnic studies.

== Works ==
- Race, Sport and the American Dream, Carolina Academic Press, 2006. ISBN 9781611634877, OCLC 857288123
- Policing the Black Body, 2018. ISBN 9781442276956
