= Hubert McNeill Poteat =

American classicist

Hubert Poteat
- Born: Hubert McNeill Poteat; 2 December 1886; Wake Forest, North Carolina, U.S.
- Died: 29 January 1958 (aged 71); Wake Forest
- Education: Wake Forest University; Columbia University
- Occupations: Classicist (Latin); author; academic
- Spouse: Essie Moore Morgan (m. 1912)
- Scientific career
- Fields: Classics
- Workplaces: Wake Forest University

Hubert McNeill Poteat (1886–1958) was an American classicist, author and academic.

== Biography ==
Poteat was born on 12 December 1886 in Wake Forest, Wake County, North Carolina.

He attended the Wake Forest University, where he graduated in 1906 with an arts degree, majoring in Latin. Poteat taught Latin at the university for the next two years, where he also graduated in 1908 with a Masters of Arts. He completed his PhD at Columbia University in 1912; and his dissertation was on Repetition in Latin Poetry, with Special Reference to the Metrical Treatment of Repeated Words.

He married Essie Moore Morgan on 26 June 1912.

Poteat returned Wake Forest University, where he was tenured as a professor of Latin. He is the author of a number of notable books, including: Selected Letters of Cicero, Selected Letters of Pliny, Practical Hymnology, and Repetition in Latin poetry.

He died on 29 January 1958, aged 71, in Wake Forest.

== See also ==
- The Dictionary of Modern American Philosophers
