= Under a War-Torn Sky =

2001 novel by L. M. Elliot

- Author: L.M. Elliott
- Language: English
- Publication date: 2001

Under a War-Torn Sky is a young adult war novel about a young man flying a B-24 in World War II. When his plane is shot down and he is trapped behind enemy lines, he is helped by kind French citizens to escape and get back to his home. Written by American author L.M. Elliott, the novel was first published in 2001. It won a number of awards on publication and has sold over 200,000 copies in the U.S. and abroad.

Elliott drew inspiration for the novel from her father, who served in World War II. He was a bomber pilot in real life and was shot down behind enemy lines, much like the main character in the novel.

The sequel to this novel, A Troubled Peace, came out in August, 2009.

== Summary ==
At the age of 19, Henry Forrester joins the war as a pilot in the Royal Air Force, flying missions against the German Luftwaffe over northern France. When his aircraft is shot down during a mission behind enemy lines, he is forced to make his way across occupied France on foot. Wounded and short of supplies, he relies on the assistance of members of the French Resistance to evade German forces and reach safety. During his journey, he witnesses the dangers faced by the French population under occupation and develops an appreciation for the resistance fighters who risked their lives to protect him. He eventually succeeds in returning home to his family.

== Awards ==
Notable Book in Social Studies for Young People (NCSS/CBC), 2002 Jefferson Cup Honor Book, 2002 Winner, Borders’ Original Voices Award for Young Adult Literature, 2001 Best Children's Books of the Year, 2002, Bank Street College of Education, CBC Maryland Black-eyed Susan Award, finalist, 2004-5 Iowa Teen Award, finalist, 2003-4 Pennsylvania Young Readers’ Choice, finalist, 2002-3 South Carolina Jr. Book Award, finalist, 2003-4 Books About Trauma, Tragedy and Loss, 2002, CBC
