= Kent Vrana =

American pharmacologist

Kent Eugene Vrana is an American pharmacologist.

He was born in Lincoln, Nebraska, and attended Thomas Jefferson High School in Council Bluffs, Iowa. Vrana then enrolled at the University of Iowa, where he studied biochemistry, graduating in 1978. He pursued a doctorate in the subject from the Louisiana State University Medical Center, completing graduate study in 1983, followed by postdoctoral study at the Carnegie Institution of Washington. Vrana began teaching at West Virginia University in 1986 as an assistant professor. He left for the Wake Forest University School of Medicine in 1991, and became a full professor in 2001. Vrana was named chair of the Department of Pharmacology at the Milton S. Hersey Medical Center at Penn State in 2004 after Elliot Vesell stepped down. He concurrently holds the Elliot S. Vesell professorship at the Pennsylvania State University College of Medicine, and serves as the founding Director of the Pennsylvania-designated Medical Marijuana Academic Clinical Research Center (ACRC) at Penn State.
