= J. Wayne Meredith =

J. Wayne Meredith is a Richard T. Myers Professor and Chair of the Department of Surgery, Chief of Clinical Chairs and Chief of Surgery at Wake Forest Baptist Health. He served as the founding Executive Director of the Childress Institute for Pediatric Trauma.

His clinical specialties include General Thoracic Surgery, Burns, Complex Trauma Care, Thoracic Surgery and Trauma Surgery.

== Education ==
He received a B.A. from Emory University in 1974. He attended Wake Forest School of Medicine, earning an M.D. in 1978.

== Professional appointments ==
- American Association for the Surgery on Trauma (AAST)
- American College of Surgeons, Medical Director, Trauma Programs (2006-2010)
- American Trauma Society, Board of Directors, North Carolina Division (1992–Present)
- Southern Surgical Association, Treasurer (2006-2010), President (2011)
- The American Board of Surgery, Board of Directors
- The American Board of Thoracic Surgery, Board of Directors
