= Thomas Jones Pence =

American politician (1873–1916)

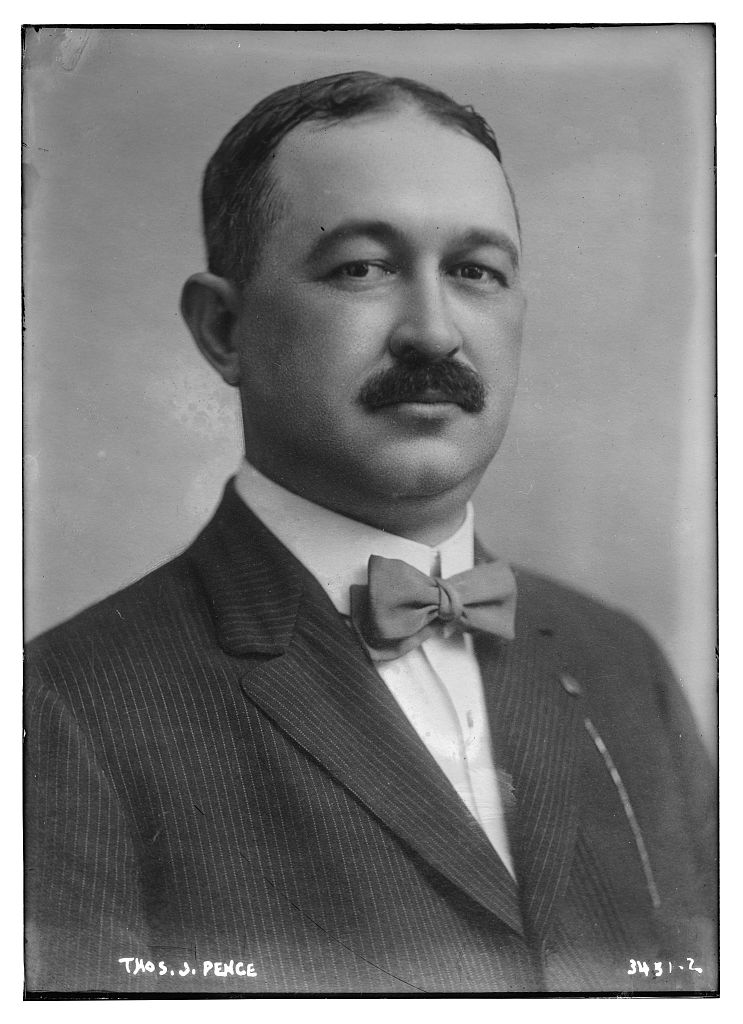
Thomas Jones Pence (1873-1916) circa 1915

Thomas Jones Pence (March 28, 1873 – March 27, 1916) was the secretary of the Democratic National Committee.

He was born in Raleigh, North Carolina. He attended Wake Forest College.

He operated a theater in North Carolina. Next, he managed a semi-professional baseball team. He became a sports reporter in 1895. In 1902 he was sent to Washington, D.C., as the political reporter for the Raleigh Post. He then changed jobs and went to work for the Raleigh News and Observer, owned by Josephus Daniels.

Pence died of pneumonia in 1916. He was buried in Oakwood Cemetery in Raleigh.
