= Jeffrey Eisenach =

American economist

Jeffrey A. Eisenach is an American economist. He is a visiting scholar at the American Enterprise Institute, and holds a position with National Economic Research Associates, a consulting company. Eisenach has participated as an expert in government evaluations of economic and state utility issues in the U.S., Canada, Australia, and, South America.

== Biography ==
In 2016, Eisenach served on then President-elect Donald Trump's transition team as a member of the Federal Communications Commission agency landing team. Eisenach's participation on this landing team was notable for his industry ties and past advocacy for deregulation of telecommunications companies.

Eisenach attended Claremont Men's College, now Claremont McKenna College, in Claremont, California.

== Controversies ==
In the 1990s, Eisenach was a close associate of Newt Gingrich. He headed GOPAC, and later the Progress and Freedom Foundation, which Gingrich used to raise tax-exempt funds for his Renewing American Civilization campaign. Speaker Gingrich was later reprimanded by the House of Representatives by a vote of 395-28 and fined $300,000 for providing untrue information to a House Ethics Committee investigation of the matter.

In 2016, The New York Times found that Eisenach advocated against proposed net neutrality regulations in his capacity as an American Enterprise Institute (AEI) visiting scholar, including publishing AEI working papers, inviting FCC officials to speak out against net neutrality at both private and public AEI events, and testifying before congress regarding the potential harms of net neutrality using his AEI title, while simultaneously working as a paid consultant for Verizon and Verizon's trade association, GSMA. The report found that Eisenach rarely disclosed this conflict of interest in his policy work as a scholar at AEI.

== Publications ==
- Jeffrey A. Eisenach, R. May, ed. Communications Deregulation and FCC Reform: What Comes Next?. Kluwer Academic Publishers, 2001 (ISBN 978-1461355953)
- Jeffrey A. Eisenach, Thomas M. Lenard, ed. Competition, Innovation and the Microsoft Monopoly: Antitrust in the Digital Marketplace. Kluwer Academic Publishers, 1999 (ISBN 978-0792384649)
- Jeffrey A. Eisenach, Albert Stephen Hanser, ed. Readings in Renewing American Civilization. McGraw-Hill, Inc., 1993 (ISBN 978-0070196117)
