= L. M. Elliott =

American writer (born 1957)

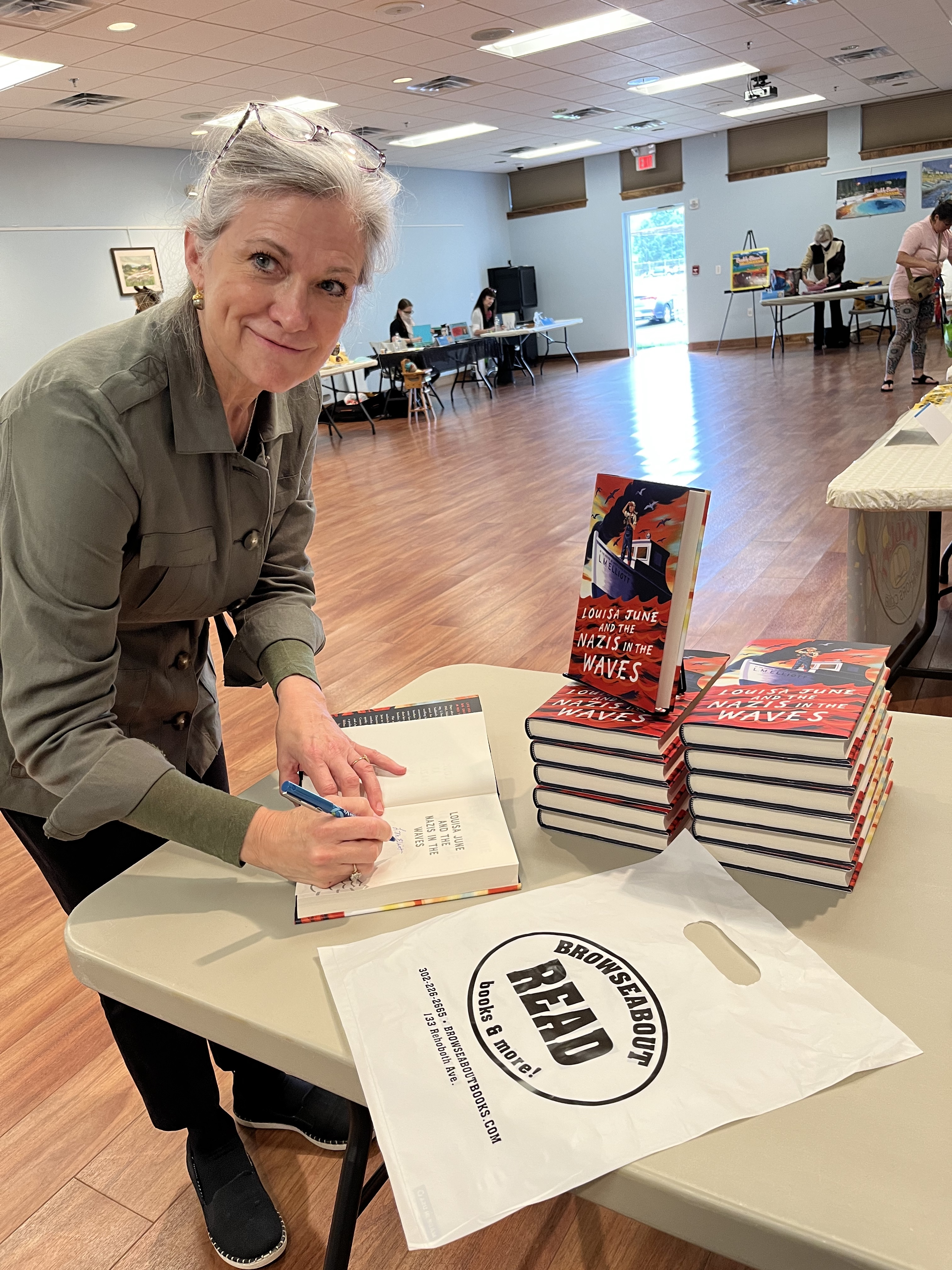
- Elliott at the 2022 Sussex County Children's Book Fair in Delaware
- Born: 1957 (age 68–69)
- Education: Wake Forest University; University of North Carolina at Chapel Hill
- Writing career
- Genre: Children's fiction
- Website: www.lmelliott.com

Laura Malone Elliott, known by her pen name L. M. Elliott, is an American author of more than a dozen young adult novels, including Under a War-Torn Sky (2001), Give Me Liberty (2008), A Troubled Peace (2009), Da Vinci’s Tiger (2015), Suspect Red (2017), Hamilton and Peggy! A Revolutionary Friendship (2018), Walls (2021), and Louisa June and the Nazis in the Waves (2022).

== Biography ==
Elliott was born in 1957 near Washington, D.C. She graduated from Wake Forest University and holds a master's in journalism from the University of North Carolina at Chapel Hill. She also holds several national literary awards, such as the Scott O'Dell Award for Historical Fiction for Bea and the New Deal Horse, the NCSS/CBC Notable Book in Social Studies for her works Under a War-Torn Sky, A Troubled Peace, Suspect Red, and Walls, which were also named Bank Street College of Education Best Books along with Hamilton and Peggy! and Flying South. Her book Suspect Red, a 1950s McCarthy-era story of two teenage boys caught up in the Red Scare’s paranoia, was the winner of the 2018 Grateful American Book Prize. Hamilton and Peggy! A Revolutionary Friendship, a biographical novel about the youngest of the Schuyler Sisters, also received a Grateful American Book Prize Honorable Mention that same year.

Elliott was a long-time senior writer for the Washingtonian magazine.

Elliott was twice a finalist for the National Magazine Award and recipient of numerous Dateline awards. She wrote often on children, women's issues, and health, and co-authored two adult nonfiction works during her time as a journalist.

Her historical fiction novels fit the genre of coming of age fiction, featuring teenage protagonists encountering rites of passage.

Elliott has also authored five picture books for children with New York Times best-selling illustrator, Lynn Munsinger, including: Hunter's Best Friend at School, Hunter and Stripe and the Soccer Showdown, and Hunter's Big Sister, and A String of Hearts. Their last illustrated title together, Thanksgiving Day Thanks, was released in January, 2013.

Elliott lives in Fairfax County, Virginia, and has an adult daughter and son, also professional creative artists. She appears frequently at middle schools and high schools where she speaks with students about writing, research, and the value of reading about history.

== Awards ==
- NCSS/CBC Notable Book in Social Studies (Under a War-Torn Sky)
- Jefferson Cup Honor Book (Under a War-Torn Sky)
- Bank Street College of Education's Best Book (Under a War-Torn Sky)
- Borders' Original Voices Award (Under a War-Torn Sky)
- IRA/Children's Book Council Children's Choice (Hunter's Best Friend at School)
- Bank Street College of Education Best Book (Flying South)
- Joan G. Sugarman Literature Award (Flying South)
- NCSS/CBC Notable (A Troubled Peace)
- Jefferson Cup Overfloweth (Across a War-Tossed Sea)
- IRA Teacher's Choice (Annie, Between the States)
- New York Public Library Book for the Teen Age (Annie, Between the States)
- Grateful American Book Prize (Suspect Red)
- NCSS/CBC Notable Book in Social Studies (Suspect Red)
- Bank Street College of Education Best Book (Suspect Red)
- Grateful American Book Prize Honorable Mention (Hamilton and Peggy! A Revolutionary Friendship)
- Bank Street College of Education Best Book of the Year (Hamilton and Peggy! A Revolutionary Friendship)
- Bank Street College of Education Best Book (Walls)
- NCSS/CBC Notable (Walls)
- Kirkus 100 Best YA Novels (Walls)
- Kirkus Best YA Historical Fiction (Walls)
- Scott O'Dell Award for Historical Fiction (Bea and the New Deal Horse)

== Works ==
- Shattered Dreams: The Story of Charlotte Fedders with Charlotte Fedders (New York: Harper & Row, 1987)
- A to Z Guide to Your Child's Behavior: A Parent's Easy and Authoritative Reference to Hundreds of Everyday Problems and Concerns from Birth to Twelve Years (contributor) (New York: Putnam, 1993)
- Under a War-Torn Sky (New York: Hyperion, 2001)
- Hunter's Best Friend at School (New York: HarperCollins, 2002)
- Flying South (New York: HarperCollins, 2003)
- Annie, Between the States (New York: Katherine Tegen Books, 2004)
- Hunter & Stripe and the Soccer Showdown (New York: Katherine Tegen Books, 2005)
- Give Me Liberty (New York: Katherine Tegen Books, 2006)
- Hunter's Big Sister (New York: Katherine Tegen Books, 2007)
- A Troubled Peace (New York: Katherine Tegen Books, 2009)
- A String of Hearts (New York: Katherine Tegen Books, 2010)
- Thanksgiving Day Thanks (New York: Katherine Tegen Books, 2013)
- Across a War-Tossed Sea (New York: Disney-Hyperion, 2014)
- Da Vinci's Tiger (New York: Katherine Tegen Books, 2015)
- Suspect Red (Los Angeles: Disney-Hyperion, 2017)
- Hamilton and Peggy! A Revolutionary Friendship (New York: Katherine Tegen Books, 2018)
- Storm Dog (New York: Katherine Tegen Books, 2020)
- Walls (Chapel Hill: Algonquin, 2021)
- Louisa June and the Nazis in the Waves (New York: Katherine Tegen Books, 2022)
- Bea and the New Deal Horse (New York: Katherine Tegen Books, 2023)
- Truth, Lies, and the Questions in Between (New York: Little, Brown Books for Young Readers, 2025)
