= Huw Davies (chemist) =

British chemist

- Education: Cardiff University; University of East Anglia
- Scientific career
- Fields: Chemistry
- Workplaces: Emory University; University at Buffalo; Wake Forest University
- Thesis: Studies in non-phenolic oxidative coupling (1980)

Huw Madoc Lynn Davies FRSC is a Welsh chemist who has been Asa Griggs Candler Professor of Organic Chemistry at Emory University since 2008.

Born in Aberystwyth, Wales he graduated with a first-class degree in chemistry from Cardiff University in 1977 and completed his PhD at the University of East Anglia in 1980. After a post-doctoral position at Princeton University he joined the faculty at Wake Forest University where he became a full professor. He subsequently joined the University at Buffalo where he held the positions of UB Distinguished Professor and Larkin Professor of Organic Chemistry. In 2008, he moved to Emory University.

Davies' research involves the development of new synthetic methods and their applications in total synthesis and drug discovery. His program covers design of chiral catalysts, carbenoid chemistry, development of new synthetic methodology, total synthesis of biologically active natural products, and development of chiral therapeutic agents. Many research groups have used his chiral dirhodium catalysts.
