= Peyton Perea =

American soccer player

Personal information
- Full name: Peyton Leigh Perea
- Date of birth: March 28, 1997 (age 29)
- Place of birth: Riverside, California
- Height: 5 ft 8 in (1.73 m)
- Position: Midfielder

College career
Years	Team	Apps	(Gls)
2015–2018	Wake Forest Demon Deacons	62	(12)

Senior career*
Years	Team	Apps	(Gls)
2019	North Carolina Courage	0	(0)
2019–2020	Santa Teresa		
2020–2021	North Carolina Courage	0	(0)
2022	Glasgow City	1	(0)
- * Club domestic league appearances and goals

Peyton Leigh Perea (born March 28, 1997) is an American professional soccer player who plays as a midfielder. She has previously played for North Carolina Courage of the National Women's Soccer League (NWSL).

== Club career ==
Perea made her NWSL debut for North Carolina Courage on September 12, 2020.

She signed for Scottish club Glasgow City in January 2022.
