= James C. Eisenach =

American anesthesiologist

James C. Eisenach is an American anesthesiologist, currently the FM James, III Professor at Wake Forest School of Medicine, Wake Forest University and the former Editor-in-Chief of American Society of Anesthesiologists's journal Anesthesiology.
