= Terri Fisher =

American psychologist

- Occupation: Psychologist
- Awards: Fellow of the Society for the Scientific Study of Sexuality (2010)

Academic background
- Education: Wake Forest University; University of Georgia

Academic work
- Discipline: Human sexuality
- Sub-discipline: Parent-child communication on sexuality; gender stereotypes concerning sexuality
- Institutions: Ohio State University at Mansfield; Sewanee: The University of the South

Terri Dale Fisher (or Crotty) is an American psychologist who specializes in human sexuality, particularly parent-child communication on sexuality and gender stereotypes concerning sexuality. A Fellow of the Society for the Scientific Study of Sexuality, she is Professor Emeritus of Psychology at the Ohio State University at Mansfield and Teaching Professor of Psychology at Sewanee: The University of the South.

== Biography ==
Terri Dale Fisher got her BA in Psychology with honors at Wake Forest University in 1975. She later studied at the University of Georgia, where she got her MS in Psychology in 1977, their 1980 Zimmer Award for graduates, and her PhD in Psychology in 1982; her dissertation Parent-child communication and adolescents' sexual knowledge and attitudes was supervised by Robert H. Pollack.

The same year, she started working at the Ohio State University at Mansfield as Assistant Professor of Psychology, and she was promoted to Associate Professor in 1988, to Professor in 2010, and Professor Emeritus in 2015. She also worked as an Assistant Dean (2012-2015) and Psychology Program Coordinator (1996-2012) at OSU Mansfield. She started working at Sewanee: The University of the South in 2016 as Visiting Professor of Psychology and was promoted to Teaching Professor of Psychology in 2019; she also works at Sewanee as Director of Undergraduate Research and Scholarship and Director of Research in Psychology.

As an academic, she specializes in human sexuality, particularly parent-child communication on sexuality and gender stereotypes concerning sexuality. She was co-editor of the third edition of Speaking of Sexuality: Interdisciplinary Readings (2010), of Current directions in sexuality and intimate relationships (2010), and of the 2011 and 2020 editions of Handbook of Sexuality-Related Measures. She won the 1983 Hugo G. Beigel Award for her article "Acute alcohol intoxication and female orgasmic response". In addition to reviewing for dozens of academic journals, she has been consulting editor of the Journal of Sex Research since 1994 and was a guest editor for Personality and Social Psychology Bulletin (2012) and the Journal of Experimental Social Psychology (2014). She was the president of the Society for the Scientific Study of Sexuality's Midcontinent Region from 1999 to 2000.

She was elected Fellow of the Society for the Scientific Study of Sexuality in 2010.

Fisher is married and lives in Signal Mountain, Tennessee.
