= Justin Catanoso =

- Born: November 5, 1959 (age 66)
- Education: Wildwood Catholic High School; Pennsylvania State University (BA); Wake Forest University (MA)
- Occupations: Journalism, Education
- Children: 3
- Website: www.justincatanoso.com

Justin Catanoso (born November 5, 1959) is the author of My Cousin the Saint -- A Search for Faith, Family and Miracles, the founding executive editor of The Business Journal (1998-2011), and the fourth director of journalism at Wake Forest University from 2011-2016, where he is now a full professor.

== Education ==
Catanoso earned a BA in journalism from Pennsylvania State University in 1982 and a Masters of Arts from Wake Forest in 1993. He grew up in North Wildwood, New Jersey, where he attended Margaret Mace School (K-8) and Wildwood Catholic High School, where he graduated in 1978.

== My Cousin the Saint ==
Published by William Morrow and Company in hard cover in 2008, My Cousin the Saint is about Catanoso's "journey in search of faith and family" after discovering Gaetano Catanoso, a cousin of the author's grandfather, was a pious Italian parish priest, later canonized by Pope Benedict XVI in 2005. He is represented by Brian DeFiore of DeFiore and Company, and the HarperCollins Speakers Bureau, both in New York City.

The book was a Summer Reading selection by the National Sons of Italy Association and a Book of the Month Club pick. It was published in paperback by Harper Perennial in 2009 with the revised subtitle "A Story of Love, Miracles, and an Italian Family Reunited."

Previously Catanoso delivered a commentary about his cousin on National Public Radio's Morning Edition.

== Career ==
Catanoso was the executive editor of The Business Journal, a weekly business and economics newspaper covering the Piedmont Triad region. He helped found the paper in 1998 after spending 11 years as a reporter with the Greensboro News & Record. Since 2013, Catanoso has specialized in reporting global climate change and climate policy with an emphasis on the forests and other ecosystems. He has covered seven United Nations climate summits throughout the world, including the 2015 summit that produced the Paris Agreement. He is a regular contributor to Mongabay, a leading international environmental news organization. His reporting has been sponsored by the Pulitzer Center on Crisis Reporting in Washington, D.C., for whom he is also a regular speaker to student groups. He is also a board member of the Center for Environment, Energy and Sustainability at Wake Forest and communication consultant to the school’s environmental NGO based in the Peruvian Amazon, CINCIA, funded by the US Agency for International Development (USAID).

In 1992, his investigative reporting for the News & Record into fraud in the tobacco industry earned a Pulitzer Prize nomination, a Science in Society Journalism Award from the National Association of Science Writers, the Public Service Award from the NC Press Association and Medical Writer of the Year in North Carolina.

Before moving to Greensboro, North Carolina, Catanoso had the police and courts beat for the Knoxville Journal for two years.

At Wake Forest, where Catanoso joined as an adjunct in 1993, he teaches editing and reporting classes. He joined the faculty full time in 2011, becoming a full professor in 2015. Catanoso affiliated the journalism program at Wake Forest with the Campus Consortium of the Pulitzer Center for Crisis Reporting in Washington, D.C.

== Personal life ==
He has three grown children: Emilia, a middle school teacher; Rosalie, a digital journalist; and Sophia, a specialist in Eastern medicine. All graduated from UNC system schools.

== Notes ==
1. NPR: Our Cousin, the Saint
2. Justin Catanoso: The Book
