= Adrian Bardon =

American philosopher

Education
- Education: University of Massachusetts Amherst (PhD)

Philosophical work
- Era: 21st-century philosophy
- Region: Western philosophy
- Institutions: Wake Forest University
- Main interests: philosophy of time

Adrian Bardon is an American philosopher and Professor of Philosophy at Wake Forest University. He is known for his works on philosophy of time.

== Books ==
- The Truth About Denial: Bias and Self-Deception in Science, Politics, and Religion (Oxford University Press, 2020)
- A Brief History of the Philosophy of Time (Oxford University Press, 2013)
- The Illusions of Time: Philosophical and Psychological Essays on Timing and Time Perception, with Valtteri Arstila, Sean Power, and Argiro Vatakis (Palgrave Macmillan, 2019)
- A Companion to the Philosophy of Time, with Heather Dyke (Wiley-Blackwell, 2013)
- The Future of the Philosophy of Time (Routledge, 2012)
- Hume’s Naturalism (Synthese 152, Vol. 3, 2006)
