= Wake Forest Demon Deacons men's basketball statistical leaders =

The Wake Forest Demon Deacons men's basketball statistical leaders are individual statistical leaders of the Wake Forest Demon Deacons men's basketball program in various categories, including points, assists, blocks, rebounds, and steals. Within those areas, the lists identify single-game, single-season, and career leaders. The Demon Deacons represent the Wake Forest University in the NCAA's Atlantic Coast Conference.

Wake Forest initiated its participation in intercollegiate basketball in 1905. However, the school's record book typically omits records from before the 1950s due to the incomplete and inconsistent nature of the available data from that period. Given that scoring was significantly lower during this era and teams played fewer games in a typical season, it is unlikely that many, if any, players from this period would appear on these lists.

The NCAA did not officially record assists as a statistic until the 1983–84 season, and blocks and steals until the 1985–86 season. However, Wake Forest's record books include players in these statistics before these official recording seasons. These lists are updated through the end of the 2020–21 season.

== Scoring ==
Career
Rk	Player	Points	Seasons
1	Dickie Hemric	2587	1951–52 1952–53 1953–54 1954–55
2	Randolph Childress	2208	1991–92 1992–93 1993–94 1994–95
3	Len Chappell	2165	1959–60 1960–61 1961–62
4	Tim Duncan	2117	1993–94 1994–95 1995–96 1996–97
5	Skip Brown	2034	1973–74 1974–75 1975–76 1976–77
6	Rod Griffin	1985	1974–75 1975–76 1976–77 1977–78
7	Charlie Davis	1970	1968–69 1969–70 1970–71
8	Justin Gray	1946	2002–03 2003–04 2004–05 2005–06
9	Robert O’Kelley	1885	1997–98 1998–99 1999–00 2000–01
10	Darius Songaila	1859	1998–99 1999–00 2000–01 2001–02

Season
Rk	Player	Points	Season
1	Len Chappell	932	1961–62
2	Juke Harris	750	2025-26
3	Dickie Hemric	746	1954–55
4	Len Chappell	745	1960–61
5	Charlie Davis	690	1970–71
6	Dickie Hemric	680	1953–54
7	Charlie Davis	664	1969–70
8	Alondes Williams	649	2021–22
9	Tim Duncan	645	1996–97
	Bob Leonard	645	1964–65

Single game
Rk	Player	Points	Season	Opponent
1	Charlie Davis	51	1968–69	American
2	Len Chappell	50	1961–62	Virginia
3	Dickie Hemric	48	1954–55	Virginia
4	Dickie Hemric	44	1952–53	Duke
5	Charlie Davis	42	1969–70	NC State
	Len Chappell	42	1961–62	South Carolina
	Len Chappell	42	1960–61	South Carolina
8	Charlie Davis	41	1969–70	North Carolina
	Dickie Walker	41	1969–70	Virginia
	Len Chappell	41	1959–60	Virginia

== Rebounds ==
Career
Rk	Player	Rebounds	Seasons
1	Dickie Hemric	1820	1951–52 1952–53 1953–54 1954–55
2	Tim Duncan	1570	1993–94 1994–95 1995–96 1996–97
3	Len Chappell	1213	1959–60 1960–61 1961–62
4	Devin Thomas	1061	2012–13 2013–14 2014–15 2015–16
5	Rod Griffin	947	1974–75 1975–76 1976–77 1977–78
6	Anthony Teachey	869	1980–81 1981–82 1982–83 1983–84
7	Eric Williams	858	2002–03 2003–04 2004–05 2005–06
8	Gil McGregor	850	1968–69 1969–70 1970–71
9	Josh Howard	836	1999–00 2000–01 2001–02 2002–03
10	Ron Watts	833	1962–63 1963–64 1964–65

Season
Rk	Player	Rebounds	Season
1	Dickie Hemric	515	1954–55
2	Len Chappell	470	1961–62
3	Tim Duncan	457	1996–97
4	Dickie Hemric	447	1951–52
5	Dickie Hemric	424	1953–54
6	Dickie Hemric	416	1952–53
7	Tim Duncan	401	1994–95
8	Tim Duncan	395	1995–96
9	Len Chappell	393	1960–61
10	Ron Watts	352	1964–65

Single game
Rk	Player	Rebounds	Season	Opponent
1	Dickie Hemric	36	1954–55	Clemson
2	Dickie Hemric	31	1951–52	Duke
3	Dickie Hemric	30	1952–53	South Carolina
4	Dickie Hemric	25	1951–52	Cornell
	Dickie Hemric	25	1951–52	Navy
6	Len Chappell	24	1961–62	Virginia
	Len Chappell	24	1961–62	South Carolina
8	Tim Duncan	23	1996–97	Virginia
	Tim Duncan	23	1994–95	Winthrop
	Len Chappell	23	1959–60	Duke
	Dickie Hemric	23	1952–53	La Salle

== Assists ==
Career
Rk	Player	Assists	Seasons
1	Muggsy Bogues	781	1983–84 1984–85 1985–86 1986–87
2	Ishmael Smith	612	2006–07 2007–08 2008–09 2009–10
3	Skip Brown	579	1973–74 1974–75 1975–76 1976–77
4	Derrick McQueen	575	1988–89 1989–90 1990–91 1991–92
5	Danny Young	493	1980–81 1981–82 1982–83 1983–84
6	Randolph Childress	472	1991–92 1992–93 1993–94 1994–95
7	Bryant Crawford	467	2015–16 2016–17 2017–18
8	Frank Johnson	460	1976–77 1977–78 1978–79 1979–80 1980–81
9	Brandon Childress	443	2016–17 2017–18 2018–19 2019–20
10	Codi Miller-McIntyre	441	2012–13 2013–14 2014–15 2015–16

Season
Rk	Player	Assists	Season
1	Muggsy Bogues	276	1986–87
2	Muggsy Bogues	245	1985–86
3	Chris Paul	212	2004–05
	Tyree Appleby	212	2022–23
5	Muggsy Bogues	207	1984–85
6	Skip Brown	187	1976–77
7	Ishmael Smith	186	2006–07
8	Ishmael Smith	185	2009–10
9	Chris Paul	183	2003–04
10	Bryant Crawford	182	2016–17
	Frank Johnson	182	1980–81

Single game
Rk	Player	Assists	Season	Opponent
1	Muggsy Bogues	17	1986–87	Clemson
	Muggsy Bogues	17	1985–86	North Carolina
3	Ishmael Smith	15	2006–07	Georgia Tech
	Muggsy Bogues	15	1986–87	North Carolina
5	Muggsy Bogues	14	1986–87	Charlotte
	Muggsy Bogues	14	1986–87	MD-Eastern Shore
	Frank Johnson	14	1980–81	Maryland
8	Muggsy Bogues	13	1985–86	Charlotte
	Frank Johnson	13	1980–81	Johns Hopkins
10	Tyree Appleby	12	2022–23	Syracuse
	Chris Paul	12	2004–05	Texas
	Muggsy Bogues	12	1986–87	North Carolina
	Muggsy Bogues	12	1986–87	Georgia Tech
	Muggsy Bogues	12	1986–87	Richmond
	Muggsy Bogues	12	1986–87	NC State
	Muggsy Bogues	12	1985–86	Duke
	Muggsy Bogues	12	1985–86	Clemson
	Muggsy Bogues	12	1985–86	Hawaii
	Muggsy Bogues	12	1985–86	Boston College
	Danny Young	12	1982–83	Fresno State
	Skip Brown	12	1976–77	UNC-Asheville
	Skip Brown	12	1974–75	Long Island
	Skip Brown	12	1974–75	Duke
	Skip Brown	12	1974–75	Iowa
	Len Chappell	12	1960–61	Penn State

== Steals ==
Career
Rk	Player	Steals	Seasons
1	Muggsy Bogues	275	1983–84 1984–85 1985–86 1986–87
2	Josh Howard	215	1999–00 2000–01 2001–02 2002–03
3	Frank Johnson	204	1976–77 1977–78 1978–79 1979–80 1980–81
4	Skip Brown	195	1973–74 1974–75 1975–76 1976–77
5	Danny Young	194	1980–81 1981–82 1982–83 1983–84
6	Randolph Childress	180	1991–92 1992–93 1993–94 1994–95
7	Chris Paul	160	2003–04 2004–05
8	Ishmael Smith	153	2006–07 2007–08 2008–09 2009–10
9	Bryant Crawford	149	2015–16 2016–17 2017–18
10	Cameron Hildreth	148	2021–22 2022–23 2023–24 2024–25

Season
Rk	Player	Steals	Season
1	Muggsy Bogues	89	1985–86
2	Muggsy Bogues	85	1984–85
3	Chris Paul	84	2003–04
4	Chris Paul	76	2004–05
5	Muggsy Bogues	70	1986–87
6	Skip Brown	69	1975–76
	Danny Young	69	1983–84
8	Josh Howard	64	2002–03
	Skip Brown	64	1976–77
10	Jerry Schellenberg	62	1976–77
	Skip Brown	62	1974–75

Single game
Rk	Player	Steals	Season	Opponent
1	Muggsy Bogues	8	1985–86	Georgia Southern
	Muggsy Bogues	8	1984–85	Davidson
3	Chris Paul	7	2004–05	Florida State
	Justin Gray	7	2004–05	George Washington
	Josh Howard	7	2001–02	Georgia Tech
	Danny Young	7	1983–84	Maryland
	Fran McCaffery	7	1977–78	Seattle
	Larry Harrison	7	1976–77	East Tennessee St.
9	Cameron Hildreth	6	2024–25	Georgia Tech
	Bryant Crawford	6	2015–16	NC State
	Jeff Teague	6	2007–08	Air Force
	Chris Paul	6	2004–05	Elon
	Chris Paul	6	2003–04	SMU
	Josh Howard	6	2002–03	Georgia Tech
	Rodney Rogers	6	1990–91	Clemson
	Muggsy Bogues	6	1985–86	Duke
	Muggsy Bogues	6	1983–84	Fairleigh Dickinson
	Danny Young	6	1983–84	NC State
	Danny Young	6	1981–82	North Carolina
	Frank Johnson	6	1977–78	Duke
	Leroy McDonald	6	1977–78	Oregon State
	Jerry Schellenberg	6	1976–77	Arkansas
	Skip Brown	6	1975–76	Davidson

== Blocks ==
Career
Rk	Player	Blocks	Seasons
1	Tim Duncan	481	1993–94 1994–95 1995–96 1996–97
2	Anthony Teachey	203	1980–81 1981–82 1982–83 1983–84
3	Larry Harrison	188	1975–76 1976–77 1977–78 1978–79
4	Guy Morgan	182	1978–79 1979–80 1980–81 1981–82
5	Ty Walker	144	2008–09 2009–10 2010–11 2011–12
	Devin Thomas	144	2012–13 2013–14 2014–15 2015–16
7	Josh Howard	143	1999–00 2000–01 2001–02 2002–03
8	Antwan Scott	140	1998–99 1999–00 2000–01 2001–02
9	Kyle Visser	116	2003–04 2004–05 2005–06 2006–07
10	Chas McFarland	114	2006–07 2007–08 2008–09 2009–10

Season
Rk	Player	Blocks	Season
1	Tim Duncan	135	1994–95
2	Tim Duncan	124	1993–94
3	Tim Duncan	120	1995–96
4	Tim Duncan	102	1996–97
5	Larry Harrison	80	1977–78
6	Ty Walker	79	2010–11
7	Anthony Teachey	70	1983–84
	Anthony Teachey	70	1982–83
9	Guy Morgan	65	1979–80
10	Doral Moore	61	2017–18

Single game
Rk	Player	Blocks	Season	Opponent
1	Ty Walker	11	2010–11	Marist
2	Tim Duncan	10	1995–96	Maryland
3	Tim Duncan	9	1996–97	Florida State
	Tim Duncan	9	1996–97	Maryland
	Guy Morgan	9	1979–80	Florida Southern
	Larry Harrison	9	1977–78	Rhode Island
7	Ty Walker	8	2011–12	Maryland
	Carson Desrosiers	8	2011–12	Loyola (Md.)
	Ty Walker	8	2010–11	Xavier
	Tim Duncan	8	1994–95	Oklahoma St.
	Tim Duncan	8	1994–95	Marshall
	Tim Duncan	8	1993–94	Charleston
	Tim Duncan	8	1993–94	Winthrop
	Larry Harrison	8	1977–78	Washington
