= Guy Morgan =

Guy Morgan may refer to:

- Guy Morgan (basketball) (born 1960), retired American basketball player
- Guy Morgan (writer) (1908–1964), British screenwriter
- Guy Morgan (rugby union) (1907–1973), Welsh rugby union player and cricketer
