= WCSK =

Coordinates: 36.527°N 82.587°W

- Kingsport, Tennessee; United States
- Broadcast area: Tri-Cities TN / VA
- Frequency: 90.3 MHz
- Branding: The Voice of Kingsport City Schools

Programming
- Format: High school radio

Ownership
- Owner: Kingsport City Schools

History
- First air date: April 8, 1980
- Call sign meaning: "City Schools of Kingsport"

Technical information
- Licensing authority: FCC
- Facility ID: 34914
- Class: A
- ERP: 195 watts
- HAAT: 280 meters (920 ft)

Links
- Public license information: Public file; LMS
- Website: Official website

WCSK (90.3 FM) is a non-commercial, educational FM radio station in Kingsport, Tennessee, licensed by the Federal Communications Commission to the Kingsport Board of Education.

The radio studio is in Dobyns-Bennett High School. The WCSK radio transmitter is mounted on a tower atop Bays Mountain in Kingsport. It broadcasts at an effective radiated power of 195 watts. In addition to the city of Kingsport, the station's signal is heard in portions of Sullivan, Hawkins, and Washington counties in Tennessee, and in parts of Scott County, Virginia.

== See also ==
- List of radio stations in Tennessee
- List of high school radio stations in the United States
