= Dobyns-Bennett High School =

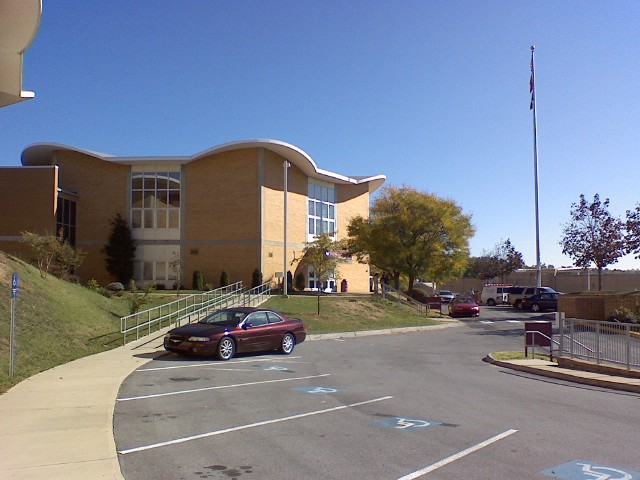

Location
- 1 Tribe Way; Kingsport, Tennessee 37664; United States; 36°32′13.5″N 82°31′47.8″W

Information
- Type: Public
- Motto: To strive, to seek, to find, and not to yield
- Established: 1918 (108 years ago)
- School district: Kingsport City Schools
- Principal: Brian Tate
- Staff: 166.33 (FTE)
- Enrollment: 2,351 (2023–2024)
- Student to teacher ratio: 14.13
- Colors: Maroon and grey
- Mascot: Indian
- Website: https://dbhs.k12k.com/

Dobyns-Bennett High School is a high school (grades 9–12) in Kingsport, Tennessee, United States. It typically educates around 2,400 students, although enrollment for the 2022–23 academic year exceeded 2,500 students.

As a part of Kingsport City Schools, students must be city residents paying city taxes to attend. Students that are not residents of the city may pay a tuition fee to attend. This tuition is collected to account for tax differences between county and city residents in order to help subsidize the cost of school programs and facilities. Dobyns-Bennett features a variety of programs for students of all academic levels. The many classes offered cater to many types of students who may want to attend technical schools or universities across the nation.

== Radio station ==
Local radio station 90.3 FM WCSK is broadcast from Dobyns-Bennett.

== Fine arts ==
As of 2026, the Dobyns-Bennett Band has remained active for 100 years. The band has competed in The Bands Of America Grand National Championships nine times. The band was invited to perform at the Macy's Thanksgiving Day Parade three times, the Rose Parade in Pasadena four times, and at First inauguration of Barack Obama in 2009. Additionally, the band was named Large High School Division and Fan Favorite titles in the inaugural Metallica Marching Band Competition in 2023. The band has received the John Philip Sousa Foundation Sudler Flag award and Sudler Shield awards.

The Dobyns-Bennett Winter guard was named Scholastic A Class Champion at Winter Guard International World Championships in 2023, earning a score of 98.915, the second highest score in Scholastic A Class history.

== Notable alumni ==
- Lisa Alther – American author and novelist.
- James Frazier Barker – Former President of Clemson University.
- Darwin Bond – Track and field athlete
- Skip Brown – Basketball Player, High School and College All-American, Wake Forest University (1973–77); selected in 1977 NBA Draft by the Boston Celtics.
- Bob Cifers – Back, University of Tennessee (1946 Detroit Lions; 1947–48 Pittsburgh Steelers; 1949 Green Bay Packers)
- Ed Cifers – End, University of Tennessee (1941–42, 1946 Washington Redskins; 1947–48 Chicago Bears)
- Denver Crawford – Defensive Tackle, University of Tennessee (1942, 43, 46, 47), New York Yankees of the AAFC (1948)
- Bobby Dodd – College Football Hall of Fame member as a player at the University of Tennessee and coach at Georgia Tech.
- Mike Faulkerson Dulaney – FB, University of North Carolina at Chapel Hill (1995–1997 Chicago Bears; 1998 Carolina Panthers)
- Blair Fowler – YouTube Personality who was on The Amazing Race 28
- John Fulkerson – basketball player
- Bobby Harshbarger – Tennessee State Senator
- Daniel Kilgore – C, Appalachian State University (2011–16 San Francisco 49ers)
- Mark H. Landes, U.S. Army major general
- Blake Leeper – Paralympic silver medallist
- Hal Miller – High School and College Football All-American Tackle, Georgia Tech, drafted by the San Francisco 49ers in 1953.
- John Palmer – former NBC News correspondent.
- Jimmy Quillen – Member of the United States House of Representatives representing Tennessee's 1st congressional district, 1963–1997
- Mike Roberts – Professional baseball player (drafted in 1972 by the Kansas City Royals) and college baseball coach (1978-98 University of North Carolina at Chapel Hill).
- Coty Sensabaugh – CB, Clemson University (2012-2015 Tennessee Titans, 2016 Los Angeles Rams, 2016 New York Giants, 2017-2019 Pittsburgh Steelers).
- Gerald Sensabaugh – S, East Tennessee State University and the University of North Carolina at Chapel Hill (2005–08 Jacksonville Jaguars; 2009–12 Dallas Cowboys)
- Selwa Carmen Showker "Lucky" Roosevelt – Class of 1946 was Chief of Protocol of the United States for almost seven years from 1982 to 1989—longer than anyone has ever served in that position

== See also ==
- List of high schools in Tennessee
