= Justin Gray (basketball) =

American basketball player (born 1984)

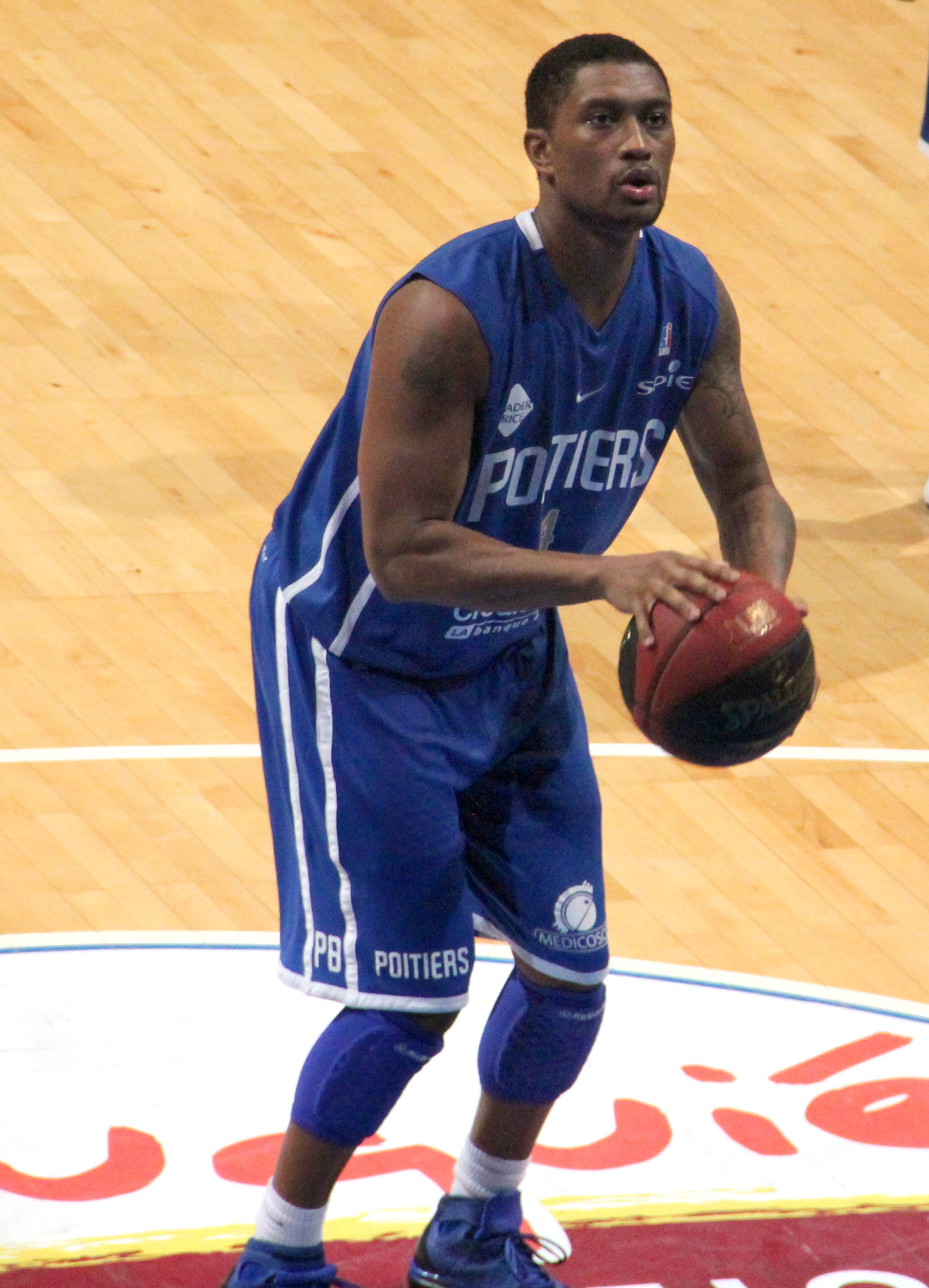

Coastal Carolina Chanticleers
- Title: Head coach
- League: Sun Belt Conference

Personal information
- Born: March 31, 1984 (age 42) Raleigh, North Carolina, U.S.
- Listed height: 6 ft 3 in (1.91 m)
- Listed weight: 193 lb (88 kg)

Career information
- High school: West Charlotte (Charlotte, North Carolina); Oak Hill Academy (Mouth of Wilson, Virginia)
- College: Wake Forest (2002–2006)
- NBA draft: 2006: undrafted
- Playing career: 2006–2018
- Position: Shooting guard
- Coaching career: 2019–present

Career history

Playing
- 2006–2007: Verviers-Pepinster
- 2007–2008: Belfius Mons-Hainaut
- 2008–2009: ČEZ Nymburk
- 2009–2010: Turów Zgorzelec
- 2010–2011: PAOK
- 2011: Donetsk
- 2011: Guangzhou Free Man
- 2011–2012: Skyliners Frankfurt
- 2012: Kavala
- 2012–2013: Poitiers 86
- 2013: Pertevniyal
- 2013–2014: Homenetmen Beirut
- 2014: Rilski Sportist
- 2014–2015: Apollon Limassol
- 2015–2017: Tsmoki-Minsk
- 2017–2018: U-BT Cluj-Napoca
- 2018: Tsmoki-Minsk

Coaching
- 2019–2021: Winthrop (assistant)
- 2021–2024: Western Carolina
- 2024–present: Coastal Carolina

Career highlights
- First-team All-ACC (2004); 2× Second-team All-ACC (2005, 2006)

Justin Gray (born March 31, 1984) is an American former professional basketball player and current head coach of the men's basketball team at Coastal Carolina. He was the head coach of Western Carolina from 2021 to 2024, and before that an assistant coach at Winthrop from 2019 to 2021. Gray played professionally overseas from 2006 to 2018.

== High school ==
After playing his first three years at West Charlotte High School, Gray played his final year of high school basketball at Oak Hill Academy in Mouth of Wilson, Virginia, a prep basketball program that has produced NBA players such Kevin Durant and Carmelo Anthony. Gray was ranked by ESPN as the 86th best high school senior for the 2002 class. He was recruited across the nation because of his success at Oak Hill, eventually committing to Wake Forest.

== College career ==
=== Freshman year ===
During his first season at Wake Forest, Gray average 12.7 points per game and was named to the ACC All-Freshman team. Gray was also named ACC Freshman of the week once and was named a Fourth-Team All-American Freshman by Sporting News. Wake Forest finished the season with a 25–6 record, an ACC regular-season championship, and fell to Auburn in the Round of 32 in the 2003 NCAA tournament.

=== Sophomore year ===
With the addition of freshman Chris Paul, who was also Gray’s roommate, Gray and Paul formed a solid backcourt that became one of the best in the ACC. Gray averaged 17.0 points per game and earned First-Team All-ACC honors. Wake Forest finished the season at 21–10 after losing to 1 seed Saint Joseph's in the Sweet Sixteen in the 2004 NCAA tournament.

=== Junior year ===
Gray averaged 16.0 points per game his junior year, helping lead Wake Forest, along with Paul and Eric Williams, to a 27–6 record and second-place finish in the ACC. The team entered the 2005 NCAA tournament as a No. 2 seed, but were upset in the second round by No. 7 West Virginia. Gray was named Second-Team All-ACC.

=== Senior year ===
After Chris Paul left for the NBA, the burden fell on Gray and Williams. Gray finished his final season at Wake Forest with 18.2 points per game and led the team to the 2006 NIT, where they lost to Minnesota. Wake Forest finished the season with a 17–17 record and 12th place finish in the ACC. Gray was again named Second-Team All-ACC.

Gray finished his Wake Forest career with 1,946 points and 319 three-point field goals. Gray ranks 8th all-time in school history for points scored, was named All-ACC three times, and named to the ACC All-Freshman team.

== Professional career ==
After graduating from Wake Forest, Gray played professionally in 13 different countries, including Greece, China, Germany, and France, while having three stints in the NBA Summer League. He also played for Team Wake The Nation in the 2018 edition of The Basketball Tournament.

== Coaching career ==
=== Winthrop ===
After spending the 2018–19 season as Director of Basketball Development at Wake Forest, Gray joined Pat Kelsey's staff at Winthrop as an assistant coach in July 2019. Gray helped Winthrop to a 24–10 record during the 2019–20 season and a 2020 Big South tournament championship before COVID-19 canceled the 2020 NCAA tournament. In the 2020–21 season, Gray helped Winthrop to a 23–2 record and another Big South tournament championship before losing in the first round of the 2021 NCAA tournament to 5 seed Villanova.

=== Western Carolina ===
On April 13, 2021, Gray was hired as the 19th head men's basketball coach at Western Carolina.

== Head coaching record ==
Record table
Season	Team	Overall	Conference	Standing	Postseason
Western Carolina Catamounts (Southern Conference) (2021–2024)
2021–22	Western Carolina	11–21	5–13	10th	
2022–23	Western Carolina	18–16	10–8	4th	CBI First Round
2023–24	Western Carolina	22–10	11–7	4th	
Western Carolina:		51–47 (.520)	26–28 (.481)		
Coastal Carolina Chanticleers (Sun Belt Conference) (2024–present)
2024–25	Coastal Carolina	10–22	3–15	T–13th	
2025–26	Coastal Carolina	19–13	11–7	T–2nd	
2026–27	Coastal Carolina	2-4			
Coastal Carolina:		31–39 (.443)	14–22 (.389)		
Total:		82–86 (.488)			
National champion Postseason invitational champion Conference regular season champion Conference regular season and conference tournament champion Division regular season champion Division regular season and conference tournament champion Conference tournament champion
