= Rupert Pate =

American football player (1917–2014)

No. 74, 63, 5
- Position: Guard

Personal information
- Born: September 6, 1917; Goldsboro, North Carolina, U.S.
- Died: May 20, 2014 (aged 96); Goldsboro, North Carolina, U.S.
- Listed height: 6 ft 1 in (1.85 m)
- Listed weight: 205 lb (93 kg)

Career information
- High school: Goldsboro
- College: Wake Forest (1936-1939)
- NFL draft: 1940: 20th round, 181st overall pick

Career history
- Chicago Cardinals (1940); New York Americans (1941); Philadelphia Eagles (1941–1942)

Awards and highlights
- First-team All-SoCon (1939)

Career NFL statistics
- Games played: 9
- Touchdowns: 1
- Stats at Pro Football Reference

Rupert George Pate (September 6, 1917 – May 20, 2014) was an American professional football player who was an offensive lineman for three seasons for the Chicago Cardinals and Philadelphia Eagles. He was selected in the 20th round of the 1940 NFL draft with the 181st overall pick.

Pate attended Wake Forest College where he was chosen captain of the football team in 1939, made All-State and All-Southern Conference and played in the 1939 Blue-Gray Football Bowl. He joined the professional Chicago Cardinals team in 1940 and played with the Philadelphia Eagles in 1941–1942. He served in World War II from 1943 to 1945. Pate was elected to Goldsboro High School's Hall of Fame in 1989.

Until his death, he was one of the oldest surviving professional football players.
