= Jarran Reed =

American football player (born 1992)

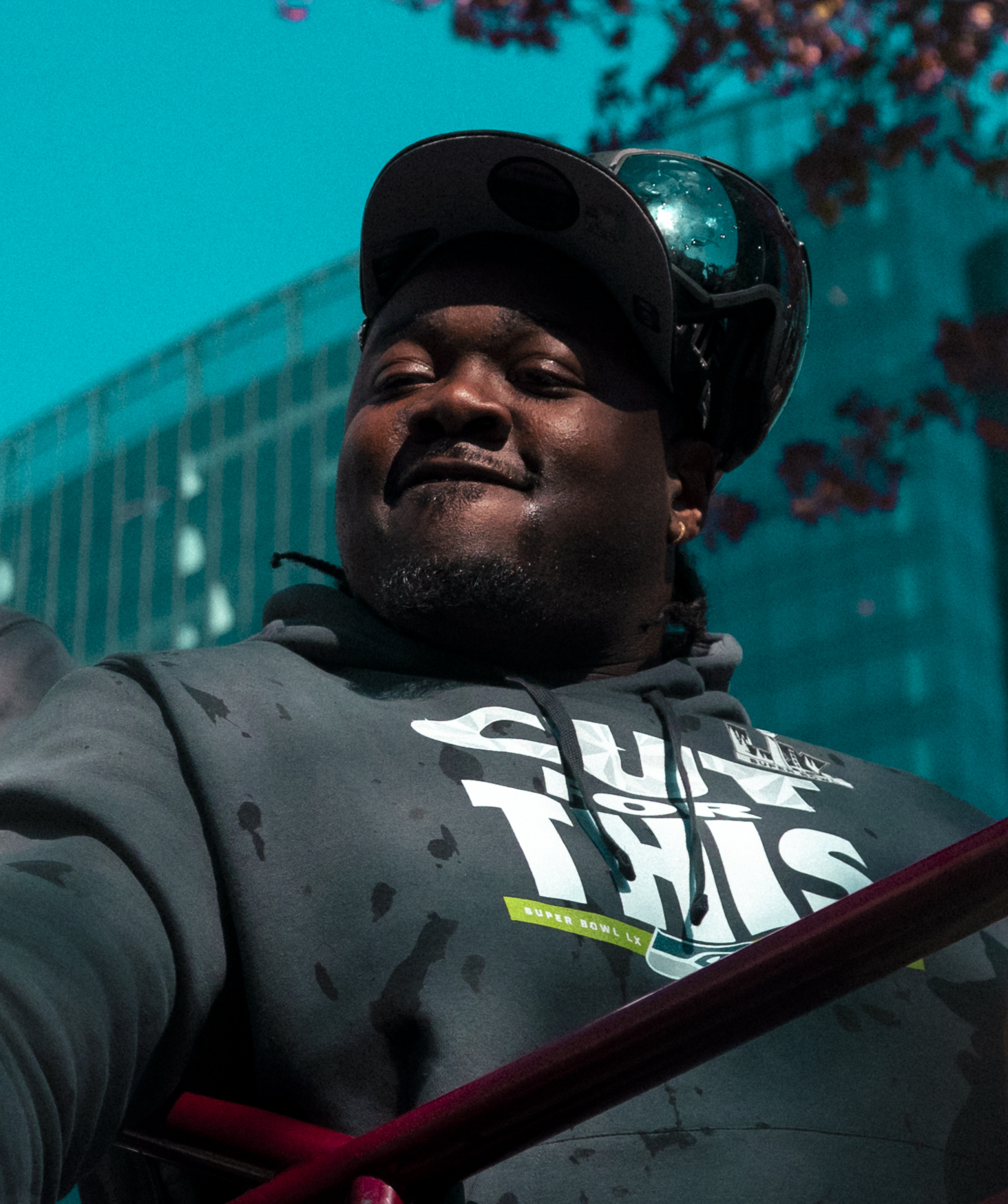
- Reed at the Super Bowl LX parade in 2026

No. 90 – Seattle Seahawks
- Position: Defensive end
- Roster status: Active

Personal information
- Born: December 16, 1992 (age 33); Goldsboro, North Carolina, U.S.
- Listed height: 6 ft 3 in (1.91 m)
- Listed weight: 315 lb (143 kg)

Career information
- High school: Goldsboro (NC)
- College: East Mississippi (2012–2013); Alabama (2014–2015)
- NFL draft: 2016: 2nd round, 49th overall pick

Career history
- Seattle Seahawks (2016–2020); Kansas City Chiefs (2021); Green Bay Packers (2022); Seattle Seahawks (2023–present)

Awards and highlights
- Super Bowl champion (LX); CFP national champion (2015); First-team All-SEC (2015)

Career NFL statistics as of Week 10, 2026
- Total tackles: 439
- Sacks: 42.0
- Forced fumbles: 8
- Fumble recoveries: 6
- Pass deflections: 11
- Stats at Pro Football Reference

Jarran Kentrel Reed (born December 16, 1992) is an American professional football defensive end for the Seattle Seahawks of the National Football League (NFL). He played college football for the East Mississippi Lions and Alabama Crimson Tide, and was selected by the Seahawks in the second round of the 2016 NFL draft. He also played one season each for the Kansas City Chiefs and Green Bay Packers. Reed won Super Bowl LX with the Seattle Seahawks.

== Early life ==
Reed attended Goldsboro High School in Goldsboro, North Carolina and graduated in 2011. In order to qualify himself for a D1 school, Reed attended Hargrave Military Academy for a year after he had graduated high school.

== College career ==
Reed attended East Mississippi Community College in 2012 and 2013. Reed helped lead his team to a win in the NJCAA national championship during the 2013 season. In Reed's time with East Mississippi Community College he was credited with 100 career tackles, including 10.5 tackles for loss. Prior to 2014, Reed transferred to the University of Alabama.

During his first year at Alabama, he played in all 14 games and made 13 starts. He recorded 55 tackles and one sack. Reed considered entering the 2015 NFL draft but decided against it and returned to Alabama for his senior year. Reed played in all 15 games his senior season and helped lead his team to a College Football Playoff national champion victory. He recorded 57 tackles and one sack during his senior season.

== Professional career ==
Pre-draft measurables
Height	Weight	Arm length	Hand span	Wingspan	40-yard dash	10-yard split	20-yard split	20-yard shuttle	Three-cone drill	Vertical jump	Broad jump
6 ft 2 7/8 in (1.90 m)	307 lb (139 kg)	33 3/8 in (0.85 m)	10 1/2 in (0.27 m)	6 ft 9 1/8 in (2.06 m)	5.21 s	1.80 s	3.02 s	4.75 s	7.77 s	31 in (0.79 m)	8 ft 8 in (2.64 m)
All values from NFL Combine

=== Seattle Seahawks (first stint) ===
On April 29, 2016, Reed was selected in the second round of the 2016 NFL draft with the 49th overall selection by the Seattle Seahawks after the team traded their second-, and fourth-round picks (56th, and 124th overall) to the Chicago Bears in order to move up to #49 in order to select Reed. On May 5, 2016, Reed signed a 4-year deal worth $4.889 million overall with a $1.756 million bonus.

As a rookie in 2016, Reed played 15 games and finished the year with 34 tackles, 1.5 sacks, and three passes defended. He finished his second season in 2017 with 45 tackles, 1.5 sacks and 4 tackles for loss.

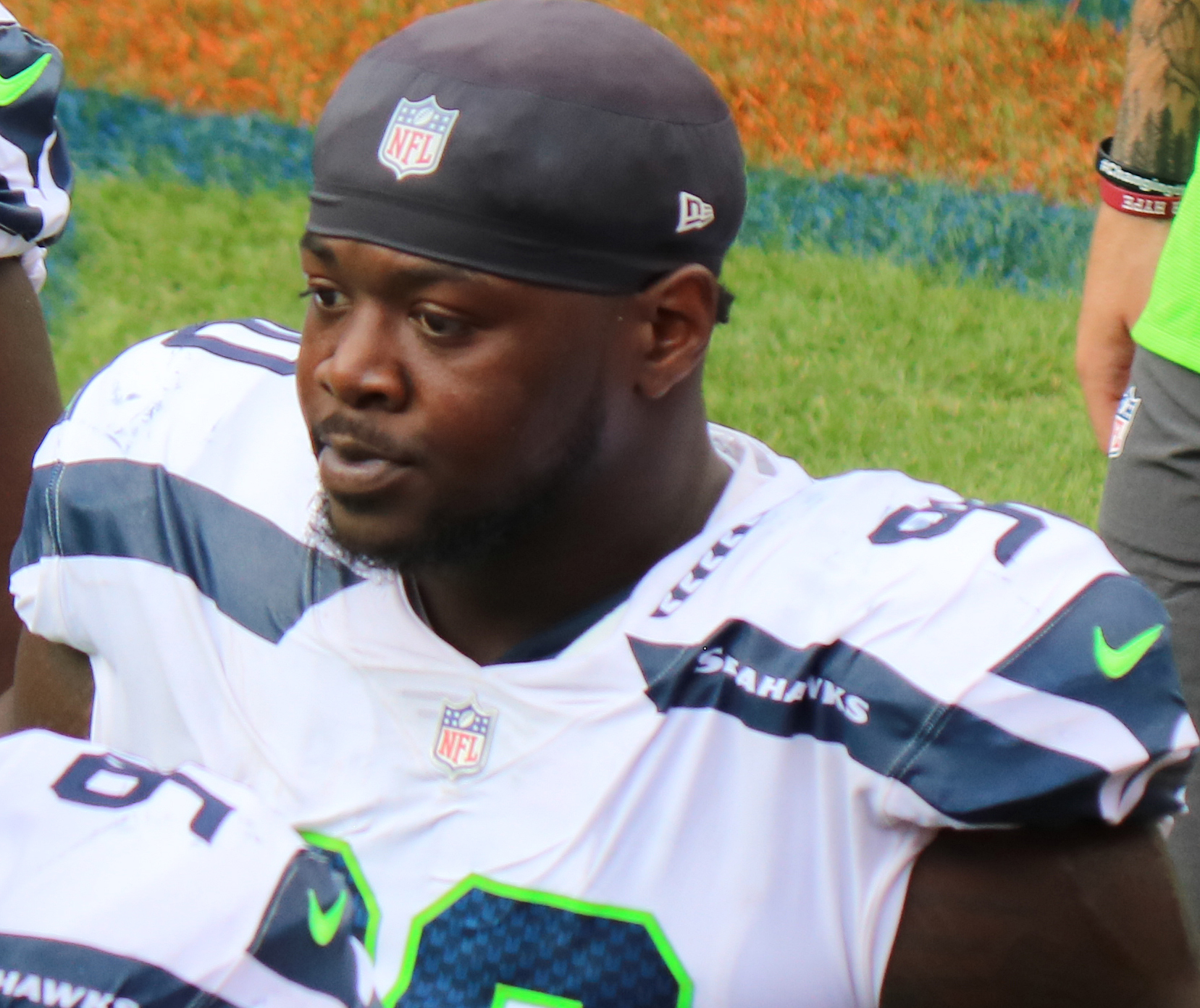
Reed playing for the Seahawks in 2018

In 2018, Reed had a breakout year. He had a career-high 2 sacks in a Week 3 win over the Dallas Cowboys, then matched his production from the previous two years in just four games with another sack the following week. He finished the season with 5 sacks in his final 5 games, to bring his season total up to 10.5 sacks.

Reed was suspended the first six games of the 2019 season for a violation of the personal conduct policy for a reported domestic violence incident in early 2017. After the Seahawks traded for Jadeveon Clowney, Reed changed his number to 91. Reed was reinstated from suspension on October 14, 2019, and was activated to the active roster prior to Week 7.

On March 16, 2020, Reed signed a two-year, $23 million contract extension with the Seahawks. In Week 9 against the Buffalo Bills, Reed sacked quarterback Josh Allen 2.5 times during the 44–34 loss. In the Wild Card Round of the playoffs against the Los Angeles Rams, Reed sacked Jared Goff two times during the 30–20 loss. Reed was released after the season on March 26, 2021.

=== Kansas City Chiefs ===
Reed signed a one-year, $5 million deal with the Kansas City Chiefs on March 31, 2021, with performance incentives to increase his potential pay up to $7 million. He started all 17 games in 2021, recording 43 tackles, 2.5 sacks, and two forced fumbles.

=== Green Bay Packers ===
Reed signed a one-year, $3.25 million deal with the Green Bay Packers on March 23, 2022. The contract included incentives for Reed to increase his salary up to $4.5 million, and had void years to spread the cap charge of his $1.865 million signing bonus over the next four years.

=== Seattle Seahawks (second stint) ===
On March 16, 2023, Reed signed a two-year, $12.8 million contract to return to the Seahawks.

On March 10, 2025, Reed signed a three-year, $25 million contract extension with the Seahawks. On November 8, Reed was placed on injured reserve due to wrist and thumb injuries; he later underwent surgery to address the wrist injury. He was activated on December 6, ahead of the team's Week 14 matchup against the Atlanta Falcons.

On February 8, 2026, Reed was part of the Seahawks team that won Super Bowl LX, with two assisted tackles in the 29–13 win over the New England Patriots.

== NFL career statistics ==
Legend
	Won the Super Bowl
**Bold**	Career High

=== Regular season ===
Season	Team	Games		Tackles				Fumbles		Interceptions	
Season	Team	GP	GS	Total	Solo	Ast	Sck	FF	FR	PD	INT
2016	SEA	15	6	34	13	21	1.5	0	0	**3**	0
2017	SEA	15	15	45	23	22	1.5	1	0	1	0
2018	SEA	16	16	50	**34**	16	**10.5**	0	**2**	0	0
2019	SEA	10	10	27	10	17	2.0	1	0	1	0
2020	SEA	16	16	38	20	18	6.5	1	0	1	0
2021	KC	**17**	**17**	43	23	20	2.5	**2**	1	1	0
2022	GB	**17**	14	52	29	23	2.5	1	**2**	0	0
2023	SEA	16	16	**54**	27	**27**	7.0	1	1	2	0
2024	SEA	**17**	8	45	21	24	4.5	1	0	2	0
2025	SEA	13	3	31	11	20	2.5	0	0	0	0
2026	SEA	10	6	20	6	14	1.0	0	0	0	0
Total		162	127	439	217	222	42.0	8	6	11	0
Source: pro-football-reference.com

=== Postseason ===
Season	Team	Games		Tackles				Fumbles		Interceptions	
Season	Team	GP	GS	Total	Solo	Ast	Sck	FF	FR	PD	INT
2016	SEA	2	2	3	3	0	0.0	0	0	0	0
2018	SEA	1	1	4	2	2	0.0	0	0	0	0
2019	SEA	2	2	3	2	1	0.0	0	0	0	0
2020	SEA	1	1	5	4	1	**2.0**	0	0	0	0
2021	KC	**3**	**3**	**13**	**5**	**8**	1.0	0	0	0	0
2025	SEA	**3**	1	6	1	5	0.0	0	0	0	0
Total		12	10	34	17	17	3.0	0	0	0	0
Source: pro-football-reference.com
