= Kingsport City Schools =

School district in Tennessee, United States

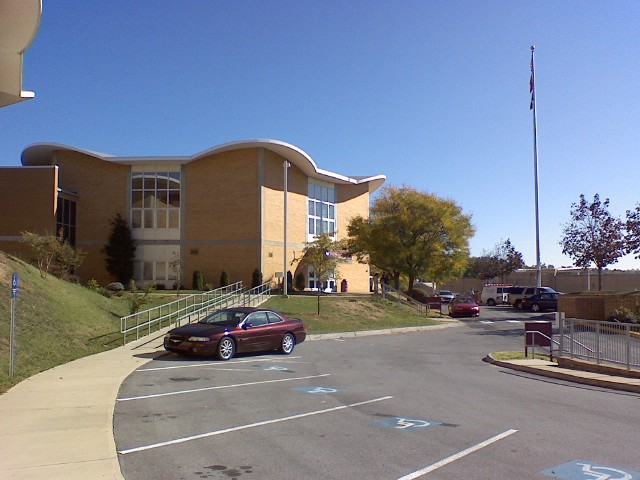
- Dobyns-Bennett High School entrance

Location
- 400 Clinchfield Street, Suite 200; Kingsport, Tennessee 37660 United States

District information
- Grades: PK-12
- Superintendent: Dr. Chris Hampton
- Schools: 13

Students and staff
- Students: 7,400

Other information
- Website: www.k12k.com

Kingsport City Schools is a public school district that serves the residents of the city of Kingsport, Tennessee, United States. In 2024, the district's enrollment was over 7,400 students.

In Sullivan County the district includes almost all of that county's portion of Kingsport, and some unincorporated areas. In Hawkins County the district includes that county's portion of Kingsport.

== Schools ==
=== Pre-K schools ===
- John Adams Elementary School
- Andrew Jackson Elementary School
- Andrew Johnson Elementary School
- John F. Kennedy Elementary School
- Abraham Lincoln Elementary School
- Kingsport Child Development Center
- Palmer Center
- V.O. Dobbins Community Center

=== Elementary schools (K–5) ===
- John Adams Elementary School
- Andrew Jackson Elementary School
- Thomas Jefferson Elementary School
- Andrew Johnson Elementary School
- John F. Kennedy Elementary School
- Abraham Lincoln Elementary School
- Theodore Roosevelt Elementary School
- George Washington Elementary School

=== Middle schools (6–8) ===
- Ross N. Robinson Middle School
- John Sevier Middle School

=== High school (9–12) ===
- Dobyns-Bennett High School
- D-B EXCEL

== See also ==
- WCSK student radio station
