= Goldsboro High School =

American public school in North Carolina

Location
- 700 N Herman Street; Goldsboro, North Carolina 27530; United States; 35°23′11″N 77°58′49″W

Information
- School type: Public
- School district: Wayne County Public Schools
- CEEB code: 341510
- Principal: Mario Re
- Staff: 24.82 (FTE)
- Grades: 9–12
- Enrollment: 442 (2023–2024)
- Student to teacher ratio: 17.81
- Colors: Navy blue and gold
- Team name: Cougars
- Website: www.waynecountyschools.org/o/goldsborohigh

Black and white photograph of the 1909 Goldsboro High School senior class, taken in May 1909

Goldsboro High School is a public high school located in Wayne County, Goldsboro, North Carolina, United States. The school's mascot is the Cougar, and the school colors are navy and gold.

== Notable people ==
=== Alumni ===
- Stanley Bryant, football player in the CFL
- Travis Coleman, former NFL defensive back
- Calvin Daniels, former NFL defensive linebacker
- Karl Eikenberry, US Army officer and diplomat
- Carl Kasell, radio personality
- Clyde King, former MLB player, coach, manager, and general manager
- Jerry Narron, former MLB player, manager, and now a coach
- Dave Odom, college basketball coach
- Rupert Pate, former NFL offensive lineman
- Jarran Reed, NFL defensive end, 2015 CFP national champion with Alabama
- Michael S. Regan, United States Environmental Protection Agency administrator nominee
- Anthony Teachey, professional basketball player
- David Thornton, former NFL outside linebacker with the Indianapolis Colts and Tennessee Titans
- Tito Wooten, former NFL safety

=== Faculty ===
- Andy Griffith, actor, also taught English and Drama at Goldsboro High School for a few years
