= Wake Forest Demon Deacons men's basketball =

NCAA University Basketball team

2026–27 Wake Forest Demon Deacons men's basketball team
- University: Wake Forest University
- First season: 1906–07; 120 years ago
- Athletic director: John Currie
- Head coach: Steve Forbes; 7th season, 110–82 (.573)
- Location: Winston-Salem, North Carolina
- Arena: Lawrence Joel Veterans Memorial Coliseum (capacity: 14,665)
- NCAA division: Division I
- Conference: ACC
- Nickname: Demon Deacons
- Colors: Old gold and black
- Student section: Screamin' Demons
- All-time record: 1,660–1,336 (.554)
- NCAA tournament record: 28–23 (.549)

NCAA Division I tournament Final Four
- 1962
Other NCAA Division I tournament results
Elite Eight	1939, 1961, 1962, 1977, 1984, 1996
Sweet Sixteen	1953, 1961, 1962, 1977, 1984, 1993, 1995, 1996, 2004
Appearances	1939, 1953, 1961, 1962, 1977, 1981, 1982, 1984, 1991, 1992, 1993, 1994, 1995, 1996, 1997, 2001, 2002, 2003, 2004, 2005, 2009, 2010, 2017

NIT champions
- 2000

Conference tournament champions
- SoCon: 1953 ACC: 1961, 1962, 1995, 1996

Conference regular-season champions
- SoCon: 1939 ACC: 1960, 1962, 1995, 2003

Uniforms
Home	Away	Alternate

The Wake Forest Demon Deacons men's basketball team represents Wake Forest University in NCAA Division I college basketball and competes in the Atlantic Coast Conference (ACC). Through the years, the program has produced many NBA players, among them are Hall of Famer Tim Duncan, 12× All-Star Chris Paul, 1× All-Star Jeff Teague, Sixth Man of the Year Rodney Rogers, and 1× All-Star Josh Howard. The Demon Deacons have won the Atlantic Coast Conference tournament four times, in 1961, 1962, 1995, and 1996. Wake Forest has appeared in 23 NCAA tournaments, most recently appearing in 2017. The current coach is Steve Forbes, who was hired on April 30, 2020.

== History ==
=== Dave Odom era (1989–2001) ===
In 1989, Wake Forest would name Dave Odom as its new head coach. During his 12 seasons, Odom led the Demon Deacons to back-to-back ACC men's basketball tournament championship's in 1995 where the team defeated North Carolina and 1996 by defeating Georgia Tech. Tim Duncan would also win back to back-to-back ACC Player of the Year awards in 1996 and 1997.

=== Skip Prosser era (2001–2007) ===
Prosser began his career at Wake Forest in 2001 and led the Demon Deacons to the NCAA tournament in each of his first four years there. Prosser is credited for sparking participation in the Wake Forest student Screamin' Demons and increasing attendance with game-time antics, like having the Demon Deacon mascot enter Lawrence Joel on a Harley Davidson and filling the coliseum with Zombie Nation's "Kernkraft 400" at tip-off and when the Deacons would go on a run. During Prosser's tenure as head coach, home season tickets sold out for the first time ever in 2004. During the 2004–05 season, the team was ranked #1 by the Associated Press for the first time in the school's history and won a school-record 27 games. At Wake Forest, Prosser won 100 games faster than all but two ACC coaches. In 2003, his Demon Deacons squad became the first from the ACC to ever lead the nation in rebounding. In the summer of 2007, Prosser had organized what was said to be a top-five recruiting class for the upcoming year.

Every senior whom Prosser coached earned his degree in four years.

=== Danny Manning era (2014–2020) ===
On April 8, 2014, Wake Forest announced the hiring of Danny Manning. Despite high expectations entering his first season, the Demon Deacons only finished with a 13–19 overall record and 5–13 record in the ACC. They would lose to Virginia Tech in the first round of the ACC tournament.

In Manning's second season, Wake Forest's 2015 recruiting class added the commitments of John Collins, Bryant Crawford, and Doral Moore. However, Wake Forest would have another disappointing season finishing the year 11–20 on the regular season and a 2–16 overall record in ACC play.

During Manning's third year at helm, despite losing seniors Codi Miller-McIntyre and Devin Thomas, Wake Forest started the 2016–17 season off very strong. Wake Forest entered the 2017 ACC tournament as the 10th seed and defeated Boston College in the first round of the ACC Tournament. On March 8, 2017, Wake Forest lost to Virginia Tech in the second round of the ACC Tournament. The team also earned a bid in the NCAA Tournament. Wake Forest finished 19–14 on the season and 9–9 in ACC play finishing 10th in the standings. Following the 2019–20 season, after six seasons with the team, Manning was relieved of his duties as head coach.

=== Steve Forbes era (2020–present) ===
On April 30, 2020, Steve Forbes was named as the new head coach for Wake Forest.

== Coaches ==
=== Current coaching staff ===
- Head Coach – Steve Forbes
- Asst. Coach – Jason Shay
- Asst. Coach – BJ McKie
- Asst. Coach – Demetris Nichols
- Director of Basketball Operations - Frank Davis

=== Former head coaches ===
- J. R. Crozier (1906–17)
- E. T. MacDonnell (1917–18)
- Irving Carlyle (1918–19)
- Bill Holding (1919–20, 1921–22)
- James L. White Jr. (1920–21)
- Phil Utley (1922–23)
- Hank Garrity (1923–25, simultaneously football coach)
- R. S. Hayes (1925–26, 1930–31)
- James A. Baldwin (1926–28)
- Pat Miller (1928–30)
- Fred Emmerson (1931–33)
- Murray Greason (1933–43, 1945–57; no team in 1944)
- Bones McKinney (1957–65)
- Jack Murdock (1965–66)
- Jack McCloskey (1966–72)
- Carl Tacy (1972–85)
- Bob Staak (1985–89)
- Dave Odom (1989–2001)
- Skip Prosser (2001–07)
- Dino Gaudio (2007–10)
- Jeff Bzdelik (2010–14)
- Danny Manning (2014–2020)

== Facilities ==
=== Game day ===
==== Lawrence Joel Veterans Memorial Coliseum ====
The Lawrence Joel Veterans Memorial Coliseum (also known as The Joel) is a 14,407-seat multi-purpose arena in Winston-Salem, North Carolina. It was named after Lawrence Joel, an Army medic from Winston-Salem who was awarded the Medal of Honor in 1967 for action in Vietnam on November 8, 1965. The memorial was designed by James Ford in New York, and includes the poem "The Fallen" engraved on an interior wall. It is home to Wake Forest's men's and women's basketball teams, and is adjacent to the Dixie Classic Fairgrounds. The arena replaced the old Winston-Salem War Memorial Coliseum, which was torn down for the LJVM Coliseum's construction.

Banners hang in the rafters commemorating past players' retired numbers (including Chris Paul, Tim Duncan, and Randolph Childress) and the late Skip Prosser. There are also banners recognizing the Demon Deacons' past NCAA and ACC successes. The arena is home to the Screamin' Demon student section. Wake Forest's black and gold tie-dyed apparel and "Zombie Nation" were both implemented upon Prosser's arrival at Wake Forest.

=== Practice ===
==== Miller Center ====
The Miller Center is the basketball team's on-campus home. It houses the players' locker rooms, team meeting rooms, coaches' offices, and the Dave Budd Practice Gym. The players utilize the Miller Center for practice, meetings, academic work, and relaxing with their teammates.

The Dave Budd Practice Gym has a full-length court, six stand alone baskets, bleacher seating and banners honoring some of the best players to ever don the black and gold. The locker room includes a separate player lounge which features multiple large flat screen TVs, multiple entertainment systems (Blu-ray, streaming software, and gaming systems) plus the latest video software, as well as dedicated equipment and training rooms. On August 7, 2018, Chris Paul donated $2.5 million to the Wake Forest basketball program.

==== Sutton Sports Performance Center/Shah Basketball Complex ====
The grand opening for the Sutton Sports Performance Center and the Shah Basketball Complex occurred in September, 2019 and provides Wake Forest with a state-of-the-art center for strength and conditioning and nutrition as well as providing space for coaches offices, team meeting rooms, and heritage areas that celebrate the success of Wake Forest's sports programs.

Ben Sutton ('80, JD '83) donated $15 million for the construction of the Sutton Sports Performance Center. The four-level, 87,000 square foot facility provides strength and conditioning facilities for all of Wake Forest's student-athletes. Preliminary site work began in October 2017 and was completed in September, 2019. The facility connects to McCreary Field House and the Miller Center. The Sutton Sports Performance Center provides more than 10,000 square feet of dedicated strength and conditioning equipment for football. There is also space for strength and conditioning equipment for men's and women's Olympic sports.

The third floor of the Sutton Sports Performance Center includes 17,000 square feet of meeting rooms, coaches offices and a heritage area for the men's and women's basketball program. The fourth floor has over 18,000 square feet for football coaches offices, team meeting rooms and a heritage area. Over 1,500 square feet comprises a customized nutrition center. The Shah Basketball Complex, named in honor of Mit Shah ('91) whose $5 million lead gift made the facility possible, includes 24,400 square feet that allows both the men's and women's basketball programs to have dedicated practice areas. The $12 million project features the addition a regulation court that allows both programs to have interconnected practice areas featuring two practice courts and a total of 13 baskets. The Shah Complex features 6,000 square feet of strength and conditioning equipment for both the men's and women's basketball teams.

== Postseason ==
=== NCAA tournament results ===
The Demon Deacons have appeared in the NCAA tournament 23 times. Their combined record is 28–23.

Year	Seed	Round	Opponent	Result
1939		Elite Eight	Ohio State	L 52–64
1953		Sweet Sixteen; Regional 3rd Place	Holy Cross; Lebanon Valley	L 71–79; W 91–71
1961		First Round; Sweet Sixteen; Elite Eight	St. John's; St. Bonaventure; Saint Joseph's	W 97–74; W 78–73; L 86–96
1962		First Round; Sweet Sixteen; Elite Eight; Final Four; National 3rd Place	Yale; Saint Joseph's; Villanova; Ohio State; UCLA	W 92–82^{OT} W 96–85^{OT} W 79–69; L 68–84; W 82–80
1977		First Round; Sweet Sixteen; Elite Eight	Arkansas; Southern Illinois; Marquette	W 86–80; W 86–81; L 68–82
1981	#4	Second Round	#5 Boston College	L 64–67
1982	#7	First Round; Second Round	#10 Old Dominion #2 Memphis State	W 74–57; L 55–56
1984	#4	Second Round; Sweet Sixteen; Elite Eight	#5 Kansas #1 DePaul #2 Houston	W 69–59; W 73–71^{OT} L 63–68
1991	#5	First Round; Second Round	#12 Louisiana Tech #4 Alabama	W 71–65; L 88–96
1992	#9	First Round	#8 Louisville	L 58–81
1993	#5	First Round; Second Round; Sweet Sixteen	#12 Chattanooga #4 Iowa #1 Kentucky	W 81–58; W 84–78; L 69–103
1994	#5	First Round; Second Round	#12 College of Charleston #4 Kansas	W 68–58; L 58–69
1995	#1	First Round; Second Round; Sweet Sixteen	#16 North Carolina A&T #9 Saint Louis #4 Oklahoma State	W 79–47; W 64–59; L 66–71
1996	#2	First Round; Second Round; Sweet Sixteen; Elite Eight	#15 Northeast Louisiana #10 Texas #6 Louisville #1 Kentucky	W 64–50; W 65–62; W 60–59; L 63–83
1997	#3	First Round; Second Round	#14 Saint Mary's #6 Stanford	W 68–46; L 66–72
2001	#7	First Round	#10 Butler	L 63–79
2002	#7	First Round; Second Round	#10 Pepperdine #2 Oregon	W 83–74; L 87–92
2003	#2	First Round; Second Round	#15 East Tennessee State #10 Auburn	W 76–73; L 62–68
2004	#4	First Round; Second Round; Sweet Sixteen	#13 VCU #12 Manhattan #1 Saint Joseph's	W 79–78; W 84–80; L 80–84
2005	#2	First Round; Second Round	#15 Chattanooga #7 West Virginia	W 70–54; L 105–111^{2OT}
2009	#4	First Round	#13 Cleveland State	L 69–84
2010	#9	First Round; Second Round	#8 Texas #1 Kentucky	W 81–80^{OT} L 60–90
2017	#11	First Four	#11 Kansas State	L 88–95

=== NIT results ===
The Demon Deacons have appeared in the National Invitation Tournament (NIT) nine times. Their combined record is 14–8. They were NIT champions in 2000.

Year	Round	Opponent	Result
1983	First Round; Second Round; Quarterfinals; Semifinals	Murray State; Vanderbilt; South Carolina; Fresno State	W 87–70; W 75–68; W 78–61; L 62–86
1985	First Round	South Florida	L 66–77
1998	First Round; Second Round	UNC Wilmington; Vanderbilt	W 56–52; L 72–68
1999	First Round; Second Round	Alabama; Xavier	W 73–57; L 87–76
2000	First Round; Second Round; Quarterfinals; Semifinals; Final	Vanderbilt; New Mexico; California; NC State; Notre Dame	W 83–68; W 72–65; W 76–59; W 62–59; W 71–61
2006	First Round	Minnesota	L 58–73
2022	First Round; Second Round; Quarterfinals	Towson; VCU; Texas A&M	W 74–64; W 80–74; L 52–67
2024	First Round; Second Round	Appalachian State; Georgia	W 87–76; L 66–72
2026	First Round; Second Round	Navy; Illinois State	W 82–72; L 75–78

== Awards and honors ==
=== Retired numbers ===
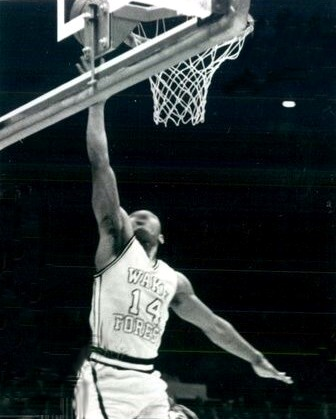
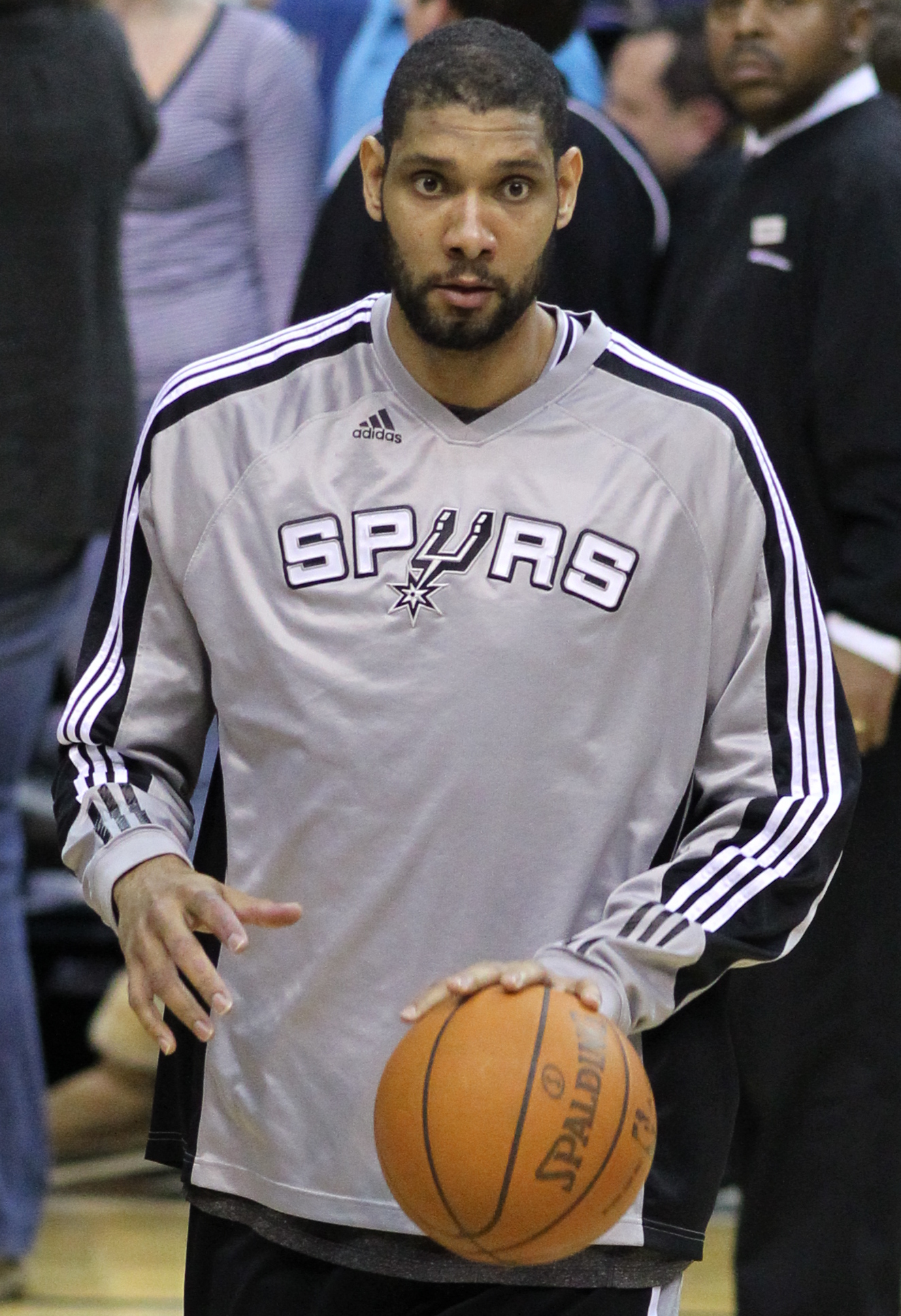
Muggsy Bogues (left) and Tim Duncan, some Demon Deacons to have their numbers retired

Wake Forest Demon Deacons retired numbers
No.	Player	Pos.	Tenure	Ref.
3	Chris Paul	PG	2003–2005	
5	Josh Howard	SF	1999–2003	
12	Charlie Davis	PG	1968–1971	
14	Muggsy Bogues	PG	1983–1987	
15	Skip Brown	PG	1973–1977	
21	Tim Duncan	PF	1993–1997	
22	Randolph Childress	PG	1991–1995	
24	Dickie Hemric	PF	1951–1955	
32	Rod Griffin	PF	1974–1978	
50	Len Chappell	PF	1959–1962	
54	Rodney Rogers	PF	1990–1993	

=== Coaches honored ===
Head coaches that have been honored with their names hanging on the Coliseum rafters:

Name	Tenure	Honored
Skip Prosser	2001–2007	2018
Dave Odom	1989–2001	2020

=== Awards ===
National Collegiate Basketball Hall of Fame:

- Billy Packer – 2008
- Tim Duncan – 2017

John R. Wooden Award:

- Tim Duncan – 1997

Frances Pomeroy Naismith Award:

- Muggsy Bogues

McDonald's All-Americans

- Rodney Rogers - 1990
- Eric Williams - 2002
- Chris Paul - 2003
- Al-Farouq Aminu - 2010
- Hunter Sallis - 2021

ACC Coach of the Year:

- Murray Greason – 1956
- Bones McKinney – 1960, 1961
- Dave Odom – 1991, 1994, 1995
- Skip Prosser – 2003
- Steve Forbes – 2022

ACC Player of the Year:

- Dickie Hemric – 1954, 1955
- Len Chappell – 1961, 1962
- Charlie Davis – 1971
- Rod Griffin – 1977
- Rodney Rogers – 1993
- Tim Duncan – 1996, 1997
- Josh Howard – 2003
- Alondes Williams – 2022

ACC Rookie of the Year:

- Rodney Rogers – 1991
- Robert O'Kelley – 1998
- Chris Paul – 2004

ACC Most Improved Player of the Year

- John Collins – 2017
- Juke Harris – 2026

=== All-Americans ===
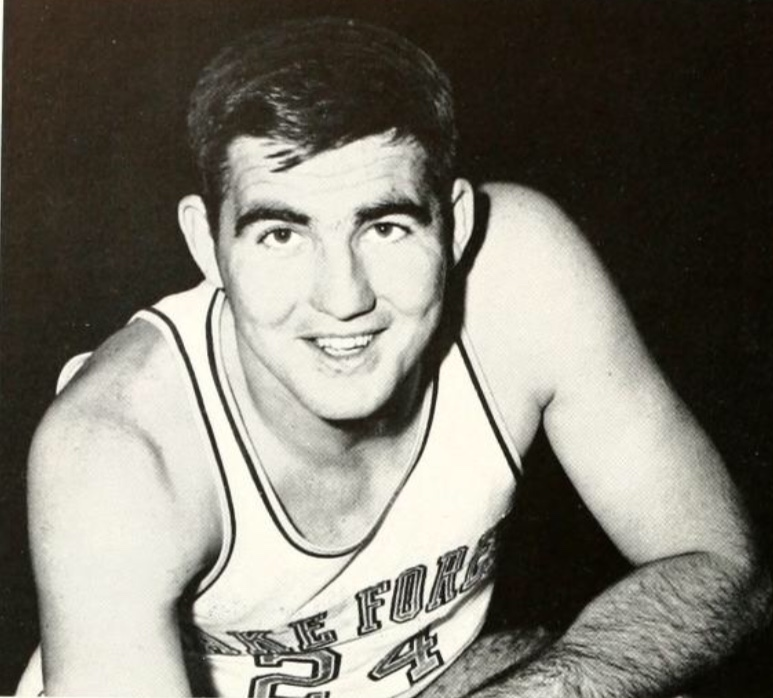
Dickie Hemric was a two-time All-American, in 1954 and 1955

Year	Player(s)
1954	Dickie Hemric
1955	Dickie Hemric
1957	Jackie Murdock
1961	Len Chappell
1962	Len Chappell
1971	Charlie Davis
1977	Skip Brown, Rod Griffin
1978	Rod Griffin
1981	Frank Johnson
1993	Rodney Rogers
1995	Randolph Childress, Tim Duncan
1996	Tim Duncan
1997	Tim Duncan
2003	Josh Howard
2005	Chris Paul
2009	Jeff Teague
2010	Al-Farouq Aminu

=== All-ACC players ===
- The players are all first team All-ACC, unless otherwise noted

Year	Player(s)
1954	Dickie Hemric, Lowell Davis*
1955	Dickie Hemric, Lowell Davis*
1956	Lowell Davis, Jackie Murdock*
1957	Jackie Murdock, Jack Williams, Ernie Wiggins*
1958	Dave Budd*
1960	Len Chappell, Dave Budd*, Billy Packer*
1961	Len Chappell, Billy Packer
1962	Len Chappell, Dave Wiedeman*,
1963	Dave Wiedeman
1964	Frank Christie, Butch Hassell*, Ronny Watts*
1965	Bob Leonard, Ronny Watts*
1966	Bob Leonard, Paul Long*
1967	Paul Long
1969	Charlie Davis
1970	Charlie Davis
1971	Charlie Davis
1973	Tony Byers*
1974	Tony Byers*
1975	Skip Brown
1976	Skip Brown*, Rod Griffin*
1977	Skip Brown, Rod Griffin
1978	Rod Griffin, Frank Johnson*
1979	Frank Johnson*
1981	Frank Johnson
1982	Jim Johnstone*
1984	Kenny Green*, Anthony Teachey*
1985	Kenny Green*
1987	Tyrone Bogues
1988	Sam Ivy*
1991	Rodney Rogers*
1992	Rodney Rogers
1993	Rodney Rogers, Randolph Childress*
1994	Randolph Childress, Trelonnie Owens**
1995	Randolph Childress, Tim Duncan
1996	Tim Duncan
1997	Tim Duncan, Tony Rutland**
1999	Robert O'Kelley*
2000	Darius Songaila**
2001	Josh Howard*
2002	Darius Songaila*, Josh Howard**
2003	Josh Howard, Vytas Danelius*
2004	Justin Gray, Chris Paul**
2005	Chris Paul, Justin Gray*, Eric Williams*
2006	Justin Gray*, Eric Williams**
2007	Kyle Visser**
2008	James Johnson**
2009	Jeff Teague*, James Johnson**
2010	Al-Farouq Aminu*, Ishmael Smith*
2012	C. J. Harris**
2013	C. J. Harris**
2017	John Collins
2022	Alondes Williams, Jake LaRavia*
2023	Tyree Appleby
2024	Hunter Sallis
2025	Hunter Sallis
2026	Juke Harris*

- (*) Denotes 2nd Team All-ACC
- (**) Denotes 3rd Team All-ACC

== Players in the NBA draft ==
Year	Player	Round #	Pick #	Overall #	Team
1955	Dickie Hemric	2nd	4	10	Boston Celtics
1960	Dave Budd	2nd	2	10	New York Knicks
1962	Len Chappell	1st	4	4	Syracuse Nationals
1963	Bob Woollard	7th	1	54	New York Knicks
1965	Ron Watts	2nd	9	17	Boston Celtics
1967	Paul Long	5th	2	45	Detroit Pistons
1970	Dickie Walker	11th	7	177	Buffalo Braves
1971	Gil McGregor	6th	4	89	Cincinnati Royals
1971	Charlie Davis	8th	1	120	Cleveland Cavaliers
1972	Rich Habegger	15th	1	188	Portland Trail Blazers
1973	Eddie Payne	11th	2	167	Portland Trail Blazers
1974	Tony Byers	5th	9	81	Buffalo Braves
1976	Daryl Peterson	6th	12	98	Seattle SuperSonics
1977	Skip Brown	3rd	12	56	Boston Celtics
1977	Jerry Schellenberg	3rd	17	61	Washington Bullets
1978	Rod Griffin	1st	17	17	Denver Nuggets
1978	Leroy McDonald	4th	10	76	San Diego Clippers
1981	Frank Johnson	1st	11	11	Washington Bullets
1982	Guy Morgan	2nd	17	40	Indiana Pacers
1982	Jim Johnstone	3rd	5	51	Kansas City Kings
1982	Mike Helms	7th	16	154	Houston Rockets
1983	Alvis Rogers	6th	14	130	Kansas City Kings
1984	Danny Young	2nd	15	39	Seattle SuperSonics
1984	Anthony Teachey	2nd	16	40	Dallas Mavericks
1985	Kenny Green	1st	12	12	Washington Bullets
1985	Delaney Rudd	4th	13	83	Utah Jazz
1987	Tyrone Bogues	1st	12	12	Washington Bullets
1992	Chris King	2nd	18	45	Seattle SuperSonics
1993	Rodney Rogers	1st	9	9	Denver Nuggets
1995	Randolph Childress	1st	19	19	Detroit Pistons
1997	Tim Duncan	1st	1	1	San Antonio Spurs
2002	Darius Songaila	2nd	21	49	Boston Celtics
2003	Josh Howard	1st	29	29	Dallas Mavericks
2005	Chris Paul	1st	4	4	New Orleans Hornets
2009	James Johnson	1st	16	16	Chicago Bulls
2009	Jeff Teague	1st	19	19	Atlanta Hawks
2010	Al-Farouq Aminu	1st	8	8	Los Angeles Clippers
2017	John Collins	1st	19	19	Atlanta Hawks
2022	Jake LaRavia	1st	19	19	Minnesota Timberwolves

== Notable players ==
=== Demon Deacons in the Olympics ===
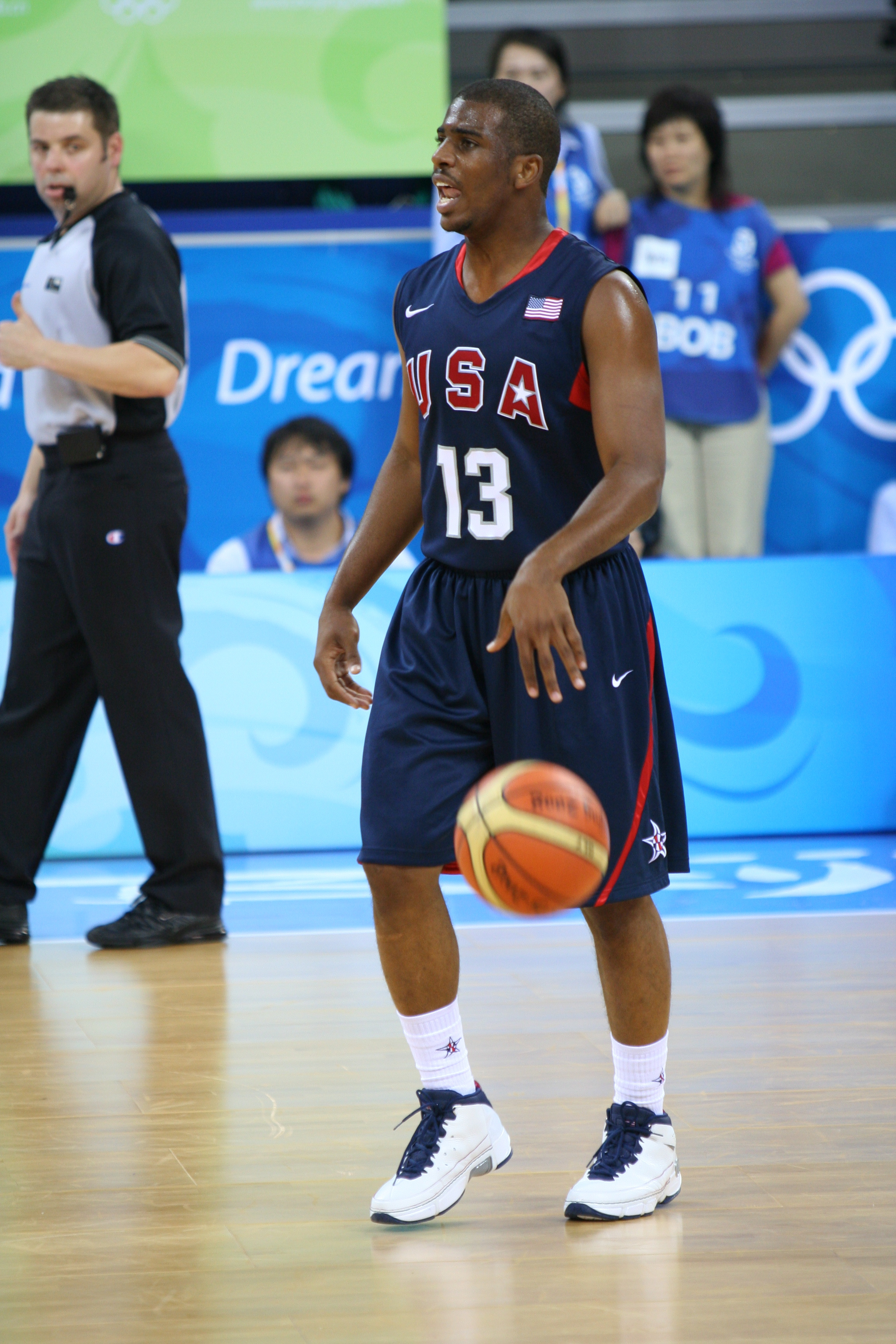
Chris Paul with Team USA in 2008

Name	Year	City	Position	Country	Medal
Darius Songalia	2000	Sydney	Forward	Lithuania	Bronze medal
Tim Duncan	2004	Athens	Forward	United States	Bronze medal
Chris Paul	2008	Beijing	Guard	United States	Gold medal
Chris Paul	2012	London	Guard	United States	Gold medal
Al-Farouq Aminu	2012	London	Forward	Nigeria	

=== Naismith Memorial Basketball Hall of Fame ===
Name	Position	Year
Tim Duncan	PF	2020

=== NBA Champions ===
Name	Team	Championships
Tim Duncan	San Antonio Spurs	5
Dickie Hemric	Boston Celtics	1
Ron Watts	Boston Celtics	1
Rusty LaRue	Chicago Bulls	1
Jeff Teague	Milwaukee Bucks	1
Ish Smith	Denver Nuggets	1

=== Current NBA players ===
- John Collins – Detroit Pistons
- Jake LaRavia – Los Angeles Lakers
- James Johnson – Indiana Pacers

=== Current NBA G League players ===
- Hunter Sallis – San Diego Clippers
- Alondes Williams – Capital City Go-Go

=== Current Non-NBA professional players ===
- Tyree Appleby - Limoges CSP of the LNB Pro A
- Chaundee Brown Jr. – London Lions of Super League Basketball
- Brandon Childress - Hakro Merlins Crailsheim of the German Basketball Bundesliga
- Bryant Crawford - Hapoel Ironi Eilat of the Israeli Basketball Premier League
- Ian DuBose - Caledonia Gladiators of the British Basketball League
- C. J. Harris (born 1991) - in the Israeli Basketball Premier League
- Cameron Hildreth – Bàsquet Girona of the Spanish Liga ACB
- Jaylen Hoard (born 1999) - French-American player for Hapoel Tel Aviv of the Israeli Basketball Premier League
- Bobi Klintman – Virtus Bologna of the Italian Lega Basket Serie A (LBA) and the EuroLeague
- Codi Miller-McIntyre - Saski Baskonia of the Spanish Liga ACB and the EuroLeague
- Dinos Mitoglou - Panathinaikos Greece
- Devin Thomas – Ostioneros de Guaymas of the CIBACOPA

=== All-time leaders ===
==== Points ====
Rank	Player	Years	Points
1.	Dickie Hemric	1951–55	2,587
2.	Randolph Childress	1990–95	2,208
3.	Len Chappell	1959–62	2,165
4.	Tim Duncan	1993–97	2,117
5.	Skip Brown	1973–77	2,034
6.	Rod Griffin	1974–78	1,985
7.	Charlie Davis	1968–71	1,970
8.	Justin Gray	2002–06	1,946
9.	Robert O'Kelley	1997–01	1,885
10.	Darius Songaila	1998–02	1,859
11.	Josh Howard	1999–03	1,765
12.	Frank Johnson	1976–81	1,749
13.	Eric Williams	2002–06	1,738
14.	Chris King	1988–92	1,721
15.	Rodney Rogers	1990–93	1,720
16.	Travis McKie	2010–14	1,687
17.	Bob Leonard	1963–66	1,637
18.	C. J. Harris	2009–13	1,613
19.	Lefty Davis	1952–56	1,564
20.	Sam Ivy	1986–90	1,551

==== Rebounds ====
Rank	Player	Years	Rebounds
1.	Dickie Hemric	1951–55	1,802
2.	Tim Duncan	1993–97	1,570
3.	Len Chappell	1959–62	1,213
4.	Devin Thomas	2012–16	1,061
5.	Rod Griffin	1974–78	947
6.	Anthony Teachey	1980–84	869
7.	Eric Williams	2002–06	858
8.	Gil McGregor	1968–71	850
9.	Josh Howard	1999–03	836
10.	Ron Watts	1962–65	833
11.	Travis McKie	2010–14	816
12.	Darius Songaila	1998–02	813
13.	Jack Williams	1953–57	751
14.	Jamaal Levy	2001–05	743
15.	Rafael Vidaurreta	1997–01	727
16.	Rodney Rogers	1990–93	705
17.	Guy Morgan	1978–82	703
18.	Sam Ivy	1986–90	695
19.	Chris King	1988–92	690
20.	Dave Budd	1957–60	682

==== Assists ====
Rank	Player	Years	Assists
1.	Muggsy Bogues	1983–87	781
2.	Ish Smith	2006–10	612
3.	Skip Brown	1973–77	579
4.	Derrick McQueen	1988–92	575
5.	Danny Young	1980–84	493
6.	Randolph Childress	1990–95	472
7.	Bryant Crawford	2015–18	467
8.	Frank Johnson	1976–81	460
9.	Brandon Childress	2016–20	443
10.	Codi Miller-McIntyre	2012–16	441

==== Steals ====
Rank	Player	Years	Steals
1.	Muggsy Bogues	1983–87	275
2.	Josh Howard	1999–03	215
3.	Frank Johnson	1976–81	204
4.	Skip Brown	1973–77	195
5.	Danny Young	1980–84	194
6.	Randolph Childress	1990–95	180
7.	Chris Paul	2003–05	160
8.	Ish Smith	2006–10	153
9.	Bryant Crawford	2015–18	149
10.	Rodney Rogers	1990–93	146

==== Blocks ====
Rank	Player	Years	Blocks
1.	Tim Duncan	1993–97	481
2.	Anthony Teachey	1980–84	203
3.	Larry Harrison	1975–79	188
4.	Guy Morgan	1978–82	182
5.	Ty Walker	2008–12	144
5.	Devin Thomas	2012–16	144
7.	Josh Howard	1999–03	143
8.	Antwan Scott	1998–02	140
9.	Kyle Visser	2003–07	116
10.	Chas McFarland	2006–10	114
