= Rod Griffin (basketball) =

American basketball player

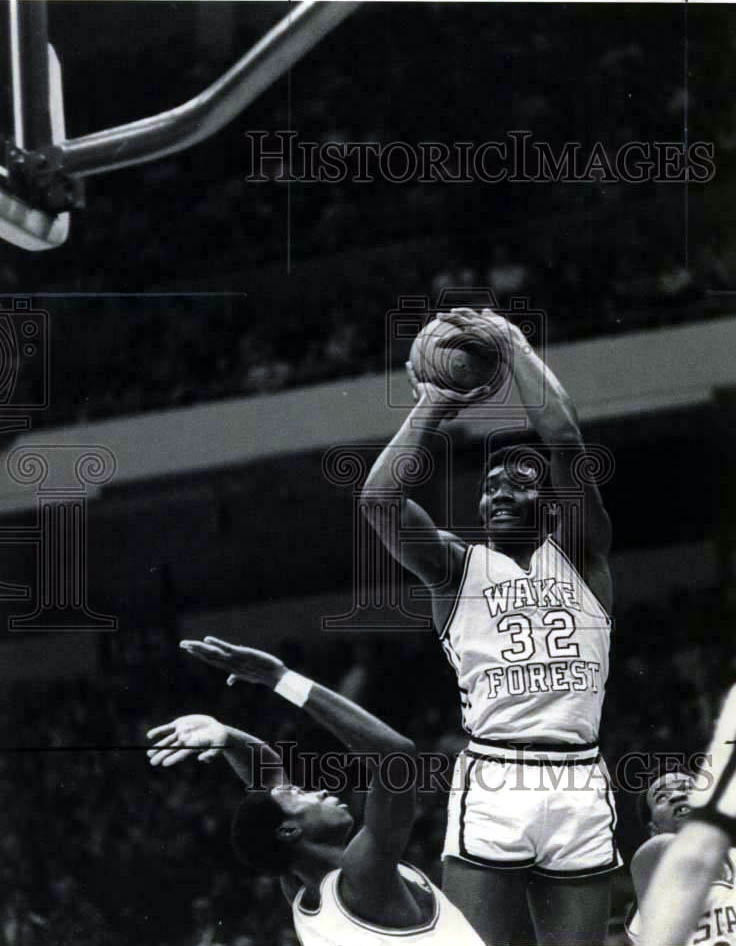
- Griffin with Wake Forest in 1977

Personal information
- Born: June 18, 1956 (age 70) Fairmont, North Carolina, U.S.
- Listed height: 6 ft 7 in (2.01 m)
- Listed weight: 215 lb (98 kg)

Career information
- High school: Fairmont (Fairmont, North Carolina)
- College: Wake Forest (1974–1978)
- NBA draft: 1978: 1st round, 17th overall pick
- Drafted by: Denver Nuggets
- Playing career: 1978–1993
- Position: Power forward

Career highlights
- 2× Consensus second-team All-American (1977, 1978); ACC Player of the Year (1977); 2× First-team All-ACC (1977, 1978); Second-team All-ACC (1976); No. 32 retired by Wake Forest Demon Deacons
- Stats at Basketball Reference

Rod Griffin (born June 18, 1956) is an American former professional basketball player. The 6'7" power forward spent four seasons playing at Wake Forest University, playing for the Wake Forest Demon Deacons. He was the 1977 ACC Player of the year. He was selected in the first round (17th pick overall) of the 1978 NBA draft by the Denver Nuggets. He played 13 years in Italy and in 1997 he became an Italian citizen. In Forlì supporters called him "Sindaco", the Italian word for Mayor.

== Sources ==
- Article on draft
- Article on Griffin waiver
