= Eric Williams (basketball, born 1984) =

American basketball player

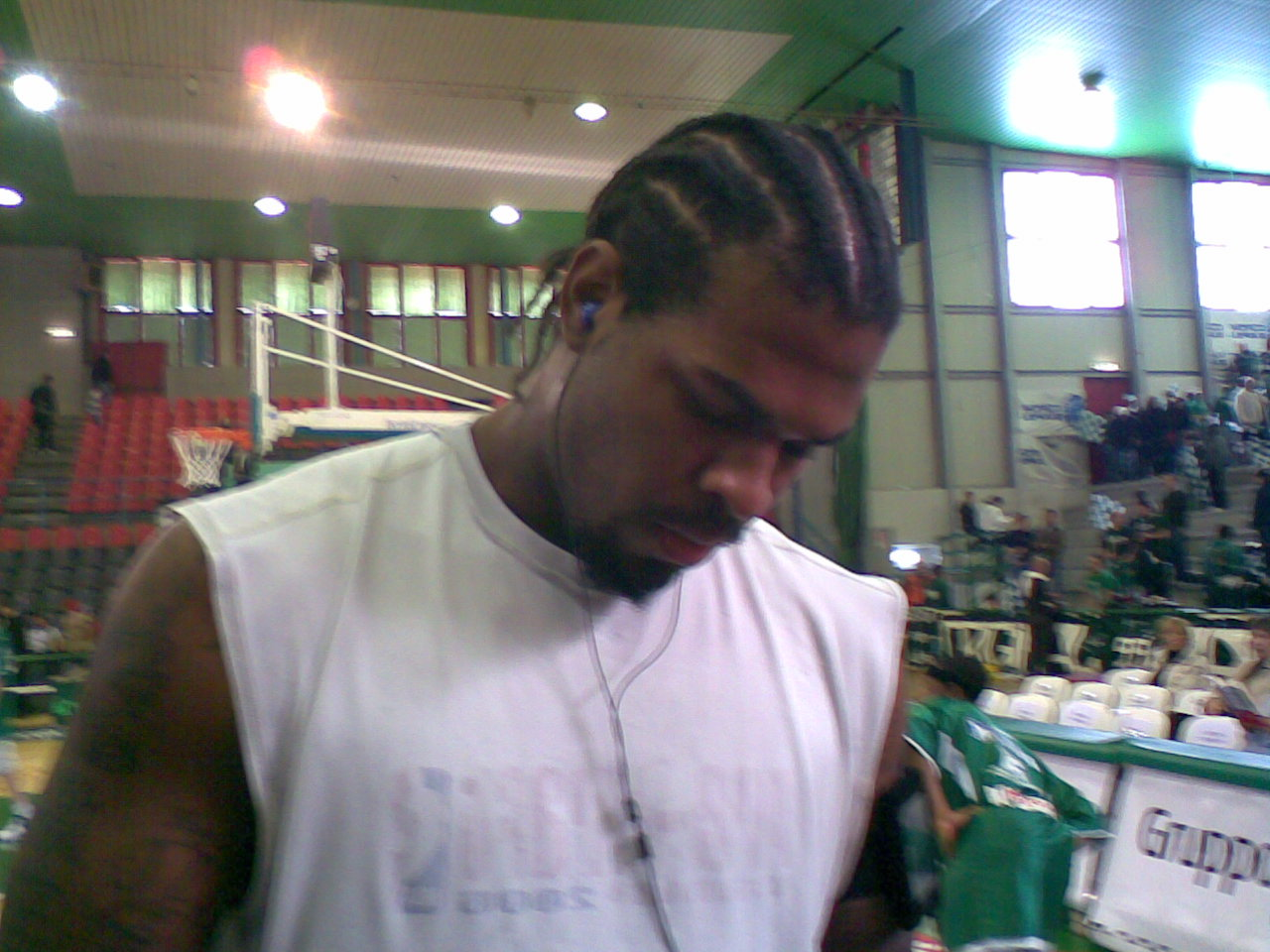
- Williams, circa 2008

Personal information
- Born: March 26, 1984 (age 42) Frankfurt, West Germany
- Listed height: 6 ft 9 in (2.06 m)
- Listed weight: 280 lb (127 kg)

Career information
- High school: Wake Forest-Rolesville (Wake Forest, North Carolina)
- College: Wake Forest (2002–2006)
- NBA draft: 2006: undrafted
- Playing career: 2006–2018
- Position: Center

Career history
- 2006–2007: Cantù
- 2007–2009: Avellino
- 2009–2010: VL Pesaro
- 2010–2011: JuveCaserta
- 2011–2012: BC Astana
- 2012: Reyer Venezia
- 2013: Guangzhou Liu Sui
- 2013–2014: Limoges CSP
- 2014–2015: Cantù
- 2015–2016: MKS Dąbrowa Górnicza
- 2016–2017: Lugano Tigers
- 2017: Hebraica Macabi
- 2017–2018: Lions de Genève

Career highlights
- Kazakhstan league Player of the Year (2012); Kazakhstan league champion (2012); Kazakhstan cup winner (2012); Italian Cup winner (2008); AP Honorable mention All-American (2005); Second-team All-ACC (2005); Third-team All-ACC (2006); McDonald's All-American (2002); Third-team Parade All-American (2002)

Eric Bernard Williams Jr. (born March 26, 1984) is an American-Bulgarian former professional basketball player. One of the top prospects of the 2002 high school class, he played college basketball at Wake Forest where he was a 4-year starter. Williams went undrafted in the 2006 NBA draft and moved to Europe to play professionally, mainly in Italy, France, Poland and Switzerland, but he also had brief stints in Kazakhstan, China and Uruguay too.

== High school career ==
Williams was born in Frankfurt, Germany to parents Eric and Debra (née Certain), who were both athletes at Livingstone College: his father was a football player, while his mother played basketball. Williams grew up in Chicago, Illinois, and started playing basketball at age 9; when his parents separated, Williams and his mother moved to Wake Forest, North Carolina when he was in eighth grade. Williams enrolled at Wake Forest-Rolesville High school, where he played in the varsity team for 4 years, coached by Chuck Hess. He chose to wear jersey number 31 for the number of rebounds his mother once recorded in a single game, and as a freshman he averaged 10 points, 7 rebounds, 2 assists and 2 steals. As a sophomore in high school he weighed 313 pounds and posted averages of 15 points, 9 rebounds, 4 assists and 2 steals per game.

Williams was already being recruited by NCAA Division I colleges in his junior year as a nationally ranked prospect; he averaged 22 points, 15 rebounds, 3 blocks, 5 assists and 3 steals, shooting 85% from the field, and during a game he broke a rim. Wake Forest-Rolesville lost in the sectional final game against Leesville Road High School, the team of 2001 North Carolina Mr. Basketball Anthony Richardson. Before his senior season Williams lost a significant amount of weight, reaching 280 pounds: he recorded averages of 28 points, 14 rebounds, 6 assists, 3 blocks and 3 steals while being named Conference Player of the Year and Wake County Player of the Year, and was an all-state selection. On December 4, 2001, against Northern Durham he shot 18 for 18 from the field, a North Carolina high school basketball record, tying Stuart Davis of Robbinsville who shot 15 for 15 in 1990. He was ranked the 11th center in the nation by ESPN and was in the top-40 of several national rankings. He also finished in 2nd place for the Mr. Basketball award, behind Shavlik Randolph and ahead of Curtis Withers and Chris Paul.

His successful senior year earned him a selection as a McDonald's All-American and in the Parade All-America Third Team. In the 2002 McDonald's game, which was played in New York City, he scored 9 points, shooting 4/10 from the field and 1/4 from the free throw line, recorded 2 assists, 1 steal and 1 block, and he was the top rebounder of the game with 13 rebounds in 14 minutes of play.

== College career ==
=== Freshman season ===
Williams was recruited since his junior year in high school, and received interest from Wake Forest, Clemson, NC State and North Carolina. He signed for Wake Forest in July 2001, becoming the third recruit signed under newly appointed coach Skip Prosser. He chose a degree in sociology and jersey number 31, the same he wore in high school. His official debut was on November 27, 2002, against Yale, and he recorded 14 points and 4 steals. He scored a then career-high 20 points on March 21, 2003, against East Tennessee State in the NCAA tournament. He started all 31 games he played, the third best result for a freshman in Wake Forest history, but during the season he was often in foul trouble, leading the team in fouls. He also led the team in field goal percentage, and was the fifth best scorer with 8.7 points per game.

=== Sophomore season ===
For his sophomore year, coach Prosser increased Williams' minutes, and the center improved his averages to 12.4 points, 5.6 rebounds, 0.6 assists and 0.7 blocks. He started 24 of his 31 games, recorded a career-high 25 points against Indiana on December 2, 2003, and was named the ACC Player of the Week after his 24-point performance against North Carolina on December 20, 2003, when Wake Forest won after a triple-overtime. He still had issues with excessive fouling, but ranked third in the team in scoring behind Justin Gray and Chris Paul, second in blocks, and again led the team in field goal percentage, shooting .546.

=== Junior season ===
Williams started his junior year with an improved physical condition, having lost weight, and reached 271 pounds, a significant drop from his freshman weight of 340. He was also invited by Kelvin Sampson to participate in a training camp with the Under-20 USA national team, but was ultimately unable to join the team due to illness. He started 32 out of 33 games and recorded a new career-high with 29 points against Cincinnati on January 22, 2005, and on February 2 against Duke he broke a Wake Forest record for offensive rebounds in a single game with 11. On January 31 he received another ACC Player of the Week award; he led the entire ACC conference in field goal percentage with .630, which was also good for third place in the entire Division I. The Demon Deacons reached the second round of the NCAA tournament, where they were eliminated by West Virginia despite a 23-points, 12-rebounds performance by Williams. He also managed to improve on fouling, recording less fouls compared to his previous 2 years, and fouled out only twice in the whole season. At the end of the season he was named in the All-ACC second team and was an honorable mention AP All-American.

=== Senior season ===
Williams initially entered his name in the 2005 NBA draft and participated in pre-draft workouts, but withdrew in April without having hired an agent, something that allowed him to come back to Wake Forest for his senior year. In his last season of college basketball Williams was again in the starting five (34 out of 34 games), averaging 32.6 minutes. He made his debut in the first game of the season on November 10, 2005, against Mississippi Valley State and posted 22 points and 9 rebounds. On January 11, 2006, he recorded 22 points and 20 rebounds (career high) against Clemson. His season averages were all career-highs: 16.3 points, 8.9 rebounds, 1 assists, 1.3 steals and 1.1 blocks; he also led the ACC in field goal percentage with .619, and was third in the conference for rebounding average. At the end of the year he was named in the All-ACC third team.

When he ended his career at Wake Forest he ranked 13th for points scored with 1,738, 6th in total rebounds with 858, and his 121 career starts ranked second all-time in Wake Forest history behind only Tim Duncan.

=== College statistics ===
Year	Team	GP	GS	MPG	FG%	3P%	FT%	RPG	APG	SPG	BPG	PPG
2002–03	Wake Forest	31	31	20.1	.547	.000	.621	4.1	0.6	0.7	0.6	8.7
2003–04	Wake Forest	31	24	24.9	.546	.000	.682	5.6	0.6	0.8	0.7	12.4
2004–05	Wake Forest	33	32	28.8	.630	.000	.569	7.7	0.5	1.2	1.1	16.1
2005–06	Wake Forest	34	34	32.6	.619	.000	.493	8.9	1.0	1.3	1.1	16.3
Career		129	121	26.8	.593	.000	.574	6.7	0.7	1.0	0.9	13.5

== Professional career ==
After his final year in college, Williams was automatically eligible for the 2006 NBA draft, and during the NBA Draft Combine he was measured at 6 ft 7.25 in without shoes, 6 ft 8.75 with shoes with a 7 ft 4.25 in wingspan and a weight of 285 lbs. He was not drafted by an NBA franchise, but he was drafted by the Yakima SunKings in the 6th round of the 2006 CBA Draft (61st overall). He joined the New Jersey Nets for the 2006 Orlando Summer League, playing in five games (2 starts) averaging 10.2 points and 5.6 rebounds in 17.3 minutes per game during the event. He did not make the Nets roster for the 2006–07 NBA season, and signed for Italian team Pallacanestro Cantù. In his first season in Serie A, he played 37 games, averaging 9.9 points and 5.7 rebounds in 18.9 minutes, shooting .633 from the field. In 2007 he took part in the Las Vegas Summer League with the Phoenix Suns, playing 4 games with averages of 1.8 points and 2.8 rebounds in 9 minutes. In July 2007 he signed for another Italian team, Avellino, where he averaged 12.8 points and 8.1 rebounds in his first season, and 8.0 points and 4.7 rebounds in his second season. In 2008 he won the Italian Basketball Cup, and the following season he participated in the 2008–09 Euroleague, playing all 10 games and posting averages of 9.9 points and 5.1 rebounds.

In 2009 he left Avellino for Libertas Pesaro, another team in the Italian top level, and he played one season there averaging a career-best 14.2 points and 8.1 rebounds in 26.7 minutes per game: with Pesaro he took part in the 2009–10 FIBA EuroChallenge, finishing in fourth place. He played 15 games in the competition, posting averages of 11.9 points and 5.7 rebounds. In the summer of 2010 Williams obtained a Bulgarian passport, and became a Bulgarian national in October, after coming back from a training camp with the Portland Trail Blazers. The Bulgarian passport made him an EU citizen, thus making easier for him to sign for European clubs. In 2010 he signed for another Italian team, JuveCaserta, where he played in Serie A and in the 2010–11 Eurocup Basketball. In 2011 he left Italy for Kazakhstan, and joined BC Astana, signing a 1-year contract. Williams had a successful season with Astana, where he won both the national cup and the league title, was named "best center" in both competitions, and won the Kazakhstan player of the year award. In 16 games in Kazakhstan he averaged 13.1 points and 6.1 rebounds.

He went back to Italy in June 2012, signing for Reyer Venezia but only stayed there for 6 months, being released in the last days of December 2012. He then joined Chinese team Guangzhou Liu Sui, which played in the National Basketball League, and averaged 14.8 points, 7.4 rebounds and 1.1 steals in 9 appearances. He came back to Europe signing for Limoges, a French team, and he played in the LNB Pro A until February 2014 averaging 2.6 points and 2.1 rebounds in limited playing time. He signed for Cantù again in July 2014, and played a total of 35 games with the team, averaging 7.9 points and 4.7 rebounds in 20.8 minutes per game. He also had the chance to compete again at continental level, taking part in the 2014–15 Eurocup.

He signed for Steaua București on August 22, 2015, but did not play any official game with the team, and was released on September 6. He then joined Polish team MKS Dąbrowa Górnicza and played the entire 2015–16 season there, posting averages of 10.5 points and 5.1 rebounds per game. In 2016 he moved to Switzerland, signing for the Lugano Tigers. In 2017 he transferred to Uruguayan club Hebraica Macabi to play in the 2017 Liga Sudamericana de Básquetbol. After the experience in South America he went back to Switzerland, this time to the Lions de Genève. In the summer of 2018 he joined Wake the Nation, a team of former Wake Forest University alumni that competes in The Basketball Tournament.
