= Ty Walker (basketball) =

American basketball player

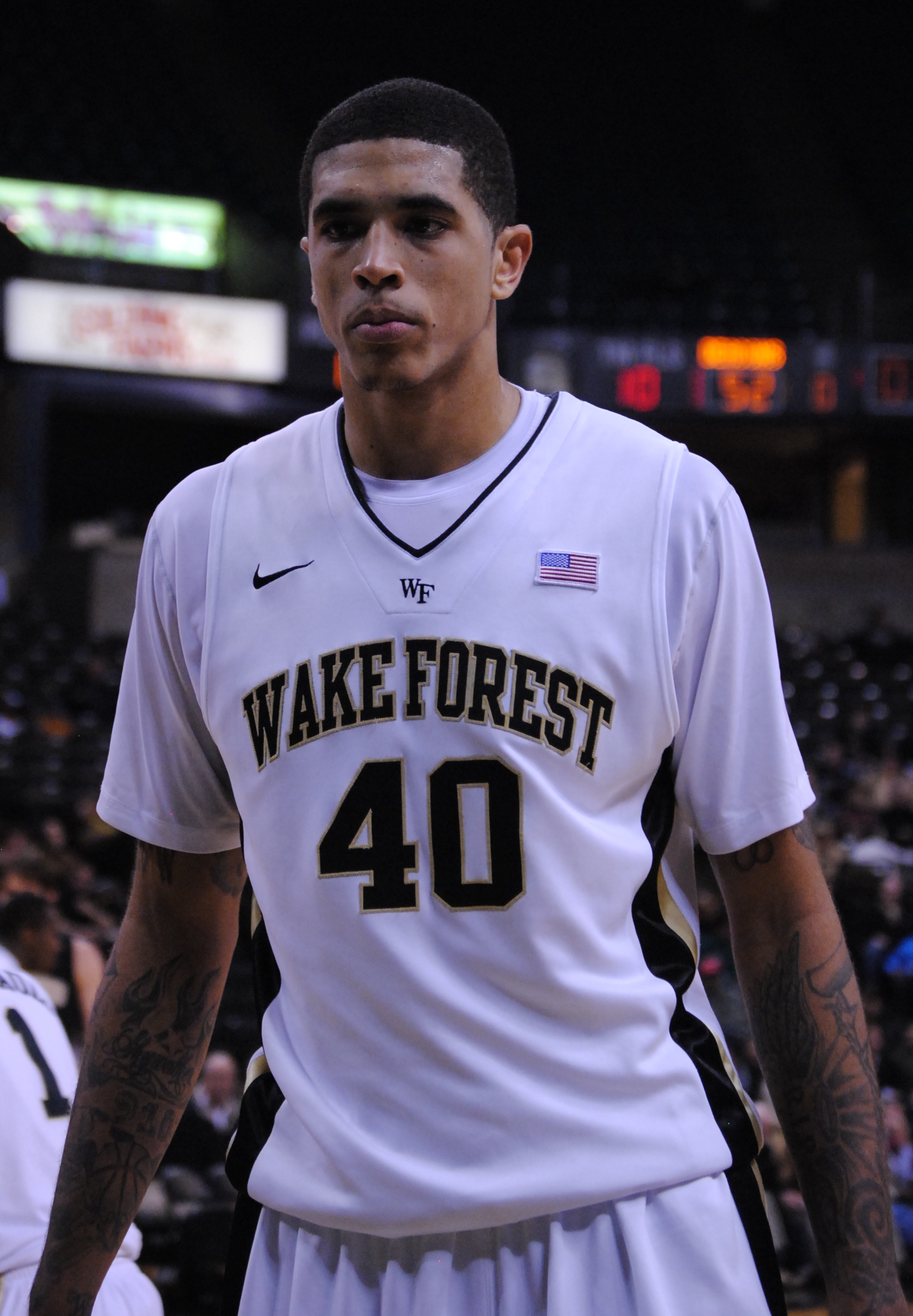

Personal information
- Born: August 7, 1989 (age 37) Columbus, Ohio, U.S.
- Listed height: 213 cm (7 ft 0 in)
- Listed weight: 104 kg (229 lb)

Career information
- High school: New Hanover (Wilmington, North Carolina)
- College: Wake Forest (2008–2012)
- NBA draft: 2012: undrafted
- Playing career: 2012–2023
- Position: Center

Career history
- 2012: Hong Kong Xinlibao Bulls
- 2012: Limoges CSP
- 2013: SKK Kotwica Kołobrzeg
- 2013–2014: Maine Red Claws
- 2014: Erie BayHawks
- 2014–2015: Akita Northern Happinets
- 2015: Reno Bighorns
- 2015: AZS Koszalin
- 2016: Iowa Energy
- 2016: Al-Muharraq SC
- 2018–2019: Español de Talca
- 2018–2019: Windsor Express
- 2022-2023: KW Titans

Career highlights
- NBL Canada blocks leader (2019); North Carolina Mr. Basketball (2008)

Tyran Jamall "Ty" Walker (born August 7, 1989) is an American former professional basketball player who currently plays for KW Titans of the NBL Canada.

== Prep/High School Awards & Honors ==
- North Carolina Gatorade Player of the Year – 2007, 2008
- North Carolina Mr. Basketball – 2008

== College statistics ==
Year	Team	GP	GS	MPG	FG%	3P%	FT%	RPG	APG	SPG	BPG	PPG
2008–09	Wake Forest	11	0	3.8	.357	.000	.000	1.09	0.09	0.18	0.36	0.91
2009–10	Wake Forest	8	0	6.0	.312	.000	.714	1.38	0.12	0.25	1.12	1.88
2010–11	Wake Forest	32	9	18.1	.453	.000	.559	3.50	0.44	0.56	2.47	3.59
2011–12	Wake Forest	20	14	19.9	.481	.000	.800	4.55	0.60	0.35	2.60	4.20
Career		71	23	15.0	.447	.000	.604	3.18	0.39	0.41	2.03	3.15

=== Playoffs ===
Year	Team	GP	GS	MPG	FG%	3P%	FT%	RPG	APG	SPG	BPG	PPG
2009–10	Wake Forest	1		8.0	.000	.000	.750	1.0	0.0	1.0	3.0	3.0

== The Basketball Tournament ==
Ty Walker played for Team Wake The Nation in the 2018 edition of The Basketball Tournament. He had three points and three rebounds in the team's first-round loss to Team Showtime.

== Career statistics ==
Legend
GP	Games played	GS	Games started	MPG	Minutes per game
FG%	Field goal percentage	3P%	3-point field goal percentage	FT%	Free throw percentage
RPG	Rebounds per game	APG	Assists per game	SPG	Steals per game
BPG	Blocks per game	PPG	Points per game	**Bold**	Career high

=== Regular season ===
Year	Team	GP	GS	MPG	FG%	3P%	FT%	RPG	APG	SPG	BPG	PPG
2012–13	Kołobrzeg/Limoges	28	18	17.2	.500	.500	.562	5.54	0.93	0.46	2.11	4.61
2013–14	MNE/ERI	43	19	21.7	.628	.000	.590	6.21	0.77	0.40	2.28	5.88
2014–15	Akita	30	14	20	56.7%	0.0%	46.2%	7.0	0.9	0.4	1.7	5.7
2014–15	RNO	15	4	12.9	.655	.000	.375	3.13	0.53	0.47	1.53	2.73
2015–16	IWA	11	8	22.4	.540	.000	.333	8.00	0.36	0.09	1.91	5.45
2015–16	Koszalin	14	14	14.4	.515	.000	.600	4.64	0.29	0.29	1.79	3.07
2018–19	Windsor	26	16	22.7	.626	.000	.552	6.08	1.08	0.38	2.23	5.77
