= Skip Brown =

American basketball player (born 1955)

Personal information
- Born: January 21, 1955 (age 71) Kingsport, Tennessee, U.S.
- Listed height: 6 ft 0 in (1.83 m)
- Listed weight: 165 lb (75 kg)

Career information
- High school: Dobyns-Bennett (Kingsport, Tennessee)
- College: Wake Forest (1973–1977)
- NBA draft: 1977: 3rd round, 56th overall pick
- Drafted by: Boston Celtics
- Position: Point guard
- Number: 15

Career highlights
- Fourth-team All-American – NABC (1977); 2× First-team All-ACC (1975, 1977); Second-team All-ACC (1976); No. 15 retired by Wake Forest Demon Deacons
- Stats at Basketball Reference

Simpson "Skip" Brown Jr. (born January 21, 1955) is an American former college basketball player and an assistant athletic director at Wake Forest University. Brown was also an All-American player at Wake Forest.

Brown, a 6'0" point guard from Dobyns-Bennett High School in Kingsport, Tennessee, played college basketball at Wake Forest. While there, he became one of the school's best all-time players. As a sophomore, Brown averaged 22.7 points and 6.8 assists per game and was named first team All-Atlantic Coast Conference (ACC). As a senior, Brown again made first team All-ACC as he averaged 18.6 points and 6.2 assists per game and led the Demon Deacons to the Midwest Regional final of the 1977 NCAA Tournament, where they lost to eventual champion Marquette. In his career, Brown scored 2,034 points and in 1998 his number was retired by Wake Forest.

After graduation, Brown was drafted in the third round (56th pick overall) of the 1977 NBA draft by the Boston Celtics. When he did not make the team's final roster, he focused his attention on a career in banking, although in 1978 he did play a few games for the Winston-Salem franchise of the now defunct All-American Basketball Alliance professional league before they folded. After a long career at Bank of America, he co-founded and served as president of TriStone Community Bank and later First Community Bank.

In September, 2013, Brown was hired as assistant athletic director for student-athlete development and operations finance at his alma mater, Wake Forest.
