= Juke Harris =

American basketball player (born 2005)

No. 2 – Tennessee Volunteers
- Position: Shooting guard
- Conference: Southeastern Conference

Personal information
- Born: July 22, 2005 (age 21) Salisbury, North Carolina, U.S.
- Listed height: 6 ft 7 in (2.01 m)
- Listed weight: 200 lb (91 kg)

Career information
- High school: Salisbury (Salisbury, North Carolina)
- College: Wake Forest (2024–2026); Tennessee (2026–present)

Career highlights
- Second-team All-ACC (2026); ACC Most Improved Player (2026)

Jayden "Juke" Harris (born July 22, 2005) is an American college basketball player for the Tennessee Volunteers of the Southeastern Conference (SEC). He previously played for the Wake Forest Demon Deacons.

== Early life ==
Harris attended Salisbury High School in Salisbury, North Carolina. As a senior, he averaged 31.6 points per game becoming the all-time leading scorer in Rowan County history. A four-star recruit, Harris committed to play college basketball at Wake Forest University.

== College career ==
As a true freshman, Harris averaged 6.1 points and 2.8 rebounds per game coming off the bench. Following his freshman campaign, he announced his decision to return the following season. As a sophomore, Harris's production significantly increased, becoming the team's leading scorer. Against West Virginia, he scored 28 points, hitting seven three-pointers, leading the Demon Deacons to a 75–66 victory. On April 3, 2026, Harris announced that he will enter the 2026 NBA draft while entering his name in the transfer portal. On May 4, 2026, he committed to Tennessee where he will play for the Volunteers.

== Career statistics ==
Legend
GP	Games played	GS	Games started	MPG	Minutes per game
FG%	Field goal percentage	3P%	3-point field goal percentage	FT%	Free throw percentage
RPG	Rebounds per game	APG	Assists per game	SPG	Steals per game
BPG	Blocks per game	PPG	Points per game	**Bold**	Career high

=== College ===
Year	Team	GP	GS	MPG	FG%	3P%	FT%	RPG	APG	SPG	BPG	PPG
2024–25	Wake Forest	31	1	19.0	.426	.303	.595	2.8	.3	.5	.2	6.1
2025–26	Wake Forest	35	35	35.1	.444	.332	.783	6.5	1.9	1.3	.2	21.4
