= Bryant Crawford =

American basketball player (born 1997)

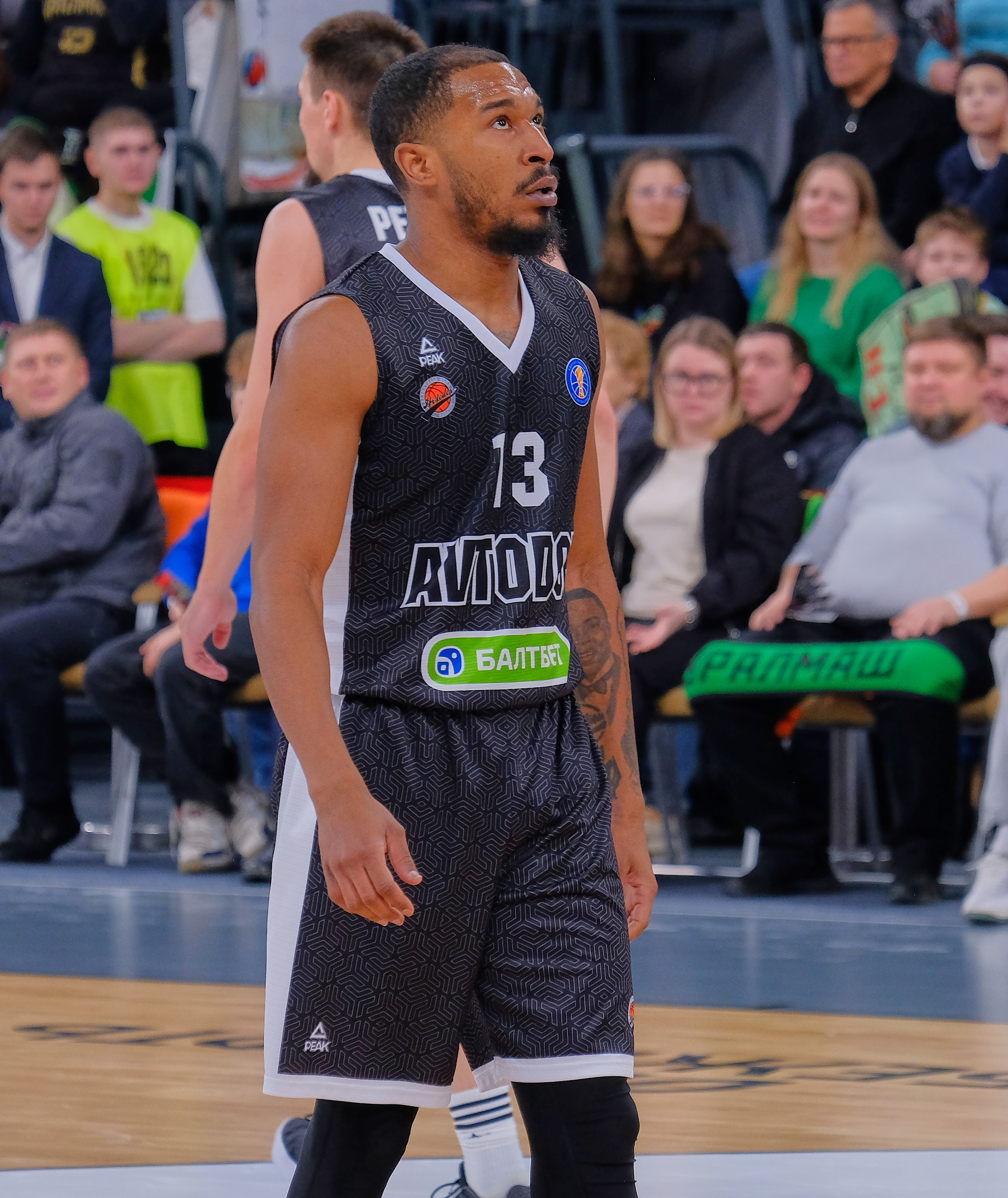
- Crawford with BC Avtodor in 2024

No. 4 – Hapoel Eilat
- Position: Point guard
- League: Israeli Basketball Premier League

Personal information
- Born: March 21, 1997 (age 29) Silver Spring, Maryland, U.S.
- Listed height: 1.91 m (6 ft 3 in)
- Listed weight: 85 kg (187 lb)

Career information
- High school: Gonzaga (Washington, D.C.)
- College: Wake Forest (2015–2018)
- NBA draft: 2018: undrafted
- Playing career: 2018–present

Career history
- 2018–2019: Hapoel Gilboa Galil
- 2019–2021: Juventus Utena
- 2021–2022: Reggio Emilia
- 2022–2023: Igokea
- 2023–2024: Samsunspor
- 2024–2025: Avtodor
- 2025–2026: Bursaspor
- 2026: Löwen Braunschweig
- 2026–present: Hapoel Ironi Eilat

Career highlights
- Bosnian League champion (2023); Bosnian Cup winner (2023); ACC All-Freshman Team (2016)

Bryant DeJuan Crawford (born March 21, 1997) is an American professional basketball player for Hapoel Ironi Eilat of the Israeli Basketball Premier League. He played college basketball for the Wake Forest Demon Deacons. Standing at 6 ft 3 in (1.91 m), Crawford plays at the point guard position.

== Early life and college career ==
Crawford attended Gonzaga College High School in Washington, where he averaged 13.1 points, 5.5 assists, 3.7 rebounds and 2.2 steals per game. On March 20, 2015, Crawford was named D.C. Gatorade Player of the Year.

Crawford played three years at Wake Forest University, where led the Demon Deacons in scoring (16.9 ppg), assists (152), 3-pointers (57), free throw percentage (86.8%) and steals (48) in his junior year. He became one of five ACC players to have at least 400 points and 125 assists as a freshman, sophomore and junior. Crawford ended his career ranked in the Wake Forest top 10 in career assists (7th-467), career 3-pointers (8th-167) and career steals (9th-149). Crawford also ranks in the top 25 in Wake Forest career scoring (23rd-1,470). On March 4, 2018, Crawford was named Honorable Mention All-ACC.

On May 29, 2018, after completing his junior year at Wake Forest, Crawford announced his plans to graduate and depart for a professional career.

== Professional career ==
=== Hapoel Gilboa Galil (2018–2019) ===
After going undrafted in the 2018 NBA draft, Crawford joined the Brooklyn Nets for the 2018 NBA Summer League.

On August 6, 2018, Crawford signed with the Israeli team Hapoel Gilboa Galil for the 2018–19 season. On October 21, Crawford recorded a season-high 25 points, shooting 9-of-12 from the field, along with three rebounds, three assists and six steals in an 86–76 win over Hapoel Tel Aviv. He was subsequently named Israeli League Round 3 MVP. On November 5, Crawford recorded 20 points, along with six rebounds, nine assists and four steals, leading Gilboa Galil to a 98–94 win over Maccabi Tel Aviv. He was subsequently named Israeli League Round 5 MVP. In 22 games played for Gilboa Galil, he averaged 15.3 points, 2.4 rebounds, 4.8 assists and 2.1 steals per game.

=== Juventus Utena (2019–2021) ===
On August 14, 2019, Crawford signed a one-year deal with Juventus Utena of the Lithuanian Basketball League. He averaged 12.3 points per game. Crawford re-signed with the team on August 11, 2020.

=== Reggio Emilia (2021–2022) ===
On July 12, 2021, Crawford sign a two years contract with exit option after one year with Reggio Emilia in the Italian Lega Basket Serie A.

=== Samsunspor (2023–2024) ===
On July 31, 2023, he signed with Reeder Samsunspor of the Turkish Basketbol Süper Ligi (BSL).

=== Avtodor (2024–2025) ===
On August 1, 2024, Bryant signed with the Russian club Avtodor of the VTB United League. He left the club in August 2025.

=== Bursaspor (2025–2026) ===
On August 15, 2025, Bryant signed with the Bursaspor of the Turkish Basketbol Süper Ligi (BSL).

=== Löwen Braunschweig (2026–present) ===
On March 11, 2026, he signed with Löwen Braunschweig of the Basketball Bundesliga (BBL).

== Career statistics ==
Legend
| GP | Games played | GS | Games started | MPG | Minutes per game |
| FG% | Field goal percentage | 3P% | 3-point field goal percentage | FT% | Free throw percentage |
| RPG | Rebounds per game | APG | Assists per game | SPG | Steals per game |
| BPG | Blocks per game | PPG | Points per game | **Bold** | Career high |

=== College ===
| Year | Team | GP | GS | MPG | FG% | 3P% | FT% | RPG | APG | SPG | BPG | PPG |
|---|---|---|---|---|---|---|---|---|---|---|---|---|
| 2015–16 | Wake Forest | 30 | 30 | 31.7 | .394 | .348 | .669 | 3.0 | 4.4 | **1.7** | **.2** | 13.7 |
| 2016–17 | Wake Forest | **33** | **33** | **31.8** | **.438** | .346 | .826 | **3.8** | **5.5** | 1.4 | **.2** | 16.1 |
| 2017–18 | Wake Forest | 31 | 30 | **31.8** | .413 | **.358** | **.868** | 2.9 | 4.9 | 1.5 | .1 | **16.8** |
| **Career** | | 94 | 93 | 31.8 | .416 | .351 | .799 | 3.2 | 4.9 | 1.5 | .2 | 15.6 |

Source: RealGM
