= Devin Thomas (basketball) =

American basketball player (born 1994)

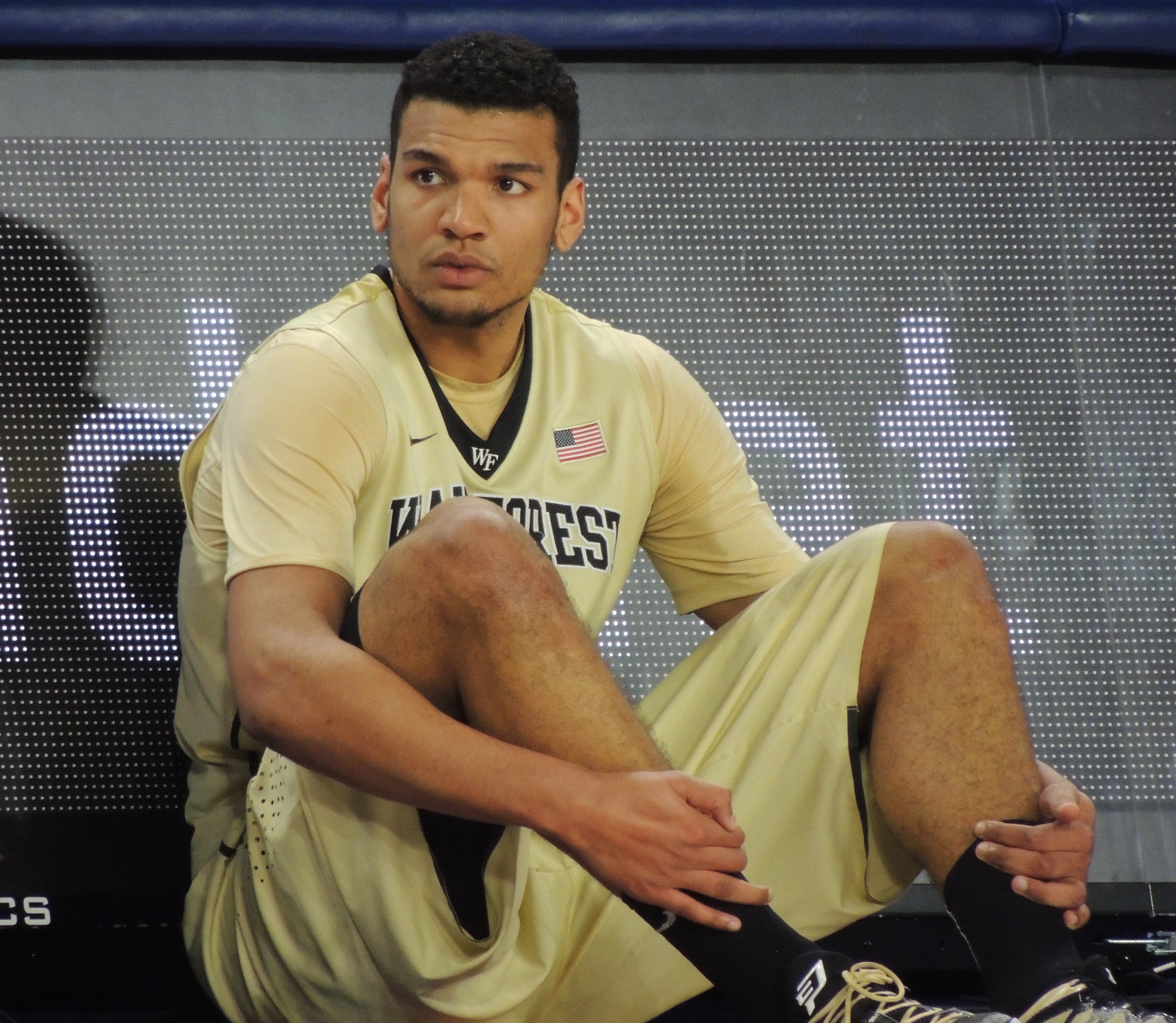
- Thomas with Wake Forest in December 2014

Ostioneros de Guaymas
- Position: Power forward / center
- League: CIBACOPA

Personal information
- Born: May 17, 1994 (age 32) Harrisburg, Pennsylvania, U.S.
- Listed height: 6 ft 9 in (2.06 m)
- Listed weight: 245 lb (111 kg)

Career information
- High school: Central Dauphin (Harrisburg, Pennsylvania)
- College: Wake Forest (2012–2016)
- NBA draft: 2016: undrafted
- Playing career: 2016–present

Career history
- 2016–2017: TED Ankara Kolejliler
- 2017–2018: Bilbao Basket
- 2018: Hapoel Eilat
- 2019: Lavrio
- 2019: Alba Fehérvár
- 2019–2020: Peñarol
- 2020–2021: BC Kalev
- 2022: Prishtina
- 2023–present: Ostioneros de Guaymas

Career highlights
- Estonian Cup winner (2020); ACC All-Freshman Team (2013)

Devin Robert Thomas (born May 17, 1994) is an American professional basketball player for the Ostioneros de Guaymas of the CIBACOPA. He played college basketball for Wake Forest University before playing professionally in Turkey, Spain, Israel, Greece, Argentina and Estonia.

== High school career ==
Thomas attended Central Dauphin High School in Harrisburg, Pennsylvania. He finished his career as the school's all time leading scorer (1,714 points), and received 2 time first team All-State class AAAA honors. Thomas averaged 23.8 points, 13.9 rebounds, 2.4 assists and 2.6 blocked shots as a senior, leading his team to a 29–3 record and their deepest postseason run in school history. On February 16, 2012, Thomas made ESPN's top play by shattering a backboard on an alley-oop dunk during the Mid-Penn Conference Championship game. Central would go on to win the game when it was resumed the following day.

== College career ==
Thomas came to Wake Forest in 2012. He immediately entered the starting lineup, averaging 9.1 points and 7.5 rebounds per game, earning Atlantic Coast Conference (ACC) All-Freshman Team honors. Over his four-year career, Thomas earned a reputation as an aggressive rebounder and fierce competitor. In his senior season, Thomas averaged a double-double at 15.6 points and 10.2 rebounds per game, but endured an up-and-down season as the Demon Deacons went 11–20 and Thomas was suspended for two games in February, 2016. For Thomas' career, he recorded over 1,000 rebounds, 4th all-time in school history.

== Professional career ==
=== 2016–17 season ===
After going undrafted in the 2016 NBA draft, Thomas joined the Minnesota Timberwolves for the 2016 NBA Summer League.

On September 24, 2016, Thomas signed with TED Ankara Kolejliler of the Turkish Super League. On October 29, 2016, Thomas recorded a double-double with a career-high 26 points and 12 rebounds, shooting 10-of-13 from the field, along with two assists in a 75–96 loss to Istanbul BB. In 27 games played during the 2016–17 season, he averaged 11.4 points, 7.7 rebounds, 3.3 assists and 1.2 steals per game.

=== 2017–18 season ===
On November 20, 2017, Thomas signed with Spanish club Bilbao Basket for the rest of the 2017–18 season. In 24 Liga ACB games played for Bilbao, Thomas averaged 8.6 points, 4.9 rebounds, 1.1 assists and 1.1 steals per game.

=== 2018–19 season ===
On September 2, 2018, Thomas signed a one-year deal with the Israeli team Hapoel Eilat. On October 18, 2018, he parted ways with Eilat after appearing in two Israeli League games.

On January 4, 2019, Thomas signed with the Greek team Lavrio for the rest of the season. However, on February 13, 2019, Thomas parted ways with Lavrio to join the Hungarian team Alba Fehérvár for a two-week-trial.

=== 2019–20 season ===
In 2019, Thomas appeared in 19 games for Club Atlético Peñarol in Lida Nacional de Basquet, the top level of the Argentine system, averaging 15.7 points and 11.05 rebounds per game.

=== 2020–21 season ===
On August 27, 2020, Thomas signed with Kalev/Cramo in the top tier Latvian–Estonian Basketball League. He was named player of the week on November 15, after recording 22 points and 13 rebounds in a win against Rapla KK.

=== 2021–22 season ===
On November 19, 2021, Thomas signed with South East Melbourne Phoenix for the 2021–22 NBL season. He was released on December 30, 2021, before appearing in a game for them following multiple breaches of contract and breaches of the Phoenix code of conduct.

On April 3, 2022, he has signed with Prishtina in the Kosovo Superleague.

== Personal life ==
Thomas is the younger brother of WNBA player and former Maryland All-American Alyssa Thomas.
