= Ron Watts =

NBA basketball player (1943–2022)

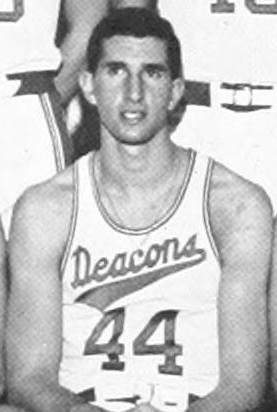
- Watts, circa 1965

Personal information
- Born: May 21, 1943 Washington, D.C., U.S.
- Died: November 2, 2022 (aged 79) Rockville, Maryland, U.S.
- Listed height: 6 ft 6 in (1.98 m)
- Listed weight: 220 lb (100 kg)

Career information
- High school: Woodrow Wilson (Washington, D.C.)
- College: Wake Forest (1962–1965)
- NBA draft: 1965: 2nd round, 13th overall pick
- Drafted by: Boston Celtics
- Playing career: 1965–1967
- Position: Small forward
- Number: 12

Career history
- 1965–1967: Boston Celtics

Career highlights
- NBA champion (1966)
- Stats at NBA.com
- Stats at Basketball Reference

Ronald Michael Watts (May 21, 1943 – November 2, 2022) was an American professional basketball player.

A 6'6" small forward from Wake Forest University, Watts played in the National Basketball Association (NBA) for two seasons (1965–67) as a member of the Boston Celtics.

After his career with the Celtics, he was featured in a series of Clio-award-winning commercials for AT&T with his good friend Bill Russell. The commercials showed Watts and Russell cracking jokes at each other's expense, and helped to launch AT&T's long-distance telephone service. Watts found fame with this commercial and its success was parlayed into the WATS line, standing for "Wide Area Telecommunications Service", which was AT&T's corporate offering for businesses. When AT&T was the largest company in the world, the revenue from the WATS line alone would have made it the eighth largest corporation in the world. However, this was before celebrities were highly compensated for endorsement deals and Watts received no profit share.

Watts died on November 2, 2022, at the age of 79.

== Career statistics ==
Legend
GP	Games played	GS	Games started	MPG	Minutes per game
FG%	Field goal percentage	3P%	3-point field goal percentage	FT%	Free throw percentage
RPG	Rebounds per game	APG	Assists per game	SPG	Steals per game
BPG	Blocks per game	PPG	Points per game	**Bold**	Career high
†	Won an NBA championship

=== NBA ===
==== Regular season ====
Year	Team	GP	MPG	FG%	FT%	RPG	APG	PPG
1965–66†	Boston	1	3.0	**.500**	–	1.0	**1.0**	**2.0**
1966–67	Boston	**27**	**3.3**	.250	**.696**	**1.4**	.0	1.4
Career		28	3.3	.261	.696	1.4	.1	1.4

==== Playoffs ====
Year	Team	GP	MPG	FG%	FT%	RPG	APG	PPG
1967	Boston	1	5.0	.167	.500	2.0	.0	3.0
