= Jack Murdock (basketball) =

American basketball player and coach

Jack Murdock (born 1934) is an American former basketball player and coach. He was the a head basketball coach at Wake Forest University. In 1953, he led Hugh Morson High School in Raleigh to the North Carolina state basketball championship. He was also the MVP of the 1953 East-West Basketball All-Star Game. From 1954 to 1957, he played basketball at Wake Forest. In 1956, he was a second-team all-Atlantic Coast Conference (ACC) selection, and in 1957, he was a first-team selection. He finished his collegiate career with 1,239 points and 14.9 points per game. He averaged 85% free throws, and at one point converted an ACC record 39 straight.

Murdock also played baseball during his freshman and senior seasons. In 1966, he was selected as the school's basketball coach. He posted an 8-18 record during his only season. He is a member of the North Carolina Sports Hall of Fame.
