= Anthony Teachey =

American basketball player (born 1962)

Personal information
- Born: March 27, 1962 (age 64) Goldsboro, North Carolina, U.S.
- Listed height: 6 ft 9 in (2.06 m)
- Listed weight: 210 lb (95 kg)

Career information
- High school: Goldsboro (Goldsboro, North Carolina)
- College: Wake Forest (1980–1984)
- NBA draft: 1984: 2nd round, 40th overall pick
- Drafted by: Dallas Mavericks
- Playing career: 1984–1990
- Position: Power forward / center

Career history
- 1984–1985: Pallacanestro Livorno
- 1985–1986: Libertas Forlì
- 1986–1987: Pallacanestro Livorno
- 1987: Caja de Ronda
- 1987–1988: CEP Lorient
- 1989–1990: La Crosse Catbirds
- 1990: CAI Neuquén

Career highlights
- Second-team All-ACC (1984)
- Stats at Basketball Reference

Anthony Wayne Teachey (born March 27, 1962) is an American former basketball player. He played several years in the top leagues in Italy, Spain, France and Argentina and played college basketball at Wake Forest University.

Teachey came to Wake Forest from Goldsboro High School in Goldsboro, North Carolina as an undersized but athletic center. As a senior, Teachey led the Atlantic Coast Conference (ACC) in rebounding at 10.0 per game and added 13.1 points per game, earning second-team All-ACC honors. The Deacons made a run in the 1984 NCAA tournament, ultimately falling to Houston and future Hall of Fame center Hakeem Olajuwon. Following his senior season, Teachey was invited to the 1984 Olympic trials but did not make the final roster.

Following the close of his college career, Teachey was drafted by the Dallas Mavericks in the second round of the 1984 NBA draft (40th pick overall). However, he chose to sign in Italy instead. Teachey played six seasons of professional basketball, primarily in Europe. He also had a short stint with the La Crosse Catbirds of the Continental Basketball Association during the 1989–90 season.

After his playing career ended, Teachey stayed involved in basketball by working with children in sports in his hometown of Goldsboro.
