= Tyree Appleby =

American basketball player (born 1998)

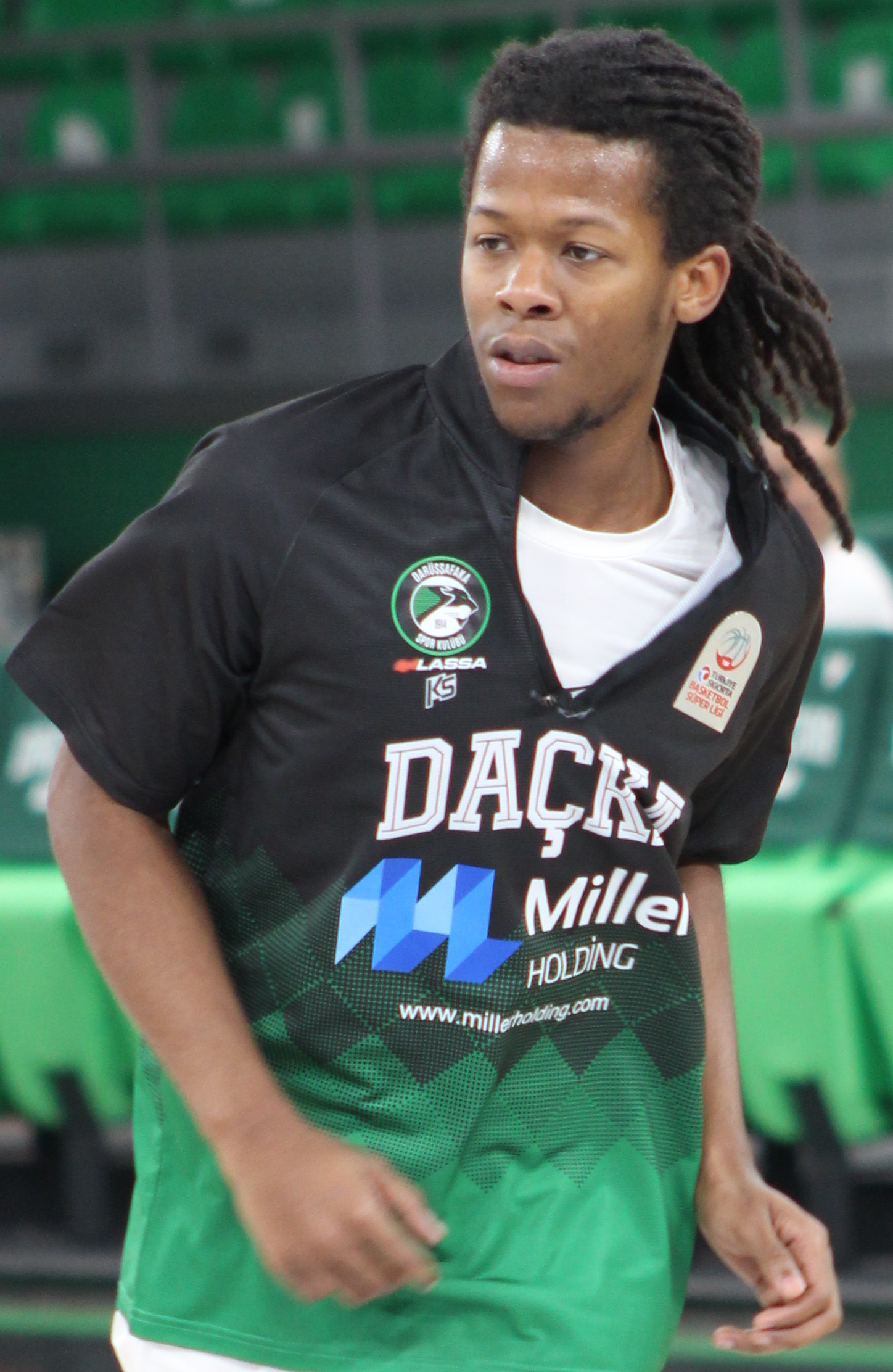

No. 1 – Mykonos
- Position: Point guard
- League: Greek Basketball League

Personal information
- Born: September 30, 1998 (age 28) Little Rock, Arkansas, U.S.
- Listed height: 6 ft 0 in (1.83 m)
- Listed weight: 175 lb (79 kg)

Career information
- High school: Jacksonville (Jacksonville, Arkansas)
- College: Cleveland State (2017–2019); Florida (2020–2022); Wake Forest (2022–2023)
- NBA draft: 2023: undrafted
- Playing career: 2023–present

Career history
- 2023–2024: Limoges CSP
- 2024–2025: Darüşşafaka
- 2025–present: Mykonos

Career highlights
- Greek League assists leader (2026); First-team All-ACC (2023); Second-team All-Horizon League (2019); Horizon League All-Freshman team (2018)

Tyree Jamar Appleby (born September 30, 1998) is an American professional basketball player for Mykonos of the Greek Basketball League. He played for the Cleveland State Vikings, Florida Gators and the Wake Forest Demon Deacons.

== College career ==
After starring at Jacksonville High School in Jacksonville, Arkansas, Appleby signed with coach Dennis Felton at Cleveland State. After a freshman season where he averaged 11.8 points and 4 assists per game and earned Horizon League all-freshman team honors, the point guard matured into one of the top players in the conference as a sophomore. As a sophomore for the Vikings, he averaged 17.2 points and 5.6 assists, earning second-team All-Horizon League honors.

After Felton was fired, Appleby transferred to Florida following the 2018–19 season. After sitting out a year per NCAA transfer rules, Appleby played two seasons for the Gators, averaging 11.1 points and 3.5 assists per game.

For the 2022–23 season, Appleby chose to play his final season of eligibility playing for coach Steve Forbes at Wake Forest. Early in the season, Appleby signed a Name, Image and Likeness (NIL) deal with restaurant chain Applebee's, playing off the similarity of his surname to the brand name. Appleby established himself as one of the top players in the Atlantic Coast Conference (ACC), leading the league in both scoring and assists through the last week of February. Appleby passed the 2,000 career point milestone on February 7, 2023.

== Professional career ==
=== Limoges CSP ===
On July 18, 2023, he signed with Limoges CSP of the LNB Pro A.

=== Darüssafaka ===
On July 3, 2024, he signed with Darüşşafaka of the Basketbol Süper Ligi (BSL).

=== Mykonos B.C. ===
On June 27, 2025, Appleby signed with Mykonos of the Greek Basketball League. He was the Greek Basketball League's assist leader of the 2025-26 season with 137 assists. He renewed his contract with Mykonos on June 12, 2026 for one more season.

== Personal life ==
Appleby is the son of Stanley Appleby and Latonya Cole. He has four siblings. His brother Raheem played basketball at Louisiana Tech University. His sister Shakyla Hill played basketball at Grambling State University.
