= Charlie Davis (basketball) =

American basketball player

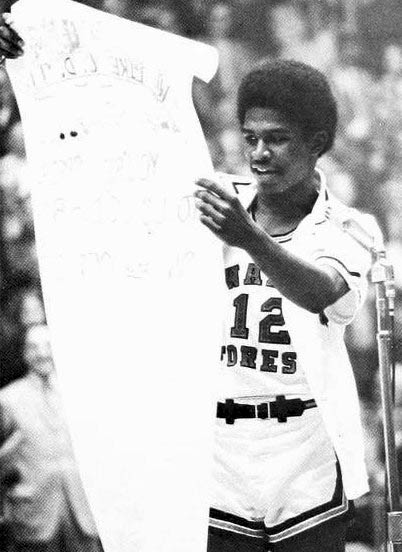
- Davis in 1971

Personal information
- Born: September 7, 1949 (age 77) New York City, New York, U.S.
- Listed height: 6 ft 2 in (1.88 m)
- Listed weight: 160 lb (73 kg)

Career information
- High school: Brooklyn Tech (New York City, New York); Laurinburg Institute (Laurinburg, North Carolina)
- College: Wake Forest (1968–1971)
- NBA draft: 1971: 8th round, 120th overall pick
- Drafted by: Cleveland Cavaliers
- Playing career: 1971–1973
- Position: Point guard
- Number: 18, 17

Career history
- 1971–1972: Cleveland Cavaliers
- 1972–1973: Portland Trail Blazers

Career highlights
- Fourth-team All-American – NABC (1971); ACC Player of the Year (1971); 3× First-team All-ACC (1969–1971); No. 12 retired by Wake Forest Demon Deacons

Career NBA statistics
- Points: 1,287 (8.9 ppg)
- Rebounds: 219 (1.5 rpg)
- Assists: 319 (2.2 apg)
- Stats at NBA.com
- Stats at Basketball Reference

Charles Lawrence Davis (born September 7, 1949) is best known for being an outstanding college basketball player for Wake Forest University (WFU). From New York City, he was the second African American player in Wake Forest's history. Davis was the 1971 Atlantic Coast Conference (ACC) Men's Basketball Player of the Year, and the first black player to win the award.

Davis garnered first-team All-ACC honors for three years in a row, and was an eighth-round NBA draft pick (120th overall) by the Cleveland Cavaliers in 1971.

== Career statistics ==
Legend
GP	Games played	GS	Games started	MPG	Minutes per game
FG%	Field goal percentage	3P%	3-point field goal percentage	FT%	Free throw percentage
RPG	Rebounds per game	APG	Assists per game	SPG	Steals per game
BPG	Blocks per game	PPG	Points per game	**Bold**	Career high

=== NBA ===
==== Regular season ====
Year	Team	GP	MPG	FG%	FT%	RPG	APG	SPG	BPG	PPG
1971–72	Cleveland	61	18.8	.402	**.840**	1.5	2.0			**9.8**
1972–73	Cleveland	6	14.3	**.488**	.571	.8	1.7			7.3
1972–73	Portland	**69**	**19.3**	.412	.783	**1.6**	**2.5**			8.9
1973–74	Portland	8	11.3	.350	.750	1.4	1.4	.3	.0	3.9
Career		144	18.4	.408	.806	1.5	2.2	.3	.0	8.9

== Sources ==
- Charlie Davis
