= Guy Morgan (basketball) =

American basketball player (born 1960)

Personal information
- Born: August 23, 1960 (age 65) Virginia Beach, Virginia, U.S.
- Listed height: 6 ft 8 in (2.03 m)
- Listed weight: 205 lb (93 kg)

Career information
- High school: First Colonial (Virginia Beach, Virginia)
- College: Wake Forest (1978–1982)
- NBA draft: 1982: 2nd round, 40th overall pick
- Drafted by: Indiana Pacers
- Position: Shooting guard
- Number: 35

Career history
- 1982–1983: Indiana Pacers
- 1983: Montana Golden Nuggets

Career highlights
- McDonald's All-American (1978); Third-team Parade All-American (1978)
- Stats at NBA.com
- Stats at Basketball Reference

Munden Guy Morgan (born August 23, 1960) is an American former professional basketball player born in Virginia Beach, Virginia.

A 6'8" shooting guard from Wake Forest University, Morgan was selected by the Indiana Pacers in the second round of the 1982 NBA draft. He played eight games for the Pacers during the 1982–83 NBA season, scoring 15 points. After being waived by the Pacers, Morgan finished the 1982–83 season with the Montana Golden Nuggets of the Continental Basketball Association (CBA). He averaged 14.5 points and 6.1 rebounds in eight CBA games.

== Career statistics ==
Legend
GP	Games played	GS	Games started	MPG	Minutes per game
FG%	Field goal percentage	3P%	3-point field goal percentage	FT%	Free throw percentage
RPG	Rebounds per game	APG	Assists per game	SPG	Steals per game
BPG	Blocks per game	PPG	Points per game	**Bold**	Career high

=== NBA ===
==== Regular season ====
Year	Team	GP	GS	MPG	FG%	3P%	FT%	RPG	APG	SPG	BPG	PPG
1982–83	Indiana	8	0	5.8	.292	–	.250	2.1	.9	.3	.0	1.9
