= List of Phi Delta Chi chapters =

Phi Delta Chi is a professional fraternity founded in 1883 at the University of Michigan. In the following list of chapters, active chapters are indicated in bold and inactive chapters are in italics.

Chapter	Charter date and range	Institution	Location	Status	Ref.
**Alpha**	1883	University of Michigan	Ann Arbor, Michigan	Active	(Note: Chapter formed as part of Phi Chi fraternity that changed its name to Phi Delta Chi in 1909.)
Beta	1896–1917	Northwestern University	Evanston, Illinois	Inactive	(Note: Chapter closed when the college's Pharmacy School was discontinued.)
Gamma (First)	1899–1906	New York College of Pharmacy	New York City, New York	Moved	(Note: Chapter moved when New York College of Pharmacy merged into Columbia University.)
Gamma (Second)	1906–1976	Columbia University	New York City, New York	Inactive	
**Delta**	1900	University of Wisconsin	Madison, Wisconsin	Active	
**Epsilon**	1901	Saint Joseph's University	Philadelphia, Pennsylvania	Active	(Note: Chapter formed at Philadelphia College of Pharmacy, that became the University of the Sciences in 1988. In 2002, the university merged into Saint Joseph's University.)
**Zeta**	1902	University of California, San Francisco	San Francisco, California	Active	(Note: Chapter formed at the California College of Pharmacy that became the University of California, San Francisco in 1934.)
Eta	1902	Massachusetts College of Pharmacy and Health Sciences	Boston, Massachusetts	Inactive	
**Theta**	1904	University of Minnesota	Minneapolis, Minnesota	Active	
**Iota**	1905	University of Maryland School of Pharmacy	Baltimore, Maryland	Active	(Note: Chapter formed at the Maryland College of Pharmacy, now part of the University of Maryland)
Kappa	1905	University of Washington	Seattle, Washington	Inactive	
**Lambda**	1905	University of Texas at Austin	Austin, Texas	Active	(Note: Chapter started in Galveston but followed the pharmacy school to Austin in 1927.)
Mu (First)	1907–1908	Scio College of Pharmacy	Scio, Ohio	Reassigned	
**Mu (Second)**	1908	University of Pittsburgh	Pittsburgh, Pennsylvania	Active	
**Nu**	1907	University of Iowa	Iowa City, Iowa	Active	
**Xi**	1908	Ohio State University	Columbus, Ohio	Active	
**Omicron**	1909	University of Southern California	Los Angeles, California	Active	
Pi (First)	1912–1976	University of Nebraska–Lincoln	Lincoln, Nebraska	Moved	(Note: Chapter formed at the University of Nebraska Lincoln but moved to the University of Nebraska Omaha with the Pharmacy School in 1976.)
Pi (Second)	1976	University of Nebraska Omaha	Omaha, Nebraska	Inactive	
**Rho**	1913	University of Oklahoma Health Sciences Center	Oklahoma City, Oklahoma	Active	(Note: Chapter was formed at the University of Oklahoma in Norman, OK. However, it moved to Oklahoma City with the Pharmacy School in 1976.)
Sigma (First)	1914–1992	University of Colorado Boulder	Boulder, Colorado	Active	(Note: Chapter formed at the University of Colorado Boulder but moved with the Pharmacy School to the University of Colorado School of Medicine in Aurora in 1992.)
**Sigma (Second)**	1992	University of Colorado School of Medicine	Aurora, Colorado	Active	
**Tau**	1916	Purdue University	West Lafayette, Indiana	Active	
Upsilon	1917	University of Kansas	Lawrence, Kansas	Inactive	
Phi	1920	Creighton University	Omaha, Nebraska	Inactive	
**Chi**	1921	Auburn University	Auburn, Alabama	Active	(Note: Chapter formed at Alabama Polytechnic Institute that became Auburn University in 1959.)
Psi (First)	1921–1939	Highland Park College of Pharmacy (later Des Moines College of Pharmacy)	Des Moines, Iowa	Moved	(Note: This chapter was formed at the Highland Park College of Pharmacy which merged with Des Moines College (DMC). The Des Moines School of Pharmacy separated from Des Moines College in 1927 and DMC closed in 1929. The Pharmacy College closed in 1939. At that time, the former campus and faculty became part of Drake University, necessitating the chapter's move to Drake.)
**Psi (Second)**	1939	Drake University	Des Moines, Iowa	Active	
**Omega**	1922	University of Tennessee	Memphis, Tennessee	Active	
Alpha Alpha	1923–1949	Western Reserve University	Cleveland, Ohio	Inactive	
Alpha Beta (First)	1923–1947	Louisville College of Pharmacy	Louisville, Kentucky	Moved	(Note: The chapter formed at the Louisville College of Pharmacy that merged with the University of Kentucky in 1947. In 1957, the University of Kentucky College of Pharmacy moved from Louisville to Lexington, Kentucky.)
Alpha Beta (Second)	1947	University of Kentucky College of Pharmacy	Lexington, Kentucky	Inactive	
**Alpha Gamma**	1923	University of North Carolina at Chapel Hill	Chapel Hill, North Carolina	Active	
**Alpha Delta**	1925	Virginia Commonwealth University	Richmond, Virginia	Active	(Note: Chapter formed at Medical College of Virginia that merged to form Virginia Commonwealth University in 1968)
**Alpha Epsilon**	1928	University of Mississippi	Oxford, Mississippi	Active	
**Alpha Zeta**	1928	Idaho State University	Pocatello, Idaho	Active	(Note: Chapter formed at the University of Idaho-Southern Branch that became Idaho State University in 1962.)
Alpha Eta	1928	Wayne State University	Detroit, Michigan	Inactive	(Note: Chapter formed at the College of City of Detroit that became Wayne University in 1934 and Wayne State University in 1957.)
**Alpha Theta**	1931	Albany College of Pharmacy and Health Sciences	Albany, New York	Active	
**Alpha Iota**	1937	University of Georgia	Athens, Georgia	Active	
**Alpha Kappa**	1947	Medical University of South Carolina	Charleston, South Carolina	Active	(Note: Chapter formed at the South Carolina College of Pharmacy that became the Medical University of South Carolina.)
**Alpha Lambda**	1949	University of Connecticut	Storrs, Connecticut	Active	(Note: Chapter formed in New Haven but moved to Storrs with the Pharmacy School in 1951.)
**Alpha Mu**	1949	University of Wyoming	Laramie, Wyoming	Active	
**Alpha Nu**	1950	University of Arizona	Tucson, Arizona	Active	
Alpha Xi	1950	Ferris State University	Big Rapids, Michigan	Inactive	
**Alpha Omicron**	1951	Temple University	Philadelphia, Pennsylvania	Active	
**Alpha Pi**	1951	University of Utah	Salt Lake City, Utah	Active	
Alpha Rho (First)	1951–1959	Southern School of Pharmacy	Atlanta, Georgia	Moved	(Note: Chapter formed at the Southern School of Pharmacy that merged with Mercer University in 1959.)
**Alpha Rho (Second)**	1959	Mercer University	Atlanta, Georgia	Active	
**Alpha Sigma**	1952	University of Illinois Chicago	Chicago, Illinois	Active	
**Alpha Tau**	1953	University of Houston	Houston, Texas	Active	
**Alpha Upsilon**	1955	Ohio Northern University	Ada, Ohio	Active	
**Alpha Phi**	1955	Butler University	Indianapolis, Indiana	Active	
Alpha Chi	1956	Samford University	Birmingham, Alabama	Inactive	(Note: Chapter formed at Howard College that became Samford University in 1965.)
**Alpha Psi**	1956	University of the Pacific	Stockton, California	Active	
**Alpha Omega**	1956	Southwestern Oklahoma State University	Weatherford, Oklahoma	Active	
**Beta Alpha**	1958	St. John's University	Queens, New York	Active	
**Beta Beta**	1959	University of Louisiana at Monroe	Monroe, Louisiana	Active	(Note: Chapter formed at Northeast Louisiana University that became the University of Louisiana Monroe in 1999.)
**Beta Gamma**	1960	Duquesne University	Pittsburgh, Pennsylvania	Active	
Beta Delta	1960	St. Louis College of Pharmacy	St. Louis, Missouri	Inactive	
Beta Epsilon	1960	University of Missouri–Kansas City	Kansas City, Missouri	Inactive	(Note: Chapter was established at the University of Kansas City that became the University of Missouri–Kansas City in 1960.)
**Beta Zeta**	1963	Arnold and Marie Schwartz College of Pharmacy	Brooklyn, New York	Active	(Note: Chapter formed at the Brooklyn College of Pharmacy, LIU that became the A&M Schwartz College of Pharmacy, LIU Arnold and Marie Schwartz College of Pharmacy in 1976.)
**Beta Eta**	1967	University of Arkansas	Little Rock, Arkansas	Active	
**Beta Theta**	1981	University of South Carolina College of Pharmacy	Columbia, South Carolina	Active	
**Beta Iota**	1982	Oregon State University	Corvallis, Oregon	Active	
**Beta Kappa**	1988	Campbell University School of Pharmacy	Buies Creek, North Carolina	Active	
**Beta Lambda**	1991	Nova Southeastern University	Fort Lauderdale, Florida	Active	(Note: Chapter formed at the Southeastern University of Health Sciences that changed its name to Nova Southeastern University in 1994.)
Beta Mu	1991	Howard University	Washington, D.C.	Inactive	
**Beta Nu**	1992	Rutgers University	Piscataway, New Jersey	Active	
**Beta Xi**	1994	Midwestern University, Downers Grove campus	Downers Grove, Illinois	Active	
Beta Omicron	1997	Texas Southern University	Houston, Texas	Inactive	
**Beta Pi**	1998	Shenandoah University	Winchester, Virginia	Active	
**Beta Rho**	1999	Texas Tech University	Amarillo, Texas	Active	
**Beta Sigma**	2000	Midwestern University - Glendale	Glendale, Arizona	Active	
Beta Tau	2002	State University of New York at Buffalo	Buffalo, New York	Inactive	
**Beta Upsilon**	2002	Roseman University of Health Sciences College of Pharmacy	Henderson, Nevada	Active	(Note: Chapter formed at the Nevada College of Pharmacy in Las Vegas which changed its name to the University of Southern Nevada in 2004. It moved to Henderson, Nevada in 2005 and changed its name to Roseman University of Health Sciences in 2011.)
**Beta Phi**	2003	Palm Beach Atlantic University	West Palm Beach, Florida	Active	
**Beta Chi**	2004	Northeastern University	Boston, Massachusetts	Active	
**Beta Psi**	2004	University of Minnesota Duluth	Duluth, Minnesota	Active	
**Beta Omega**	2005	Wingate University	Wingate, North Carolina	Active	
**Gamma Alpha**	2007	University of New Mexico	Albuquerque, New Mexico	Active	
**Gamma Beta**	2007	Pacific University	Forest Grove, Oregon	Active	
**Gamma Gamma**	2007	Appalachian College of Pharmacy	Oakwood, Virginia	Active	
**Gamma Delta**	2009	East Tennessee State University	Johnson City, Tennessee	Active	
**Gamma Epsilon**	2009	Texas A&M University–Kingsville Irma Lerma Rangel School of Pharmacy	Kingsville, Texas	Active	
**Gamma Zeta**	2009	St. John Fisher University	Rochester, New York	Active	
**Gamma Eta**	2009	Texas Tech University Health Sciences Center School of Pharmacy	Abilene, Texas	Active	
**Gamma Theta**	2010	University of Hawaii at Hilo, Daniel K. Inouye College of Pharmacy	Hilo, Hawaii	Active	
**Gamma Iota**	2010	California Northstate University College of Pharmacy	Rancho Cordova, California	Active	
**Gamma Kappa***	2010	Chicago State University	Chicago, Illinois	Active	
**Gamma Lambda**	2010	Auburn University Harrison College of Pharmacy	Mobile, Alabama	Active	(Note: Chapter is affiliated with the Auburn University program held at the University of South Alabama.)
**Gamma Mu**	2010	Husson University	Bangor, Maine	Active	
**Gamma Nu**	2011	University of the Incarnate Word	San Antonio, Texas	Active	
**Gamma Xi**	2011	Belmont University	Nashville, Tennessee	Active	
**Gamma Omicron**	2011	University of Maryland Eastern Shore	Princess Anne, Maryland	Active	
**Gamma Pi**	2011	D'Youville University School of Pharmacy	Buffalo, New York	Active	
**Gamma Rho**	2012	Regis University School of Pharmacy	Denver, Colorado	Active	
**Gamma Sigma**	2013	Rosalind Franklin University of Medicine and Science	North Chicago, Illinois	Active	
**Gamma Tau**	2013	Western New England University College of Pharmacy and Health Sciences	Springfield, Massachusetts	Active	
Gamma Upsilon	2013	Lake Erie College of Osteopathic Medicine	Bradenton, Florida	Inactive	
**Gamma Phi**	2013	University of Findlay	Findlay, Ohio	Active	
**Gamma Chi**	2014	University of Charleston	Charleston, West Virginia	Active	
**Gamma Psi**	2014	Washington State University Spokane	Spokane, Washington	Active	
**Gamma Omega**	2014	Lipscomb University College of Pharmacy	Nashville, Tennessee	Active	
**Delta Alpha**	2015	Marshall University School of Pharmacy	Huntington, West Virginia	Active	
**Delta Beta**	2015	University of North Texas College of Pharmacy	Fort Worth, Texas	Active	
Delta Gamma	2015	California Health Sciences University	Clovis, California	Inactive	
**Delta Delta**	2016	University of Florida College of Pharmacy	Gainesville, Florida	Active	
**Delta Epsilon**	2017	Chapman University School of Pharmacy	Irvine, California	Active	
**Delta Zeta**	2017	Keck Graduate Institute School of Pharmacy	Claremont, California	Active	
Delta Eta	2018	Roseman University of Health Sciences South Jordan Campus	South Jordan, Utah	Inactive	
**Delta Theta**	2018	Larkin University College of Pharmacy	Miami, Florida	Active	
**Delta Iota**	2020	University of Texas at Tyler	Tyler, Texas	Active	
**Delta Kappa**	2021	Texas Tech University Dallas Campus	Dallas, Texas	Active	
**Delta Lambda**	2021	Marshall B. Ketchum University	Fullerton, California	Active	
**Delta Mu**	2022	West Coast University	Los Angeles, California	Active	
