= List of Phi Lambda Sigma chapters =

Phi Lambda Sigma, also known as the National Pharmacy Leadership Society, is a North American college honor society for pharmacy students.

In the following list of chapters, active chapters are indicated in bold and inactive chapters and institutions are in italics.

#	Chapter	Charter date and range	Institution	Location	Status	Ref.
1	**Alpha**	1965	Auburn University	Auburn, Alabama	Active	
2	**Beta**	1971	Samford University	Homewood, Alabama	Active	
3	**Gamma**	1974	Mercer University	Macon, Georgia	Active	
4	**Delta**	1974	University of Georgia	Athens, Georgia	Active	
5	**Epsilon**	1976	University of North Carolina at Chapel Hill	Chapel Hill, North Carolina	Active	
6	**Zeta**	1979	University of South Carolina	Columbia, South Carolina	Active	
7	**Eta**	1980	Duquesne University	Pittsburgh, Pennsylvania	Active	
8	**Theta**	1980	University of Tennessee	Knoxville, Tennessee	Active	
9	**Iota**	1980	University of Florida	Gainesville, Florida	Active	
10	**Kappa**	1981	Ohio Northern University	Ada, Ohio	Active	
11	**Lambda**	1982	Rutgers University	Piscataway, New Jersey	Active	
12	**Mu**	1982	University of Rhode Island	Kingston, Rhode Island	Active	
13	**Nu**	1983	University of Toledo	Toledo, Ohio	Active	
14	**Xi**	1983	St. John's University	Queens (NYC), New York	Active	
15	**Omicron**	1983	Albany College	Albany, New York	Active	
16	**Pi**	1985	Butler University	Indianapolis, Indiana	Active	
17	**Rho**	1986	University of the Pacific	Stockton, California	Active	
18	**Sigma**	1987	Massachusetts College of Pharmacy and Health Sciences	Boston, Massachusetts	Active	
19	**Tau**	1987	Ferris State University	Big Rapids, Michigan	Active	
20	**Upsilon**	1988	University of Houston	Houston, Texas	Active	
21	**Phi**	1988	University of Southern California	Los Angeles, California	Active	
22	**Chi**	1988	University of Kentucky	Lexington, Kentucky	Active	
23	**Psi**	1988	University of Texas at Austin	Austin, Texas	Active	
24	**Omega**	1989	Nova Southeastern University	Fort Lauderdale and Davie, Florida	Active	
25	**Alpha Alpha**	1989	Idaho State University College of Pharmacy	Pocatello, Idaho	Active	
26	**Alpha Beta**	1989	University of Mississippi	University, Mississippi	Active	
27	**Alpha Gamma**	1989	University of Connecticut	Storrs, Connecticut	Active	
28	**Alpha Delta**	1990	Xavier University	Cincinnati, Ohio	Active	
29	**Alpha Epsilon**	1990	University of Oklahoma	Norman, Oklahoma	Active	
30	**Alpha Zeta**	1990	Campbell University	Buies Creek, North Carolina	Active	
31	**Alpha Eta**	1990	West Virginia University	Morgantown, West Virginia	Active	
32	**Alpha Theta**	1990	University of Health Sciences and Pharmacy in St. Louis	St. Louis, Missouri	Active	
33	**Alpha Iota**	1990	University of Illinois Chicago	Chicago, Illinois	Active	
34	**Alpha Kappa**	1990	South Dakota State University	Brookings, South Dakota	Active	
35	**Alpha Lambda**	1990	North Dakota State University	Fargo, North Dakota	Active	
36	**Alpha Mu**	1991	Creighton University	Omaha, Nebraska	Active	
37	**Alpha Nu**	1991	University of Wyoming	Laramie, Wyoming	Active	
38	**Alpha Xi**	1991	University of Colorado Denver	Denver, Colorado	Active	
39	**Alpha Omicron**	1991	University of Cincinnati	Cincinnati, Ohio	Active	
40	**Alpha Pi**	1991	Texas Southern University	Houston, Texas	Active	
41	**Alpha Rho**	1991	Purdue University	West Lafayette, Indiana	Active	
42	**Alpha Sigma**	1991	Ohio State University	Columbus, Ohio	Active	
43	**Alpha Tau**	1992	University of Arizona	Tucson, Arizona	Active	
44	**Alpha Upsilon**	1993	Drake University	Des Moines, Iowa	Active	
45	**Alpha Phi**	1993	University of Minnesota	Minneapolis, Minnesota	Active	
46	**Alpha Chi**	1993	University of Utah	Salt Lake City, Utah	Active	
47	**Alpha Psi**	1993	Southwestern Oklahoma State University	Weatherford, Oklahoma	Active	
48	**Alpha Omega**	1993	University of Louisiana at Monroe	Monroe, Louisiana	Active	
49	**Beta Alpha**	1993	University of Wisconsin–Madison	Madison, Wisconsin	Active	
50	**Beta Beta**	1993	University of California, San Francisco	San Francisco, California	Active	
51	**Beta Gamma**	1993	University of Washington	Seattle, Washington	Active	
52	**Beta Delta**	1993	University of Pittsburgh	Pittsburgh, Pennsylvania	Active	
53	**Beta Epsilon**	1993	University of Iowa	Iowa City, Iowa	Active	
54	**Beta Zeta**	1994	Oregon State University	Corvallis, Oregon	Active	
55	**Beta Eta**	1994	University of Missouri–Kansas City	Kansas City, Missouri	Active	
56	**Beta Theta**	1994	University of Puerto Rico	San Juan, Puerto Rico	Active	
57	**Beta Iota**	1995	University of Kansas	Lawrence, Kansas	Active	
58	**Beta Kappa**	1995	LIU Pharmacy (Arnold and Marie Schwartz College of Pharmacy)	Brooklyn, New York	Active	
59	**Beta Lambda**	1996	University of Maryland School of Pharmacy	Baltimore, Maryland	Active	
60	**Beta Mu**	1998	Temple University	Philadelphia, Pennsylvania	Active	
61	**Beta Nu**	2000	Virginia Commonwealth University	Richmond, Virginia	Active	
62	**Beta Xi**	2001	University of Nebraska Medical Center	Omaha, Nebraska	Active	
63	**Beta Omicron**	2001	University at Buffalo	Buffalo, New York	Active	
64	**Beta Pi**	2001	Texas Tech University Health Sciences Center	Lubbock, Texas	Active	
65	**Beta Rho**	2001	Howard University	Washington, D.C.	Active	
66	**Beta Sigma**	2001	Florida A&M University	Tallahassee, Florida	Active	
67	**Beta Tau**	2001	Midwestern University-Glendale	Glendale, Arizona	Active	
68	**Beta Upsilon**	2002	University of Arkansas for Medical Sciences	Little Rock, Arkansas	Active	
69	**Beta Phi**	2002	Shenandoah University	Winchester, Virginia	Active	
70	**Beta Chi**	2002	Medical University of South Carolina	Charleston, South Carolina	Active	
71	**Beta Psi**	2003	Wilkes University	Wilkes-Barre, Pennsylvania	Active	
72	**Beta Omega**	2003	Roseman University of Health Sciences	Henderson, Nevada	Active	
73	**Gamma Alpha**	2003	University of New Mexico Health Sciences Center	Albuquerque, New Mexico	Active	
74	**Gamma Beta**	2003	Loma Linda University	Loma Linda, California	Active	
75	**Gamma Gamma**	2004	Massachusetts College of Pharmacy and Health Sciences Worcester and Manchester	Worcester, Massachusetts, and Manchester, New Hampshire	Active	
76	**Gamma Delta**	2005	South University	Savannah, Georgia	Active	
77	**Gamma Epsilon**	2005	Midwestern University Downers Grove Campus	Downers Grove, Illinois	Active	
78	**Gamma Zeta**	2005	Palm Beach Atlantic University	West Palm Beach, Florida	Active	
79	**Gamma Eta**	2005	University of the Sciences	Philadelphia, Pennsylvania	Active	
80	**Gamma Theta**	2006	Wingate University	Wingate, North Carolina	Active	
81	**Gamma Iota**	2006	Lake Erie College of Osteopathic Medicine Erie Campus	Erie, Pennsylvania	Active	
82	**Gamma Kappa**	2007	Northeastern University Bouvé College of Health Sciences	Boston, Massachusetts	Active	
83	**Gamma Lambda**	2008	Pacific University	Forest Grove, Oregon	Active	
84	**Gamma Mu**	2009	Texas A&M Health	Bryan, Texas	Active	
85	**Gamma Nu**	2009	Western University of Health Sciences	Pomona, California	Active	
86	**Gamma Xi**	2009	University of the Incarnate Word	San Antonio, Texas	Active	
87	**Gamma Omicron**	2009	Touro University California	Valiejo, California	Active	
88	**Gamma Pi**	2009	Lake Erie College of Osteopathic Medicine Bradenton Campus	Bradenton, Florida	Active	
89	**Gamma Rho**	2009	East Tennessee State University	Johnson City, Tennessee	Active	
90	**Gamma Sigma**	2010	Union University	Jackson, Tennessee	Active	
91	**Gamma Tau**	2010	Roseman University of Health Sciences – Utah Campus	South Jordan, Utah	Active	
92	**Gamma Upsilon**	2010	Washington State University	Pullman, Washington	Active	
93	**Gamma Phi**	2010	Northeast Ohio Medical University	Rootstown, Ohio	Active	
94	**Gamma Chi**	2010	Wayne State University	Detroit, Michigan	Active	
95	**Gamma Psi**	2011	University of Charleston School of Pharmacy	Charleston, West Virginia	Active	
96	Gamma Omega	2011–June 2021	Albany College of Pharmacy and Health Sciences – Vermont Campus	Colchester, Vermont	Inactive	(Note: The Vermont satellite campus closed in June 2021.)
97	**Delta Alpha**	2011	Lipscomb University	Nashville, Tennessee	Active	
98	**Delta Beta**	2011	Notre Dame of Maryland University	Baltimore, Maryland	Active	
99	**Delta Gamma**	2011	Chicago State University	Chicago, Illinois	Active	
100	**Delta Delta**	2012	Husson University	Bangor, Maine	Active	
101	**Delta Epsilon**	2012	Belmont University	Nashville, Tennessee	Active	
102	**Delta Zeta**	2012	University of New England	Portland, Maine	Active	
103	**Delta Eta**	2013	Southern Illinois University Edwardsville	Edwardsville, Illinois	Active	
104	**Delta Theta**	2013	Presbyterian College	Clinton, South Carolina	Active	
105	**Delta Iota**	2013	Appalachian College of Pharmacy	Oakwood, Virginia	Active	
106	**Delta Kappa**	October 16, 2013	University of Michigan	Ann Arbor, Michigan	Active	
107	**Delta Lambda**	September 14, 2013	University of Hawai’i at Hilo	Hilo, Hawaii	Active	
108	**Delta Mu**	2013	University of South Florida	Tampa, Florida	Active	
109	**Delta Nu**	2013	University of Maryland Eastern Shore	Princess Anne, Maryland	Active	
110	**Delta Xi**	2013	Sullivan University College of Pharmacy and Health Sciences	Louisville, Kentucky	Active	
111	**Delta Omicron**	2013	Concordia University	Montreal, Quebec, Canada	Active	
112	**Delta Pi**	2014	D’Youville University	Buffalo, New York	Active	
113	**Delta Rho**	2015	Western New England University	Springfield, Massachusetts	Active	
114	**Delta Sigma**	2015	Touro College of Pharmacy	Manhattan, New York, New York	Active	
115	**Delta Tau**	2015	Marshall University	Huntington, West Virginia	Active	
116	**Delta Upsilon**	2015	Cedarville University	Cedarville, Ohio	Active	
117	**Delta Phi**	2015	South University Columbia Campus	Columbia, South Carolina	Active	
118	**Delta Chi**	2015	Regis University	Denver, Colorado	Active	
119	**Delta Psi**	2015	South College	Nashville, Tennessee	Active	
120	**Delta Omega**	2015	Manchester University	North Manchester, Indiana	Active	
121	**Epsilon Alpha**	2015	University of California, San Diego	San Diego, California	Active	
122	**Epsilon Beta**	2016	University of North Texas Health Science Center College of Pharmacy	Fort Worth, Texas	Active	
123	**Epsilon Gamma**	2017	Rosalind Franklin University of Medicine and Science	North Chicago, Illinois	Active	
124	**Epsilon Delta**	2017	St. John Fisher University	Pittsford, New York	Active	
125	**Epsilon Epsilon**	2018	California Northstate University College of Pharmacy	Elk Grove, California	Active	
126	**Epsilon Zeta**	2018	California Health Science University	Clovis, California	Active	
127	**Epsilon Eta**	2018	Chapman University	Orange, California	Active	
128	**Epsilon Theta**	2019	Larkin University	Miami Gardens, Florida	Active	
129	**Epsilon Iota**	2019	Binghamton University	Binghamton, New York	Active	
130	**Epsilon Kappa**	2019	University of Texas at El Paso	El Paso, Texas	Active	
131	**Epsilon Lambda**	2020	Keck Graduate Institute	Claremont, California	Active	
132	**Epsilon Mu**	2020	University of Montana	Missoula, Montana	Active	
133	**Epsilon Nu**	2020	University of British Columbia	Vancouver, British Columbia, Canada	Active	
134	**Epsilon Xi**	2020	Saint Joseph's University	Philadelphia, Pennsylvania	Active	
135	**Epsilon Omicron**	2022	High Point University	High Point, North Carolina	Active	
136	**Epsilon Pi**	2022	Marshall B. Ketchum University	Fullerton, California	Active	
137	**Epsilon Rho**	2022	Medical College of Wisconsin	Milwaukee, Wisconsin	Active	
138	**Epsilon Sigma**	2022	William Carey University	Hattiesburg, Mississippi	Active	
