= List of Rho Chi chapters =

North American honor society chapters

Rho Chi is a North American pharmacy honor society. Following is a list of its chapters, with active chapters in bold and inactive chapters and institutions in italics.

Chapter	Charter date and range	Institution	Location	Status	Ref.
**Alpha**	1922	University of Michigan	Ann Arbor, Michigan	Active	
**Beta**	1922	Oregon State University	Corvallis, Oregon	Active	
**Gamma**	1922	University of Oklahoma	Norman, Oklahoma	Active	
**Delta**	1923	University of Iowa	Iowa City, Iowa	Active	
**Epsilon**	1925	Washington State University	Spokane, Washington	Active	(Note: Washington State University's Pharmacy program is located on two campuses.)
**Epsilon**	1925	Washington State University	Yakima, Washington	Active	(Note: Washington State University's Pharmacy program is located on two campuses.)
**Zeta**	1925	Auburn University	Auburn, Alabama	Active	
**Eta**	1925	University of Wisconsin–Madison	Madison, Wisconsin	Active	
**Theta**	1925	University of Southern California	Los Angeles, California	Active	
**Iota**	1928	University of Florida	Gainesville, Florida	Active	
**Kappa**	1928	North Dakota State University	Fargo, North Dakota	Active	
**Lambda**	1929	Virginia Commonwealth University	Richmond, Virginia	Active	
**Mu**	1930	University of Minnesota	Duluth, Minnesota	Active	(Note: Minnesota's Pharmacy program is located on two campuses.)
**Mu**	1930	University of Minnesota	Minneapolis, Minnesota	Active	(Note: Minnesota's Pharmacy program is located on two campuses.)
**Nu**	1930	University of Texas at Austin	Austin, Texas	Active	
**Xi**	1929	University of North Carolina at Chapel Hill	Chapel Hill, North Carolina	Active	
**Omicron**	1930	University of Maryland, Baltimore	Baltimore, Maryland	Active	
Pi	1931	North Pacific College	Portland, Oregon	Inactive	(Note: Note, departments of North Pacific College were merged into other schools, such as the University of Oregon, in 1945. This college is now closed as an independent entity.)
**Rho**	1931	University of Washington	Seattle, Washington	Active	
Sigma	1931	Case Western Reserve University	Cleveland, Ohio	Inactive	
**Tau**	1931	South Dakota State University	Brookings, South Dakota	Active	
**Upsilon**	1934	Ohio State University	Columbus, Ohio	Active	
**Phi**	1934	University of Illinois Chicago	Chicago, Illinois	Active	
**Chi**	1937	University of Mississippi	University, Mississippi	Active	
**Psi**	1939	Massachusetts College of Pharmacy and Health Sciences	Boston, Massachusetts	Active	
**Omega**	1940	University at Buffalo	Buffalo, New York	Active	
**Alpha Alpha**	1941	Creighton University	Omaha, Nebraska	Active	
**Alpha Beta**	1941	Duquesne University	Pittsburgh, Pennsylvania	Active	
**Alpha Gamma**	1942	University of Connecticut	Storrs, Connecticut	Active	
Alpha Delta	1942	Loyola University New Orleans	New Orleans, Louisiana	Inactive	
**Alpha Epsilon**	1943	University of Nebraska Medical Center	Omaha, Nebraska	Active	
**Alpha Zeta**	1945	Purdue University	West Lafayette, Indiana	Active	
**Alpha Eta**	1947	Rutgers University–New Brunswick	Piscataway, New Jersey	Active	
**Alpha Theta**	1948	University of Colorado Denver	Denver, Colorado	Active	
Alpha Iota	1948	Medical University of South Carolina	Charleston, South Carolina	Inactive	(Note: The departments of North Pacific College were merged into other schools, such as the University of Oregon, in 1945. This college is now closed as an independent entity.)
**Alpha Kappa**	1949	University of Georgia	Athens, Georgia	Active	
**Alpha Lambda**	1949	University of California, San Francisco	San Francisco, California	Active	
**Alpha Mu**	1949	West Virginia University	Morgantown, West Virginia	Active	
**Alpha Nu**	1948	University of Tennessee Health Science Center	Memphis, Tennessee	Active	
**Alpha Xi**	1949	University of Kentucky	Lexington, Kentucky	Active	
**Alpha Omicron**	1950	University of Pittsburgh	Pittsburgh, Pennsylvania	Active	
Alpha Pi	1951	University of Arizona	Tucson, Arizona	Inactive	
**Alpha Rho**	1951	University of Kansas	Lawrence, Kansas	Active	
**Alpha Sigma**	1951	Drake University	Des Moines, Iowa	Active	
**Alpha Tau**	1951	University of the Sciences	Philadelphia, Pennsylvania	Active	
**Alpha Upsilon**	1951	Idaho State University	Pocatello, Idaho	Active	
**Alpha Phi**	1953	Butler University	Indianapolis, Indiana	Active	
**Alpha Chi**	1953	Wayne State University	Detroit, Michigan	Active	
**Alpha Psi**	1954	University of Arizona	Tucson, Arizona	Active	
**Alpha Omega**	1954	University of Missouri–Kansas City	Kansas City, Missouri	Active	
Beta Alpha	1954	University of South Carolina	Columbia, South Carolina	Inactive	
**Beta Beta**	1954	Samford University	Homewood, Alabama	Active	
Beta Gamma	1954	Columbia University	New York City, New York	Inactive	
**Beta Delta**	1954	St. John's University	Jamaica, Queens, New York	Active	
**Beta Epsilon**	1955	University of Utah	Salt Lake City, Utah	Active	
Beta Zeta	1955	George Washington University	Washington, D.C.	Inactive	
**Beta Eta**	1955	University of Toledo	Toledo, Ohio	Active	
**Beta Theta**	1955	Long Island University	Brooklyn, New York	Active	
**Beta Iota**	1955	University of Arkansas at Little Rock	Little Rock, Arkansas	Active	
**Beta Kappa**	1955	University of Health Sciences and Pharmacy in St. Louis	St. Louis, Missouri	Active	
**Beta Lambda**	1955	Temple University	Philadelphia, Pennsylvania	Active	
**Beta Mu**	1955	Ferris State University	Big Rapids, Michigan	Active	
**Beta Nu**	1956	University of Cincinnati	Cincinnati, Ohio	Active	
Beta Xi	1956	Fordham University	New York City, New York	Inactive	
**Beta Omicron**	1958	University of Houston	Houston, Texas	Active	
**Beta Pi**	1959	University of Rhode Island	Kingston, Rhode Island	Active	
**Beta Rho**	1960	University of Montana	Missoula, Montana	Active	
**Beta Sigma**	1960	Howard University	Washington, D.C.	Active	
**Beta Tau**	1961	Northeastern University	Boston, Massachusetts	Active	
**Beta Upsilon**	1961	Southwestern Oklahoma State University	Weatherford, Oklahoma	Active	
**Beta Phi**	1961	University of Wyoming	Laramie, Wyoming	Active	
**Beta Chi**	1961	University of Louisiana at Monroe	Monroe, Louisiana	Active	
**Beta Psi**	1962	Ohio Northern University	Ada, Ohio	Active	
**Beta Omega**	1964	University of the Pacific	Stockton, California	Active	
**Gamma Alpha**	1967	Mercer University	Macon, Georgia	Active	
**Gamma Beta**	1968	University of New Mexico	Albuquerque, New Mexico	Active	
**Gamma Gamma**	1976	Albany College of Pharmacy and Health Sciences	Albany, New York	Active	
**Gamma Delta**	1977	Texas Southern University	Houston, Texas	Active	
**Gamma Epsilon**	1977	Xavier University of Louisiana	New Orleans, Louisiana	Active	
**Gamma Zeta**	1980	Florida A&M University	Tallahassee, Florida	Active	
**Gamma Eta**	1986	University of Puerto Rico, Medical Sciences Campus	San Juan, Puerto Rico	Active	
**Gamma Theta**	1991	Nova Southeastern University	Fort Lauderdale, Florida	Active	
**Gamma Iota**	1994	Campbell University	Buies Creek, North Carolina	Active	
**Gamma Kappa**	1995	Midwestern University	Downers Grove, Illinois	Active	
**Gamma Lambda**	2000	Wilkes University	Wilkes-Barre, Pennsylvania	Active	
**Gamma Mu**	2000	Texas Tech University at Amarillo	Amarillo, Texas	Active	
**Gamma Nu**	2001	Midwestern University in Glendale	Glendale, Arizona	Active	
**Gamma Xi**	2002	Hampton University	Hampton, Virginia	Active	
**Gamma Omicron**	2003	Shenandoah University	Winchester, Virginia	Active	
**Gamma Pi**	2003	Massachusetts College of Pharmacy and Health Sciences	Boston, Massachusetts	Active	(Note: MCPHS' Pharmacy program is located on three campuses.)
**Gamma Pi**	2003	Massachusetts College of Pharmacy and Health Sciences	Manchester, New Hampshire	Active	(Note: MCPHS' Pharmacy program is located on three campuses.)
**Gamma Pi**	2003	Massachusetts College of Pharmacy and Health Sciences	Worcester, Massachusetts	Active	(Note: MCPHS' Pharmacy program is located on three campuses.)
**Gamma Rho**	2004	Loma Linda University	Loma Linda, California	Active	
**Gamma Sigma**	2005	Western University of Health Sciences	Pomona, California	Active	
**Gamma Tau**	2005	Lake Erie College of Osteopathic Medicine	Erie, Pennsylvania	Active	
**Gamma Upsilon**	2005	South University	Savannah, Georgia	Active	
**Gamma Phi**	2005	Wingate University	Wingate, North Carolina	Active	
**Gamma Chi**	2006	Palm Beach Atlantic University	West Palm Beach, Florida	Active	
**Gamma Psi**	2008	South Carolina College of Pharmacy	Columbia, South Carolina	Active	
**Gamma Omega**	2008	Irma Lerma Rangel College of Pharmacy	Kingsville, Texas	Active	
**Delta Alpha**	2008	Appalachian College of Pharmacy	Oakwood, Virginia	Active	
**Delta Beta**	2008	Southern Illinois University Edwardsville	Edwardsville, Illinois	Active	
**Delta Gamma**	2010	University of British Columbia	Vancouver, British-Columbia, Canada	Active	
**Delta Delta**	2011	Touro University California	Vallejo, California	Active	
**Delta Epsilon**	2011	East Tennessee State University	Johnson City, Tennessee	Active	
**Delta Zeta**	2011	St. John Fisher University	Rochester, New York	Active	
**Delta Eta**	2011	University of the Incarnate Word	San Antonio, Texas	Active	
**Delta Theta**	2012	University of Findlay	Findlay, Ohio	Active	
**Delta Iota**	2012	University of Hawaiʻi at Hilo	Hilo, Hawaii	Active	
**Delta Kappa**	2012	Sullivan University	Louisville, Kentucky	Active	
**Delta Lambda**	2012	University of Charleston	Charleston, West Virginia	Active	
**Delta Mu**	2013	Belmont University	Nashville, Tennessee	Active	
**Delta Nu**	2013	Touro University System	New York City, New York	Active	
**Delta Xi**	2013	Chicago State University	Chicago, Illinois	Active	
**Delta Omicron**	2013	Harding University	Searcy, Arkansas	Active	
**Delta Pi**	2013	Lipscomb University	Nashville, Tennessee	Active	
**Delta Rho**	2013	Union University	Jackson, Tennessee	Active	
**Delta Sigma**	2014	University of Maryland Eastern Shore	Princess Anne, Maryland	Active	
**Delta Tau**	2014	Notre Dame of Maryland University	Baltimore, Maryland	Active	
**Delta Upsilon**	2014	California Northstate University College of Pharmacy	Elk Grove, California	Active	
**Delta Phi**	2014	Northeast Ohio Medical University	Rootstown, Ohio	Active	
**Delta Chi**	2014	University of New England	Portland, Maine	Active	
**Delta Psi**	2014	Regis University	Denver, Colorado	Active	
**Delta Omega**	2015	Presbyterian College	Clinton, South Carolina	Active	
**Epsilon Alpha**	2015	University of Saint Joseph	West Hartford, Connecticut	Active	
**Epsilon Beta**	2015	D'Youville University	Buffalo, New York	Active	
**Epsilon Gamma**	2015	Husson University	Bangor, Maine	Active	
**Epsilon Delta**	2015	Philadelphia College of Osteopathic Medicine	Philadelphia, Pennsylvania	Active	
**Epsilon Epsilon**	2016	Thomas Jefferson University	Philadelphia, Pennsylvania	Active	
**Epsilon Zeta**	2015	Concordia University Wisconsin	Mequon, Wisconsin	Active	
**Epsilon Eta**	2016	South College	Knoxville, Tennessee	Active	
**Epsilon Theta**	2016	Roosevelt University	Schaumburg, Illinois	Active	
**Epsilon Iota**	2016	Western New England University	Springfield, Massachusetts	Active	
**Epsilon Kappa**	2016	University of South Florida	Tampa, Florida	Active	
**Epsilon Lambda**	2016	Rosalind Franklin University of Medicine and Science	North Chicago, Illinois	Active	
**Epsilon Mu**	2017	Cedarville University	Cedarville, Ohio	Active	
**Epsilon Nu**	2017	Manchester University School of Health Sciences	Fort Wayne, Indiana	Active	
**Epsilon Xi**	2018	Marshall University	Huntington, West Virginia	Active	
**Epsilon Omicron**	2018	Fairleigh Dickinson University	Florham Park, New Jersey	Active	
**Epsilon Pi**	2019	UNT Health Fort Worth	Fort Worth, Texas	Active	
**Epsilon Rho**	2019	Chapman University	Orange, California	Active	
