= Jerry M. Wallace =

American theologian, ordained minister and academic administrator

4th President of Campbell University 0
- In office May 2003 – July 2015
- Preceded by: Norman Adrian Wiggins
- Succeeded by: J. Bradley Creed

Personal details
- Born: Jerry McLain Wallace; April 1935 (age 91) Rockingham, North Carolina
- Education: East Carolina University (BA); Southeastern Baptist Theological Seminary (BD, ThM); North Carolina State University (MS, EdD)
- Profession: Professor
- Website: Administration

Jerry McLain Wallace (born April 1935) is an American theologian, ordained minister, and academic administrator who served as the 4th president of Campbell University in Buies Creek, North Carolina.

== Early life and education ==
A native of Rockingham, North Carolina, Wallace earned a Bachelor of Arts degree in English and Government from East Carolina University. An ordained Baptist minister, Wallace received the Bachelor of Divinity and Master of Theology degrees from Southeastern Baptist Theological Seminary. He also earned a Master of Science in Sociology and Doctor of Education in Higher Education Administration, both from North Carolina State University.

== Career ==
Wallace first joined the faculty of Campbell University in 1970, later serving as the vice president for Academic Affairs and provost from 1984 to 2001 before becoming president in 2003.

In 2011, the Campbell University School of Osteopathic Medicine was established and named in Wallace's honor. Wallace retired in 2015, and was succeeded by theologian and minister J. Bradley Creed.

Preceded by Norman Adrian Wiggins	President, Campbell University; 2003 - 2015	Succeeded by J. Bradley Creed
