= Kivett Hall =

College building in North Carolina

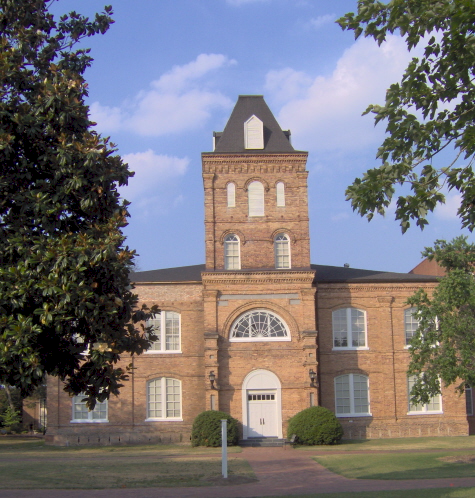
- Kivett Hall

General information
- Type: Educational
- Location: Buies Creek, North Carolina
- Completed: November 2, 1903; 122 years ago
- Owner: Campbell University

Kivett Hall is the oldest building on the campus of Campbell University in Buies Creek, North Carolina. The building has long served as the icon of the university and was noted for its bell tower that chimed every quarter-hour. The bell is now a fixture of Campbell football games.

== History ==
The need for Kivett Hall arose after most of the buildings on the campus of Buies Creek Academy, the forerunner of Campbell University, located in Buies Creek, North Carolina, were destroyed by fire. Founded by the Reverend James Archibald Campbell in 1887, the academy grew and eventually consisted of several buildings, all constructed of wood. On Wednesday night December 20, 1900, a fire destroyed many buildings, including the main classroom building. Kivett was completed on November 2, 1903, and in its early days served as the primary building of the academy, a rural school that educated children from kindergarten to the 12th grade.

The building was named for Zachary Taylor Kivett, known to all as Z. T. Kivett, a relatively prosperous landowner, contractor and builder well established in the local community. He lived on his farm, the “plantation”, located on the other side of the Cape Fear River from Buies Creek with his wife Lillian Lee née. McNeill. At the time they had a large family consisting of Archibald Steward, 19; twins Hector Hendricks and Hugh Herndon, 17; Virginia Elizabeth, 14; Caroline McNeill, 12; Louise McKay, 9; Neil McNeill, 6; Edward Henry, 3; and Robert Commack, 1. They had also lost two children in infancy Caroline McNeill, born in 1888 lived less than a year, and David born in 1890 lived only two days. During the ensuring years Z. T. and Lillian had three more children Willis Ervin, 1902, and twins again, Mary Herndon and Mildred McNeill, 1909. Eventually fathering 14 children, Z. T. was obviously not only prosperous but productive, so his future pledge of his family was not insignificant to Rev. Campbell.

In a handwritten letter to Dr. Joseph McKay, a trustee of the school, dated September 10, 1923, Kivett relates the details of his meeting with the Reverend Campbell the morning after the fire.

I am quite sure you are well acquainted with the general movement of affairs about Buies Creek Academy from its early struggle on through the passing years to the present high place it fills in the County and State. But as to details of every one's part in this advance, you perhaps are not so well acquainted, and would like to be a little better informed, as I judge from your desire to have some kind of a statement along this line of my own connections with the work.
Perhaps none of those connected with the school on the night of December 20, 1900 will ever forget how quickly 14 years of their labor and toil went up in smoke and drifted out of the community in lowering clouds and drizzling rain.
Two and a half years previous to that night I became connected with the school as builder of the "Big Wooden Tabernacle"; and for the last 26 years there has been no man, save J. A. Campbell, more thoroughly interested or more closely identified than your humble friend with the institution.
About daybreak of the morning after the fire of the night before I was aroused by the constant ringing of the "Phone" in my hall, and when I answered the call I found J. A. Campbell talking, and he informed me of the great loss he had sustained the night before.
Cape Fear River was between me and him that rainy morning and crossing was by flat. But when he asked for a consultation and plans for the future for the school, I reminded him that the "Big Wooden Tabernacle" could be fit up and used until a new building was built; and that I would cross the river at once to make plans with him.
I found him in the bed and discouraged to the limit; for it appeared to him, that his life work was blighted.
My first inquire was "Why are you in the bed?" and then a declaration, "I thought Campbells had Hump on them". And that declaration emphasized by declaring, "I am glad the building is burned". This same declaration was sent him in a few days, in a letter from Dr. Spilman, one of his strong friends.
We fit up the "Tabernacle" and the school went on as of old, while J. A. Campbell geared himself for the long and tremendous task of his life work, of establishing Buies Creek Academy.
It required about two months to settle down and get bearings, and then there was but little means to offer contractors to do the work. At this juncture Mr. Campbell informed me he had not been able to interest anyone enough to get them to take hold the undertaking and as he and I had "put over" the "Big Wooden Tabernacle" with little in sight two and a half years before, why not I help him again?
Right then, Dr. McKay, is when I, as you well know, staked my all on Buies Creek Academy. To this day, twenty four years afterward, do I well remember the time and place, that I put my hand in his, and promised my family and all my plantation if it required them, to rebuild in Brick a more suitable building. You, yourself, can judge as to what has been the outcome of the toil, worry and labor of my family, for you kept lovingly near to help and encourage. But why write these things to one who is so familiar with every move of people and things about Buies Creek.

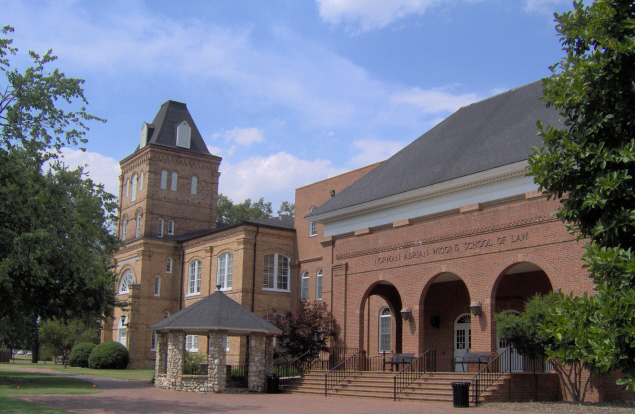
Kivett Hall with attached Wiggins Hall

Z. T. spent the remainder of the winter months working on plans for the new brick school building. A self-taught architect and structural engineer, some saw his proposed building as overly ambitious, ostentatious and out of scale. It was also over engineered with solid brick exterior and interior supporting walls. He estimated the construction cost of the new building at $15,000, which was not even remotely available. Nonetheless, he began digging the foundation in early 1901, and the cornerstone was laid on May 23, 1901.

As the primary construction material was to be of fire resistant brick, the bricks were to be funded by donations solicited by Rev. Campbell. He had printed 1,000 “Brick Envelopes” each to be filled with $5.00, enough to fund fifty bricks. The envelopes were distributed widely by students, friends and supporters. Prominent among these supporters was Mr. Josephus Daniels of the Raleigh News and Observer. He gave prominent coverage of the fire and rebuilding plans in the paper, and, through the paper, started a fund raising campaign when he wrote “Public spirited men ought to rally to his (Dr. Campbell's) assistance in rebuilding.” Indeed, the community did rally, donations were made, fund raising suppers were held, special church offerings were collected and slowly funds were available. Not an abundance, but enough to provide hope and to proceed with the construction project.

Work then slowed somewhat with the details for the materials for the project. Z. T. purchased land less a fourth of a mile from the construction site from Mr. Richard B. Crowder. On this land he set up a steam-powered saw mill and a brick kiln. Needing to be closer to the construction site, as he was the sole contractor and foreman, Z. T. also constructed a “shanty” on the site. Built of rough-cut wood, the one-room building was furnished with five bunks, wood-burning stove, washstand, shelving and benches. A porch across the front provided some shade, and a wood fence enclosed the front yard. Into this primitive accommodation Z. T. moved himself and his oldest sons Stewart, Herndon and Hendricks and his daughter Virginia in the summer of 1901. Virginia did the cooking and housekeeping for the men while they lived in the shanty.

By April 1902 they were ready to begin production of timbers and bricks for the construction of the new building. The sons would supervise the operation of the saw mill and the brick kiln, which operated 24 hours a day.

According to the April 5, 2007 edition of The Campbell Times, "Kivett got some extra help from a flood in May 1901, as a fully equipped sawmill floated downstream and was recovered after the flood waters receded." Everett McNeill Kivette's The McNeill’s Ferry Chronicle and Campbell University says, "If Z.T. was not being given a mill, he could surely entertain the idea – and that strongly – that God intended him to borrow it for a time."

For 28 months Z. T. and his family devoted themselves full-time to the construction project. They were assisted by the Buies Creek Academy students, by volunteers, and paid craftsmen, especially masons and carpenters.

Finally on November 2, 1903, the building was complete. The Catalogue of Buie's Creek Academy and Business College For The Scholastic Year 1902–1903 describes “Our New Building” as

Our new brick building is one of the most imposing and well arranged school buildings in the State, corner-stone of which was laid May 23rd, 1901. The main building is 92 feet (28 m) long, 70 feet (21 m) wide, with a wing on the rear 50 feet (15 m) long,- and 35 feet (11 m) wide, all two stories. The first floor contains four rooms each 35x40 feet, one room 35x35 feet, and three music rooms. The second story contains Society Halls 35x40 feet each and Commercial Halls 35x50 feet. On the front is a tower 20x20 feet, four stories, containing rooms for Telegraphy, Band Music, &c. On the rear is a similar tower, three stories, containing Art Hall, Library and Cloak room, with a basement for heating plant. The rooms are all well lighted, without cross lights, the furniture is all new, and one could hardly desire more favor- able conditions for study.

Around the time of the start of the construction, Rev. Campbell had written in the January–February 1901 edition of the Little River Record:

To Mr. Z. T. Kivett, who came and took charge of the matter of planning and pushing the work, to the students who spent their holidays in helping, to the citizens of the community, to the newspapers, and to friends one and all who in any way helped make it possible for the work to be done, we desire to return our sincere and heartfelt thanks.

As those words were true throughout the massive construction project, the new building was soon referred to as the Kivett Building. It was formally named Kivett Hall as Buies Creek Academy grew into Campbell College and then Campbell University. The building has served the surrounding community's various educational needs for generations, having been used as a grade school, high school, college classrooms, and since 1976, as the home of the Norman Adrian Wiggins School of Law and law library. Most recently in the 1990s, a new structure, Wiggins Memorial Library, was added to the east wall of Kivett and greatly expanded the Law School and law library.

The renovation of the structure was recognized at the time “as an example of adaptive renovation and historic preservation.” But such praise may have been made by those who did not have an understanding of the changes to the building. Interior partition masonry walls that provided support for upper floors and the roof structure were removed as were parts of flooring that provided bracing for the exterior walls. And though engineering remediation was attempted, time has brought much havoc on the building.

== Future ==
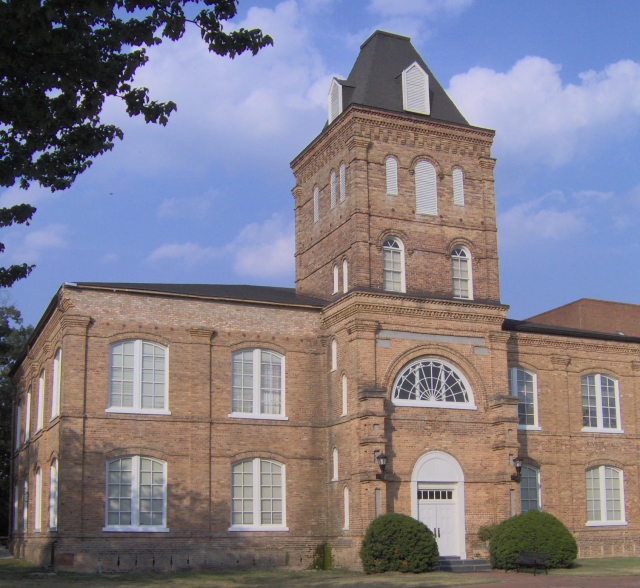
Kivett Hall, note the temporary upper facade on the building's west wing

Kivett Hall was completely renovated following the move of the Law School to Raleigh. Kivett currently houses the English Department, classrooms, as well the Old Law School library stacks were converted to be a part of the new Norman A. Wiggins Memorial Library which is housed in the adjacent building.
