= Leslie Campbell =

Leslie Campbell may refer to:

- Leslie D. Campbell Jr. (1925–2020), American lawyer and politician
- Leslie H. Campbell (1892–1970), president of Campbell University
- Leslie Campbell Parks, daughter of the photographer Gordon Parks
- Les Campbell (rugby league) (1879–?), New Zealand rugby league player
- Leslie Campbell (cricketer) (1902–1970), Australian cricketer
- Leslie Campbell (politician) (died 2026), Jamaican senator and cabinet minister
