= J. Bradley Creed =

American theologian, ordained minister and academic administrator

5th President of Campbell University
- In office July 1, 2015 – June 30, 2025
- Preceded by: Jerry M. Wallace
- Succeeded by: William M. Downs

Personal details
- Born: 1957 (age 68–69) Jacksonville, Texas, U.S.
- Education: Baylor University (BA); Southwestern Baptist Theological Seminary (M.Div, PhD)

J. Bradley Creed is an American theologian, church historian, ordained minister, and academic administrator, who served as the fifth president of Campbell University from 2015 to 2025, succeeding Jerry M. Wallace.

== Early life and education ==
Creed was born and raised in Jacksonville, Texas, where he graduated from Jacksonville High School in 1975. He earned a bachelor of arts in religion from Baylor University in 1979. He went on to earn a Master of Divinity and Ph.D from the Southwestern Baptist Theological Seminary in Fort Worth, where he was a teaching fellow in church history and pastor of Wheatland Baptist Church.

== Career ==
Creed joined the faculty of Northwestern State University in Natchitoches, Louisiana and accepted the pulpit of the First Baptist Church in 1988. In 1993, he returned to Baylor University as professor of Christian history and was made dean of the George W. Truett Theological Seminary in 1996. He moved to Samford University in 2001, working as a professor of religion and associate provost. He was promoted to provost in 2002 and selected for honoris causa membership into Omicron Delta Kappa. He was promoted to executive vice president in 2006.

Creed left Samford University in 2015 to become the fifth president of Campbell University. Creed retired in June 2025 and was succeeded by William M. Downs, the former president of Gardner-Webb University. He continued to reside in North Carolina in retirement.

== Personal life ==
Creed and his wife, Kathy, have three children: Caitlin, Charles and Carrie Grace.

Preceded by Jerry M. Wallace	President, Campbell University; 2015 - 2025	Succeeded by William M. Downs
