= Campbell University School of Education =

Coordinates: 35.4074°N 78.7393°W

- Type: Private
- Established: 1985
- Location: Buies Creek, North Carolina, USA
- Website: School of Education Homepage

The Campbell University School of Education was founded in 1985 and is located in Buies Creek, North Carolina. The School of Education is one of six schools that compose Campbell University.

The School of Education offers undergraduate and graduate programs of study in Education, Psychology, Social Work, Mental Health Counseling, and School Counseling.
