= James Archibald Campbell House =

Historic house in North Carolina, United States

- U.S. National Register of Historic Places
- Location within North Carolina Location within the United States
- Location: U.S. 421, Buies Creek, North Carolina
- Coordinates: 35°24′28″N 78°45′0″W
- Area: less than one acre
- Built: 1891
- NRHP reference No.: 77001001
- Added to NRHP: November 17, 1977

James Archibald Campbell House is a historic home located at Buies Creek, Harnett County, North Carolina. It was built in 1891, and is a 1 1/2-story, rectangular frame dwelling with projecting pavilions at the front corners of the main facade. It was the home of James Archibald Campbell (1862–1934) who founded Campbell University (originally Buies Creek Academy) in 1887.

It was listed on the National Register of Historic Places in 1977.
