= Leslie H. Campbell =

- Campbell pictured in Pine Burr 1946, Campbell yearbook

2nd President of Campbell University
- In office 1934–1967
- Preceded by: James Archibald Campbell
- Succeeded by: Norman Adrian Wiggins

Personal details
- Born: April 3, 1892; Harnett County, North Carolina
- Died: November 25, 1970 (aged 78); Harnett County, North Carolina

Leslie Hartwell Campbell (April 3, 1892 – November 25, 1970) was the 2nd president of Campbell University in Buies Creek, North Carolina.

== Biography ==
Dr. Campbell was the eldest son of Campbell University founder, James Archibald Campbell. His younger brother, Carlyle, also became a college president, serving Meredith College in Raleigh, North Carolina in that capacity. Dr. Campbell was a 1911 graduate of Wake Forest College and was an earlier graduate of Buies Creek Academy, the forerunner of Campbell University. Under Dr. Campbell's leadership, Campbell Junior College became a four-year liberal arts college in 1961. He died on November 25, 1970.

Preceded by James Archibald Campbell	President, Campbell University; 1934 - 1967	Succeeded by Norman Adrian Wiggins
