= Larkin Community Hospital =

Coordinates: 25.7055856°N 80.293116°W

- Larkin Health System
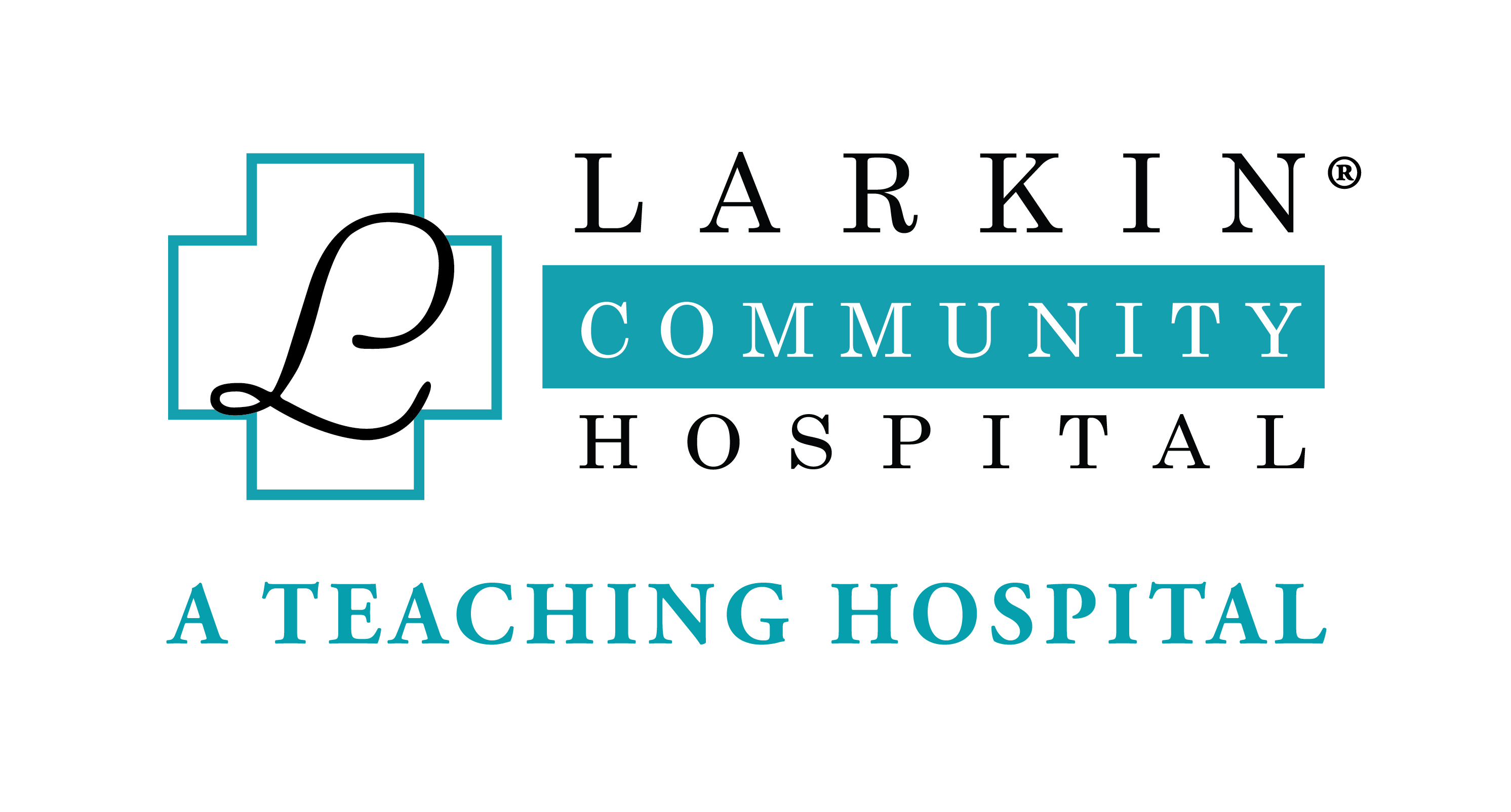

Geography
- Location: 7031 Southwest 62nd Avenue, South Miami, Florida, U.S., Miami metropolitan area, Florida, U.S.

Organisation
- Type: Teaching

Services
- Beds: 146

Links
- Website: larkinhealth.com
- Lists: Hospitals in U.S.

Larkin Community Hospital (LCH) is a for-profit 146-bed general medical, surgical and psychiatric teaching hospital in South Miami, Florida. In the last year with available data, LCH had about 7,523 emergency department visits and 5,792 admissions. Physicians at the hospital performed 794 inpatient and 739 outpatient surgeries.

LCH is the only hospital in Miami-Dade County, Florida with an Area of Critical Need designation by the Florida Board of Medicine. The hospital is accredited by the Joint Commission on Accreditation of Healthcare Organizations (JCAHO).

The hospital is part of Larkin Health System, an integrated healthcare delivery system accredited by the Joint Commission with locations in South Miami, Hialeah and Hollywood, Florida. This network of acute care hospitals provide healthcare services, including inpatient and outpatient services, and home health agencies in Miami-Dade and Broward County.

== History ==
The hospital was known as Larkin General Hospital and owned by Dr. John T. MacDonald Health Systems, Inc. until 1992 when HealthSouth purchased the hospital from the health system and renamed it HealthSouth Larkin Hospital. HealthSouth's purchase included Doctors' Hospital, Larkin's sister hospital in Coral Gables. HealthSouth sold Larkin to a group of private investors in 1997 and the hospital was renamed Larkin Community Hospital.

In 2013 LCH was named Top Urban Hospital by The Leapfrog Group.

In March 2014, LCH began accepting applicants for its new Advance Education in General Dentistry (AEGD) residency program.

In February 2016, Larkin Community Hospital acquired Palm Springs General Hospital now called Larkin Community Hospital Palm Springs Campus.

== Services ==
The Miami Neuroscience Center at Larkin offers Gamma Knife® therapy. Gamma Knife is a non-invasive neurological procedure used to treat brain tumors, head and neck cancer, and neurological conditions such as trigeminal neuralgia and arteriovenous malformations.

The Dermatology Center at Larkin provides care for dermatological conditions, such as immunobullous disorders, collagen vascular diseases and papulosquamous disorders. The center also treats cutaneous T-cell lymphoma, and chronic graft vs host disease. This center is equipped with photopheresis, hydrotherapy and phototherapy units.

The Larkin Outpatient Multi Specialty Center offers services in a variety of specialities, including: neuromusculoskeletal medicine, sports medicine, orthopedics, cardiology, hematology, and oncology.

== Graduate medical education ==
Larkin Community Hospital operates a number of residency training and fellowship programs for newly graduated physicians. The residencies train physicians specializing in: dermatology, internal medicine, neurology, ophthalmology, physical medicine and rehabilitation, psychiatry, radiology, family medicine, gastroenterology, rheumatology, hematology & oncology, and surgery. All programs are accredited by the Accreditation Council for Graduate Medical Education (ACGME). LCH also operates podiatry and dentistry residency programs. As of 2019, the hospital had 350 medical residents in 30 different programs.

The resident physicians at the Larkin Community Hospital obtain training and experience working at affiliated training sites, including:

- Nicklaus Children's Hospital, Miami, Florida
- Nationwide Children's Hospital, Columbus, Ohio
- Borinquen Health Care Center, Miami, Florida
- Miami Beach Community Health Center, Miami, Florida
- Community Health of South Florida (CHI), Miami, Florida
- Jessie Trice Health Community Health Center, Miami, Florida

== Campus ==
Larkin Community Hospital is located at 7031 Southwest 62nd Avenue South Miami, Florida 33143. Larkin Community Hospital acquired Palm Springs General Hospital in 2016, which is now the Palm Springs Campus of Larkin Community Hospital.

In April 2013, LCH purchased a 43-acre (17 ha) parcel of land that the hospital intends to use for a new osteopathic medical school campus. LCH also plans to move its current nursing school to that new campus, and open future programs in pharmacy and dentistry.

== See also ==
- Larkin University, whose startup was initiated by Larkin Community Hospital but which is a separate, non-profit organization
