= Larkin Community Hospital Palm Springs Campus =

- Larkin Health System
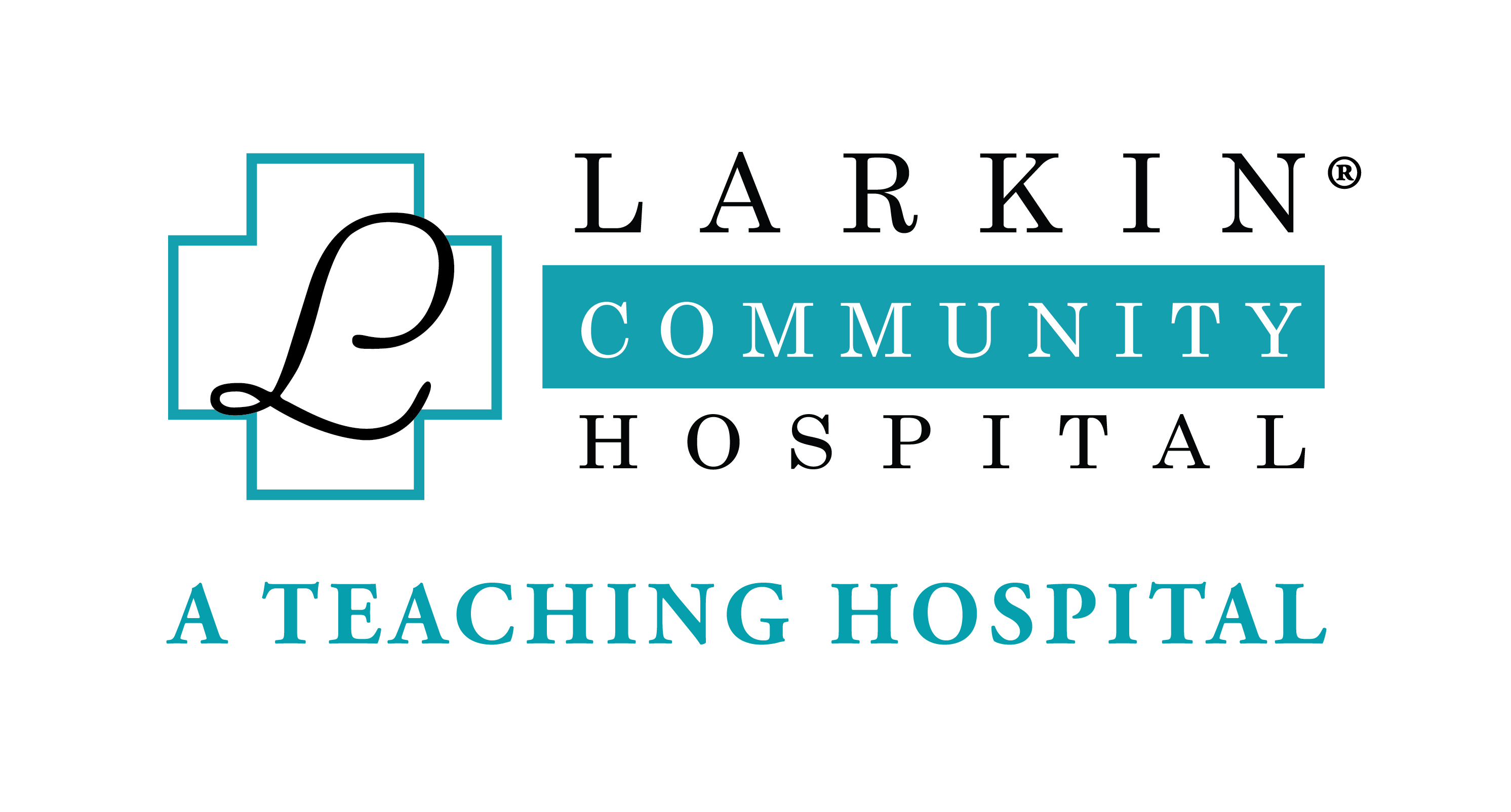

Geography
- Location: 1475 W 49th St, Hialeah, Miami-Dade, Florida, United States
- Coordinates: 25.868767°N 80.312234°W

Organization
- Care system: Medicare (US), Medicaid
- Type: Teaching

Services
- Standards: The Joint Commission
- Emergency department: Yes
- Beds: 247

History
- Former name: Palm Springs General Hospital
- Opened: 1965

Links
- Website: larkinhealth.com
- Lists: Hospitals in Florida

Larkin Community Hospital (Formerly Palm Springs Campus) is a 247-bed acute care hospital located on a 15-acre campus in Hialeah, Florida. Services include orthopedic surgery (hips, knees, shoulders), cardiac implants, pacemakers, interventional radiological procedures such as endovascular aneurysm repair of abdominal aortic aneuryisms (AAA). The hospital is also a designated Statutory Teaching hospital and Primary Stroke Center.

== History ==
In 1965, the hospital opened as Palm Springs General Hospital in what was then the rural outskirts of Hialeah in northwest Miami-Dade County, Florida. Due to the rapid influx of Hispanic-Americans, the hospital became largely bilingual in both Spanish and English, as well as Haitian Creole.

The former Palm Springs General Hospital underwent several renovations and expansion. In 1995, the intensive care unit was completely renovated, and in 2004, a 24-bed emergency department was built alongside the hospital. Over time, its outpatient services and GI departments were expanded, and a laparoscopic surgery center was opened. In 2013, a cardiac catheterization unit was opened.

In February 2016, Larkin Health System (an integrated healthcare delivery system accredited by the Joint Commission with locations in South Miami, Hialeah and Hollywood, Florida) acquired Palm Springs General Hospital. The name was changed to Larkin Community Hospital Palm Springs Campus.

== Services ==
The hospital offers endovascular repair of abdominal aortic aneurysms, which may lead to shorter hospital stays compared to the traditional open surgery.

== Acquisition ==
In February 2016, the hospital was sold to another Miami health care provider, Larkin Community Hospital, for $40 million. Larkin's other hospital is in South Miami.
