= Campbell University School of Pharmacy =

Pharmacy school in North Carolina, U.S.

Coordinates: 35.4104°N 78.7385°W

Campbell University College of Pharmacy & Health Sciences
- Maddox Hall
- Type: Private
- Established: 1985
- Dean: Dr. Jeffrey Mercer
- Location: Buies Creek, North Carolina, US
- Website: cphs.campbell.edu

The Campbell University College of Pharmacy & Health Sciences is the pharmacy school of Campbell University in Buies Creek, North Carolina.

== History ==
Founded in 1985, the College is one of seven schools that compose Campbell University. In 2009, the school's name was changed to Campbell University College of Pharmacy and Health Sciences.

The Campbell University College of Pharmacy & Health Sciences launched a physician assistant program in August 2011, a public health program in August 2012, a physical therapy program in January 2014, and an undergraduate nursing program in August 2014.
