= Norman Adrian Wiggins =

President of Campbell University

- Wiggins pictured in Pine Burr 1968, Campbell yearbook

3rd President of Campbell University
- In office June 6, 1967 – 2003
- Preceded by: Leslie Hartwell Campbell
- Succeeded by: Jerry M. Wallace

Personal details
- Born: February 6, 1924 Burlington, North Carolina
- Died: August 1, 2007 (aged 83) Winston-Salem, North Carolina
- Education: Campbell University (AA); Wake Forest University (BA, LLB); Columbia Law School (LLM, SJD)

Norman Adrian Wiggins (February 6, 1924 – August 1, 2007) was the third president of Campbell University in Buies Creek, North Carolina.

== Early life and education ==
He was born in Burlington, North Carolina on February 6, 1924.

In 1942, Wiggins enrolled in Campbell College, which was 70 miles from his home. In 1943, he served in the United States Marine Corps in the Pacific during World War II. After returning to Campbell in 1947, he went on to earn his Associate of Arts degree. He also met the love of his life, Mildred Harmon, and married her on April 14, 1948. By 1950, he had earned a Bachelor of Arts (magna cum laude) from Wake Forest College. In 1952, he graduated with a Bachelor of Laws (cum laude) from Wake Forest College School of Law. In his lifetime, he achieved a Master of Laws and a Doctor of Juridical Science from Columbia Law School.

== Career ==
On June 6, 1967, Wiggins became president of what was then known as Campbell College. He would remain in the position until 2003, when he retired at 79 and was honored with the title of chancellor. During his tenure, his passionate leadership inspired the establishment of five professional schools, which led to Campbell College's transformation into a university in 1979. Campbell now enrolls roughly 10,000 students, making it one of the largest Baptist universities in the country.

The Norman Adrian Wiggins School of Law was named after him.

== Death ==
Wiggins died in a Winston-Salem hospital of complications from lymphoma. He had taken a short leave as university president in 2001 after being diagnosed with that form of cancer. He was survived by Millie Wiggins, his wife of more than 50 years.

Preceded by Leslie Hartwell Campbell	President, Campbell University; 1967–2003	Succeeded by Jerry M. Wallace
