= Campbell University School of Osteopathic Medicine =

Osteopathic medical school of Campbell University

Campbell University Jerry M. Wallace School of Osteopathic Medicine (CUSOM)
- Other name: CUSOM
- Motto in English: Mind Body Spirit
- Type: Private medical school
- Established: 2011
- Parent institution: Campbell University
- Affiliations: Baptist
- President: William M. Downs
- Provost: Michael L. Adams
- Dean: David L. Tolentino
- Students: 162 per class
- Location: Lillington, North Carolina, United States; 35°24′22″N 78°45′20″W
- Campus: Rural, 850-acre (3.4 km^{2}) Health Sciences Campus
- Colors: Orange & black
- Sporting affiliations: NCAA Division I
- Mascot: Gaylord the Camel
- Website: medicine.campbell.edu

The Campbell University Jerry M. Wallace School of Osteopathic Medicine (CUSOM) is a private medical school in Lillington, North Carolina. It is one of seven schools at Campbell University.

CUSOM is accredited by the American Osteopathic Association's Commission on Osteopathic College Accreditation. Graduates of CUSOM receive a Doctor of Osteopathic Medicine degree (D.O.). The inaugural class matriculated in 2013 and graduated in 2017.

== History ==
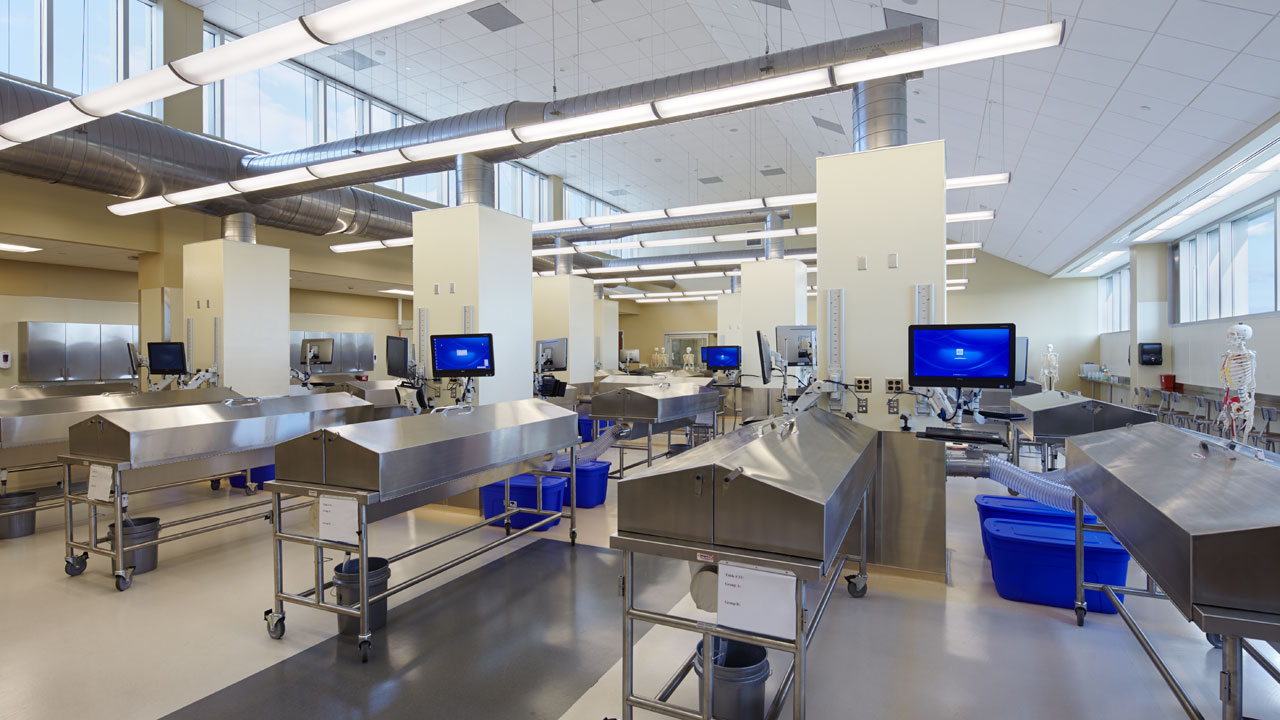
Anatomy Lab

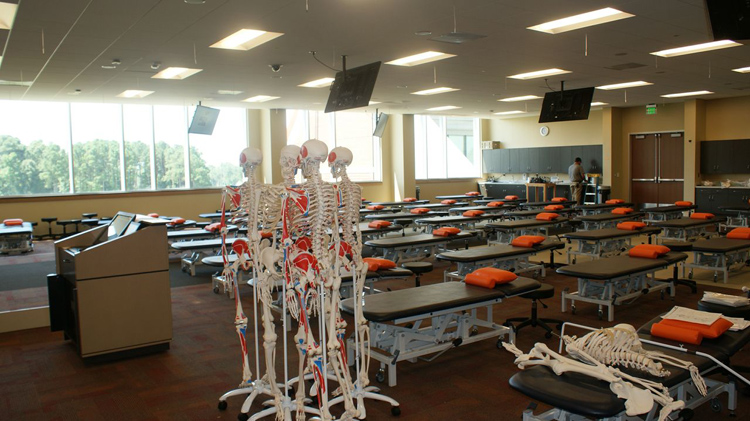
Osteopathic Manipulative Medicine Lab

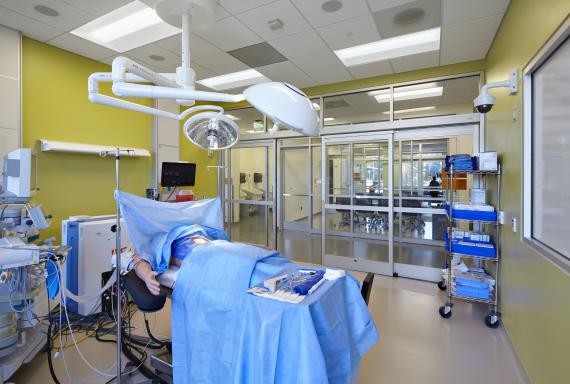
Simulation Lab

The Campbell University Jerry M. Wallace School of Osteopathic Medicine welcomed the inaugural class in August 2013. The school was awarded accreditation from the American Osteopathic Association's Commission on Osteopathic College Accreditation (COCA), in April 2017.

== Campus ==
The medical school's main building, a 96,500-square-foot facility located on the university's Health Sciences Campus, was estimated to have a start-up and build cost of $60 million. It is North Carolina's first new medical school to open in 35 years and is projected to have a regional economic growth of 1,158 new jobs and $300 million in its first 10-years of operation.

== Academics ==
Students at the medical school complete the first two years of training at the main campus in rural Harnett County, and the third and fourth years of training at various clinics and hospitals in the state. The school has a partnership with Southeastern Regional Medical Center, Cape Fear Valley Medical Center, Wayne Memorial Hospital, Sampson Regional Medical Center, Novant Health Rowan Medical Center, WakeMed, Carteret Health Medical Center and the Harnett Health System establishing clerkships for 3rd and 4th year rotations as well as residencies for Campbell students.

On August 1, 2014, the medical school received its first research grant from the National Institutes of Health and the National Cancer Institute, amounting to $300,000.

== See also ==
- List of medical schools in the United States
