= Neuromusculoskeletal medicine =

Subspeciality within osteopathic medicine

Neuromusculoskeletal medicine (NMM), now more formally known as osteopathic neuromusculoskeletal medicine (ONMM), is a medical specialty of American osteopathic medicine. Physicians trained in the specialty focus on the clinical evaluation and management of disorders of the neuromusculoskeletal system and its related visceral and somatic structures. Both American DOs and MDs have the option to train and practice in any of the medical specialties and subspecialties. Neuromusculoskeletal medicine is a specialty which is dominated by DOs, but MDs may also become certified. ONMM physicians complete residency training that includes advanced training on the integration of osteopathic principles into inpatient and outpatient care. They have specialized expertise in the indications, risks, benefits, and application of osteopathic manipulative medicine (OMM) for treatment of patients with neuromusculoskeletal and visceral disorders.

== Osteopathic manipulative medicine ==
All osteopathic medical students receive training in OMM, a type of manual medicine specific to the osteopathic profession. OMM involves a physical examination to identify somatic dysfunction, then treatment of the somatic dysfunction using osteopathic manipulative treatment (OMT). Somatic dysfunction manifests as tenderness, asymmetry, restricted range of motion, or tissue texture abnormalities and indicates impaired or altered functioning of the body's framework. OMT is the therapeutic application of manual techniques specific to the type of somatic dysfunction present. Because somatic dysfunction can manifest in various ways, OMT includes a wide variety of technique modalities, from gentle soft tissue techniques to rapid thrusting techniques. The OMT aims to correct somatic dysfunction and improve symptoms and physiological function.

After graduation, osteopathic physicians may continue to use OMM as part of patient management in a variety of specialty disciplines. However, many osteopathic physicians do not personally provide OMT in their clinical practices. ONMM specialists utilize their advanced training to integrate osteopathic principles into patient management and personally provide OMM when clinically indicated.

== ONMM scope of practice ==
ONMM specialists most often see patients with musculoskeletal pain complaints. They provide full scope management for these conditions including OMM, prescription management, injections, stretches and exercises, lifestyle interventions, and will make specialty referrals when indicated. ONMM specialists also provide care for a wide variety of conditions. Some ONMM specialists provide inpatient services for hospitalized patients with conditions such as pneumonia and bowel dysfunction. These services include OMM to enhance the body's ability to recover from acute illnesses or injuries. Some ONMM providers focus on the integration of OMM in the management of special patient populations such as pregnant patients, newborns, and children.

== ONMM residency training ==
ONMM is a primary specialty, which means that physicians are trained in specialty-level care through accredited residency training in the discipline. When the American Osteopathic Organization first developed the ONMM specialty, it was known as the Certification of Special Proficiency of OMM (C-SPOMM). Later the name was changed to Neuromusculoskeletal Medicine/Osteopathic Manipulative Medicine (NMM/OMM), then finally ONMM. The American Council of Graduate Medical Education (ACGME) currently accredits ONMM residency programs. Accredited residency training is required for physicians to become board-certified as an ONMM specialist through the American Osteopathic Board of Neuromusculoskeletal Medicine.

Physicians who have already completed another residency, such as family medicine, may complete an ONMM residency as a second residency to advance their knowledge and skills on the integration of osteopathic principles into patient care. Upon successful completion of the ONMM residency requirements, these physicians are then also eligible for ONMM board certification.
