= Leslie Campbell (cricketer) =

Australian cricketer

Personal information
- Born: 14 October 1902; Sydney, Australia
- Died: 19 August 1970 (aged 67); Southport, Queensland, Australia
- Source: ESPNcricinfo, 24 December 2016

Leslie Campbell (14 October 1902 – 19 August 1970) was an Australian cricketer. He played two first-class matches for New South Wales in 1925/26.

== See also ==
- List of New South Wales representative cricketers
