= James Archibald Campbell =

Founder of Campbell University (1862-1934)

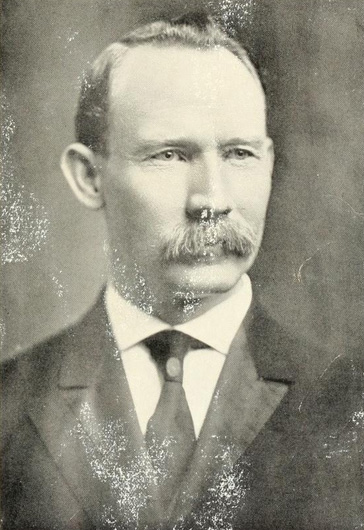
- Campbell in 1912

1st President of Campbell University
- In office 1887–1934
- Succeeded by: Leslie Hartwell Campbell

Personal details
- Born: January 13, 1862 near Angier, North Carolina
- Died: March 18, 1934 (aged 72) Buies Creek, North Carolina

James Archibald Campbell (January 13, 1862 – March 18, 1934) founded Campbell University (originally Buies Creek Academy) in Buies Creek, North Carolina, in 1887.

== Biography ==
Campbell was the father of Dr. Leslie Campbell, who would succeed him as president of Campbell College and Arthur Carlyle Campbell, who would become president of Meredith College in Raleigh, North Carolina. Although he first attended in 1886, J.A. Campbell received his Bachelor of Arts degree from Wake Forest College in 1911 on the same day as did his two sons. One of his grandchildren, Catherine Campbell King, resides across from the university he founded. He is buried at the Buies Creek Cemetery in Buies Creek.

His great-great grandson, John Leslie Campbell, also went to Wake Forest University, and then went on to be a professor at the University of Georgia.

== Legacy ==
The James Archibald Campbell House was listed on the National Register of Historic Places in 1977.

| Preceded by none | President, Campbell University; 1887 - 1934 | Succeeded by Leslie Hartwell Campbell |
