= Larkin University =

Private university in Miami Gardens, Florida, US

Coordinates: 25.943346132189617°N 80.20016805421282°W

- Former name: Larkin Health Science Institute (2013–2017)
- Motto: "Change Your Life"
- Type: Private university, not-for-profit
- Established: 2013; 13 years ago
- Chairman: Jack J. Michel
- President: Rudi H. Ettrich
- Location: Miami Gardens, Florida, United States
- Colors: Yellow & Blue
- Mascot: Lion
- Website: larkin.edu

Larkin University is a 501(c)(3) not-for-profit institution of higher education accredited by the Southern Association of Colleges and Schools Commission on Colleges (SACS-COC), founded in 2013 by Dr. Jack Michel MD and located in Miami Gardens, Florida.

The College of Biomedical Sciences offers three post-Baccalaureate Master's degree programs in Biomedical Sciences.

The College of Pharmacy is accredited by Accreditation Council for Pharmacy Education (ACPE) and offers a three-year Doctor of Pharmacy program (the only one of its kind in Florida), and graduated its inaugural class in May 2019. The Doctor of Pharmacy (PharmD) program's graduates from the Class of 2025 achieved a 77.8% first-time pass rate on the North American Pharmacist Licensure Examination (NAPLEX), according to aggregated data from the National Association of Boards of Pharmacy (NABP). Larkin University College of Pharmacy's Doctor of Pharmacy program is accredited by the Accreditation Council for Pharmacy Education

In 2025, Larkin University launched a Physician Assistant (PA) Program within its School of Physician Assistant Studies. The program prepares students to practice as physician assistants and participates in the Central Application Service for Physician Assistants (CASPA). The Accreditation Review Commission on Education for the Physician Assistant (ARC-PA) granted the program Accreditation-Provisional status in June 2025, a status that permits matriculation of the first cohort of students while the program continues progress toward full compliance with accreditation standards.

In early 2026, Larkin University announced that it is seeking accreditation for a new College of Osteopathic Medicine (COM) to help address physician shortages in South Florida. According to the announcement, the Jacqueline Nicole Michel College of Osteopathic Medicine is planned to be located on a future 48-acre campus in Naranja, Florida, near Homestead, with a targeted opening in Fall 2028 pending accreditation approval from the American Osteopathic Association's Commission on Osteopathic College Accreditation (COCA).

Larkin University’s School of Dental Medicine is located in Winter Garden, Florida, at the university’s Orlando branch campus. The Commission on Dental Accreditation granted the school’s Doctor of Dental Medicine (D.M.D.) program initial accreditation in August 2026. In November 2026, the Florida Commission for Independent Education authorized the Orlando branch campus and its four-year D.M.D. program. The university announced plans to enroll an inaugural class of 90 students in fall 2027.

Larkin University is regionally accredited by The Southern Association of Colleges and Schools Commission on Colleges (SACSCOC)

== See also ==
- Larkin Community Hospital, which initiated the startup of Larkin University
