= California Northstate University College of Pharmacy =

Private pharmacy college in Elk Grove, California

Coordinates: 38.406°N 121.481°W

California Northstate University College of Pharmacy is a pharmacy school located in Elk Grove, California in the Sacramento metropolitan area. It hosted its inaugural commencement ceremony on May 19, 2012, graduating its first class of students. The current dean is Dr. Xiaodong Feng.

Students at the university used a grant from the Vietnamese Cancer Awareness, Research and Education Society to conduct a symposium aimed at raising awareness among pharmacists of the prevalence of ovarian cancer in Vietnamese women.
