= Campbell University =

Christian university in Buies Creek, North Carolina, US

- Former names: Buies Creek Academy (1887–1926); Campbell Junior College (1926–1961); Campbell College (1961–1979)
- Motto: Ad astra per aspera (Latin)
- Motto in English: "To the stars through difficulties"
- Type: Private university
- Established: January 5, 1887; 139 years ago
- Accreditation: SACS
- Religious affiliation: Baptist State Convention of North Carolina (former)
- Academic affiliations: NAICU
- Endowment: $209.3 million (2021)
- Budget: $247.8 million
- President: William M. Downs
- Students: 5,000
- Location: Buies Creek, North Carolina, United States; 35°24′30″N 78°44′22″W
- Campus: 850 acres (3.4 km^{2}); Fringe town
- Other campuses: Camp Lejeune; Fort Bragg & Pope AFB; Lillington; Raleigh
- Colors: Orange and black
- Nickname: Fighting Camels
- Sporting affiliations: NCAA Division I FCS – CAA; CAA Football; SoCon
- Mascot: Gaylord the Camel
- Website: campbell.edu

Campbell University is a private Christian university in Buies Creek, North Carolina, United States. Campbell's main campus in Buies Creek is home to its College of Arts & Sciences, College of Pharmacy & Health Sciences, Divinity School, School of Education, Lundy-Fetterman School of Business, and the School of Engineering. Nearby is the Health Sciences Campus, home to the Jerry M. Wallace School of Osteopathic Medicine and the Catherine W. Wood School of Nursing. Campbell also operates a Raleigh Campus in downtown Raleigh, which is home to the Norman Adrian Wiggins School of Law as well as other programs. It maintains additional satellite campuses in Fort Bragg/Pope Air Force Base and at Camp Lejeune in North Carolina, and provides online classes through adult and online education. The university's athletic teams are named the Fighting Camels; there are 20 NCAA Division I varsity programs.

== History ==
=== Buies Creek Academy (1887–1926) ===
On January 5, 1887, James Archibald Campbell, a 26-year-old Baptist minister, welcomed 16 students to a small church in Buies Creek, North Carolina, for the first day of classes for the school he founded: Buies Creek Academy. By the end of the first term, there were 92 students.

In the beginning days, Buies Creek Academy had just three faculty members: J.A. Campbell was principal; A. E. Booth, a graduate of the Nashville Normal College, served as assistant and teacher of the Normal Department and Business College; and Cornelia F. Pearson was an assistant and teacher in the Primary Department.

The 1887 catalog lauded the rural location: "Being in the country, we avoid many of the temptations incident to towns and cities and save our patrons much extravagance in dress." The first commencement took place on May 20, 1887, and every student participated in the program. Josephus Daniels of Raleigh, an editor of the State Chronicle and later owner of The Raleigh News & Observer, delivered the main address.

Upon his return to Raleigh, he described his impressions of the academy: "Among my pleasant memories of a trip to Harnett, none are more cherished by me with more fondness than the enjoyment of the excellent commencement exercise at Buies Creek Academy. It was a rare feast. The scholars are not prodigies; they do not surpass other boys and girls in the state, but they recite with ease, enunciate with distinctiveness, and gave choice sections of music and evidence the good training they had received. There was an absence of straining after effect, which was refreshing. There was simplicity and a regard for the fitness of things that are charming. There was an order and arrangement that showed a thoughtful and sensible management. I congratulate the people of Harnett on the excellent advantages Buies Creek Academy offers for the education of the children of the rising generation."

The beginning of the 20th Century ushered in tremendous hardship for the young school. On the evening of December 20, 1900, a suspicious fire destroyed the academy and all the buildings except for the large wooden tabernacle. Awakened at 3:30 a.m. to witness the destruction, J.A. Campbell recalled: "When I ran up to the fire, the terrible fire, that was burning down chances for poor boys and girls, and I knew that I could not build again ... the flames that destroyed the labor of years [...] the only hope for hundreds of boys and girls was being swept away, I could not bear up longer [...] When they asked me my plans, I said, "Well, there's no chance to go on."

After the fire, Zachary Taylor Kivett came to visit and found Campbell "in bed discouraged to the limit." Kivett said, "Why are you in bed? You're a Campbell. Get a hump on you." Kivett also made a pledge to J.A. Campbell to construct a new stronger, sturdier brick building on the campus. Over the next 478 days, he oversaw and supervised nearly every aspect of the academy's reconstruction, from drawing plans and making brick to sawing the lumber and mixing sand and lime. Within the first few days alone, he had developed the plans to renovate the tabernacle so it could be temporarily used for classroom space; he had arranged for wagons to deliver lumber; and he had brought in carpenters to get to work.

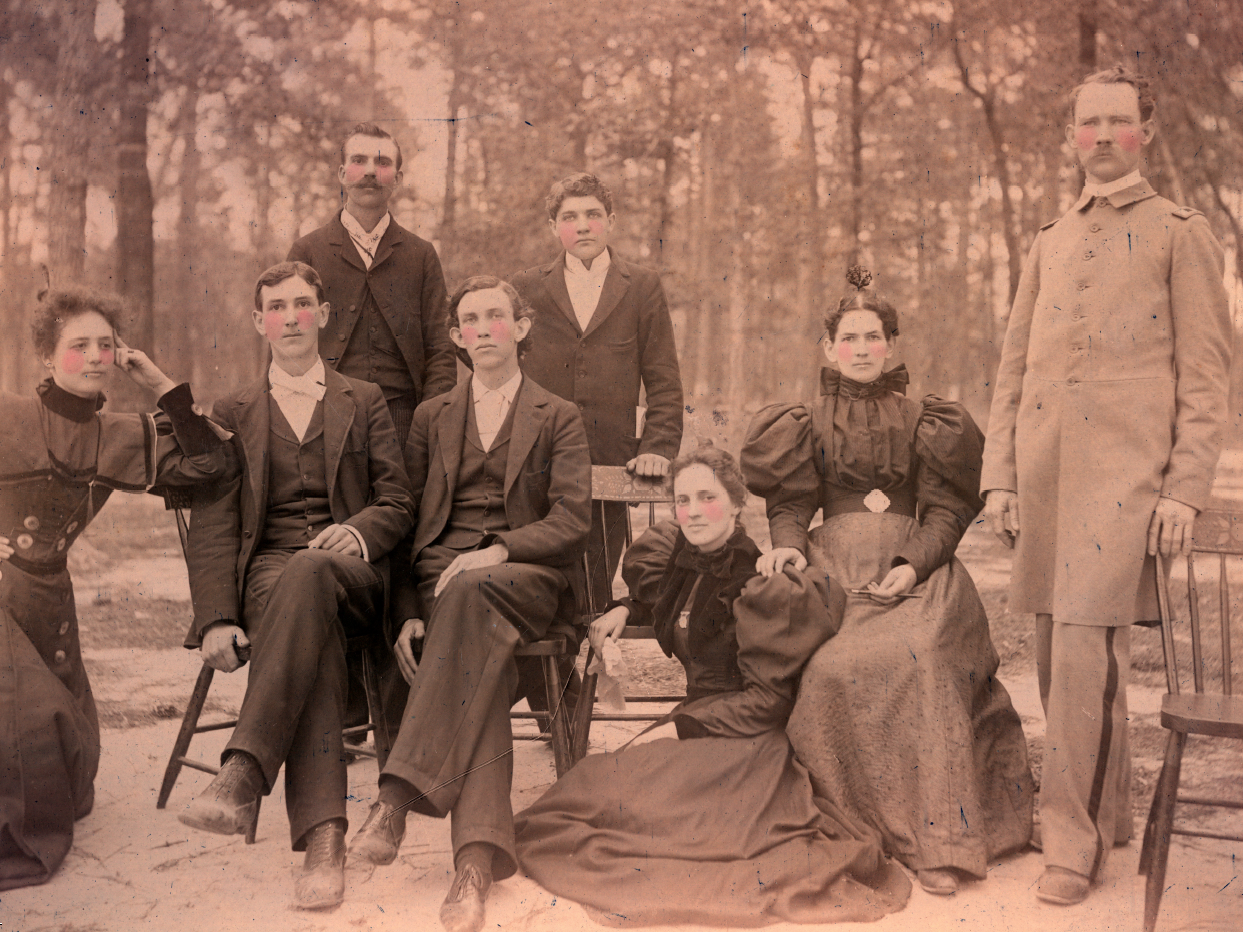
J.A. Campbell (far right) and his faculty at Buies Creek Academy in the late 1800s

By January 8, 1901, the tabernacle was open to classes. "A steam engine in britches" and "a grand old man," Kivett had been called.

In November 1903, the new brick building had been erected at a cost of $30,000. The completion of the Kivett Building brought new life to the school. The 1909 catalog noted, "It is built of beautiful brick, made on our own grounds, and is an everlasting monument to the love, loyalty, and sacrifices of our friends ... [who] are in itself a constant inspiration to live something high and noble, and to undertake the impossible." The catalog added that Buies Creek Academy and Business College was "a leading preparatory school with military features, business, shorthand, typewriting, telegraphy, art, music and normal departments.

World War I and the "Great Influenza Outbreak" of 1918 had a significant impact on the academy and the Buies Creek community. According to Bruce Blackmon, the influenza outbreak also inflicted a serious toll on some families—"If you saw a house and there was no smoke coming out of its chimney, that was an indication that the person responsible for heating the home was no longer alive."

Electric lights came to the campus in 1918. J.A. Campbell secured a $60,000 donation from Mr. B.N. Duke in 1927 to establish modern water and sewage facilities on the campus.

There were 620 students enrolled in the school in 1923, and the first dormitory for boys was completed that year. It later became known as Layton Dormitory.

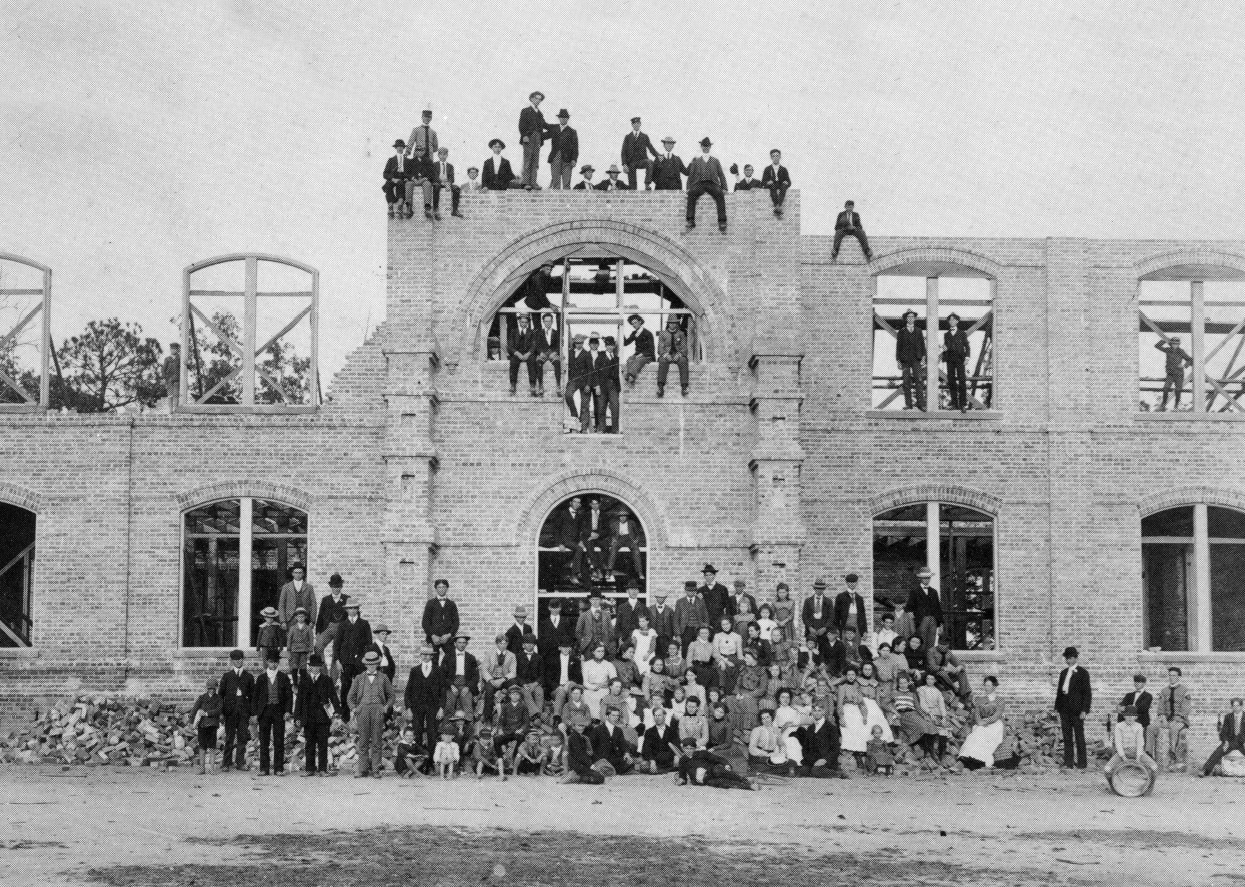
Construction of Kivett Hall in 1902 (completed in 1903). Kivett is the oldest remaining building on Campbell University's campus today.

According to J. Winston Pearce, "The evening of September 26, 1923, was a significant date for the life of the school." That evening D. Rich – treasurer of the R.J. Reynolds Tobacco Company – spent the night in the Campbell home and that morning they asked how he had slept. He replied, "I slept very little," He continued, "No, I did not sleep well. Jesus and I talked together most of the night, and Jesus told me 'Buies Creek must live.'" Rich died the following year and left one eighth of his estate to the academy. He also provided $60,000 for the construction of Carrie Rich Memorial Library in honor of his first wife, as well as the first brick gymnasium and the D. Rich Memorial Building, completed in 1926. These new facilities, as well as competition from the new high schools that were being completed across the state in the 1920s, provided incentives for the academy to become a junior college.

At the annual Baptist State Convention Meeting in Wilmington in 1925, J.A. Campbell sold his interest in the academy (appraised at $56,000) to the Baptist State Convention of North Carolina for $28,000; the school was then valued at more than $500,000. The Board of Education of the Baptist State Convention recommended unanimously that Buies Creek Academy become a junior college, beginning with the 1927–28 academic session.

At that meeting, the Reverend A. C. Hamby made the motion to change the name from Buies Creek Academy to Campbell College, in honor of its founder. Dean D. B. Bryan of Wake Forest College approved of the name change, and Wake Forest College bestowed on J.A. Campbell the honorary Doctor of Divinity degree in 1926.

J.A. Campbell died at the age of 72 in 1934. At Campbell's funeral, Charles E. Maddry of the Foreign Mission Board of the Southern Baptist Convention proclaimed, "Dr. Campbell was a great servant of God because he early had a divine experience of the saving power of Christ. Because of [Campbell's] great love for others, he literally wore himself out serving them, giving poor boys and girls the chance of an education. ... He always saw a future of service in his boys and girls."

=== Campbell Junior College (1926–1961) ===
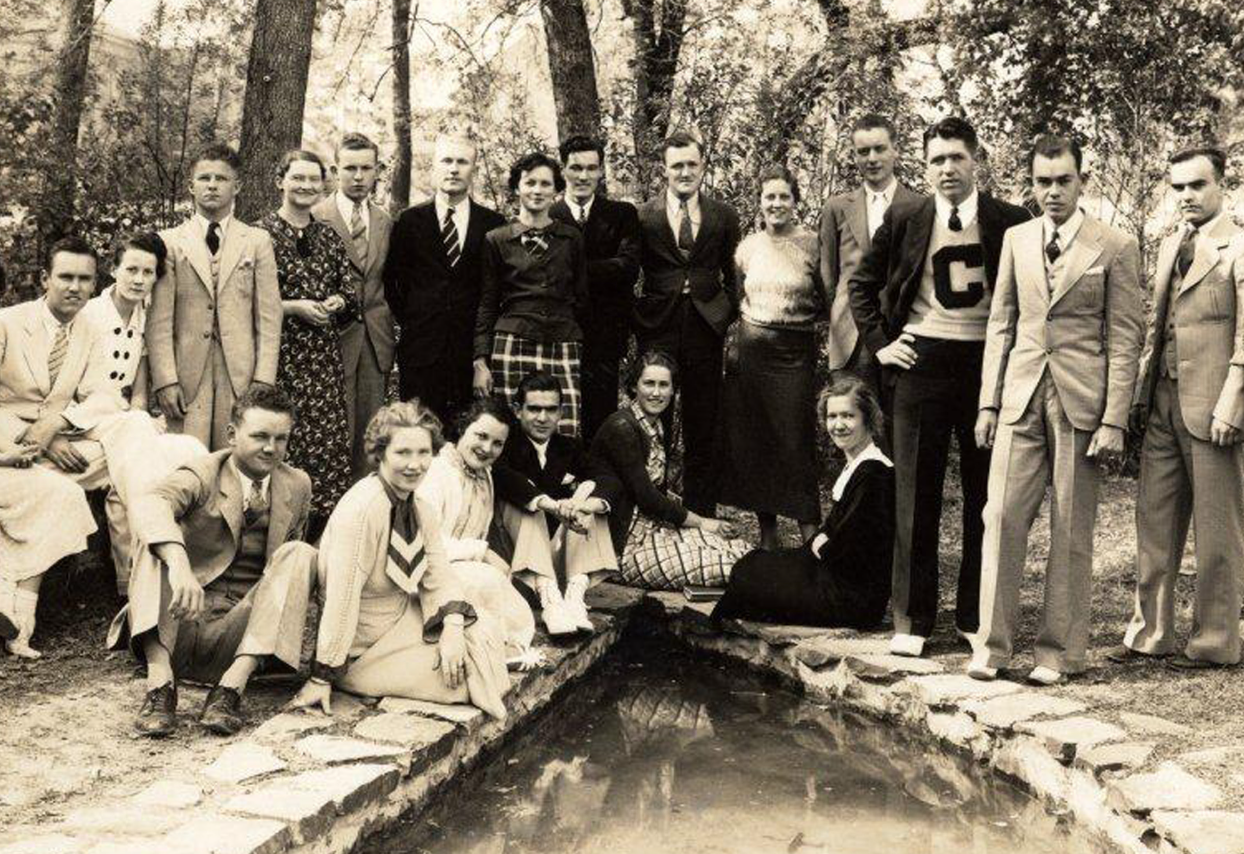
Campbell Junior College students gather at the Paul Green Outdoor Theater in the 1930s.

Leslie Hartwell "L.H." Campbell (1892–1970), the oldest son of the founder J.A. Campbell, was the unanimous choice by the board of trustees to succeed his father. Leslie was eight years old when the academy burned in December 1900. He remembered attending classes in the converted tabernacle when the Kivett Building was under construction. He graduated from Buies Creek Academy in 1908 and enrolled in Wake Forest College, along with his younger brother Carlyle.

Upon his father's death in 1934, L. H. Campbell at the age of forty-two became the youngest college president in North Carolina. He served as president for 33-years, through the Great Depression, World War II, and post-war expansion. In the post-war period, Campbell became a fully accredited co-educational Baptist-affiliated liberal arts and vocational college.

The only campus building constructed in the 1930s was the Dining Hall. It was built in 1933 to accommodate four-hundred students, and was later named for the college's longtime business manager, B.P. Marshbanks Sr.

Paul Green, a 1912 Buies Creek Academy alumnus and Pulitzer Prize-winning playwright, helped establish the Paul Green Theater, located between the D. Rich Administration Building and the Gym in 1934. in 1937, Campbell was the only junior college in North Carolina to offer courses in drama and journalism for college credit.

During World War II, the enrollment on campus declined from 700 students to around 400. Like many other colleges throughout the country, intercollegiate athletic programs such as football, baseball, basketball, track, and tennis were temporarily suspended during the war years. When many male students went off to fight, space for female boarding students was at a premium; and Layton Annex, which had housed males, was turned over to women. The war also affected food supplies on campus.

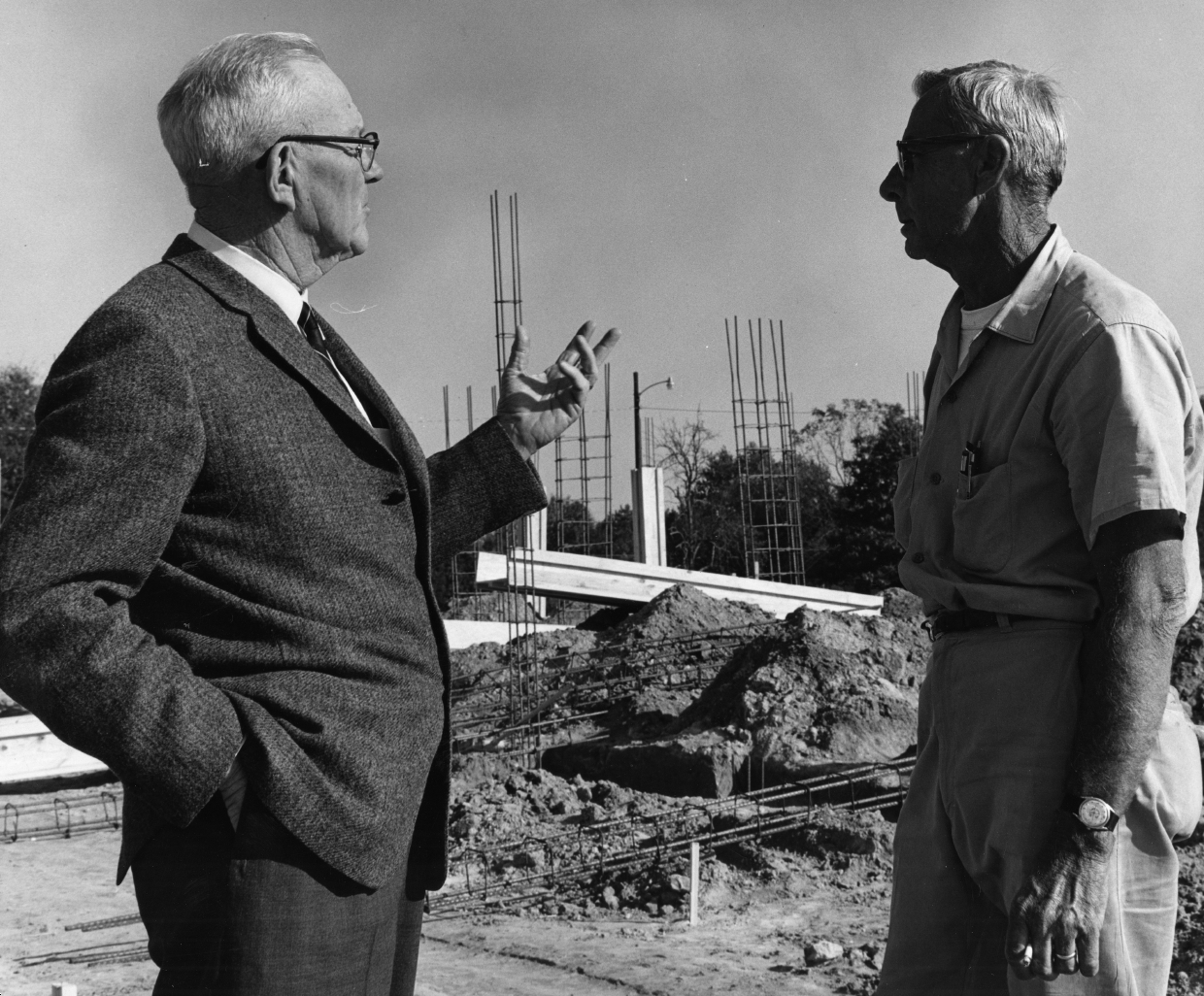
Campbell University's second president, Leslie Campbell, oversees construction on campus in the 1950s.

"I remember the day the war was formally declared. President Leslie Campbell got the entire student body into one of the large rooms at D. Rich, and had a radio in there. He turned it on, and we heard, live, President Roosevelt declare war." — Dorothea Stewart Gilbert ('46)

By 1957, the enrollment on the main campus reached 1,023 students, and more residential facilities were added to the campus.

=== Campbell College/University (1961–present) ===
Campbell became a senior college in 1961 and a university in 1979. In 1961, the James A. Campbell Administration Building was dedicated and Bryan Hall for women opened "as a cluster of 12 one-story apartment units grouped around an exterior wall" that could house 200 students. Strickland Hall opened in 1962 to accommodate 132 women, and E. P. Sauls Hall opened that same year to house 131 men. A major building completed on the campus was the 44,000-square-foot Leslie Campbell Hall of Science. This three-story structure originally housed the departments of physics, biology, and chemistry, as well as home economics.

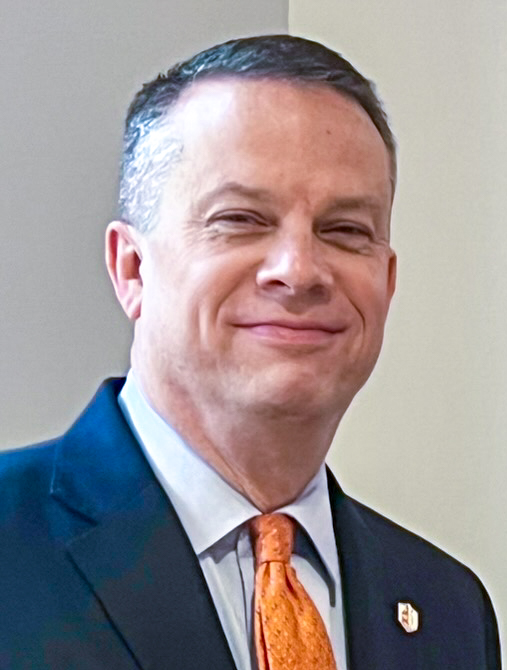
University President Dr. William M. Downs in 2025

In 2007, Campbell, along with four other private North Carolina Christian colleges, began a process to change their relationships with the Baptist State Convention of North Carolina, in order to obtain more academic freedom and select their own trustees. The state convention also agreed to start transferring funds traditionally given directly to the universities into a new scholarship fund for Baptist students.

In 2009, the schools gained autonomy from the Baptist State Convention of North Carolina and established a “good faith and cooperative” relationship with it. The four other schools were, Mars Hill University, Gardner-Webb University, Wingate University, and Chowan University.

== Campus ==
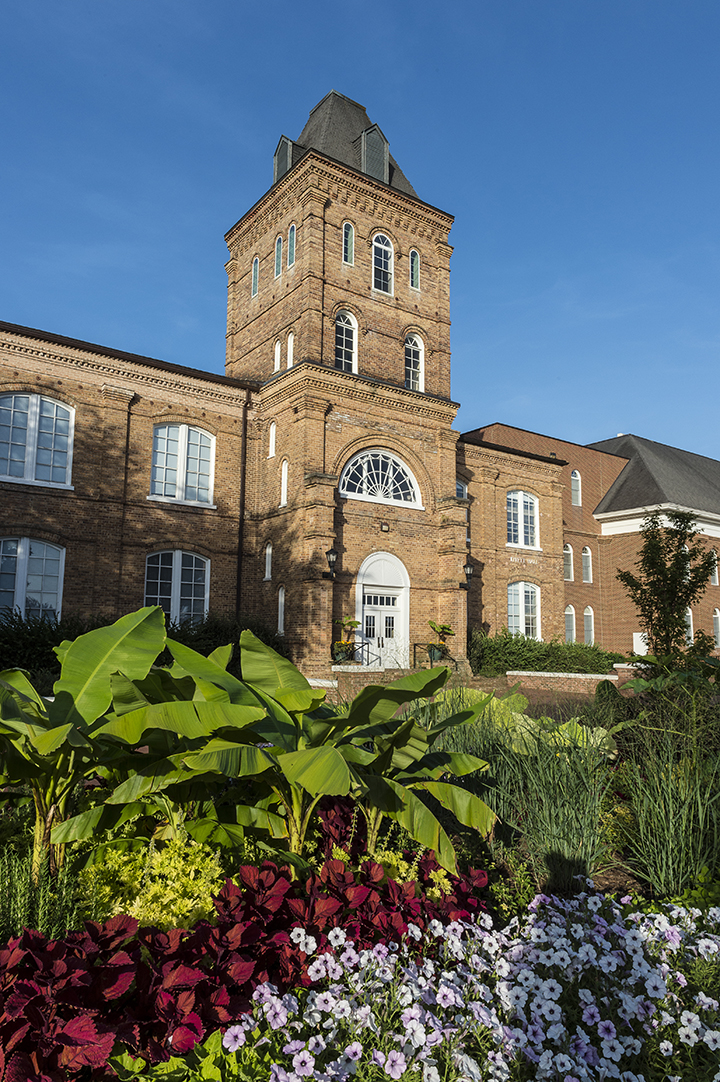
Kivett Hall, built in 1903, is the iconic centerpiece of Campbell University's main campus.

Located in the Sandhills of southeastern North Carolina, the university is nestled in the small unincorporated village of Buies Creek near the Cape Fear River. The Buies Creek census-designated place population was only 2,215 in the 2000 census and the surrounding area remains rural. However, Buies Creek is approximately 33 miles (53 km) south of Raleigh, the state capital, North Carolina's second-largest city, and approximately 33 miles (53 km) north of Fayetteville, North Carolina's sixth-largest city.

The center of campus is Academic Circle, which fronts Leslie Campbell Avenue to the south. Academic Circle is a grass thoroughfare, laced with sidewalks and magnolia trees that is surrounded on the south by the Oscar N. Harris Student Union (2020) and along the north by the Frederick L. Taylor Hall of Religion (1973) (Campbell University Divinity School), D. Rich Memorial Building (1923), Kivett Hall (1903), Wiggins Hall (1993) (formerly Law School), Butler Chapel (2009) and Britt Hall (1947) (campus bookstore).

North of Academic Circle the buildings flank the newly developed Fellowship Commons, a series of brick sidewalks and gathering places that connect the campus from the west on T.T. Lanier Street to the east on Main Street. In this part of campus are Marshbanks Dining Hall (1934), Leslie H. Campbell Hall of Science (1961), J.P. Riddle Pharmacy Center (1991), Maddox Hall (2007) (Pharmacy School), Pearson Hall (1915), Carrie Rich Memorial Library (1925), Carter Gymnasium (1952) and James A. Campbell Administration Building (1961).

Beyond Fellowship Commons lies the north campus which contains several residence halls along with the Taylor Bott Rogers Fine Arts Center (1984) and the Lundy-Fetterman School of Business (1999). East of Main Street are more of Campbell's athletic facilities including Jim Perry Stadium (baseball), Johnson Memorial Natatorium (swimming), and the John W. Pope, Jr. Convocation Center as well as the Buies Creek post office.

South of Leslie Campbell Avenue are more residence halls, including the new student apartments in Bob Barker Hall (2005), Luby Wood Hall, Burkot Hall, Small Hall, Sauls Hall, Murray Hall, Stadium Apartments, Faculty Apartments, and Pet Hall. South of U.S. Highway 421 are athletic fields and Barker–Lane Stadium. North campus residence halls include Jones Hall (1954) (for the university's honors college), Powell Hall, Pat Barker Hall, Strickland Hall, and Hedgepeth Hall. The newly constructed 96,000 sq. ft. Leon Levine Hall of Medical Science across Highway 421 hosts the new School of Osteopathic Medicine and the Physician Assistant Program.

== Academics ==
U.S. News & World Report for 2022 ranked Campbell tied for #277 in National Universities, tied for #58 in Best Undergraduate Teaching, and tied for #153 in Top Performers on Social Mobility, while finding Campbell's 2020 admissions were "selective" with an acceptance rate of 81%, with half the applicants admitted having an SAT score between 1010 and 1210 or an ACT score between 19 and 25.

Campbell offers over 100 tracks and concentrations; master's programs in business, education, pharmaceutical science, clinical research and divinity; and professional programs in law, pharmacy, physician assistant, physical therapy, nursing, and osteopathic medicine. In addition to Campbell's College of Arts & Sciences are the following:

Campbell University School of Pharmacy was established in 1986 and was later renamed the College of Pharmacy & Health Sciences.

The Catherine W. Wood School of Nursing provides professional nursing degrees.

The Campbell's Norman Adrian Wiggins School of Law is the university's law school.

Campbell's School of Engineering was launched in Fall 2015 and offers an ABET-accredited BS in engineering with concentrations in mechanical engineering, chemical/pharmaceutical engineering, electrical engineering, and electromechanical engineering.

The Campbell University Divinity school offers both undergraduate and graduate level degrees. The Divinity School officially opened on August 19, 1996.

The Campbell University School of Education, founded in 1985, offers undergraduate and graduate programs of study in Education, Psychology, Social Work, Mental Health Counseling, and School Counseling.

The Lundy-Fetterman School of Business offers a joint MBA with Pharm.D., J.D., and M.Div. students.

The university's newest school, the Campbell University School of Osteopathic Medicine, had its first class in August 2013.

Campbell University also has an adult and online education program with an online campus and campuses at Fort Bragg, North Carolina, Camp Lejeune, North Carolina, and Research Triangle Park in Raleigh, North Carolina. Campbell University's Online Education program was established as a pilot program in 1999. The program originated at the Camp Lejeune Campus and became a separate program in 2004, relocating to the Main Campus.

== Student activities ==
=== Athletics ===
Campbell University fields 20 NCAA Division I sports. As of the 2023–2024 academic year, the Camels are a member of the Coastal Athletic Association; they previously competed in the Big South Conference from 2011–2012 to 2022–2023. The men's wrestling team is an associate member of the Southern Conference.

Men's sports

- Baseball
- Basketball
- Cross country
- Football
- Golf
- Soccer
- Tennis
- Track
- Wrestling

Women's sports

- Basketball
- Cheerleading
- Cross country
- Golf
- Lacrosse
- Soccer
- Softball
- Swimming
- Tennis
- Track
- Volleyball

In 2008, Campbell completed the John W. Pope Jr. Convocation Center, an athletic complex for basketball, volleyball and wrestling. The facility houses a game basketball court, practice basketball court, practice wrestling room, varsity weight room, student fitness center, locker rooms, and the Department of Exercise Science. The wrestling team and the volleyball team both host matches on the main basketball court.

=== Student Government Association ===
The SGA serves as the voice of the student body of Campbell University. The organization consists of 45 members: nine from each class and a nine-member Executive Council. The SGA conducts the Annual Christmas Tree Lighting, passes resolutions to voice student concerns, and allows students a forum to share their voice with administration.

=== Pine Burr ===
The Pine Burr is Campbell University's yearbook, published every spring and given out for free to the students before final exams.

=== The Lyricist ===
The Lyricist is Campbell University's literary magazine, featuring poetry and prose from students and statewide contributors.

=== The Campbell Times ===
The Campbell Times is the student newspaper at the university, and is published bi-monthly in a tabloid format during the spring and fall semesters. The newspaper was established in 1925 and was originally known as Creek Pebbles until the current name was adopted in 1983. It had a print circulation of 2,000 as of 2007.

=== WCCE-FM ===
WCCE-FM is an FM radio station broadcasting on frequency 90.1 that was signed on by the university on October 7, 1974. Campbell sold the station in 2007.

=== Campbell University bands ===
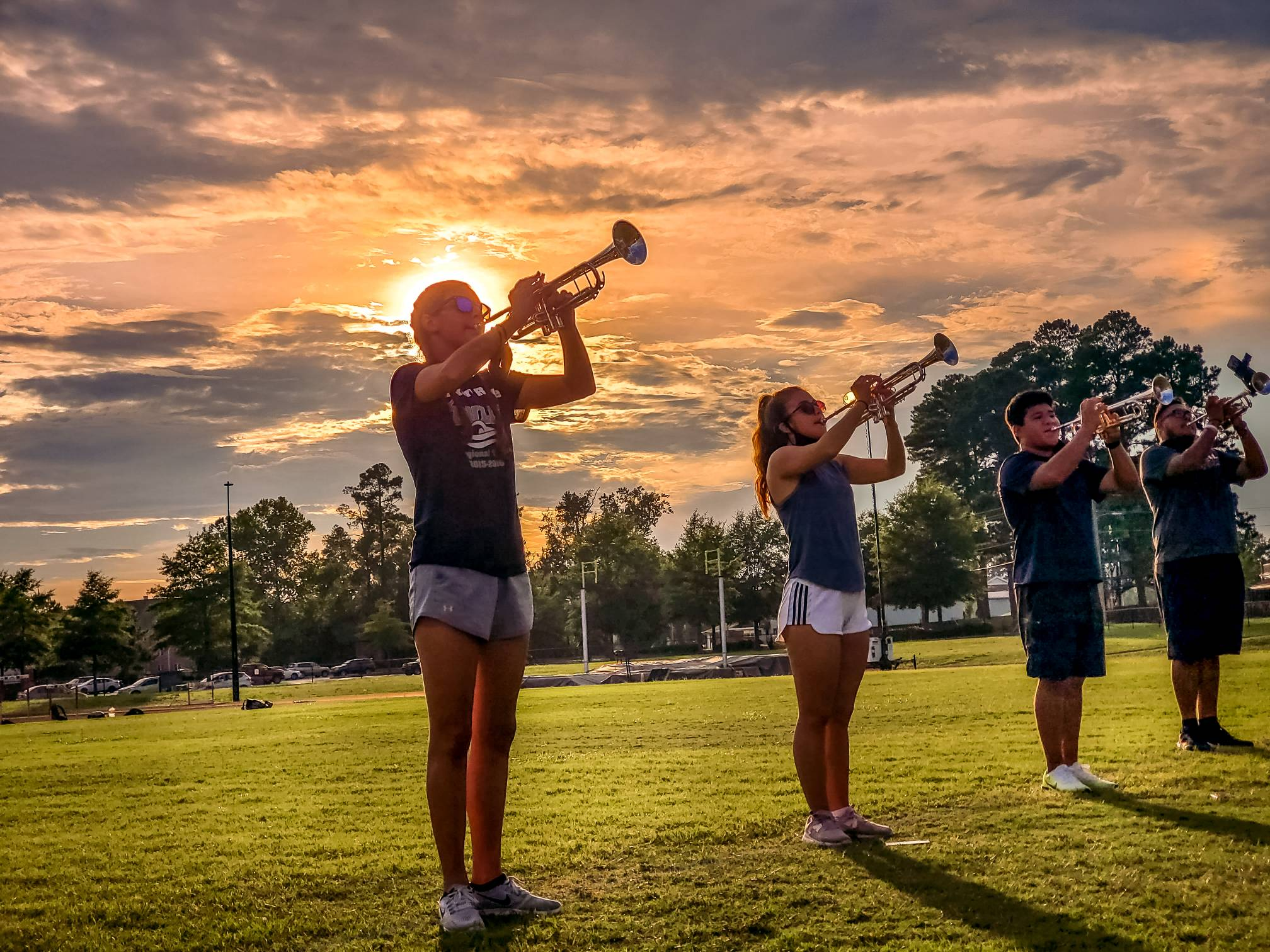
Sound of the Sandhills Marching Band during pre-season training

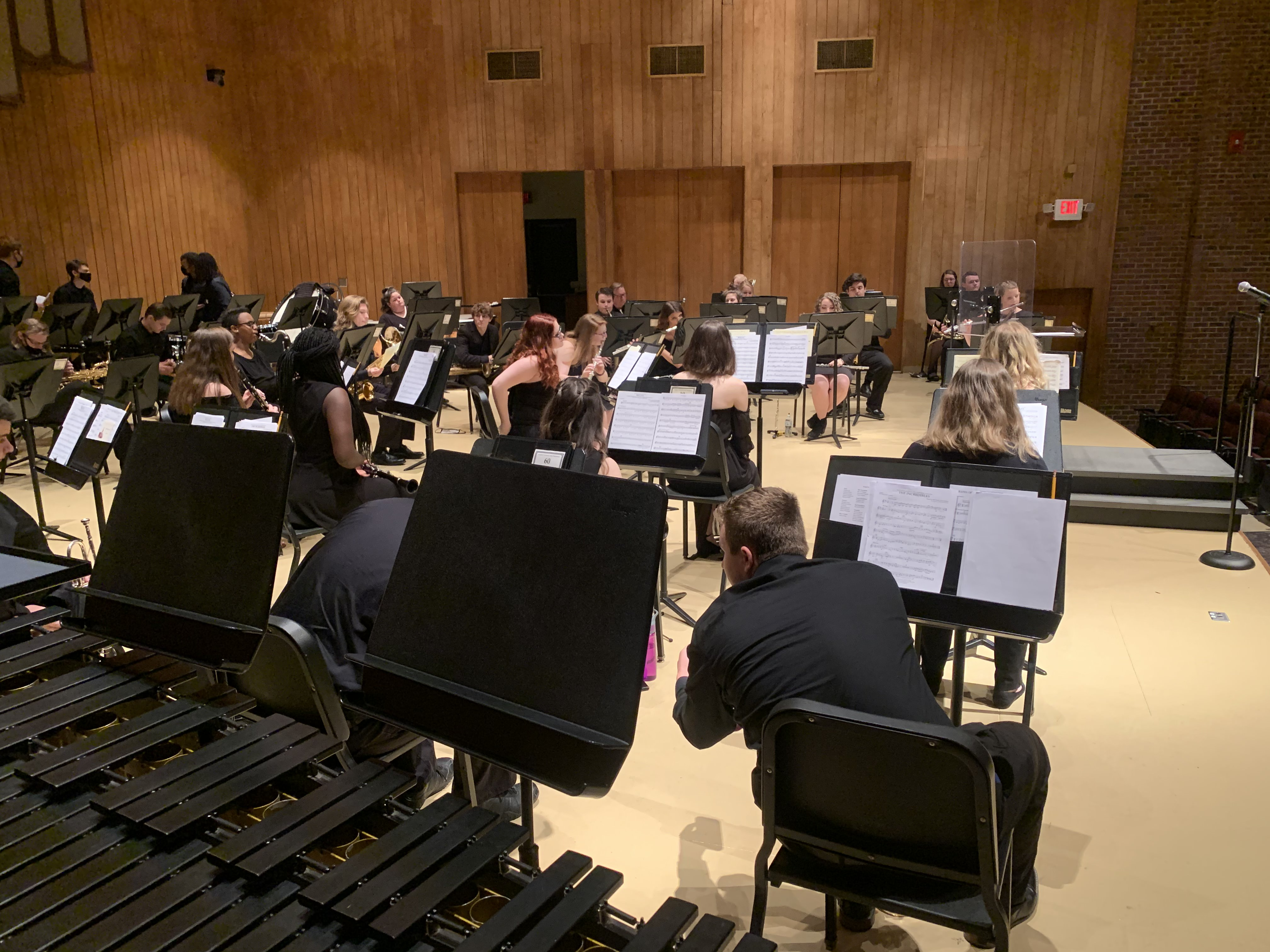
Campbell University Wind Ensemble prior to concert

Campbell University Bands features multiple concert and athletic musical ensembles, including the Sound of the Sandhills Marching Band, their featured athletic ensemble. Campbell University Bands regularly involves more than 100 members from across the campus. The featured ensemble of the concert bands is the Sandhills Wind Symphony, which performs concerts regularly during the academic year. Past directors of the program include noted composer Jack Stamp, who has been featured recently within performances of the program. Athletic bands performs regularly at university athletic events and annually accompany the men's and women's basketball teams to the Big South conference basketball tournament.

== Notable alumni ==
Name	Class year	Notability	References
Juan G. Ayala		Retired two-star general in the U.S. Marine Corps	
Jeffrey L. Bannister	1984	Major general in the United States Army	
Ann Marie Calabria	1983 (School of Law)	Judge, North Carolina Court of Appeals	
Chris Clemons	2019	Basketball player for the Houston Rockets of the NBA	
Ryan Fournier	2019	American political commentator	
Jesper Svensson	2019	Professional golfer on the PGA Tour and European Tour	
Kristin Cooper	1982 (School of Law)	First Lady of the state of North Carolina	
Margaret Currin	1979 (School of Law)	First woman United States Attorney in North Carolina	
S. Thomas Currin II	2010 (School of Law)	North Carolina Superior Court Judge	
Bob Etheridge	1965	Former member of the U.S. House of Representatives, North Carolina, 2nd District	
Paul Green	1914	recipient of the Pulitzer Prize for Drama	
Eric Griffin		Professional basketball player	
Michelle Koh		Professional golfer and 2016 Olympian	
Cal Koonce	1961	Former Major League Baseball pitcher and also Campbell's all-time winningest baseball coach	
George Lehmann		Professional basketball player	
John D. Loudermilk	1957	Singer and songwriter	
Elaine Marshall	1981 (School of Law)	North Carolina Secretary of State	
Cedric Mullins		Major League Baseball player	
Zach Neto		Major League Baseball player	
Gaylord Perry	1959	Hall of Fame Major League Baseball pitcher and two-time Cy Young Award winner	
Jim Perry	1959	Former Major League Baseball pitcher and Cy Young Award winner	
Ryan Thompson		Professional baseball player	
John Tyson	1979 (School of Law)	Judge, North Carolina Court of Appeals	
Drew Van Horn	1983	President of Young Harris College; former President of Brevard College	
Norman Adrian Wiggins	1948	former president and chancellor of the university	

== Notable faculty ==
- Jenna Carpenter
- Margaret Currin
- Clyde Edgerton
- David Funderburk
- Thom Goolsby
- Paul Newby
- Mab Segrest
