= Buies Creek, North Carolina =

- Census-designated place
- Panoramic view of Campbell University during the Summer 2020 season.

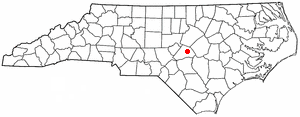
- Location of Buies Creek, North Carolina
- Coordinates: 35°24′29″N 78°44′29″W
- Country: United States
- State: North Carolina
- County: Harnett
- Township: Neills Creek

Area
  - Total: 3.08 sq mi (7.99 km^{2})
  - Land: 3.03 sq mi (7.84 km^{2})
  - Water: 0.058 sq mi (0.15 km^{2})
- Elevation: 184 ft (56 m)

Population (2020)
  - Total: 3,253
  - Density: 1,075.3/sq mi (415.19/km^{2})
- Time zone: UTC-5 (Eastern (EST))
  - Summer (DST): UTC-4 (EDT)
- ZIP code: 27506
- Area codes: 910, 472
- FIPS code: 37-08760
- GNIS feature ID: 2402731

Buies Creek (/ˈbuːiːz/ BOO-eez) is a census-designated place (CDP) located in the Neills Creek Township of Harnett County, North Carolina, United States. It is the home of Campbell University. The population was 3,253 at the 2020 census, up from 2,942 in 2010. Buies Creek is a part of the Dunn Micropolitan Area, which is also a part of the greater Raleigh–Durham–Cary Combined Statistical Area (CSA) as defined by the United States Census Bureau.

== History ==
The James Archibald Campbell House was listed on the National Register of Historic Places in 1977.

=== Incorporation ===
The wooded hamlet of Buies Creek was incorporated by the North Carolina General Assembly in 1914. The town charter was repealed in 1967.

== Geography ==
The community is in eastern Harnett County, 7 miles (11 km) northwest of Erwin and 5 miles (8 km) east of Lillington, the county seat. U.S. Route 421 passes through the community, connecting the two nearby towns. According to the United States Census Bureau, the CDP has a total area of 2.30 square miles (5.95 km^{2}), of which 0.004 square miles (0.01 km^{2}), or 0.25%, is water.

Buies Creek, a tributary of the Cape Fear River, drains the town of Buies Creek.

== Demographics ==
Historical population
| Census | Pop. | Note | %± |
|---|---|---|---|
| 2000 | 2,215 | | — |
| 2010 | 2,942 | | 32.8% |
| 2020 | 3,253 | | 10.6% |
U.S. Decennial Census

=== 2020 census ===
As of the 2020 census, Buies Creek had a population of 3,253. The median age was 21.9 years. 8.0% of residents were under the age of 18 and 7.7% of residents were 65 years of age or older. For every 100 females there were 82.2 males, and for every 100 females age 18 and over there were 80.1 males age 18 and over.

88.8% of residents lived in urban areas, while 11.2% lived in rural areas.

There were 917 households in Buies Creek, of which 18.9% had children under the age of 18 living in them. Of all households, 27.4% were married-couple households, 29.8% were households with a male householder and no spouse or partner present, and 36.0% were households with a female householder and no spouse or partner present. About 37.6% of all households were made up of individuals and 6.4% had someone living alone who was 65 years of age or older.

There were 1,170 housing units, of which 21.6% were vacant. The homeowner vacancy rate was 5.2% and the rental vacancy rate was 17.3%.

Buies Creek racial composition
| Race | Number | Percentage |
|---|---|---|
| White (non-Hispanic) | 2,448 | 75.25% |
| Black or African American (non-Hispanic) | 465 | 14.29% |
| Native American | 8 | 0.25% |
| Asian | 77 | 2.37% |
| Pacific Islander | 2 | 0.06% |
| Other/Mixed | 99 | 3.04% |
| Hispanic or Latino | 154 | 4.73% |

=== 2010 census ===
At the 2010 census there were 2,942 people, 577 households, and 232 families living in the CDP. The population density was 1,296.0 people per square mile (500.4 people/km^{2}). There were 699 housing units at an average density of 307.9 per square mile (118.9/km^{2}). The racial makeup of the CDP was 78.3% White, 14.8% African American, 0.7% Native American, 2.2% Asian, 0.0% Pacific Islander, 1.9% from other races, and 2.2% from two or more races. Hispanic or Latino of any race were 3.6%.

Of the 577 households 15.1% had children under the age of 18 living with them, 29.6% were married couples living together, 7.8% had a female householder with no husband present, and 59.8% were non-families. 36.6% of households were one person and 9.7% were one person aged 65 or older. The average household size was 2.07 and the average family size was 2.73.

The age distribution was 4.3% under the age of 14, 32.4% from 15 to 19, 42.0% from 20 to 24, 9.0% from 25 to 44, 7.9% from 45 to 64, and 4.5% 65 or older. The median age was 21 years. For every 100 females, there were 80.7 males. For every 100 females age 18 and over, there were 80.1 males.

=== Income and poverty ===
As of the 2014 American Community Survey (ACS), the median household income was $31,959, and the median family income was $51,106. Males had a median income of $9,625 versus $11,908 for females. The per capita income for the CDP was $8,301. As of the 2010 ACS, about 12.0% of families and 38.0% of the population were below the poverty line, including 28.8% of those under age 18 and 0.0% of those age 65 or over.

=== Community ===
It is also the home of many farms and primarily known because it is home to Campbell University.

== Colleges and universities ==
- Campbell University

== Notable people ==
- James Archibald Campbell, founded Campbell University (originally Buies Creek Academy) in 1887
- Paul Green, Pulitzer Prize-winning playwright
- Robert Burren Morgan, United States senator
- Woody Upchurch, former MLB pitcher
- Norman Adrian Wiggins, academic, university president
- Rhett James McLaughlin and Charles Lincoln "Link" Neal III, internet personalities and hosts of the daily show Good Mythical Morning
