= Virginia Cavaliers men's basketball statistical leaders =

The Virginia Cavaliers men's basketball statistical leaders are individual statistical leaders of the Virginia Cavaliers men's basketball program in various categories, including points, three-pointers, assists, blocks, rebounds, and steals. Within those areas, the lists identify single-game, single-season, and career leaders. The Cavaliers represent the University of Virginia in the NCAA's Atlantic Coast Conference.

Virginia began competing in intercollegiate basketball in 1905. However, the school's record book does not generally list records from before the 1950s, as records from before this period are often incomplete and inconsistent. Since scoring was much lower in this era, and teams played much fewer games during a typical season, it is likely that few or no players from this era would appear on these lists anyway.

The NCAA did not officially record assists as a stat until the 1983–84 season, and blocks and steals until the 1985–86 season, but Virginia's record books includes players in these stats before these seasons. These lists are updated through the end of the 2021–22 season.

== Scoring ==
Career
Rk	Player	Points	Seasons
1	Bryant Stith	2,516	1988–89 1989–90 1990–91 1991–92
2	Jeff Lamp	2,317	1977–78 1978–79 1979–80 1980–81
3	Buzzy Wilkinson	2,233	1952–53 1953–54 1954–55
4	Ralph Sampson	2,228	1979–80 1980–81 1981–82 1982–83
5	Sean Singletary	2,079	2004–05 2005–06 2006–07 2007–08
6	Junior Burrough	1,970	1991–92 1992–93 1993–94 1994–95
7	Wally Walker	1,849	1972–73 1973–74 1974–75 1975–76
8	Chris Williams	1,812	1998–99 1999–00 2000–01 2001–02
9	Malcolm Brogdon	1,809	2011–12 2013–14 2014–15 2015–16
10	Harold Deane	1,763	1993–94 1994–95 1995–96 1996–97

Season
Rk	Player	Points	Season
1	Buzzy Wilkinson	898	1954–55
2	Buzzy Wilkinson	814	1953–54
3	Bryant Stith	684	1991–92
4	Malcolm Brogdon	675	2015–16
5	Richard Morgan	673	1988–89
6	Bryant Stith	666	1989–90
7	Wally Walker	664	1975–76
8	Bryant Stith	653	1990–91
	Sean Singletary	653	2007–08
10	Jeff Lamp	641	1978–79

Single game
Rk	Player	Points	Season	Opponent
1	Barry Parkhill	51	1971–72	Baldwin-Wallace
2	Buzzy Wilkinson	48	1954–55	Hampden-Sydney
3	Buzzy Wilkinson	45	1953–54	North Carolina
	Buzzy Wilkinson	45	1953–54	Georgetown
	Buzzy Wilkinson	45	1953–54	Roanoke
	Buzzy Wilkinson	45	1954–55	Clemson
7	Buzzy Wilkinson	43	1954–55	Washington & Lee
	Buzzy Wilkinson	43	1954–55	VMI
9	Buzzy Wilkinson	42	1953–54	Hampden-Sydney
	Buzzy Wilkinson	42	1953–54	Duke
	Bob McCarty	42	1955–56	Clemson
	Jim Connelly	42	1965–66	William & Mary

== Rebounds ==
Career
Rk	Player	Rebounds	Seasons
1	Ralph Sampson	1,511	1979–80 1980–81 1981–82 1982–83
2	Travis Watson	1,115	1999–00 2000–01 2001–02 2002–03
3	Mike Scott	944	2007–08 2008–09 2009–10 2010–11 2011–12
4	Junior Burrough	929	1991–92 1992–93 1993–94 1994–95
5	Bryant Stith	859	1988–89 1989–90 1990–91 1991–92
6	Steve Castellan	799	1975–76 1976–77 1977–78 1978–79
7	Akil Mitchell	798	2010–11 2011–12 2012–13 2013–14
8	Ted Jeffries	787	1989–90 1990–91 1991–92 1992–93
9	Chris Williams	786	1998–99 1999–00 2000–01 2001–02
10	Norman Nolan	765	1994–95 1995–96 1996–97 1997–98

Season
Rk	Player	Rebounds	Season
1	Ralph Sampson	386	1982–83
2	Ralph Sampson	381	1979–80
3	Ralph Sampson	378	1980–81
4	Ralph Sampson	366	1981–82
5	Bob Mortell	350	1959–60
6	Travis Watson	321	2002–03
7	Akil Mitchell	312	2012–13
8	Norm Carmichael	300	1967–68
9	Junior Burrough	295	1994–95
10	Bill Gerry	277	1969–70

Single game
Rk	Player	Rebounds	Season	Opponent
1	Bob Mortell	25	1959–60	Washington & Lee
2	Bob Mortell	24	1959–60	VMI
3	Gene Engel	23	1960–61	VMI
4	Bob Mortell	22	1959–60	South Carolina
	Norm Carmichael	22	1967–68	Richmond
	John Gidding	22	1968–69	George Washington
	Ralph Sampson	22	1979–80	Old Dominion
8	Ralph Sampson	21	1979–80	Virginia Tech
	Ralph Sampson	21	1981–82	Virginia Tech
	Ralph Sampson	21	1981–82	UAB
	Ralph Sampson	21	1982–83	N.C. State

== Assists ==
Career
Rk	Player	Assists	Seasons
1	Kihei Clark	718	2018-19 2019-20 2020-21 2021-22 2022-23
2	John Crotty	683	1987–88 1988–89 1989–90 1990–91
3	Reece Beekman	636	2020-21 2021-22 2022-23 2023-24
4	Jeff Jones	598	1978–79 1979–80 1980–81 1981–82
5	Sean Singletary	587	2004–05 2005–06 2006–07 2007–08
6	London Perrantes	569	2013–14 2014–15 2015–16 2016–17
7	Donald Hand	529	1997–98 1998–99 1999–00 2000–01
8	Othell Wilson	493	1980–81 1981–82 1982–83 1983–84
9	Harold Deane	468	1993–94 1994–95 1995–96 1996–97
10	John Johnson	426	1984–85 1985–86 1986–87 1987–88

Season
Rk	Player	Assists	Season
1	John Crotty	214	1989–90
2	Reece Beekman	212	2023-24
3	John Crotty	208	1988–89
4	Ty Jerome	202	2018–19
	Sean Singletary	202	2007–08
6	Jeff Jones	200	1979–80
7	John Johnson	194	1986–87
8	Reece Beekman	181	2021-22
9	Kihei Clark	179	2022–23
10	Kihei Clark	176	2019–20

Single game
Rk	Player	Assists	Season	Opponent
1	John Crotty	14	1988–89	Middle Tennessee
	John Crotty	14	1990–91	N.C. State
	Cory Alexander	14	1994–95	N.Carolina A&T
	Harold Deane	14	1994–95	Maryland
	Ty Jerome	14	2018–19	Syracuse
6	Barry Parkhill	13	1970–71	Wake Forest
	Othell Wilson	13	1983–84	Wake Forest
	Kihei Clark	13	2019–20	Navy

== Steals ==
Career
Rk	Player	Steals	Seasons
1	Reece Beekman	228	2020-21 2021-22 2022-23 2023-24
2	Othell Wilson	222	1980–81 1981–82 1982–83 1983–84
3	Sean Singletary	200	2004–05 2005–06 2006–07 2007–08
4	Jeff Jones	189	1978–79 1979–80 1980–81 1981–82
	Chris Williams	189	1998–99 1999–00 2000–01 2001–02
6	Harold Deane	179	1993–94 1994–95 1995–96 1996–97
	Donald Hand	179	1997–98 1998–99 1999–00 2000–01
8	Bryant Stith	177	1988–89 1989–90 1990–91 1991–92
9	Richard Morgan	160	1985–86 1986–87 1987–88 1988–89
10	Adam Hall	157	1998–99 1999–00 2000–01 2001–02

Season
Rk	Player	Steals	Season
1	Reece Beekman	73	2021-22
2	Othell Wilson	69	1983–84
3	Reece Beekman	68	2023-24
4	Othell Wilson	61	1981–82
5	Sean Singletary	60	2007–08
6	Ty Jerome	57	2018–19
	Donald Hand	57	1998–99
	Reece Beekman	57	2022–23
	Chance Mallory	57	2025–26
10	Jeff Jones	56	1980–81

Single game
Rk	Player	Steals	Season	Opponent
1	Scott McCandlish	7	1971–72	Xavier
	Othell Wilson	7	1983–84	Virginia Tech
	Othell Wilson	7	1983–84	Wake Forest
	Richard Morgan	7	1988–89	Mississippi State
	Curtis Staples	7	1995–96	Tennessee-Martin
	Sean Singletary	7	2007–08	N.C. State
	Ryan Dunn	7	2023-24	Florida

== Blocks ==
Career
Rk	Player	Blocks	Seasons
1	Ralph Sampson	462	1979–80 1980–81 1981–82 1982–83
2	Jay Huff	166	2017–18 2018–19 2019–20 2020–21
3	Mamadi Diakite	156	2016–17 2017–18 2018–19 2019–20
4	Chris Alexander	148	1991–92 1992–93 1993–94 1994–95 1995–96
5	Isaiah Wilkins	141	2014–15 2015–16 2016–17 2017–18
6	Travis Watson	130	1999–00 2000–01 2001–02 2002–03
7	Kris Hunter	126	1996–97 1997–98 1998–99
8	Kadin Shedrick	114	2020-21 2021-22 2022-23
9	Jason Clark	112	2001–02 2002–03 2003–04 2004–05
10	Ryan Dunn	110	2022-23 2023-24

Season
Rk	Player	Blocks	Season
1	Ralph Sampson	157	1979–80
2	Ugonna Onyenso	105	2025-26
3	Ralph Sampson	103	1980–81
	Ralph Sampson	103	1982–83
5	Ralph Sampson	99	1981–82
6	Kris Hunter	88	1998–99
7	Johann Grunloh	80	2025-26
8	Ryan Dunn	77	2023-24
9	Kadin Shedrick	67	2021-22
10	Jay Huff	66	2020–21

Single game
Rk	Player	Blocks	Season	Opponent
1	Ralph Sampson	12	1979–80	Army
2	Ralph Sampson	10	1979–80	Old Dominion
	Jay Huff	10	2019–20	Duke
4	Ralph Sampson	9	1979–80	Temple
	Ralph Sampson	9	1979–80	Lafayette
	Ralph Sampson	9	1980–81	Maryland
	Ugonna Onyenso	9	2025–26	Duke
8	Ralph Sampson	8	1979–80	Virginia Tech
	Ralph Sampson	8	1981–82	Fairfield
	Ralph Sampson	8	1981–82	Chaminade
	Chris Alexander	8	1995–96	Richmond
	Jason Clark	8	2001–02	VMI
	Ugonna Onyenso	8	2025–26	Butler
	Johann Grunloh	8	2025–26	NC State
	Ugonna Onyenso	8	2025–26	NC State
