= List of All-Atlantic Coast Conference men's basketball teams =

The All-Atlantic Coast Conference (ACC) men's basketball team is an annual Atlantic Coast Conference honor bestowed on the best players in the conference following every college basketball season. The selections started in the ACC inaugural season in 1953–54. At the end of the season, ten players were nominated in two teams (first and second team) as the best of the season. Since the 1989–90 season, three teams were nominated, for a total of 15 players. On some occasions (for example, 1997, 2000 and 2006), six players were selected for one of the teams, bringing the number of total selections to 16.

Players are listed by number of votes, with the player who received the most votes listed first.

== Selections ==
=== 1953–1959 ===
Season	First team		Second team	
Season	Players	Teams	Players	Teams
1953–54	Dickie Hemric	Wake Forest	Vic Molodet	NC State
1953–54	Gene Shue	Maryland	Lefty Davis	Wake Forest
1953–54	Mel Thompson	NC State	Joe Belmont	Duke
1953–54	Rudy D'Emilio	Duke	Jerry Vayda	North Carolina
1953–54	Buzzy Wilkinson	Virginia	Ronnie Mayer	Duke
1954–55	Dickie Hemric	Wake Forest	Bob Kessler	Maryland
1954–55	Ronnie Shavlik	NC State	Bill Yarborough	Clemson
1954–55	Buzzy Wilkinson	Virginia	Joe Belmont	Duke
1954–55	Lennie Rosenbluth	North Carolina	Vic Molodet	NC State
1954–55	Ronnie Mayer	Duke	Lefty Davis	Wake Forest
1955–56	Ronnie Shavlik	NC State	Ronnie Mayer	Duke
1955–56	Lennie Rosenbluth	North Carolina	Grady Wallace	South Carolina
1955–56	Vic Molodet	NC State	Bob Kessler	Maryland
1955–56	Lefty Davis	Wake Forest	Bill Yarborough	Clemson
1955–56	Joe Belmont	Duke	Jack Murdock	Wake Forest
1956–57	Lennie Rosenbluth	North Carolina	Bob O'Brien	Maryland
1956–57	Grady Wallace	South Carolina	Pete Brennan	North Carolina
1956–57	Jack Murdock	Wake Forest	Jim Newcome	Duke
1956–57	Tommy Kearns	North Carolina	John Richter	NC State
1956–57	Jack Williams	Wake Forest	Ernie Wiggins	Wake Forest
1957–58	Pete Brennan	North Carolina	John Richter	NC State
1957–58	Lou Pucillo	NC State	Paul Schmidt	Duke
1957–58	Tommy Kearns	North Carolina	John Nacincik	Maryland
1957–58	Jim Newcome	Duke	Nick Davis	Maryland
1957–58	Herbert Busch	Virginia	Bucky Allen	Duke
1958–59	Lou Pucillo	NC State	Lee Shaffer	North Carolina
1958–59	York Larese	North Carolina	George Stepanovich	NC State
1958–59	John Richter	NC State	Howard Hurt	Duke
1958–59	Doug Moe	North Carolina	Paul Adkins	Virginia
1958–59	Carroll Youngkin	Duke	Charles McNeil	Maryland

=== 1960–1969 ===
Season	First team		Second team	
Season	Players	Teams	Players	Teams
1959–60	Len Chappell	Wake Forest	Art Whisnant	South Carolina
1959–60	Al Bunge	Maryland	Dave Budd	Wake Forest
1959–60	Lee Shaffer	North Carolina	Paul Adkins	Virginia
1959–60	York Larese	North Carolina	Billy Packer	Wake Forest
1959–60	Choppy Patterson	Clemson	Bob DiStefano	NC State
1959–60			Howard Hurt	Duke
1960–61	Len Chappell	Wake Forest	Art Whisnant	South Carolina
1960–61	York Larese	North Carolina	Tony Laquintano	Virginia
1960–61	Doug Moe	North Carolina	Ken Rohloff	NC State
1960–61	Art Heyman	Duke	Choppy Patterson	Clemson
1960–61	Billy Packer	Wake Forest	Howard Hurt	Duke
1960–61			Bob McDonald	Maryland
1961–62	Len Chappell	Wake Forest	Larry Brown	North Carolina
1961–62	Art Heyman	Duke	Dave Wiedeman	Wake Forest
1961–62	Jeff Mullins	Duke	John Punger	NC State
1961–62	Art Whisnant	South Carolina	Tony Laquintano	Virginia
1961–62	Jon Speaks	NC State	Jim Hudock	North Carolina
1962–63	Art Heyman	Duke	Scotti Ward	South Carolina
1962–63	Billy Cunningham	North Carolina	Gene Engel	Virginia
1962–63	Jeff Mullins	Duke	Jim Brennan	Clemson
1962–63	Dave Wiedeman	Wake Forest	Jerry Greenspan	Maryland
1962–63	Larry Brown	North Carolina	Ken Rohloff	NC State
1963–64	Jeff Mullins	Duke	Jim Brennan	Clemson
1963–64	Billy Cunningham	North Carolina	Hack Tison	Duke
1963–64	Ronnie Collins	South Carolina	Jay Buckley	Duke
1963–64	Chip Conner	Virginia	Butch Hassell	Wake Forest
1963–64	Frank Christie	Wake Forest	Buzz Harrison	Duke
1964–65	Billy Cunningham	North Carolina	Jay McMillen	Maryland
1964–65	Larry Lakins	NC State	Bob Lewis	North Carolina
1964–65	Jack Marin	Duke	Randolph Mahaffey	Clemson
1964–65	Bob Leonard	Wake Forest	Steve Vacendak	Duke
1964–65	Bob Verga	Duke	Ronny Watts	Wake Forest
1965–66	Bob Lewis	North Carolina	Larry Miller	North Carolina
1965–66	Jack Marin	Duke	Pete Coker	NC State
1965–66	Bob Verga	Duke	Paul Long	Wake Forest
1965–66	Eddie Biedenbach	NC State	Steve Vacendak	Duke
1965–66	Bob Leonard	Wake Forest	Gary Ward	Maryland
1966–67	Bob Verga	Duke	Jim Connelly	Virginia
1966–67	Larry Miller	North Carolina	Mike Lewis	Duke
1966–67	Bob Lewis	North Carolina	Jim Sutherland	Clemson
1966–67	Paul Long	Wake Forest	Jack Thompson	South Carolina
1966–67	Randy Mahaffey	Clemson	Gary Gregor	South Carolina
1967–68	Larry Miller	North Carolina	Butch Zatezalo	Clemson
1967–68	Mike Lewis	Duke	Rusty Clark	North Carolina
1967–68	Charlie Scott	North Carolina	Gary Gregor	South Carolina
1967–68	Skip Harlicka	South Carolina	Frank Standard	South Carolina
1967–68	Eddie Biedenbach	NC State	Michael Katos	Virginia
1968–69	John Roche	South Carolina	Butch Zatezalo	Clemson
1968–69	Charlie Scott	North Carolina	Tom Owens	South Carolina
1968–69	Bill Bunting	North Carolina	Will Hetzel	Maryland
1968–69	Vann Williford	NC State	Dick Grubar	North Carolina
1968–69	Charlie Davis	Wake Forest	Randy Denton	Duke

=== 1970–1979 ===
Season	First team		Second team	
Season	Players	Teams	Players	Teams
1969–70	John Roche	South Carolina	Randy Denton	Duke
1969–70	Charlie Scott	North Carolina	Will Hetzel	Maryland
1969–70	Vann Williford	NC State	Butch Zatezalo	Clemson
1969–70	Charlie Davis	Wake Forest	Paul Coder	NC State
1969–70	Tom Owens	South Carolina	Ed Leftwich	NC State
1970–71	Charlie Davis	Wake Forest	Barry Parkhill	Virginia
1970–71	John Roche	South Carolina	George Karl	North Carolina
1970–71	Dennis Wuycik	North Carolina	Bill Gerry	Virginia
1970–71	Randy Denton	Duke	Ed Leftwich	NC State
1970–71	Tom Owens	South Carolina	Jim O'Brien	Maryland
1971–72	Barry Parkhill	Virginia	Bill Chamberlain	North Carolina
1971–72	Bob McAdoo	North Carolina	Gary Melchionni	Duke
1971–72	Tom McMillen	Maryland	Alan Shaw	Duke
1971–72	Dennis Wuycik	North Carolina	George Karl	North Carolina
1971–72	Tommy Burleson	NC State	Len Elmore	Maryland
1972–73	David Thompson	NC State	Bobby Jones	North Carolina
1972–73	Tom Burleson	NC State	Barry Parkhill	Virginia
1972–73	George Karl	North Carolina	Len Elmore	Maryland
1972–73	Tom McMillen	Maryland	Chris Redding	Duke
1972–73	Gary Melchionni	Duke	Tony Byers	Wake Forest
1973–74	David Thompson	NC State	Tom Burleson	NC State
1973–74	Monte Towe	NC State	Tom McMillen	Maryland
1973–74	John Lucas II	Maryland	Darrell Elston	North Carolina
1973–74	Bobby Jones	North Carolina	Gus Gerard	Virginia
1973–74	Len Elmore	Maryland	Tony Byers	Wake Forest
1974–75	David Thompson	NC State	Tree Rollins	Clemson
1974–75	Skip Brown	Wake Forest	Bob Fleischer	Duke
1974–75	Mitch Kupchak	North Carolina	Brad Davis	Maryland
1974–75	John Lucas II	Maryland	Maurice Howard	Maryland
1974–75	Skip Wise	Clemson	Owen Brown	Maryland
1975–76	Mitch Kupchak	North Carolina	Wally Walker	Virginia
1975–76	Kenny Carr	NC State	Skip Brown	Wake Forest
1975–76	Phil Ford	North Carolina	Walter Davis	North Carolina
1975–76	John Lucas II	Maryland	Tree Rollins	Clemson
1975–76	Tate Armstrong	Duke	Rod Griffin	Wake Forest
1976–77	Rod Griffin	Wake Forest	Tree Rollins	Clemson
1976–77	Phil Ford	North Carolina	Jim Spanarkel	Duke
1976–77	Skip Brown	Wake Forest	Brad Davis	Maryland
1976–77	Kenny Carr	NC State	Tom LaGarde	North Carolina
1976–77	Walter Davis	North Carolina	Stan Rome	Clemson
1977–78	Phil Ford	North Carolina	Gene Banks	Duke
1977–78	Rod Griffin	Wake Forest	Jeff Lamp	Virginia
1977–78	Mike Gminski	Duke	Frank Johnson	Wake Forest
1977–78	Jim Spanarkel	Duke	Hawkeye Whitney	NC State
1977–78	Mike O'Koren	North Carolina	Clyde Austin	NC State
1978–79	Mike Gminski	Duke	Mike O'Koren	North Carolina
1978–79	Jeff Lamp	Virginia	Gene Banks	Duke
1978–79	Jim Spanarkel	Duke	Frank Johnson	Wake Forest
1978–79	Hawkeye Whitney	NC State	Lee Raker	Virginia
1978–79	Al Wood	North Carolina	Larry Gibson	Maryland

=== 1980–1989 ===
Season	First team		Second team	
Season	Players	Teams	Players	Teams
1979–80	Hawkeye Whitney	NC State	Jeff Lamp	Virginia
1979–80	Albert King	Maryland	Gene Banks	Duke
1979–80	Mike Gminski	Duke	Buck Williams	Maryland
1979–80	Mike O'Koren	North Carolina	Greg Manning	Maryland
1979–80	Billy Williams	Clemson	Al Wood	North Carolina
1980–81	Ralph Sampson	Virginia	Buck Williams	Maryland
1980–81	Al Wood	North Carolina	Albert King	Maryland
1980–81	Jeff Lamp	Virginia	James Worthy	North Carolina
1980–81	Frank Johnson	Wake Forest	Larry Nance	Clemson
1980–81	Gene Banks	Duke	Sidney Lowe	NC State
1981–82	Ralph Sampson	Virginia	Brook Steppe	Georgia Tech
1981–82	James Worthy	North Carolina	Thurl Bailey	NC State
1981–82	Sam Perkins	North Carolina	Vincent Hamilton	Clemson
1981–82	Vince Taylor	Duke	Dereck Whittenburg	NC State
1981–82	Othell Wilson	Virginia	Jim Johnstone	Wake Forest
1982–83	Ralph Sampson	Virginia	Othell Wilson	Virginia
1982–83	Michael Jordan	North Carolina	Ben Coleman	Maryland
1982–83	Sam Perkins	North Carolina	Adrian Branch	Maryland
1982–83	Thurl Bailey	NC State	Mark Price	Georgia Tech
1982–83	Sidney Lowe	NC State	Johnny Dawkins	Duke
1983–84	Michael Jordan	North Carolina	Ben Coleman	Maryland
1983–84	Sam Perkins	North Carolina	Johnny Dawkins	Duke
1983–84	Lorenzo Charles	NC State	Anthony Teachey	Wake Forest
1983–84	Mark Alarie	Duke	Othell Wilson	Virginia
1983–84	Mark Price	Georgia Tech	Kenny Green	Wake Forest
1984–85	Len Bias	Maryland	Kenny Green	Wake Forest
1984–85	Lorenzo Charles	NC State	Mark Alarie	Duke
1984–85	Mark Price	Georgia Tech	John Salley	Georgia Tech
1984–85	Johnny Dawkins	Duke	Adrian Branch	Maryland
1984–85	Brad Daugherty	North Carolina	Kenny Smith	North Carolina
1985–86	Len Bias	Maryland	Olden Polynice	Virginia
1985–86	Brad Daugherty	North Carolina	Chris Washburn	NC State
1985–86	Johnny Dawkins	Duke	Kenny Smith	North Carolina
1985–86	Mark Price	Georgia Tech	Steve Hale	North Carolina
1985–86	Mark Alarie	Duke	John Salley	Georgia Tech
1986–87	Horace Grant	Clemson	J. R. Reid	North Carolina
1986–87	Kenny Smith	North Carolina	Danny Ferry	Duke
1986–87	Joe Wolf	North Carolina	Andrew Kennedy	Virginia
1986–87	Derrick Lewis	Maryland	Tommy Amaker	Duke
1986–87	Muggsy Bogues	Wake Forest	Duane Ferrell	Georgia Tech
1987–88	Danny Ferry	Duke	Duane Ferrell	Georgia Tech
1987–88	J. R. Reid	North Carolina	Jeff Lebo	North Carolina
1987–88	Tom Hammonds	Georgia Tech	Sam Ivy	Wake Forest
1987–88	Vinny Del Negro	NC State	Mel Kennedy	Virginia
1987–88	Charles Shackleford	NC State	Derrick Lewis	Maryland
1988–89	Danny Ferry	Duke	Chris Corchiani	NC State
1988–89	Tom Hammonds	Georgia Tech	Elden Campbell	Clemson
1988–89	Chucky Brown	NC State	Brian Oliver	Georgia Tech
1988–89	Rodney Monroe	NC State	Kevin Madden	North Carolina
1988–89	Richard Morgan	Virginia	Steve Bucknall	North Carolina

=== 1990–1999 ===
Season	First team		Second team		Third team	
Season	Players	Teams	Players	Teams	Players	Teams
1989–90	Dennis Scott	Georgia Tech	Rodney Monroe	NC State	Chris Corchiani	NC State
1989–90	Bryant Stith	Virginia	Christian Laettner	Duke	Rick Fox	North Carolina
1989–90	Kenny Anderson	Georgia Tech	Brian Oliver	Georgia Tech	John Crotty	Virginia
1989–90	Dale Davis	Clemson	Phil Henderson	Duke	Jerrod Mustaf	Maryland
1989–90	Elden Campbell	Clemson	Tony Massenburg	Maryland	Alaa Abdelnaby	Duke
1990–91	Kenny Anderson	Georgia Tech	Chris Corchiani	NC State	John Crotty	Virginia
1990–91	Christian Laettner	Duke	Dale Davis	Clemson	Pete Chilcutt	North Carolina
1990–91	Rodney Monroe	NC State	Rodney Rogers	Wake Forest	Bobby Hurley	Duke
1990–91	Bryant Stith	Virginia	Tom Gugliotta	NC State	Matt Roe	Maryland
1990–91	Rick Fox	North Carolina	Malcolm Mackey	Georgia Tech	Thomas Hill	Duke
1991–92	Christian Laettner	Duke	Hubert Davis	North Carolina	Malcolm Mackey	Georgia Tech
1991–92	Walt Williams	Maryland	Bobby Hurley	Duke	Jon Barry	Georgia Tech
1991–92	Tom Gugliotta	NC State	Grant Hill	Duke	Kevin Thompson	NC State
1991–92	Rodney Rogers	Wake Forest	Sam Cassell	Florida State	George Lynch	North Carolina
1991–92	Bryant Stith	Virginia	Doug Edwards	Florida State	Thomas Hill	Duke
1992–93	Rodney Rogers	Wake Forest	Sam Cassell	Florida State	Thomas Hill	Duke
1992–93	Bobby Hurley	Duke	Randolph Childress	Wake Forest	Sharone Wright	Clemson
1992–93	Eric Montross	North Carolina	Bob Sura	Florida State	Travis Best	Georgia Tech
1992–93	George Lynch	North Carolina	Doug Edwards	Florida State	Kevin Thompson	NC State
1992–93	Grant Hill	Duke	Cory Alexander	Virginia	Chris Whitney	Clemson
1993–94	Grant Hill	Duke	Travis Best	Georgia Tech	Trelonnie Owens	Wake Forest
1993–94	Randolph Childress	Wake Forest	Derrick Phelps	North Carolina	Junior Burrough	Virginia
1993–94	Bob Sura	Florida State	Sharone Wright	Clemson	Antonio Lang	Duke
1993–94	James Forrest	Georgia Tech	Eric Montross	North Carolina	Todd Fuller	NC State
1993–94	Joe Smith	Maryland	Cherokee Parks	Duke	Devin Gray	Clemson
1994–95	Joe Smith	Maryland	Travis Best	Georgia Tech	Junior Burrough	Virginia
1994–95	Jerry Stackhouse	North Carolina	Bob Sura	Florida State	James Forrest	Georgia Tech
1994–95	Randolph Childress	Wake Forest	Cherokee Parks	Duke	Johnny Rhodes	Maryland
1994–95	Tim Duncan	Wake Forest	Harold Deane	Virginia	Jeff McInnis	North Carolina
1994–95	Rasheed Wallace	North Carolina	Todd Fuller	NC State	James Collins	Florida State
1995–96	Tim Duncan	Wake Forest	Johnny Rhodes	Maryland	James Collins	Florida State
1995–96	Todd Fuller	NC State	Drew Barry	Georgia Tech	Keith Booth	Maryland
1995–96	Stephon Marbury	Georgia Tech	Chris Collins	Duke	Jeff Capel	Duke
1995–96	Matt Harpring	Georgia Tech	Harold Deane	Virginia	Dante Calabria	North Carolina
1995–96	Antawn Jamison	North Carolina	Jeff McInnis	North Carolina	Ricky Price	Duke
1996–97	Tim Duncan	Wake Forest	Greg Buckner	Clemson	Vince Carter	North Carolina
1996–97	Antawn Jamison	North Carolina	Terrell McIntyre	Clemson	Harold Deane	Virginia
1996–97	Keith Booth	Maryland	James Collins	Florida State	Laron Profit	Maryland
1996–97	Trajan Langdon	Duke	Steve Wojciechowski	Duke	Shammond Williams	North Carolina
1996–97	Matt Harpring	Georgia Tech	CC Harrison	NC State	Serge Zwikker	North Carolina
1996–97					Tony Rutland	Wake Forest
1997–98	Antawn Jamison	North Carolina	Norman Nolan	Virginia	Curtis Staples	Virginia
1997–98	Matt Harpring	Georgia Tech	Ed Cota	North Carolina	Steve Wojciechowski	Duke
1997–98	Vince Carter	North Carolina	Shammond Williams	North Carolina	Laron Profit	Maryland
1997–98	Trajan Langdon	Duke	CC Harrison	NC State	Terrell McIntyre	Clemson
1997–98	Roshown McLeod	Duke	Greg Buckner	Clemson	Rodney Elliott	Maryland
1998–99	Elton Brand	Duke	William Avery	Duke	Shane Battier	Duke
1998–99	Trajan Langdon	Duke	Terrell McIntyre	Clemson	Chris Carrawell	Duke
1998–99	Steve Francis	Maryland	Ed Cota	North Carolina	Ron Hale	Florida State
1998–99	Terence Morris	Maryland	Jason Collier	Georgia Tech	Laron Profit	Maryland
1998–99	Ademola Okulaja	North Carolina	Robert O'Kelley	Wake Forest	Chris Williams	Virginia

=== 2000–2009 ===
Season	First team		Second team		Third team	
Season	Players	Teams	Players	Teams	Players	Teams
1999–00	Chris Carrawell	Duke	Terence Morris	Maryland	Jay Williams	Duke
1999–00	Shane Battier	Duke	Ed Cota	North Carolina	Darius Songaila	Wake Forest
1999–00	Juan Dixon	Maryland	Donald Hand	Virginia	Brendan Haywood	North Carolina
1999–00	Will Solomon	Clemson	Jason Collier	Georgia Tech	Ron Hale	Florida State
1999–00	Lonny Baxter	Maryland	Joseph Forte	North Carolina	Damous Anderson	Florida State
1999–00			Chris Williams	Virginia		
2000–01	Shane Battier	Duke	Will Solomon	Clemson	Chris Williams	Virginia
2000–01	Joseph Forte	North Carolina	Brendan Haywood	North Carolina	Roger Mason Jr.	Virginia
2000–01	Jay Williams	Duke	Lonny Baxter	Maryland	Terence Morris	Maryland
2000–01	Juan Dixon	Maryland	Josh Howard	Wake Forest	Jason Capel	North Carolina
2000–01	Alvin Jones	Georgia Tech	Travis Watson	Virginia	Nate James	Duke
2001–02	Jay Williams	Duke	Lonny Baxter	Maryland	Josh Howard	Wake Forest
2001–02	Juan Dixon	Maryland	Darius Songaila	Wake Forest	Steve Blake	Maryland
2001–02	Mike Dunleavy Jr.	Duke	Roger Mason Jr.	Virginia	Edward Scott	Clemson
2001–02	Anthony Grundy	NC State	Tony Akins	Georgia Tech	Chris Wilcox	Maryland
2001–02	Carlos Boozer	Duke	Travis Watson	Virginia	Jason Capel	North Carolina
2002–03	Josh Howard	Wake Forest	Drew Nicholas	Maryland	JJ Redick	Duke
2002–03	Julius Hodge	NC State	Chris Bosh	Georgia Tech	Ryan Randle	Maryland
2002–03	Steve Blake	Maryland	Travis Watson	Virginia	Chris Duhon	Duke
2002–03	Dahntay Jones	Duke	Tim Pickett	Florida State	Raymond Felton	North Carolina
2002–03	Edward Scott	Clemson	Vytas Danelius	Wake Forest	B. J. Elder	Georgia Tech
2003–04	Rashad McCants	North Carolina	JJ Redick	Duke	Chris Paul	Wake Forest
2003–04	Julius Hodge	NC State	B. J. Elder	Georgia Tech	Raymond Felton	North Carolina
2003–04	Tim Pickett	Florida State	Marcus Melvin	NC State	Luol Deng	Duke
2003–04	Chris Duhon	Duke	Sean May	North Carolina	John Gilchrist	Maryland
2003–04	Justin Gray	Wake Forest	Shelden Williams	Duke	Jarrett Jack	Georgia Tech
2004–05	JJ Redick	Duke	Guillermo Diaz	Miami (FL)	Rashad McCants	North Carolina
2004–05	Chris Paul	Wake Forest	Julius Hodge	NC State	Sharrod Ford	Clemson
2004–05	Sean May	North Carolina	Eric Williams	Wake Forest	Nik Caner-Medley	Maryland
2004–05	Shelden Williams	Duke	Jarrett Jack	Georgia Tech	Daniel Ewing	Duke
2004–05	Raymond Felton	North Carolina	Justin Gray	Wake Forest	Jawad Williams	North Carolina
2005–06	JJ Redick	Duke	Al Thornton	Florida State	Eric Williams	Wake Forest
2005–06	Tyler Hansbrough	North Carolina	Guillermo Diaz	Miami (FL)	Cameron Bennerman	NC State
2005–06	Shelden Williams	Duke	Justin Gray	Wake Forest	Robert Hite	Miami
2005–06	Craig Smith	Boston College	Jared Dudley	Boston College	Nik Caner-Medley	Maryland
2005–06	Sean Singletary	Virginia	David Noel	North Carolina	J. R. Reynolds	Virginia
2005–06					Reyshawn Terry	North Carolina
2006–07	Jared Dudley	Boston College	J. R. Reynolds	Virginia	Kyle Visser	Wake Forest
2006–07	Tyler Hansbrough	North Carolina	D. J. Strawberry	Maryland	Javaris Crittenton	Georgia Tech
2006–07	Al Thornton	Florida State	Tyrese Rice	Boston College	Brandon Costner	NC State
2006–07	Sean Singletary	Virginia	Josh McRoberts	Duke	Jamon Gordon	Virginia Tech
2006–07	Zabian Dowdell	Virginia Tech	Brandan Wright	North Carolina	Jack McClinton	Miami
2007–08	Tyler Hansbrough	North Carolina	Greivis Vásquez	Maryland	Kyle Singler	Duke
2007–08	Tyrese Rice	Boston College	James Gist	Maryland	Cliff Hammonds	Clemson
2007–08	Sean Singletary	Virginia	Wayne Ellington	North Carolina	Toney Douglas	Florida State
2007–08	DeMarcus Nelson	Duke	A. D. Vassallo	Virginia Tech	James Johnson	Wake Forest
2007–08	Jack McClinton	Miami	K. C. Rivers	Clemson	Greg Paulus	Duke
2008–09	Tyler Hansbrough	North Carolina	Jeff Teague	Wake Forest	James Johnson	Wake Forest
2008–09	Toney Douglas	Florida State	Trevor Booker	Clemson	Malcolm Delaney	Virginia Tech
2008–09	Ty Lawson	North Carolina	Tyrese Rice	Boston College	A. D. Vassallo	Virginia Tech
2008–09	Gerald Henderson Jr.	Duke	Kyle Singler	Duke	Danny Green	North Carolina
2008–09	Jack McClinton	Miami	Greivis Vásquez	Maryland	Gani Lawal	Georgia Tech

=== 2010–2019 ===
Season	First team		Second team		Third team	
Season	Players	Teams	Players	Teams	Players	Teams
2009–10	Greivis Vásquez	Maryland	Al-Farouq Aminu	Wake Forest	Gani Lawal	Georgia Tech
2009–10	Jon Scheyer	Duke	Nolan Smith	Duke	Dorenzo Hudson	Virginia Tech
2009–10	Malcolm Delaney	Virginia Tech	Sylven Landesberg	Virginia	Chris Singleton	Florida State
2009–10	Trevor Booker	Clemson	Tracy Smith	NC State	Joe Trapani	Boston College
2009–10	Kyle Singler	Duke	Ish Smith	Wake Forest	Solomon Alabi	Florida State
2010–11	Nolan Smith	Duke	Tyler Zeller	North Carolina	Chris Singleton	Florida State
2010–11	Jordan Williams	Maryland	John Henson	North Carolina	Demontez Stitt	Clemson
2010–11	Malcolm Delaney	Virginia Tech	Harrison Barnes	North Carolina	Joe Trapani	Boston College
2010–11	Kyle Singler	Duke	Iman Shumpert	Georgia Tech	Malcolm Grant	Miami
2010–11	Reggie Jackson	Boston College	Jeff Allen	Virginia Tech	Kendall Marshall	North Carolina
2011–12	Tyler Zeller	North Carolina	Kendall Marshall	North Carolina	Seth Curry	Duke
2011–12	Mike Scott	Virginia	Terrell Stoglin	Maryland	C. J. Harris	Wake Forest
2011–12	John Henson	North Carolina	Michael Snaer	Florida State	Lorenzo Brown	NC State
2011–12	Austin Rivers	Duke	C. J. Leslie	NC State	Kenny Kadji	Miami
2011–12	Harrison Barnes	North Carolina	Erick Green	Virginia Tech	Mason Plumlee	Duke
2012–13	Mason Plumlee	Duke	Seth Curry	Duke	C. J. Leslie	NC State
2012–13	Erick Green	Virginia Tech	Kenny Kadji	Miami	Ryan Anderson	Boston College
2012–13	Shane Larkin	Miami	Lorenzo Brown	NC State	Quinn Cook	Duke
2012–13	Joe Harris	Virginia	Reggie Bullock	North Carolina	Devin Booker	Clemson
2012–13	Richard Howell	NC State	James Michael McAdoo	North Carolina	Akil Mitchell	Virginia
2013–14	Jabari Parker	Duke	Malcolm Brogdon	Virginia	Olivier Hanlan	Boston College
2013–14	T. J. Warren	NC State	Lamar Patterson	Pittsburgh	Joe Harris	Virginia
2013–14	Marcus Paige	North Carolina	Tyler Ennis	Syracuse	Rion Brown	Miami
2013–14	C. J. Fair	Syracuse	Rodney Hood	Duke	Dez Wells	Maryland
2013–14	K. J. McDaniels	Clemson	James Michael McAdoo	North Carolina	Daniel Miller	Georgia Tech
2014–15	Jahlil Okafor	Duke	Montrezl Harrell	Louisville	Marcus Paige	North Carolina
2014–15	Jerian Grant	Notre Dame	Quinn Cook	Duke	Tyus Jones	Duke
2014–15	Rakeem Christmas	Syracuse	Terry Rozier	Louisville	Pat Connaughton	Notre Dame
2014–15	Malcolm Brogdon	Virginia	Trevor Lacey	NC State	Anthony Gill	Virginia
2014–15	Olivier Hanlan	Boston College	Justin Anderson	Virginia	Brice Johnson	North Carolina
2015–16	Brice Johnson	North Carolina	Michael Gbinije	Syracuse	Marcus Georges-Hunt	Georgia Tech
2015–16	Malcolm Brogdon	Virginia	Sheldon McClellan	Miami	Anthony Gill	Virginia
2015–16	Cat Barber	NC State	Demetrius Jackson	Notre Dame	Zach Auguste	Notre Dame
2015–16	Grayson Allen	Duke	Brandon Ingram	Duke	Michael Young	Pittsburgh
2015–16	Jaron Blossomgame	Clemson	Damion Lee	Louisville	Ángel Rodríguez	Miami
2016–17	Luke Kennard	Duke	Dwayne Bacon	Florida State	Michael Young	Pittsburgh
2016–17	Justin Jackson	North Carolina	Dennis Smith Jr.	NC State	Jaron Blossomgame	Clemson
2016–17	John Collins	Wake Forest	Ben Lammers	Georgia Tech	Andrew White III	Syracuse
2016–17	Bonzie Colson	Notre Dame	Joel Berry II	North Carolina	Davon Reed	Miami
2016–17	Donovan Mitchell	Louisville	London Perrantes	Virginia	Jayson Tatum	Duke
2017–18	Marvin Bagley III	Duke	Tyus Battle	Syracuse	Grayson Allen	Duke
2017–18	Jerome Robinson	Boston College	Marcquise Reed	Clemson	Matt Farrell	Notre Dame
2017–18	Luke Maye	North Carolina	Devon Hall	Virginia	Ty Jerome	Virginia
2017–18	Joel Berry II	North Carolina	Wendell Carter Jr.	Duke	Josh Okogie	Georgia Tech
2017–18	Kyle Guy	Virginia	Justin Robinson	Virginia Tech	Ömer Yurtseven	NC State
2018–19	Zion Williamson	Duke	Luke Maye	North Carolina	Jordan Nwora	Louisville
2018–19	R. J. Barrett	Duke	Ky Bowman	Boston College	Marcquise Reed	Clemson
2018–19	De'Andre Hunter	Virginia	Ty Jerome	Virginia	Tyus Battle	Syracuse
2018–19	Cameron Johnson	North Carolina	Coby White	North Carolina	Nickeil Alexander-Walker	Virginia Tech
2018–19	Kyle Guy	Virginia	Kerry Blackshear Jr.	Virginia Tech	John Mooney	Notre Dame

=== 2020–present ===
Season	First team		Second team		Third team	
Season	Players	Teams	Players	Teams	Players	Teams
2019–20	Vernon Carey Jr.	Duke	Mamadi Diakite	Virginia	Kihei Clark	Virginia
2019–20	Jordan Nwora	Louisville	Devin Vassell	Florida State	Jose Alvarado	Georgia Tech
2019–20	John Mooney	Notre Dame	Garrison Brooks	North Carolina	Aamir Simms	Clemson
2019–20	Tre Jones	Duke	Trent Forrest	Florida State	Cole Anthony	North Carolina
2019–20	Elijah Hughes	Syracuse	Markell Johnson	NC State	Olivier Sarr	Wake Forest
2020–21	Moses Wright	Georgia Tech	Keve Aluma	Virginia Tech	RaiQuan Gray	Florida State
2020–21	Justin Champagnie	Pittsburgh	Jose Alvarado	Georgia Tech	Isaiah Wong	Miami
2020–21	Carlik Jones	Louisville	Jay Huff	Virginia	Quincy Guerrier	Syracuse
2020–21	Matthew Hurt	Duke	M. J. Walker	Florida State	Prentiss Hubb	Notre Dame
2020–21	Sam Hauser	Virginia	Aamir Simms	Clemson	Armando Bacot	North Carolina
2020–21					Scottie Barnes	Florida State
2021–22
2021–22	Armando Bacot	North Carolina	Keve Aluma	Virginia Tech	Dane Goodwin	Notre Dame
2021–22	Alondes Williams	Wake Forest	Dereon Seabron	NC State	Mark Williams	Duke
2021–22	Paolo Banchero	Duke	Wendell Moore Jr.	Duke	Isaiah Wong	Miami
2021–22	Kameron McGusty	Miami	Blake Wesley	Notre Dame	Jayden Gardner	Virginia
2021–22	Buddy Boeheim	Syracuse	Jake LaRavia	Wake Forest	Michael Devoe	Georgia Tech
2022–23
2022–23	Isaiah Wong	Miami	Kyle Filipowski	Duke	Norchad Omier	Miami
2022–23	Armando Bacot	North Carolina	Terquavion Smith	NC State	PJ Hall	Clemson
2022–23	Tyree Appleby	Wake Forest	Jarkel Joiner	NC State	Kihei Clark	Virginia
2022–23	Hunter Tyson	Clemson	Jordan Miller	Miami	Jesse Edwards	Syracuse
2022–23	Jamarius Burton	Pittsburgh	Blake Hinson	Pittsburgh	Reece Beekman	Virginia
2023–24
2023–24	R. J. Davis	North Carolina	Armando Bacot	North Carolina	DJ Horne	NC State
2023–24	PJ Hall	Clemson	Reece Beekman	Virginia	Harrison Ingram	North Carolina
2023–24	Kyle Filipowski	Duke	Judah Mintz	Syracuse	Jeremy Roach	Duke
2023–24	Hunter Sallis	Wake Forest	Norchad Omier	Miami	Markus Burton	Notre Dame
2023–24	Blake Hinson	Pittsburgh	Quinten Post	Boston College	Sean Pedulla	Virginia Tech
2024–25
2024–25	Cooper Flagg	Duke	RJ Davis	North Carolina	Terrence Edwards Jr.	Louisville
2024–25	Maxime Raynaud	Stanford	Markus Burton	Notre Dame	Tyrese Proctor	Duke
2024–25	Chucky Hepburn	Louisville	Ian Schieffelin	Clemson	Baye Ndongo	Georgia Tech
2024–25	Chase Hunter	Clemson	Kon Knueppel	Duke	Boopie Miller	SMU
2024–25	Hunter Sallis	Wake Forest	Jamir Watkins	Florida State	Jaland Lowe	Pitt
2025–26
2025–26	Cameron Boozer	Duke	Boopie Miller	SMU	Isaiah Evans	Duke
2025–26	Caleb Wilson	North Carolina	Juke Harris	Wake Forest	Mikel Brown Jr.	Louisville
2025–26	Ebuka Okorie	Stanford	Henri Veesaar	North Carolina	Quadir Copeland	NC State
2025–26	Malik Reneau	Miami	Tre Donaldson	Miami	Robert McCray V	Florida State
2025–26	Thijs De Ridder	Virginia	Ryan Conwell	Louisville	Dai Dai Ames	California
