= List of Atlantic Coast Conference men's basketball regular season champions =

This is a list of Atlantic Coast Conference men's basketball regular season champions. While the ACC Regular Season Champion is officially recognized and there is a trophy which states "Regular Season Champion," it is not the official league champion as the ACC Champion is the winner of the ACC Tournament with a trophy that says "Atlantic Coast Conference Champion." The conference's automatic NCAA berth is reserved for the ACC Tournament winner.

== By school ==
School	Number	Years
North Carolina	33	1956, 1957, 1959, 1960, 1961, 1967, 1968, 1969, 1971, 1972, 1976, 1977, 1978, 1979, 1982, 1983, 1984, 1985, 1987, 1988, 1993, 1995, 2001, 2005, 2007, 2008, 2009, 2011, 2012, 2016, 2017, 2019, 2024
Duke	22	1954, 1958, 1963, 1964, 1965, 1966, 1979, 1986, 1991, 1992, 1994, 1997, 1998, 1999, 2000, 2001, 2004, 2006, 2010, 2022, 2025, 2026
Virginia	11	1981, 1982, 1983, 1995, 2007, 2014, 2015, 2018, 2019, 2021, 2023
North Carolina State	7	1955, 1956, 1959, 1973, 1974, 1985, 1989
Maryland	5	1975, 1980, 1995, 2002, 2010
Wake Forest	4	1960, 1962, 1995, 2003
Georgia Tech	2	1985, 1996
Miami	2	2013, 2023
Florida State	1	2020
Clemson	1	1990
South Carolina	1	1970
Boston College	0	
Louisville	0	
Notre Dame	0	
Pittsburgh	0	
Syracuse	0	
Virginia Tech	0	

== By year ==
1954	Duke
1955	NC State
1956	North Carolina, NC State
1957	North Carolina
1958	Duke
1959	North Carolina, NC State
1960	North Carolina, Wake Forest
1961	North Carolina
1962	Wake Forest
1963	Duke
1964	Duke
1965	Duke
1966	Duke
1967	North Carolina
1968	North Carolina
1969	North Carolina
1970	South Carolina
1971	North Carolina
1972	North Carolina
1973	NC State
1974	NC State
1975	Maryland
1976	North Carolina
1977	North Carolina
1978	North Carolina
1979	Duke, North Carolina
1980	Maryland
1981	Virginia
1982	North Carolina, Virginia
1983	North Carolina, Virginia
1984	North Carolina
1985	Georgia Tech, North Carolina, NC State
1986	Duke
1987	North Carolina
1988	North Carolina
1989	NC State
1990	Clemson
1991	Duke
1992	Duke
1993	North Carolina
1994	Duke
1995	Maryland, North Carolina, Virginia, Wake Forest
1996	Georgia Tech
1997	Duke
1998	Duke
1999	Duke
2000	Duke
2001	Duke, North Carolina
2002	Maryland
2003	Wake Forest
2004	Duke
2005	North Carolina
2006	Duke
2007	North Carolina, Virginia
2008	North Carolina
2009	North Carolina
2010	Duke, Maryland
2011	North Carolina
2012	North Carolina
2013	Miami
2014	Virginia
2015	Virginia
2016	North Carolina
2017	North Carolina
2018	Virginia
2019	Virginia, North Carolina
2020	Florida State
2021	Virginia
2022	Duke
2023	Miami, Virginia
2024	North Carolina
2025	Duke
2026	Duke

== See also ==
- Atlantic Coast Conference men's basketball
- ACC men's basketball tournament
- List of Atlantic Coast Conference men's basketball tournament champions
