= 2024–25 Brooklyn Nets season =

- Head coach: Jordi Fernández
- General manager: Sean Marks
- Owner: Joseph Tsai
- Arena: Barclays Center

Results
- Record: 26–56 (.317)
- Place: Division: 4th (Atlantic); Conference: 12th (Eastern)
- Playoff finish: Did not qualify
- Stats at Basketball Reference

Local media
- Television: YES Network; WLNY-TV (5 games)
- Radio: WFAN-AM • WFAN-FM

The 2024–25 Brooklyn Nets season was the 49th season of the franchise in the National Basketball Association (NBA), 58th season overall, and its 13th season playing in the New York City borough of Brooklyn. On April 22, 2024, the Nets hired Jordi Fernández as their new head coach. The Nets were eliminated from postseason contention for the second season in a row on March 28, following a loss to the Los Angeles Clippers.

== Draft ==
The Nets did not hold any picks in the 2024 NBA draft. However, the Nets would make two major trades become announced the day before the draft began. Their first trade (which was made official on the first day of the draft) involved a deal with the Houston Rockets where the Rockets gave back the Nets' 2026 first round pick and relinquished their 2025 first round pick swap rights in exchange for two first round picks originally owned by the Phoenix Suns and two 2029 first round picks, one of them being the rights to a first round pick swap that year. Their second and more major trade made that day (which became official on July 6) involved the crosstown rivals, the New York Knicks, where they traded away star small forward Mikal Bridges, Keita Bates-Diop, the draft rights to Juan Pablo Vaulet, and a 2026 second round pick of theirs to the Knicks in exchange for Bojan Bogdanović, Shake Milton via sign-and-trade, Mamadi Diakite, two 2025 first round picks (one of them being protected by the Milwaukee Bucks), the Nets regaining their own 2025 second round pick back, first round picks from the Knicks in 2027, 2029, and 2031, and a 2028 first round pick swap with the Knicks.

== Roster ==
Brooklyn Nets roster
Players

| Pos. | No. | Player | Height | Weight | DOB | From |
|---|---|---|---|---|---|---|
| G | 4 | Reece Beekman (TW) | 6 ft 3 in (1.91 m) | 190 lb (86 kg) | 2001-10-08 | Virginia |
| C | 33 | Nic Claxton | 6 ft 11 in (2.11 m) | 215 lb (98 kg) | 1999-04-17 | Georgia |
| F | 21 | Noah Clowney (injured) | 6 ft 9 in (2.06 m) | 210 lb (95 kg) | 2004-07-14 | Alabama |
| G | 10 | Tyson Etienne (TW) | 6 ft 2 in (1.88 m) | 200 lb (91 kg) | 1999-09-17 | Wichita State |
| F | 12 | Tosan Evbuomwan (TW) | 6 ft 7 in (2.01 m) | 217 lb (98 kg) | 2001-02-16 | Princeton |
| F | 2 | Cameron Johnson | 6 ft 8 in (2.03 m) | 210 lb (95 kg) | 1996-03-03 | North Carolina |
| G | 45 | Keon Johnson | 6 ft 5 in (1.96 m) | 185 lb (84 kg) | 2002-03-10 | Tennessee |
| F | 27 | Maxwell Lewis | 6 ft 7 in (2.01 m) | 215 lb (98 kg) | 2002-07-27 | Pepperdine |
| G | 13 | Tyrese Martin | 6 ft 6 in (1.98 m) | 215 lb (98 kg) | 1999-03-07 | Connecticut |
| G | 14 | De'Anthony Melton (injured) | 6 ft 3 in (1.91 m) | 200 lb (91 kg) | 1998-05-28 | USC |
| G | 1 | D'Angelo Russell | 6 ft 3 in (1.91 m) | 193 lb (88 kg) | 1996-02-23 | Ohio State |
| C | 20 | Day'Ron Sharpe | 6 ft 10 in (2.08 m) | 265 lb (120 kg) | 2001-11-06 | North Carolina |
| G | 24 | Cam Thomas (injured) | 6 ft 3 in (1.91 m) | 210 lb (95 kg) | 2001-10-13 | LSU |
| F | 26 | Drew Timme | 6 ft 10 in (2.08 m) | 235 lb (107 kg) | 2000-09-09 | Gonzaga |
| F | 9 | Trendon Watford | 6 ft 8 in (2.03 m) | 237 lb (108 kg) | 2000-11-09 | LSU |
| F | 0 | Dariq Whitehead | 6 ft 6 in (1.98 m) | 220 lb (100 kg) | 2004-08-01 | Duke |
| F | 8 | Ziaire Williams | 6 ft 9 in (2.06 m) | 185 lb (84 kg) | 2001-09-12 | Stanford |
| F | 22 | Jalen Wilson | 6 ft 6 in (1.98 m) | 220 lb (100 kg) | 2000-11-04 | Kansas |

Coaches
Head coach
- Jordi Fernández
Assistant(s)
- Travis Bader
- Deividas Dulkys
- Ryan Forehan-Kelly
- Dutch Gaitley
- Connor Griffin
- Jay Hernandez
- Steve Hetzel
- Juwan Howard
- Corey Vinson

Legend
- (DP) Unsigned draft pick
- (FA) Free agent
- (S) Suspended
- (GL) On assignment to G League affiliate
- (TW) Two-way affiliate player
- Injured

Roster
Updated: March 28, 2025

== Standings ==
=== Division ===
| Atlantic Division | W | L | PCT | GB | Home | Road | Div | GP |
|---|---|---|---|---|---|---|---|---|
| y – Boston Celtics | 61 | 21 | .744 | – | 28‍–‍13 | 33‍–‍8 | 14‍–‍2 | 82 |
| x – New York Knicks | 51 | 31 | .622 | 10.0 | 27‍–‍14 | 24‍–‍17 | 12‍–‍4 | 82 |
| Toronto Raptors | 30 | 52 | .366 | 31.0 | 18‍–‍23 | 12‍–‍29 | 8‍–‍8 | 82 |
| Brooklyn Nets | 26 | 56 | .317 | 35.0 | 12‍–‍29 | 14‍–‍27 | 3‍–‍13 | 82 |
| Philadelphia 76ers | 24 | 58 | .293 | 37.0 | 12‍–‍29 | 12‍–‍29 | 3‍–‍13 | 82 |

=== Conference ===
Eastern Conference
| # | Team | W | L | PCT | GB | GP |
|---|---|---|---|---|---|---|
| 1 | c – Cleveland Cavaliers * | 64 | 18 | .780 | – | 82 |
| 2 | y – Boston Celtics * | 61 | 21 | .744 | 3.0 | 82 |
| 3 | x – New York Knicks | 51 | 31 | .622 | 13.0 | 82 |
| 4 | x – Indiana Pacers | 50 | 32 | .610 | 14.0 | 82 |
| 5 | x – Milwaukee Bucks | 48 | 34 | .585 | 16.0 | 82 |
| 6 | x – Detroit Pistons | 44 | 38 | .537 | 20.0 | 82 |
| 7 | y – Orlando Magic * | 41 | 41 | .500 | 23.0 | 82 |
| 8 | pi – Atlanta Hawks | 40 | 42 | .488 | 24.0 | 82 |
| 9 | pi – Chicago Bulls | 39 | 43 | .476 | 25.0 | 82 |
| 10 | x – Miami Heat | 37 | 45 | .451 | 27.0 | 82 |
| 11 | Toronto Raptors | 30 | 52 | .366 | 34.0 | 82 |
| 12 | Brooklyn Nets | 26 | 56 | .317 | 38.0 | 82 |
| 13 | Philadelphia 76ers | 24 | 58 | .293 | 40.0 | 82 |
| 14 | Charlotte Hornets | 19 | 63 | .232 | 45.0 | 82 |
| 15 | Washington Wizards | 18 | 64 | .220 | 46.0 | 82 |

== Game log ==
=== Preseason ===
2024 preseason game log
Total: 1–3 (Home: 1–1; Road: 0–2)
Preseason: 1–3 (home: 1–1; road: 0–2)

| Game | Date | Team | Score | High points | High rebounds | High assists | Location Attendance | Record |
|---|---|---|---|---|---|---|---|---|
| 1 | October 8 | @ L.A. Clippers | L 106–115 | Keon Johnson (14) | Keon Johnson (6) | Dennis Schröder (5) | Frontwave Arena; 6,190 | 0–1 |
| 2 | October 14 | Washington | W 131–92 | Cam Thomas (17) | Ziaire Williams (7) | Dennis Schröder (7) | Barclays Center; 12,904 | 1–1 |
| 3 | October 16 | @ Philadelphia | L 95–117 | Cam Thomas (17) | Ziaire Williams (9) | Cameron Johnson (6) | Wells Fargo Center; 19,914 | 1–2 |
| 4 | October 18 | Toronto | L 112–116 | Cameron Johnson (32) | Simmons, Williams (8) | Ben Simmons (6) | Barclays Center; 17,158 | 1–3 |

2024–25 preseason schedule

=== Regular season ===
2024–25 game log
Total: 26–56 (Home: 12–29; Road: 14–27)
October: 2–3 (home: 1–1; road: 1–2)

| Game | Date | Team | Score | High points | High rebounds | High assists | Location Attendance | Record |
|---|---|---|---|---|---|---|---|---|
| 1 | October 23 | @ Atlanta | L 116–120 | Cam Thomas (36) | Dorian Finney-Smith (8) | Ben Simmons (8) | State Farm Arena; 17,548 | 0–1 |
| 2 | October 25 | @ Orlando | L 101–116 | Cam Thomas (24) | Ziaire Williams (7) | Dennis Schröder (6) | Kia Center; 19,087 | 0–2 |
| 3 | October 27 | Milwaukee | W 115–102 | Cam Thomas (32) | Nic Claxton (11) | Schröder, Simmons (6) | Barclays Center; 17,926 | 1–2 |
| 4 | October 29 | Denver | L 139–144 (OT) | Dennis Schröder (28) | Nic Claxton (12) | Dennis Schröder (14) | Barclays Center; 17,926 | 1–3 |
| 5 | October 30 | @ Memphis | W 119–106 | Dennis Schröder (33) | K. Johnson, Wilson (7) | Dennis Schröder (8) | FedExForum; 14,745 | 2–3 |

November: 7–8 (home: 3–3; road: 4–5)

| Game | Date | Team | Score | High points | High rebounds | High assists | Location Attendance | Record |
|---|---|---|---|---|---|---|---|---|
| 6 | November 1 | Chicago | W 120–112 | Cam Thomas (32) | Nic Claxton (9) | Ben Simmons (11) | Barclays Center; 17,977 | 3–3 |
| 7 | November 3 | Detroit | L 92–106 | Cameron Johnson (26) | Ben Simmons (6) | Ben Simmons (6) | Barclays Center; 17,086 | 3–4 |
| 8 | November 4 | Memphis | W 106–104 | C. Johnson, Schröder (20) | Nic Claxton (8) | Schröder, Thomas (6) | Barclays Center; 18,088 | 4–4 |
| 9 | November 8 | @ Boston | L 104–108 (OT) | Cam Thomas (31) | Ziaire Williams (12) | Ben Simmons (8) | TD Garden; 19,156 | 4–5 |
| 10 | November 9 | @ Cleveland | L 100–105 | Cameron Johnson (23) | Nic Claxton (10) | Cam Thomas (6) | Rocket Mortgage FieldHouse; 19,432 | 4–6 |
| 11 | November 11 | @ New Orleans | W 107–105 | Cam Thomas (17) | Claxton, Williams (9) | Ben Simmons (12) | Smoothie King Center; 16,895 | 5–6 |
| 12 | November 13 | Boston | L 114–139 | Ziaire Williams (23) | Ziaire Williams (6) | Shake Milton (8) | Barclays Center; 18,112 | 5–7 |
| 13 | November 15 | @ New York | L 122–124 | Cam Thomas (43) | Ziaire Williams (8) | Dennis Schröder (8) | Madison Square Garden; 19,812 | 5–8 |
| 14 | November 17 | @ New York | L 104–114 | Cameron Johnson (22) | Jalen Wilson (6) | Ben Simmons (8) | Madison Square Garden; 19,812 | 5–9 |
| 15 | November 19 | Charlotte | W 116–115 | Cameron Johnson (34) | Ben Simmons (9) | Dennis Schröder (12) | Barclays Center; 18,117 | 6–9 |
| 16 | November 22 | @ Philadelphia | L 98–113 | Cameron Johnson (37) | Nic Claxton (8) | Schröder, Thomas (7) | Wells Fargo Center; 19,817 | 6–10 |
| 17 | November 24 | @ Sacramento | W 108–103 | Cam Thomas (34) | Nic Claxton (7) | Cam Thomas (6) | Golden 1 Center; 16,750 | 7–10 |
| 18 | November 25 | @ Golden State | W 128–120 | Dennis Schröder (31) | Ziaire Williams (10) | Dennis Schröder (7) | Chase Center; 18,064 | 8–10 |
| 19 | November 27 | @ Phoenix | W 127–117 | Tyrese Martin (30) | Ben Simmons (9) | Ben Simmons (8) | Footprint Center; 17,071 | 9–10 |
| 20 | November 29 | Orlando | L 100–123 | Shake Milton (22) | Claxton, Simmons (7) | Ben Simmons (8) | Barclays Center; 18,143 | 9–11 |

December: 3–9 (home: 1–5; road: 2–4)

| Game | Date | Team | Score | High points | High rebounds | High assists | Location Attendance | Record |
|---|---|---|---|---|---|---|---|---|
| 21 | December 1 | Orlando | L 92–100 | Cameron Johnson (26) | Nic Claxton (7) | Dennis Schröder (7) | Barclays Center; 16,505 | 9–12 |
| 22 | December 2 | @ Chicago | L 102–128 | Dariq Whitehead (18) | Nic Claxton (8) | Dennis Schröder (10) | United Center; 19,131 | 9–13 |
| 23 | December 4 | Indiana | W 99–90 | Cameron Johnson (26) | Nic Claxton (8) | Ben Simmons (9) | Barclays Center; 16,748 | 10–13 |
| 24 | December 8 | Milwaukee | L 113–118 | Dennis Schröder (34) | Nic Claxton (10) | Dennis Schröder (11) | Barclays Center; 17,926 | 10–14 |
| 25 | December 13 | @ Memphis | L 119–135 | Dorian Finney-Smith (19) | Claxton, C. Johnson (7) | Schröder, Simmons (8) | FedExForum; 15,983 | 10–15 |
| 26 | December 16 | Cleveland | L 101–130 | Cameron Johnson (22) | Day'Ron Sharpe (7) | Ben Simmons (8) | Barclays Center; 16,588 | 10–16 |
| 27 | December 19 | @ Toronto | W 101–94 | Cameron Johnson (33) | Cameron Johnson (10) | Ben Simmons (7) | Scotiabank Arena; 19,214 | 11–16 |
| 28 | December 21 | Utah | L 94–105 | Cameron Johnson (18) | Day'Ron Sharpe (9) | Ben Simmons (10) | Barclays Center; 17,926 | 11–17 |
| 29 | December 23 | @ Miami | L 95–110 | Clowney, C. Johnson (19) | Nic Claxton (10) | Ben Simmons (9) | Kaseya Center; 19,832 | 11–18 |
| 30 | December 26 | @ Milwaukee | W 111–105 | Cameron Johnson (29) | Nic Claxton (7) | Ben Simmons (9) | Fiserv Forum; 17,957 | 12–18 |
| 31 | December 27 | San Antonio | L 87–96 | Keon Johnson (25) | Nic Claxton (10) | Shake Milton (12) | Barclays Center; 17,990 | 12–19 |
| 32 | December 29 | @ Orlando | L 101–102 | Cam Thomas (25) | Ben Simmons (7) | Ben Simmons (7) | Kia Center; 19,397 | 12–20 |

January: 3–13 (home: 0–7; road: 3–6)

| Game | Date | Team | Score | High points | High rebounds | High assists | Location Attendance | Record |
|---|---|---|---|---|---|---|---|---|
| 33 | January 1 | @ Toronto | L 113–130 | Cameron Johnson (24) | Nic Claxton (10) | D'Angelo Russell (8) | Scotiabank Arena; 19,104 | 12–21 |
| 34 | January 2 | @ Milwaukee | W 113–110 | Cameron Johnson (26) | Nic Claxton (11) | D'Angelo Russell (12) | Fiserv Forum; 17,341 | 13–21 |
| 35 | January 4 | Philadelphia | L 94–123 | Ziaire Williams (19) | Keon Johnson (8) | Keon Johnson (8) | Barclays Center; 17,926 | 13–22 |
| 36 | January 6 | Indiana | L 99–113 | Day'Ron Sharpe (16) | Day'Ron Sharpe (13) | K. Johnson, Sharpe (5) | Barclays Center; 16,088 | 13–23 |
| 37 | January 8 | Detroit | L 98–113 | Noah Clowney (29) | Tyrese Martin (10) | Reece Beekman (5) | Barclays Center; 16,098 | 13–24 |
| 38 | January 10 | @ Denver | L 105–124 | Keon Johnson (22) | Nic Claxton (6) | Ben Simmons (7) | Ball Arena; 19,959 | 13–25 |
| 39 | January 12 | @ Utah | L 111–112 (OT) | Tosan Evbuomwan (22) | Nic Claxton (12) | Ben Simmons (9) | Delta Center; 18,175 | 13–26 |
| 40 | January 14 | @ Portland | W 132–114 | Cameron Johnson (24) | Ben Simmons (9) | Ben Simmons (11) | Moda Center; 16,127 | 14–26 |
| 41 | January 15 | @ L.A. Clippers | L 67–126 ^{[a]} | Jalen Wilson (16) | Day'Ron Sharpe (14) | Tyrese Martin (4) | Intuit Dome; 13,091 | 14–27 |
| 42 | January 17 | @ L.A. Lakers | L 101–102 | D'Angelo Russell (19) | Nic Claxton (8) | D'Angelo Russell (8) | Crypto.com Arena; 18,473 | 14–28 |
| 43 | January 19 | @ Oklahoma City | L 101–127 | C. Johnson, Martin (15) | Day'Ron Sharpe (7) | D'Angelo Russell (7) | Paycom Center; 18,203 | 14–29 |
| 44 | January 21 | New York | L 95–99 | D'Angelo Russell (23) | Nic Claxton (12) | D'Angelo Russell (10) | Barclays Center; 17,926 | 14–30 |
| 45 | January 22 | Phoenix | L 84–108 | Keon Johnson (20) | Nic Claxton (12) | Beekman, Wilson (3) | Barclays Center; 17,077 | 14–31 |
| 46 | January 25 | Miami | L 97–106 | K. Johnson, Russell (22) | Jalen Wilson (9) | Jalen Wilson (8) | Barclays Center; 17,962 | 14–32 |
| 47 | January 27 | Sacramento | L 96–110 | D'Angelo Russell (19) | Day'Ron Sharpe (10) | Jalen Wilson (4) | Barclays Center; 16,093 | 14–33 |
| 48 | January 29 | @ Charlotte | W 104–83 | Keon Johnson (18) | Nic Claxton (8) | D'Angelo Russell (7) | Spectrum Center; 14,307 | 15–33 |

February: 6–5 (home: 4–4; road: 2–1)

| Game | Date | Team | Score | High points | High rebounds | High assists | Location Attendance | Record |
|---|---|---|---|---|---|---|---|---|
| 49 | February 1 | @ Houston | W 110–98 | Ziaire Williams (21) | Keon Johnson (9) | Keon Johnson (5) | Toyota Center; 18,055 | 16–33 |
| 50 | February 4 | Houston | W 99–97 | Keon Johnson (22) | Ziaire Williams (7) | D'Angelo Russell (5) | Barclays Center; 16,564 | 17–33 |
| 51 | February 5 | Washington | L 102–119 | Keon Johnson (25) | Claxton, K. Johnson (6) | Ben Simmons (6) | Barclays Center; 16,035 | 17–34 |
| 52 | February 7 | Miami | W 102–86 | Cameron Johnson (18) | Nic Claxton (10) | C. Johnson, Watford, Williams (3) | Barclays Center; 17,926 | 18–34 |
| 53 | February 10 | Charlotte | W 97–89 | Nic Claxton (16) | Day'Ron Sharpe (9) | Russell, Watford (4) | Barclays Center; 16,013 | 19–34 |
| 54 | February 12 | Philadelphia | W 100–96 | D'Angelo Russell (22) | Nic Claxton (11) | D'Angelo Russell (4) | Barclays Center; 16,133 | 20–34 |
All-Star Game
| 55 | February 20 | Cleveland | L 97–110 | Cameron Johnson (18) | Day'Ron Sharpe (10) | D'Angelo Russell (5) | Barclays Center; 17,926 | 20–35 |
| 56 | February 22 | @ Philadelphia | W 105–103 | Cameron Johnson (23) | Nic Claxton (9) | Hayes, Watford (6) | Wells Fargo Center; 20,431 | 21–35 |
| 57 | February 24 | @ Washington | L 99–107 | Ziaire Williams (19) | Trendon Watford (7) | Killian Hayes (8) | Capital One Arena; 13,785 | 21–36 |
| 58 | February 26 | Oklahoma City | L 121–129 | Day'Ron Sharpe (25) | Day'Ron Sharpe (15) | Hayes, C. Johnson (7) | Barclays Center; 17,926 | 21–37 |
| 59 | February 28 | Portland | L 102–121 | Claxton, Hayes, Thomas (16) | Day'Ron Sharpe (7) | Hayes, C. Johnson (4) | Barclays Center; 18,018 | 21–38 |

March: 4–13 (home: 2–5; road: 2–8)

| Game | Date | Team | Score | High points | High rebounds | High assists | Location Attendance | Record |
|---|---|---|---|---|---|---|---|---|
| 60 | March 1 | @ Detroit | L 94–115 | Tyrese Martin (23) | Keon Johnson (8) | Day'Ron Sharpe (6) | Little Caesars Arena; 20,062 | 21–39 |
| 61 | March 4 | @ San Antonio | L 113–127 | Cam Thomas (24) | Trendon Watford (10) | Cam Thomas (6) | Frost Bank Center; 16,703 | 21–40 |
| 62 | March 6 | Golden State | L 119–121 | Cameron Johnson (26) | Nic Claxton (9) | Nic Claxton (10) | Barclays Center; 18,413 | 21–41 |
| 63 | March 8 | @ Charlotte | L 102–105 | D'Angelo Russell (28) | Claxton, Russell (6) | D'Angelo Russell (7) | Spectrum Center; 18,652 | 21–42 |
| 64 | March 10 | L.A. Lakers | W 111–108 | Noah Clowney (19) | Ziaire Williams (9) | D'Angelo Russell (7) | Barclays Center; 18,215 | 22–42 |
| 65 | March 11 | @ Cleveland | L 104–109 | Cam Thomas (27) | K. Johnson, Sharpe (7) | Trendon Watford (6) | Rocket Arena; 19,432 | 22–43 |
| 66 | March 13 | @ Chicago | L 110–116 | Cam Thomas (24) | Nic Claxton (14) | Cam Thomas (10) | United Center; 21,647 | 22–44 |
| 67 | March 15 | Boston | L 113–115 | Cameron Johnson (23) | Day'Ron Sharpe (16) | D'Angelo Russell (8) | Barclays Center; 18,016 | 22–45 |
| 68 | March 16 | Atlanta | W 122–114 | Cameron Johnson (28) | Keon Johnson (8) | Cameron Johnson (7) | Barclays Center; 17,926 | 23–45 |
| 69 | March 18 | @ Boston | L 96–104 | D'Angelo Russell (18) | Nic Claxton (9) | D'Angelo Russell (7) | TD Garden; 19,156 | 23–46 |
| 70 | March 20 | @ Indiana | L 99–105 (OT) | Russell, Williams (22) | Nic Claxton (14) | D'Angelo Russell (6) | Gainbridge Fieldhouse; 15,008 | 23–47 |
| 71 | March 22 | @ Indiana | L 103–108 | Trendon Watford (26) | Nic Claxton (10) | C. Johnson, Martin (5) | Gainbridge Fieldhouse; 17,274 | 23–48 |
| 72 | March 24 | Dallas | L 101–120 | Nic Claxton (19) | Claxton, Sharpe (7) | Cameron Johnson (8) | Barclays Center; 16,434 | 23–49 |
| 73 | March 26 | Toronto | L 86–116 | Nic Claxton (22) | Nic Claxton (11) | Keon Johnson (5) | Barclays Center; 16,413 | 23–50 |
| 74 | March 28 | L.A. Clippers | L 100–132 | Keon Johnson (13) | Drew Timme (10) | Cameron Johnson (6) | Barclays Center; 17,926 | 23–51 |
| 75 | March 29 | @ Washington | W 115–112 | Martin, Wilson (20) | Cameron Johnson (9) | Cameron Johnson (7) | Capital One Arena; 16,316 | 24–51 |
| 76 | March 31 | @ Dallas | W 113–109 | Keon Johnson (24) | Nic Claxton (7) | D'Angelo Russell (11) | American Airlines Center; 19,790 | 25–51 |

April: 1–5 (home: 1–4; road: 0–1)

| Game | Date | Team | Score | High points | High rebounds | High assists | Location Attendance | Record |
|---|---|---|---|---|---|---|---|---|
| 77 | April 3 | Minnesota | L 90–105 | Nic Claxton (18) | Tosan Evbuomwan (8) | Claxton, Etienne, Watford (5) | Barclays Center; 17,926 | 25–52 |
| 78 | April 6 | Toronto | L 109–120 | Reece Beekman (14) | Evbuomwan, K. Johnson, Timme (7) | Reece Beekman (5) | Barclays Center; 17,007 | 25–53 |
| 79 | April 8 | New Orleans | W 119–114 | Trendon Watford (22) | Drew Timme (9) | Reece Beekman (10) | Barclays Center; 16,407 | 26–53 |
| 80 | April 10 | Atlanta | L 109–133 | Jalen Wilson (20) | Drew Timme (11) | Drew Timme (6) | Barclays Center; 17,926 | 26–54 |
| 81 | April 11 | @ Minnesota | L 91–117 | Keon Johnson (20) | Drew Timme (10) | Keon Johnson (6) | Target Center; 18,978 | 26–55 |
| 82 | April 13 | New York | L 105–113 | Martin, Watford (20) | Keon Johnson (9) | Tosan Evbuomwan (5) | Barclays Center; 17,926 | 26–56 |

2024–25 season schedule

^{a} This score marked the largest margin of defeat in Nets franchise history.

=== NBA Cup ===
The groups were revealed during the tournament announcement on July 12, 2024.

==== East Group A ====
| Pos | Team | Pld | W | L | PF | PA | PD | Qualification |
|---|---|---|---|---|---|---|---|---|
| 1 | New York Knicks | 4 | 4 | 0 | 455 | 425 | +30 | Advance to knockout stage |
| 2 | Orlando Magic | 4 | 3 | 1 | 441 | 396 | +45 | Advance to knockout stage |
| 3 | Philadelphia 76ers | 4 | 2 | 2 | 408 | 411 | −3 | |
| 4 | Brooklyn Nets | 4 | 1 | 3 | 436 | 475 | −39 | |
| 5 | Charlotte Hornets | 4 | 0 | 4 | 406 | 439 | −33 | |

Source: NBA
Rules for classification: Tiebreakers

== Player statistics ==
Legend
| GP | Games played | GS | Games started | MPG | Minutes per game |
| FG% | Field-goal percentage | 3P% | 3-point field-goal percentage | FT% | Free-throw percentage |
| RPG | Rebounds per game | APG | Assists per game | SPG | Steals per game |
| BPG | Blocks per game | PPG | Points per game |

=== Regular season ===
Brooklyn Nets statistics
| Player | GP | GS | MPG | FG% | 3P% | FT% | RPG | APG | SPG | BPG | PPG |
|---|---|---|---|---|---|---|---|---|---|---|---|
| Reece Beekman^{†} | 34 | 4 | 13.7 | .321 | .175 | 762 | 1.1 | 1.8 | .9 | .1 | 2.7 |
| Nic Claxton | 70 | 62 | 26.9 | .563 | .238 | .513 | 7.4 | 2.2 | .9 | 1.4 | 10.3 |
| Noah Clowney | 46 | 20 | 22.7 | .358 | .333 | .838 | 3.9 | .9 | .5 | .5 | 9.1 |
| Tyson Etienne | 7 | 0 | 21.6 | .327 | .295 | .800 | 1.3 | 1.7 | .4 | .1 | 7.9 |
| Tosan Evbuomwan | 28 | 0 | 23.8 | .427 | .312 | .753 | 4.3 | 2.0 | .9 | .3 | 9.5 |
| Dorian Finney-Smith^{†} | 20 | 20 | 29.0 | .459 | .435 | .625 | 4.6 | 1.6 | .9 | .6 | 10.4 |
| Killian Hayes | 6 | 5 | 27.0 | .419 | .381 | .833 | 3.0 | 5.2 | .7 | .7 | 9.0 |
| Cameron Johnson | 57 | 57 | 31.6 | .475 | .390 | .893 | 4.3 | 3.4 | .9 | .4 | 18.8 |
| Keon Johnson | 79 | 56 | 24.4 | .389 | .314 | .770 | 3.8 | 2.2 | 1.0 | .4 | 10.6 |
| Maxwell Lewis^{†} | 21 | 1 | 14.2 | .422 | .380 | .700 | 2.5 | .8 | .4 | .3 | 5.3 |
| Jaylen Martin^{†} | 3 | 0 | 1.7 | .500 | 1.000 | | .0 | .0 | .0 | .0 | 1.0 |
| Tyrese Martin | 60 | 11 | 21.9 | .406 | .351 | .793 | 3.7 | 2.0 | .6 | .2 | 8.7 |
| Shake Milton^{†} | 27 | 1 | 18.2 | .465 | .389 | .758 | 1.9 | 2.4 | .6 | .0 | 7.4 |
| D'Angelo Russell^{†} | 29 | 26 | 24.7 | .367 | .297 | .826 | 2.9 | 5.6 | 1.1 | .7 | 12.9 |
| Dennis Schröder^{†} | 23 | 23 | 33.6 | .452 | .387 | .889 | 3.0 | 6.6 | 1.1 | .2 | 18.4 |
| Day'Ron Sharpe | 50 | 2 | 18.1 | .521 | .244 | .757 | 6.6 | 1.8 | .8 | .8 | 7.9 |
| Ben Simmons^{†} | 33 | 24 | 25.0 | .547 | | .692 | 7.9 | 5.7 | .8 | .6 | 6.1 |
| Cam Thomas | 25 | 23 | 31.2 | .438 | .349 | .881 | 3.3 | 3.8 | .6 | .1 | 24.0 |
| Drew Timme | 9 | 2 | 28.2 | .441 | .257 | .625 | 7.2 | 2.2 | .4 | .1 | 12.1 |
| Trendon Watford | 44 | 6 | 20.8 | .469 | .330 | .762 | 3.6 | 2.6 | .6 | .3 | 10.2 |
| Dariq Whitehead | 20 | 0 | 12.3 | .406 | .446 | .600 | 1.5 | .6 | .3 | .1 | 5.7 |
| Ziaire Williams | 63 | 45 | 24.5 | .412 | .341 | .821 | 4.6 | 1.3 | 1.0 | .4 | 10.0 |
| Jalen Wilson | 79 | 22 | 25.7 | .397 | .337 | .818 | 3.4 | 1.8 | .5 | .1 | 9.5 |
| Cui Yongxi | 5 | 0 | 2.0 | .143 | .000 | .500 | .4 | .0 | .0 | .0 | .6 |

- ^{†} Denotes player spent time with another team in the season. Stats reflect time with the Nets only.

== Transactions ==
=== Trades ===
| June 26, 2024 | To Brooklyn Nets 2025 BKN first-round pick swap right relinquished 2026 BKN first-round pick returned | To Houston Rockets 2025 PHX first-round pick swap right 2027 PHX first-round pick 2029 first-round pick 2029 first-round pick swap right |
| July 6, 2024 | To Brooklyn Nets Bojan Bogdanović; Mamadi Diakite; Shake Milton (sign-and-trade); 2025 MIL protected first-round pick 2025 NYK first-round pick 2025 BKN second-round pick 2027 NYK first-round pick 2028 NYK first-round pick swap 2029 NYK first-round pick 2031 NYK first-round pick | To New York Knicks Keita Bates-Diop; Mikal Bridges; Draft rights to Juan Pablo Vaulet (2015 No. 39); 2026 second-round pick |
| July 19, 2024 | To Brooklyn Nets Ziaire Williams; 2030 DAL second-round pick | To Memphis Grizzlies Mamadi Diakite; Draft rights to Nemanja Dangubić (2014 No. 54) |
| December 15, 2024 | To Brooklyn Nets De'Anthony Melton; Reece Beekman (Two-way contract); 2026 ATL second-round pick 2028 ATL second-round pick 2029 GSW second-round pick | To Golden State Warriors Dennis Schröder; 2025 MIA protected second-round pick |
| December 29, 2024 | To Brooklyn Nets D'Angelo Russell; Maxwell Lewis; 2027 LAL second-round pick 2030 LAL second-round pick 2031 LAL second-round pick | To Los Angeles Lakers Dorian Finney-Smith; Shake Milton |

=== Free agency ===
==== Re-signed ====
| Date | Player | Ref. |
|---|---|---|
| July 6 | Nic Claxton | |

==== Additions ====
| Date | Player | Former team | Ref. |

==== Subtractions ====
| Date | Player | Reason left | New team | Ref. |
