= Ziaire Williams =

American basketball player (born 2001)

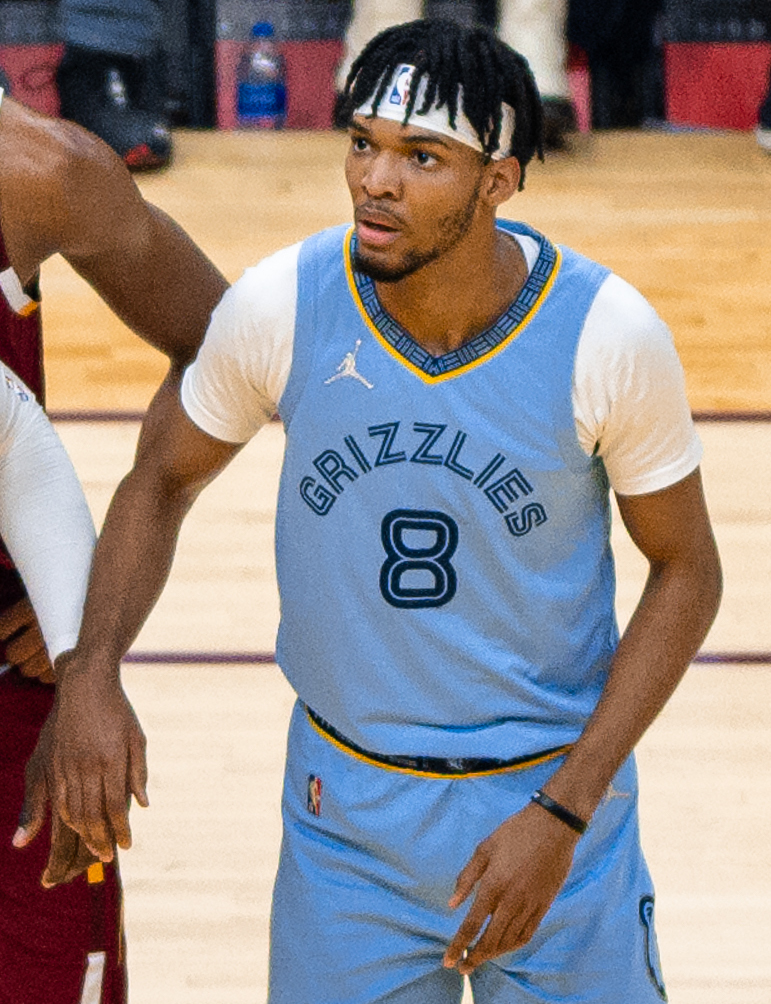
- Williams with the Memphis Grizzlies in 2022

No. 11 – Los Angeles Lakers
- Position: Power forward / Small forward
- League: NBA

Personal information
- Born: September 12, 2001 (age 25) Lancaster, California, U.S.
- Listed height: 6 ft 9 in (2.06 m)
- Listed weight: 185 lb (84 kg)

Career information
- High school: Notre Dame (Sherman Oaks, California); Sierra Canyon (Chatsworth, California)
- College: Stanford (2020–2021)
- NBA draft: 2021: 1st round, 10th overall pick
- Drafted by: New Orleans Pelicans
- Playing career: 2021–present

Career history
- 2021–2024: Memphis Grizzlies
- 2023: →Memphis Hustle
- 2024–2026: Brooklyn Nets
- 2026–present: Los Angeles Lakers

Career highlights
- McDonald's All-American (2020)
- Stats at NBA.com
- Stats at Basketball Reference
Medals
Men's basketball
Representing United States
FIBA Under-19 World Cup
Gold medal – first place	2019 Greece	Team

Ziaire Williams Jr. (/zaɪˈɛər/ zy-AIR; born September 12, 2001) is an American professional basketball player for the Los Angeles Lakers of the National Basketball Association (NBA). He played college basketball for the Stanford Cardinal.

== Early life ==
Williams was born in Lancaster, California as the only child of Ziaire Williams Sr. and Marquita Fields-Williams on September 12, 2001. He began playing basketball at age five and was training under the guidance of his father by age eight.

== High school career ==
For his first three years of high school, Williams attended Notre Dame High School in Sherman Oaks, Los Angeles. In his freshman season, he averaged 13.6 points and 6.5 rebounds per game. Williams missed much of his sophomore season with an injury but saw success in the summer with his club team BTI Select. On January 14, 2019, as a junior, he was named Los Angeles Daily News boys athlete of the week following two consecutive games with at least 34 points. In his junior season, Williams averaged 27 points, 10 rebounds, and three assists per game. He earned All-Mission League first team and USA Today All-USA California second team honors.

On July 18, 2019, Williams transferred to Sierra Canyon School in Chatsworth, Los Angeles for his senior year. He joined the team with fellow five-star recruit BJ Boston, as well as Bronny James and Zaire Wade, the respective sons of basketball players LeBron James and Dwyane Wade. Williams was not eligible to play until December 29, due to CIF Southern Section (CIF-SS) transfer rules, and missed more than 10 games. In his season debut, he scored 28 points in an 85–81 overtime loss to Rancho Christian School. On March 11, 2020, Williams scored 17 points and made a buzzer-beater in a 63–61 comeback win over Etiwanda High School. As a senior, he averaged 15 points, 7.9 rebounds and 3.6 assists per game, helping Sierra Canyon win the CIF-SS Open Division title. He was named player of the year by the Los Angeles Times. Williams was selected to play in the McDonald's All-American Game, Jordan Brand Classic and Nike Hoop Summit, but all three games were canceled due to the COVID-19 pandemic.

=== Recruiting ===
Williams was a consensus five-star recruit and the number one small forward in the 2020 recruiting class. On April 12, 2020, he announced his commitment to Stanford over Arizona, USC, North Carolina and UCLA. Williams became Stanford's highest-ranked recruit in the modern recruiting era and the program's first five-star recruit since Reid Travis in 2014.

College recruiting
Name	Hometown	School	Height	Weight	Commit date
Ziaire Williams; SF	Lancaster, CA	Sierra Canyon (CA)	6 ft 7 in (2.01 m)	180 lb (82 kg)	Apr 12, 2020
Ziaire Williams; SF	Recruit ratings: Rivals: 247Sports: ESPN: (95)				
Overall recruit ranking: Rivals: 6 247Sports: 5 ESPN: 8
Note: In many cases, Scout, Rivals, 247Sports, On3, and ESPN may conflict in their listings of height and weight.; In these cases, the average was taken. ESPN grades are on a 100-point scale.; Sources: "Stanford 2020 Basketball Commitments". Rivals.; "2020 Stanford Cardinal Recruiting Class". ESPN.; "2020 Team Ranking". Rivals.

== College career ==
In his collegiate debut for Stanford on November 30, 2020, Williams scored 19 points and grabbed eight rebounds in an 82–64 win against Alabama. On January 7, 2021, he recorded 12 points, 12 rebounds and 10 assists, the first triple-double by a Stanford player since 2007, in a 91–75 victory over Washington. As a freshman, Williams averaged 10.7 points, 4.6 rebounds and 2.2 assists per game, shooting 37.4 percent from the field. On March 31, he declared for the 2021 NBA draft, forgoing his remaining college eligibility.

== Professional career ==
=== Memphis Grizzlies (2021–2024) ===
On July 29, 2021, Williams was selected with the tenth overall pick in the 2021 NBA draft by the New Orleans Pelicans, then traded to the Memphis Grizzlies. After missing 14 consecutive games due to an ankle injury and a stint in the NBA's COVID-19 protocols, Williams got his first career start on January 6, 2022, recording 14 points and two steals in a 118–88 win over the Pistons. On February 2, Williams set a career-high with 21 points in a 120–108 win over the New York Knicks. He then tied that record on February 24, in a 114–119 loss to the Minnesota Timberwolves. During the first round of the playoffs, the Grizzlies faced the Timberwolves. Williams made his playoff debut on April 16, scoring four points in a 117–130 Game 1 loss. The Grizzlies ended up winning the series in six games, but were eliminated during the second round by the Golden State Warriors in six games.

Williams missed the first 24 games of the 2022–23 season with a right knee injury. He made his season debut on December 7, 2022, recording four points, six rebounds, three assists and two steals in a 123–102 win over the Oklahoma City Thunder. On January 22, 2023, Williams made a 79-foot, three-point shot against the Phoenix Suns, heaving the ball from beyond half court as the third quarter expired.

=== Brooklyn Nets (2024–2026) ===
On July 19, 2024, Williams was traded to the Brooklyn Nets alongside a second-round pick in exchange for Mamadi Diakite and the draft rights to Nemanja Dangubić. He made 63 appearances (45 starts) for Brooklyn during the 2024–25 NBA season, averaging 10.0 points, 4.6 rebounds, and 1.3 assists.

On June 30, 2025, Williams re-signed with the Nets on a two-year, $12.5 million contract. He made 56 appearances (including 13 starts) for Brooklyn during the 2025–26 season, averaging 10.2 points, 2.4 rebounds, and 1.1 assists. On June 28, 2026, the Nets declined Williams' $6.3 million team option for the 2026–27 season, making him an unrestricted free agent.

=== Los Angeles Lakers (2026–present) ===
On July 19, 2026, Williams signed a one-year, $3 million contract with the Los Angeles Lakers. On October 21, he made his Lakers debut, recording nine points, three rebounds and four assists in a 127–105 win over the Golden State Warriors. On October 26th, Williams was fined $2,000 by the NBA after a flopping act during the game against the Utah Jazz.

== National team career ==
Williams played for the United States at the 2019 FIBA Under-19 Basketball World Cup in Heraklion, Greece. In seven games, he averaged 5.3 points and 1.2 assists per game, helping his team win the gold medal.

== Career statistics ==
Legend
GP	Games played	GS	Games started	MPG	Minutes per game
FG%	Field goal percentage	3P%	3-point field goal percentage	FT%	Free throw percentage
RPG	Rebounds per game	APG	Assists per game	SPG	Steals per game
BPG	Blocks per game	PPG	Points per game	**Bold**	Career high

=== NBA ===
==== Regular season ====
Year	Team	GP	GS	MPG	FG%	3P%	FT%	RPG	APG	SPG	BPG	PPG
2021–22	Memphis	62	31	21.7	**.450**	.314	.782	2.1	1.0	.6	.2	8.1
2022–23	Memphis	37	4	15.2	.429	.258	.773	2.1	.9	.4	.2	5.7
2023–24	Memphis	51	15	20.3	.397	.307	.827	3.5	**1.5**	.7	.2	8.2
2024–25	Brooklyn	**63**	**45**	**24.5**	.412	.341	.821	**4.6**	1.3	1.0	**.4**	10.0
2025–26	Brooklyn	56	13	22.9	.425	**.343**	**.850**	2.4	1.1	**1.4**	**.4**	**10.2**
Career		269	108	21.4	.422	.322	.824	3.0	1.2	.8	.3	8.7

==== Playoffs ====
Year	Team	GP	GS	MPG	FG%	3P%	FT%	RPG	APG	SPG	BPG	PPG
2022	Memphis	**10**	**1**	**16.8**	**.442**	.306	.923	**1.6**	**.5**	**.5**	.0	**6.9**
2023	Memphis	4	0	3.0	.286	**.333**	–	.5	**.5**	.0	.0	1.3
Career		14	1	12.8	.424	.308	.923	1.3	.5	.4	.0	5.3

=== College ===
Year	Team	GP	GS	MPG	FG%	3P%	FT%	RPG	APG	SPG	BPG	PPG
2020–21	Stanford	20	14	27.9	.374	.291	.796	4.6	2.2	.9	.6	10.7

== Personal life ==
Both of Williams' parents have served in the military: his mother, Marquita Fields-Williams, in the Army and Air Force, and his father, Ziaire Williams, in the Marine Corps. His mother is a probation officer, and his father works for 7 Up in Sylmar, Los Angeles.
