= Bob Kessler =

American basketball player

Personal information
- Born: Alexandria, Virginia, U.S.
- Listed height: 6 ft 4 in (1.93 m)
- Listed weight: 190 lb (86 kg)

Career information
- High school: George Washington (Alexandria, Virginia)
- College: Maryland (1953–1956)
- NBA draft: 1956: 2nd round, 14th overall pick
- Drafted by: Fort Wayne Pistons
- Position: Small forward

Career highlights
- 2× Second-team All-ACC (1955, 1956)
- Stats at Basketball Reference

Robert Kessler is an American former college basketball standout for the Maryland Terrapins. He played for the school for three seasons, from 1953–54 to 1955–56, and scored 1,266 points and grabbed 849 rebounds in his career. Kessler was named to the All-ACC Second Team in his final two seasons while averaging over 20 points per game each year. He led the Terrapins in rebounding both seasons, and after his collegiate career was over, Kessler was selected as the 14th overall pick in the 1956 NBA draft by the Fort Wayne Zollner Pistons. He never played in the league, however. Later on he would get enshrined into the University of Maryland Athletic Hall of Fame as part of the 2007 class. He is currently a scout for Cheyenne East High School in Cheyenne, WY, USA.
