= Atlantic Coast Conference men's basketball =

American collegiate basketball conference

The Atlantic Coast Conference (founded in 1953) is one of the premier college basketball conferences in NCAA Division I. The current ACC champions are the Duke men's basketball team.

== Members ==
Institution	Nickname	Location	Founded	Years in the ACC	School Type	Enrollment
Boston College	Eagles	Chestnut Hill, Massachusetts	1863	2005–present	Private/Catholic (Jesuit)	15,106
California	Golden Bears	Berkeley, California	1868	2024–present	Public	45,307
Clemson	Tigers	Clemson, South Carolina	1889	1953–present	Public	29,077
Duke	Blue Devils	Durham, North Carolina	1838	1953–present	Private/Nonsectarian	16,780
Florida State	Seminoles	Tallahassee, Florida	1851	1991–present	Public (State University System of Florida)	44,308
Georgia Tech	Yellow Jackets	Atlanta, Georgia	1885	1978–present	Public (University System of Georgia)	47,961
Louisville	Cardinals	Louisville, Kentucky	1798	2014–present	Public	24,123
Miami	Hurricanes	Coral Gables, Florida	1925	2004–present	Private/Nonsectarian	19,852
North Carolina	Tar Heels	Chapel Hill, North Carolina	1789	1953–present	Public (University of North Carolina)	32,234
NC State	Wolfpack	Raleigh, North Carolina	1887	1953–present	Public (University of North Carolina)	37,873
Notre Dame	Fighting Irish	South Bend, Indiana	1842	2013–present	Private/Catholic (Congregation of Holy Cross)	13,174
Pittsburgh	Panthers	Pittsburgh, Pennsylvania	1787	2013–present	State-related/Nonsectarian	31,237
SMU	Mustangs	Highland Park, Texas	1911	2024–present	Private/Nonsectarian	12,544
Stanford	Cardinal	Stanford, California	1885	2024–present	Private/Non-denominational	17,529
Syracuse	Orange	Syracuse, New York	1870	2013–present	Private/Nonsectarian	22,589
Virginia	Cavaliers	Charlottesville, Virginia	1819	1953–present	Public	25,944
Virginia Tech	Hokies	Blacksburg, Virginia	1872	2004–present	Public	38,294
Wake Forest	Demon Deacons	Winston-Salem, North Carolina	1834	1953–present	Private/Nonsectarian	9,121

== History ==
The early roots of ACC basketball began primarily thanks to two men: Everett Case and Frank McGuire. Case had been a successful high school coach in Indiana who accepted the head coaching job at North Carolina State at a time that the school's athletic department had decided to focus on competing in football on a level with Duke, then a national power in college football. Case's North Carolina State teams dominated the early years of the ACC with a modern, fast-paced style of play. He became the fastest college basketball coach to reach many "games won" milestones.

Case eventually became known as The Father of ACC Basketball. Despite his success on the court, he may have been even a better promoter off-the-court. Case realized the need to sell his program and university. State had originally started construction on Reynolds Coliseum in 1941, but stopped construction during the war. It was originally slated to seat 10,000 people, but Case persuaded school officials to expand the arena to 12,400 people. It opened as the new home court for his team in 1949; at the time, it was the largest on-campus arena in the South. As such, it was used as the host site for many Southern Conference tournaments, ACC tournaments, and the Dixie Classic, an annual event involving the four ACC teams from North Carolina as well as four other prominent programs from across the nation. The Dixie Classic brought in large revenues for all schools involved and soon became one of the premier sporting events in the South.

Partly to counter Case's personality, as well as the dominant success of his program, North Carolina convinced St. John's head coach Frank McGuire to come to Chapel Hill in 1952. McGuire knew that largely due to Case's influence, basketball was now the major high school athletic event of the region, unlike football in the South. He not only tapped the growing market of high school talent in North Carolina, but also brought several recruits from his home territory in New York City as well. Case and McGuire literally invented a rivalry. Both men realized the benefits created through a rivalry between them. It brought more national attention to both of their programs and increased fan support on both sides. For this reason, they often exchanged verbal jabs at each other in public, while maintaining a secret working relationship in private.

After State was slapped with crippling NCAA sanctions before the 1956–57 season, McGuire's North Carolina team stepped into the breach and delivered the ACC its first national championship. During the Tar Heels' championship run, Greensboro entrepreneur Castleman D. Chesley noticed the popularity that it generated. He hastily cobbled together a five-station television network to broadcast the Final Four. That network began broadcasting regular season ACC games the following season. From that point on, ACC basketball gained large popularity. Chesley's network continued until Metrosports took it over in 1981, handing it to Raycom Sports took it over in 1982; it was the direct ancestor of today's ACC Network.

== Scheduling partners ==
The table below lists each school's permanent men's basketball only scheduling partners after expansion in 2024.

School	Partner 1	Partner 2
Boston College	Notre Dame	Syracuse
California	SMU	Stanford
Clemson	Florida State	Georgia Tech
Duke	North Carolina	Wake Forest
Florida State	Clemson	Miami
Georgia Tech	Clemson	Notre Dame
Louisville	Pittsburgh	Virginia
Miami	Florida State	Virginia Tech
North Carolina	Duke	NC State
NC State	North Carolina	Wake Forest
Notre Dame	Boston College	Georgia Tech
Pittsburgh	Louisville	Syracuse
SMU	California	Stanford
Stanford	California	SMU
Syracuse	Boston College	Pittsburgh
Virginia	Louisville	Virginia Tech
Virginia Tech	Miami	Virginia
Wake Forest	Duke	NC State

== Men's basketball titles by school ==
As explained in the main article about the league, the ACC does not recognize any team other than the conference tournament winner as the champion for a given season. Accordingly, this table sorts the schools primarily by number of tournament wins, using first-place regular season finishes and NCAA championships as tiebreakers where needed.

Team	Regular season first-place finishes	ACC tournament championships	NCAA Championships
Duke	22	24	5
North Carolina	32	18	6
NC State	7	11	2
Wake Forest	4	4	0
Georgia Tech	2	4	0
Virginia	11	3	1
Maryland	5	3	1
Miami	2	1	0
Florida State	1	1	0
South Carolina	1	1	0
Notre Dame	0	1	0
Virginia Tech	0	1	0
Clemson	1	0	0
Louisville	0	0	3 (Note: The third national title, in 2013, was ordered vacated by the NCAA due to sanctions stemming from an NCAA decision.)
California	0	0	1
Stanford	0	0	1
Syracuse	0	0	1
Boston College	0	0	0
Pittsburgh	0	0	0
SMU	0	0	0
