= Othell Wilson =

American basketball player and coach

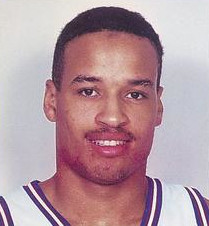

Personal information
- Born: October 26, 1961 (age 65) Alexandria, Virginia, U.S.
- Listed height: 6 ft 0 in (1.83 m)
- Listed weight: 190 lb (86 kg)

Career information
- High school: Gar-Field (Woodbridge, Virginia)
- College: Virginia (1980–1984)
- NBA draft: 1984: 2nd round, 35th overall pick
- Drafted by: Golden State Warriors
- Playing career: 1984–1987
- Position: Point guard
- Number: 11, 2

Career history
- 1984–1985: Golden State Warriors
- 1986: Wildwood Aces
- 1986–1987: Sacramento Kings
- 1987: Philadelphia Aces
- 1987–1988: Savannah Spirits

Career highlights
- First-team All-ACC (1982); 2× Second-team All-ACC (1983, 1984)
- Stats at NBA.com
- Stats at Basketball Reference

Coatlen Othell Wilson (born October 26, 1961) is an American former professional basketball player.

A 6-foot-0-inch (183 cm), 190-pound (86 kg) point guard, Othell Wilson attended Woodbridge High School and Gar-Field Senior High School, both in Virginia.

He played collegiately at the University of Virginia from 1980 to 1984. At UVa, he scored 1469 points, handed out 493 assists, and was credited with 222 steals in his 127 collegiate games. He was named to three All ACC teams and played in two Final Fours.

Wilson was selected by the Golden State Warriors with the 11th pick in the 2nd round of the 1984 NBA draft.

During his rookie season with the Warriors, he averaged 4.4 points, 1.8 rebounds and 2.9 assists in 74 games. After not playing for any NBA team during the following season, he played 53 games with the Sacramento Kings in 1986–87.

Wilson was hired as head coach at St. Mary's College, Maryland in 2000. Soon afterward, he faced an accusation that he kidnapped and raped his former girlfriend in September 1999. Acquitted of that charge, his contract was not renewed after one season. His coaching contract was not renewed the following July.

== Career statistics ==
Legend
GP	Games played	GS	Games started	MPG	Minutes per game
FG%	Field goal percentage	3P%	3-point field goal percentage	FT%	Free throw percentage
RPG	Rebounds per game	APG	Assists per game	SPG	Steals per game
BPG	Blocks per game	PPG	Points per game	**Bold**	Career high

=== NBA ===
==== Regular season ====
Year	Team	GP	GS	MPG	FG%	3P%	FT%	RPG	APG	SPG	BPG	PPG
1984–85	Golden State	**74**	**23**	**17.0**	**.460**	**.188**	.711	**1.8**	2.9	**1.0**	**.2**	**4.4**
1986–87	Sacramento	53	2	14.9	.443	.167	**.796**	1.5	**3.9**	.8	.1	4.0
Career		127	25	16.1	.454	.176	.746	1.7	3.3	.9	.1	4.2
