= Reece Beekman =

American basketball player (born 2001)

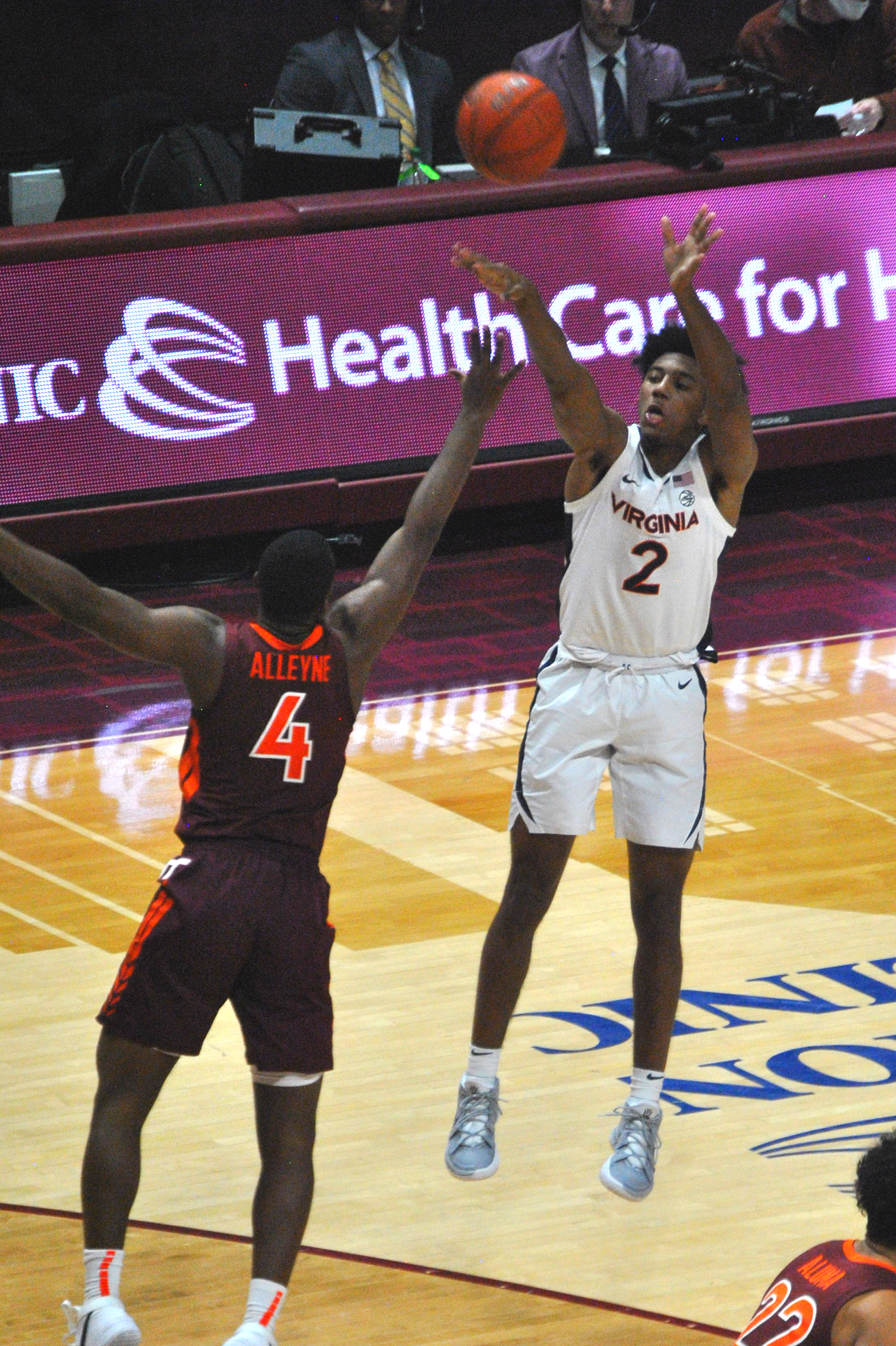
- Beekman with Virginia in 2022

No. 26 – Washington Wizards
- Position: Point guard
- League: NBA

Personal information
- Born: October 8, 2001 (age 25) Milwaukee, Wisconsin, U.S.
- Listed height: 6 ft 1 in (1.85 m)
- Listed weight: 190 lb (86 kg)

Career information
- High school: Scotlandville Magnet (Baton Rouge, Louisiana)
- College: Virginia (2020–2024)
- NBA draft: 2024: undrafted
- Playing career: 2024–present

Career history
- 2024: Golden State Warriors
- 2024: →Santa Cruz Warriors
- 2024–2025: Brooklyn Nets
- 2024–2025: →Long Island Nets
- 2025–2026: Osceola Magic
- 2026–present: Washington Wizards
- 2026–present: →Capital City Go-Go

Career highlights
- 2× ACC Defensive Player of the Year (2023, 2024); Second-team All-ACC (2024); Third-team All-ACC (2023); 3× ACC All-Defensive Team (2022–2024); Louisiana Mr. Basketball (2020)
- Stats at NBA.com
- Stats at Basketball Reference

Reece Avery Beekman (born October 8, 2001) is an American professional basketball player for the Washington Wizards of the National Basketball Association (NBA), on a two-way contract with the Capital City Go-Go of the NBA G League. He played college basketball for the Virginia Cavaliers.

== Early life ==
Beekman was born in Milwaukee, Wisconsin. At the age of 13, he moved to Baton Rouge, Louisiana with his mother and brother. He attended Scotlandville High School and played basketball throughout his four years at the school.

== High school career ==
Beekman was a four-year letter-winner from 2017 to 2020 under head coach Carlos Sample at Scotlandville Magnet HS. During his tenure, he led the Hornets to an impressive 131–14 record and four Louisiana High School Athletic Associate (LHSAA) 5A state championships. He also earned Louisiana Mr. Basketball honors after averaging 19.4 points, 9.1 rebounds, 9.9 assists, 2.7 blocked shots, and 2.2 steals as a senior in 2019–20.

=== Recruiting ===
As a four-star recruit, Beekman started getting offers in the Spring of 2018, but it wasn't until late July 2018 that he got his Virginia offer. During this recruitment process, Beekman received 21 offers including Florida, LSU, Wisconsin, and USC. Beekman would go on his official visit to UVA in November 2018 but wanted to wait a few months before he committed. On June 13, 2019, Beekman had a surprise commitment to Virginia. It was not until December 10, 2019, that he signed his Letter of Intent to play at UVA.

College recruiting
Name	Hometown	School	Height	Weight	Commit date
Reece Beekman; PG	Baton Rouge, LA	Scotlandville Magnet (LA)	6 ft 2 in (1.88 m)	160 lb (73 kg)	Jun 13, 2019
Reece Beekman; PG	Recruit ratings: Rivals: 247Sports: ESPN: (86)				
Overall recruit ranking: Rivals: 72 247Sports: 69 ESPN: 51
Note: In many cases, Scout, Rivals, 247Sports, On3, and ESPN may conflict in their listings of height and weight.; In these cases, the average was taken. ESPN grades are on a 100-point scale.; Sources: "Virginia 2020 Basketball Commitments". Rivals.; "2020 Virginia Cavaliers Recruiting Class". ESPN.; "2020 Team Ranking". Rivals.

== College career ==
On August 1, 2020, Beekman enrolled at UVA. He took over as one of the starting guards early into the season due to his impressive performances. During the ACC tournament, Beekman hit a game-winning buzzer-beater to beat Syracuse and advance to the semifinals. Through his first season, Beekman has averaged 4.7 points, 2.8 rebounds, and three assists while shooting 38.2% from the field. As a sophomore, he was named to the ACC All-Defensive Team as well as Honorable Mention All-ACC.

== Professional career ==
=== Golden State Warriors (2024) ===
After going undrafted in the 2024 NBA draft, Beekman signed a two-way contract with the Golden State Warriors on July 3, 2024.

=== Brooklyn Nets (2024–2025) ===
On December 15, 2024, Beekman was traded to the Brooklyn Nets alongside De'Anthony Melton and three future second-round picks in exchange for Dennis Schröder and a 2025 second-round pick. He made 34 appearances (four starts) for Brooklyn during the 2024–25 NBA season, averaging 2.7 points, 1.1 rebounds, and 1.8 assists.

=== Osceola Magic (2025–2026) ===
On June 29, 2025, Beekman signed with the Denver Nuggets for the 2025 NBA Summer League. On September 2, he signed a training camp contract with the Orlando Magic. Beekman was waived by the Magic on October 18.

=== Washington Wizards (2026–present) ===
On July 7, 2026, Beekman signed with the Washington Wizards for the 2026 NBA Summer League. On September 27, 2026, the Wizards announced Beekman as part of their training camp roster, and on October 17, 2026, the Wizards converted Beekman's contract to a two-way contract, splitting time with their NBA G League affiliate, the Capital City Go-Go.

== Career statistics ==
Legend
GP	Games played	GS	Games started	MPG	Minutes per game
FG%	Field goal percentage	3P%	3-point field goal percentage	FT%	Free throw percentage
RPG	Rebounds per game	APG	Assists per game	SPG	Steals per game
BPG	Blocks per game	PPG	Points per game	**Bold**	Career high

=== NBA ===
==== Regular season ====
Year	Team	GP	GS	MPG	FG%	3P%	FT%	RPG	APG	SPG	BPG	PPG
2024–25	Golden State	2	0	2.0	1.000	.0	.0	.5	.5	.5	.0	1.0
2024–25	Brooklyn	**34**	**4**	**13.7**	**.321**	.175	.762	1.1	**1.8**	**.9**	**.1**	**2.7**
Career		36	4	13.0	.327	.175	.762	1.1	1.8	.9	.1	2.6

=== College ===
Year	Team	GP	GS	MPG	FG%	3P%	FT%	RPG	APG	SPG	BPG	PPG
2020–21	Virginia	25	20	29.4	.382	.243	.758	2.8	3.0	1.2	.4	4.7
2021–22	Virginia	**35**	**35**	**35.1**	**.449**	.338	.761	**3.9**	5.2	**2.1**	**.7**	8.2
2022–23	Virginia	32	32	32.6	.405	**.351**	**.793**	3.0	5.3	1.8	.5	9.5
2023–24	Virginia	34	34	32.8	.443	.310	.754	3.6	**6.2**	2.0	.5	**14.3**
Career		126	121	32.7	.429	.319	.767	3.4	5.0	1.8	.5	9.5

== See also ==
- List of All-Atlantic Coast Conference men's basketball teams
