= Buzzy Wilkinson =

American basketball player

Personal information
- Born: November 18, 1932 Pineville, West Virginia
- Died: January 15, 2016 (aged 83) Myrtle Beach, South Carolina
- Listed height: 6 ft 2 in (1.88 m)

Career information
- High school: Greenbrier Military School (Lewisburg, West Virginia); Pineville High School
- College: Virginia (1952–1955)
- NBA draft: 1955: 3rd round, 30th overall pick
- Drafted by: Boston Celtics
- Position: Guard / forward

Career highlights
- Third-team All-American – AP (1955); 2× First-team All-ACC (1954, 1955); No. 14 retired by Virginia Cavaliers
- Stats at Basketball Reference

Richard Warren "Buzzy" Wilkinson (November 18, 1932 – January 15, 2016) was an American basketball player who was selected by the Boston Celtics in the third round (30th pick overall) of the 1955 NBA draft but never played in the NBA. A 6'2" guard-forward from the University of Virginia and a prolific scorer, he averaged 32.1 points per game in his senior season of 1954–55, and totaled 2,233 points during his college career. His number 14 was the first number retired in Virginia Cavaliers basketball history.

Named after a comic-strip character by his grandmother Wilkinson's 1954–55 season scoring average is the Atlantic Coast Conference (ACC) all-time record, as is his career average of 28.6 points per game. He was the ACC's leading scorer during each of the conference's first two years in existence. Wilkinson holds almost all of the ACC records for field goal attempts: most FG attempts in a game (44 vs. Duke, 1954); most FG attempts in a season (767, 1954); most FG attempts per game, season (28.4, 1954); and most FG attempts per game, career (27.4).

== Post-playing career ==
He was the president and CEO of First Century Bank based out of Bluefield, West Virginia. Wilkinson died on January 15, 2016, at the age of 83.
