= 2002–03 Atlantic Coast Conference men's basketball season =

The 2002-03 Atlantic Coast Conference (ACC) men's basketball season was won by Wake Forest, led by their coach Skip Prosser. Maryland Terrapins finished in second place, and defending champions Duke Blue Devils in third. Previously top-ranking teams such as North Carolina and Virginia came further down the table. The ACC tournament was won by Duke Blue Devils. The ACC also sent four teams to the NCAA tournament, which was won by Syracuse University, led by All-World Freshman Carmelo Anthony.

== Final standings ==
Rank	School	W	L	Win %
1	Wake Forest	13	3	.813
2	Maryland	11	5	.688
3	Duke	11	5	.688
4	NC State	9	7	.563
5	Georgia Tech	7	9	.438
6	Virginia	6	10	.275
7	North Carolina	6	10	.275
8	Clemson	5	11	.313
9	Florida State	4	12	.250

== ACC tournament ==
See 2003 ACC men's basketball tournament

== Postseason ==
=== NCAA tournament ===
ACC Record: 5–4

2 Wake Forest (1–1)

W 15 East Tennessee State 76-73
L 10 Auburn 62-68

3 Duke (2–1) - Sweet Sixteen

W 14 Colorado State 67-57
W 11 Central Michigan 86-60
L 2 Kansas 65-69

6 Maryland (2–1) - Sweet Sixteen

W 11 UNC-Wilmington 75-73
W 3 Xavier 77-64
L 7 Michigan St 58-60

9 NC State (0–1)

L 8 California 74-76(OT)

=== NIT ===
ACC Record: 5–3

North Carolina (2–1)

W DePaul 83–72
W Wyoming 90-74
L Georgetown 74-79

Georgia Tech (2-1)

W Ohio State 72-58
W Iowa 79-78
L Texas Tech 72-80

Virginia (1–1)

W Brown 89–73
L St. John's 63-73
