= Wichita State Shockers men's basketball statistical leaders =

The Wichita State Shockers men's basketball statistical leaders are individual statistical leaders of the Wichita State Shockers men's basketball program in various categories, including points, assists, blocks, rebounds, and steals. Within those areas, the lists identify single-game, single-season, and career leaders. The Shockers represent Wichita State University in the NCAA's American Athletic Conference.

Wichita State began competing in intercollegiate basketball in 1905. However, the school's record book does not generally list records from before the 1950s, as records from before this period are often incomplete and inconsistent. Since scoring was much lower in this era, and teams played much fewer games during a typical season, it is likely that few or no players from this era would appear on these lists anyway.

The NCAA did not officially record assists as a stat until the 1983–84 season, and blocks and steals until the 1985–86 season, but Wichita State's record books includes players in these stats before these seasons. These lists are updated through the end of the 2020–21 season.

== Scoring ==
Career
Rk	Player	Points	Seasons
1	Cleo Littleton	2,164	1951–52 1952–53 1953–54 1954–55
2	Xavier McDaniel	2,152	1981–82 1982–83 1983–84 1984–85
3	Dave Stallworth	1,936	1961–62 1962–63 1963–64 1964–65
4	Antoine Carr	1,911	1979–80 1980–81 1981–82 1982–83
5	Lynbert Johnson	1,907	1975–76 1976–77 1977–78 1978–79
6	Jason Perez	1,839	1996–97 1997–98 1998–99 1999–00
7	Aubrey Sherrod	1,765	1981–82 1982–83 1983–84 1984–85
8	Ron Baker	1,636	2012–13 2013–14 2014–15 2015–16
9	Randy Burns	1,599	2001–02 2002–03 2003–04 2004–05
10	Jamar Howard	1,571	2001–02 2002–03 2003–04 2004–05

Season
Rk	Player	Points	Season
1	Xavier McDaniel	844	1984–85
2	Dave Stallworth	769	1963–64
3	Kenyon Giles	689	2025–26
4	Markis McDuffie	672	2018–19
5	Maurice Evans	632	1998–99
6	Xavier McDaniel	619	1983–84
7	Cliff Levingston	612	1980–81
8	Dave Stallworth	609	1962–63
9	Lynbert Johnson	600	1978–79
10	Jamie Thompson	595	1965–66

Single game
Rk	Player	Points	Season	Opponent
1	Antoine Carr	47	1982–83	Southern Illinois
2	Dave Stallworth	46	1962–63	Cincinnati
3	Dave Stallworth	45	1964–65	Loyola Chicago
	Ron Harris	45	1971–72	Southern Illinois
5	Xavier McDaniel	44	1984–85	W. Texas A&M
6	Dave Stallworth	43	1963–64	Arizona St.
	Xavier McDaniel	43	1984–85	Bradley
8	Al Tate	40	1959–60	Tulsa
	Dave Stallworth	40	1964–65	Louisville

== Rebounds ==
Career
Rk	Player	Rebounds	Seasons
1	Xavier McDaniel	1,359	1981–82 1982–83 1983–84 1984–85
2	Robert Elmore	1,039	1973–74 1974–75 1975–76 1976–77
3	Lynbert Johnson	1,027	1975–76 1976–77 1977–78 1978–79
4	Cliff Levingston	965	1979–80 1980–81 1981–82
5	Terry Benton	963	1969–70 1970–71 1971–72
6	Cleo Littleton	878	1951–52 1952–53 1953–54 1954–55
7	Warren Armstrong	839	1965–66 1966–67 1967–68
8	Dave Stallworth	838	1961–62 1962–63 1963–64 1964–65
9	Antoine Carr	776	1979–80 1980–81 1981–82 1982–83
10	Al Tate	774	1957–58 1958–59 1959–60

Season
Rk	Player	Rebounds	Season
1	Xavier McDaniel	460	1984–85
2	Robert Elmore	441	1976–77
3	Terry Benton	437	1970–71
4	Xavier McDaniel	403	1982–83
5	Xavier McDaniel	393	1983–84
6	Cliff Levingston	376	1980–81
7	Terry Benton	364	1971–72
8	Warren Armstrong	323	1965–66
9	Gene Wiley	302	1960–61
	Robert Elmore	302	1974–75
	Quincy Ballard	302	2024–25

Single game
Rk	Player	Rebounds	Season	Opponent
1	Terry Benton	29	1970–71	North Texas
2	Terry Benton	28	1970–71	Loyola
3	Gene Wiley	26	1961–62	Bradley
	Larry Callis	26	1995–96	Drake
5	Robert Elmore	25	1976–77	N. Mexico St.
6	Dave Stallworth	24	1963–64	Creighton
	Gene Wiley	24	1961–62	Tulsa
	Terry Benton	24	1970–71	Memphis
	Terry Benton	24	1970–71	Bradley
	Terry Benton	24	1971–72	W. Texas St.
	Warren Armstrong	24	1965–66	New York U.
	Xavier McDaniel	24	1983–84	W. Texas A&M
	Xavier McDaniel	24	1983–84	Illinois St.

== Assists ==
Career
Rk	Player	Assists	Seasons
1	Fred VanVleet	637	2012–13 2013–14 2014–15 2015–16
2	Toure' Murry	430	2008–09 2009–10 2010–11 2011–12
3	Warren Armstrong	429	1965–66 1966–67 1967–68
4	Bob Trogele	420	1975–76 1976–77 1977–78 1978–79
5	Calvin Bruton	404	1972–73 1973–74 1974–75 1975–76
6	Dave Stallworth	394	1961–62 1962–63 1963–64 1964–65
7	Aubrey Sherrod	384	1981–82 1982–83 1983–84 1984–85
8	Paul Guffrovich	383	1987–88 1988–89 1989–90 1990–91
9	Ron Baker	345	2012–13 2013–14 2014–15 2015–16
10	Tony Martin	336	1980–81 1981–82

Season
Rk	Player	Assists	Season
1	Warren Armstrong	194	1967–68
2	Fred VanVleet	193	2013–14
3	Tony Martin	184	1980–81
4	Fred VanVleet	183	2014–15
5	Joe Griffin	181	1987–88
6	Fred VanVleet	172	2015–16
7	Fridge Holman	169	2003–04
8	Melvin McKey	167	1995–96
9	Landry Shamet	166	2017–18
10	Randy Smithson	163	1980–81

Single game
Rk	Player	Assists	Season	Opponent
1	Joe Griffin	16	1987–88	Oral Roberts
2	Warren Armstrong	14	1967–68	Bradley
3	Mike Edgar	13	1974–75	Drake
	Bob Trogele	13	1977–78	DePaul
5	Warren Armstrong	12	1967–68	Arizona St.
	Warren Armstrong	12	1967–68	Loyola
	Calvin Bruton	12	1972–73	Saint Louis
	Mike Edgar	12	1974–75	Tulsa
	Calvin Bruton	12	1975–76	Memphis
	Tony Martin	12	1981–82	West Texas St.
	Robert George	12	1990–91	Drake
	Alterique Gilbert	12	2020–21	Tulane

== Steals ==
Career
Rk	Player	Steals	Seasons
1	Fred VanVleet	225	2012–13 2013–14 2014–15 2015–16
2	Jason Perez	222	1996–97 1997–98 1998–99 1999–00
3	Toure' Murry	180	2008–09 2009–10 2010–11 2011–12
4	Ron Baker	163	2012–13 2013–14 2014–15 2015–16
5	Tekele Cotton	156	2011–12 2012–13 2013–14 2014–15
6	Jamar Howard	153	2001–02 2002–03 2003–04 2004–05
7	Aubrey Sherrod	148	1981–82 1982–83 1983–84 1984–85
	PJ Couisnard	148	2004–05 2005–06 2006–07 2007–08
9	Lynbert Johnson	126	1975–76 1976–77 1977–78 1978–79
10	Robert George	120	1990–91 1991–92

Season
Rk	Player	Steals	Season
1	Malcolm Armstead	76	2012–13
2	Fred VanVleet	69	2013–14
3	Jason Perez	67	1999–00
4	Fred VanVleet	66	2014–15
5	Robert George	63	1990–91
6	Jason Perez	62	1997–98
7	Kenyon Giles	59	2025–26
8	Preston Carrington	57	1970–71
	Robert George	57	1991–92
10	Jason Perez	55	1998–99
	Fred VanVleet	55	2015–16

Single game
Rk	Player	Steals	Season	Opponent
1	Ernie Moore	7	1962–63	Drake
	Lynbert Johnson	7	1978–79	So. Dakota
	Robert George	7	1991–92	Bradley
	Tekele Cotton	7	2013–14	Drake
	Fred VanVleet	7	2014–15	N. Mexico St.
	Craig Porter	7	2021–22	Memphis
7	Dave Stallworth	6	1963–64	Montana St.
	Steve Webster	6	1970–71	Drake
	Cheese Johnson	6	1977–78	Creighton
	Ray Shirley	6	1977–78	Indiana St.
	Lawrence Howell	6	1977–78	Bradley
	Bob Trogele	6	1978–79	Tulsa
	Tony Martin	6	1981–82	US International
	Xavier McDaniel	6	1984–85	Neb.-Omaha
	Lew Hill	6	1985–86	New Orleans
	Robert George	6	1990–91	Drake
	K.C. Hunt	6	1991–92	So. Illinois
	Jimmy Bolden	6	1992–93	Florida
	Ron Baker	6	2015–16	Loyola Chicago

== Blocks ==
Career
Rk	Player	Blocks	Seasons
1	Antoine Carr	209	1979–80 1980–81 1981–82 1982–83
2	Quincy Ballard	152	2022–23 2023–24 2024–25
3	Shaquille Morris	147	2014–15 2015–16 2016–17 2017–18
4	Robert Elmore	132	1973–74 1974–75 1975–76 1976–77
5	Claudius Johnson	109	1989–90 1990–91 1991–92 1992–93
6	Gene Wiley	105	1959–60 1960–61 1961–62
7	Xavier McDaniel	103	1981–82 1982–83 1983–84 1984–85
8	Garrett Stutz	101	2008–09 2009–10 2010–11 2011–12
9	PJ Couisnard	98	2004–05 2005–06 2006–07 2007–08
10	Ehimen Orukpe	94	2010–11 2011–12 2012–13
	Jaime Echenique	94	2018–19 2019–20

Season
Rk	Player	Blocks	Season
1	Gene Wiley	80	1961–62
2	Quincy Ballard	74	2023–24
3	Robert Elmore	69	1976–77
4	Antoine Carr	65	1980–81
5	Quincy Ballard	64	2024–25
6	Robert Elmore	56	1974–75
	Ehimen Orukpe	56	2012–13
8	Carl Hall	55	2012–13
	Terry Benton	55	1970–71
10	Antoine Carr	54	1981–82

Single game
Rk	Player	Blocks	Season	Opponent
1	Gene Wiley	15	1961–62	Purdue
2	Gene Wiley	12	1961–62	Louisville
	Gene Wiley	12	1961–62	Santa Clara
4	Gene Wiley	11	1961–62	Drake
5	Gene Wiley	10	1961–62	Tulsa
6	Ehimen Orukpe	9	2012–13	So. Illinois
	Gene Wiley	9	1960–61	Houston
	Robert Elmore	9	1976–77	Bradley
9	Antoine Carr	7	1980–81	W. Texas A&M
	Gene Wiley	7	1961–62	Bowling Green
	Terry Benton	7	1970–71	Kansas St.
	Quincy Ballard	7	2023–24	Norfolk State
	Quincy Ballard	7	2023–24	East Carolina
