= Steve Mitchell (basketball, born 1951) =

American basketball player

Personal information
- Born: April 17, 1951 Oklahoma City, Oklahoma, U.S.
- Died: December 5, 1978 (aged 27) Pesaro, Italy
- Listed height: 6 ft 10 in (2.08 m)
- Listed weight: 250 lb (113 kg)

Career information
- High school: Northwest Classen (Oklahoma City, Oklahoma)
- College: Kansas State (1970–1973)
- NBA draft: 1973: 3rd round, 43rd overall pick
- Drafted by: Phoenix Suns
- Playing career: 1973–1978
- Position: Forward

Career history
- 1973–1974: EBBC Den Bosch
- 1978: Sarila Rimini

Career highlights
- Big Eight Sophomore of the Year (1971)
- Stats at Basketball Reference

Stephen M. Mitchell (April 17, 1951 – December 5, 1978) was an American professional basketball player. He played college basketball for the Kansas State Wildcats from 1970 to 1973. Mitchell began his professional career in Holland during the 1973–74 season and then spent the next four years playing in Italy. He died of heart failure during his first season with Sarila Rimini in 1978.

== Early life ==
Mitchell attended Northwest Classen High School in Oklahoma City, Oklahoma. He led the basketball team to the Class 3A state championship as a junior in 1968. Mitchell averaged 21.5 points and 15.6 rebounds as a senior. He was the highest scoring player in Northwest history and totalled 1,405 points in three seasons.

On April 21, 1969, Mitchell signed a letter of intent to play college basketball for the Kansas State Wildcats. Mitchell led the Wildcats in scoring and was third in rebounding during his sophomore season in 1970–71. He was selected as the Big Eight Conference Sophomore of the Year in 1971.

== Professional career ==
Mitchell was selected by the Phoenix Suns in the third round of the 1973 NBA draft and the Denver Rockets in the second round of the 1973 ABA draft. He was offered a one-year no-cut contract by the Rockets but decided to wait for the Suns to make their own offer. In October 1973, Mitchell realised that the Suns would not contact him and he accepted an offer to play for EBBC Den Bosch in Holland during the 1973–74 season. He averaged 25 points per game.

Mitchell played in Italy for four years where he was ranked as one of the top American players in the country. He loved Italy and would stay back a month after his season ended. He joined Sarila Rimini in 1978.

== Death ==
On December 4, 1978, Mitchell and his teammate Mark Crow travelled to Pesaro to spend the night with Jim Thomas who played for Scavolini. After drinking wine and beer together, Mitchell fell asleep on a sofa in Thomas' apartment. The next morning, Thomas saw Mitchell was still asleep but decided not to disturb him. When Thomas and two other players returned to the apartment later in the day, they found Mitchell dead. An autopsy showed that Mitchell's heart failed and he had consumed a large quantity of alcohol but the cause of his death was inconclusive.

Mitchell was one of three American basketball players to die in Europe during a 13-month span alongside Robert Elmore in Italy and Fessor Leonard in Switzerland.

== See also ==
- List of basketball players who died during their careers
