= Fessor Leonard =

American basketball player (1953–1978)

Personal information
- Born: June 19, 1953 Columbus, Georgia, U.S.
- Died: February 20, 1978 (aged 24) Lugano, Switzerland
- Listed height: 7 ft 1 in (2.16 m)
- Listed weight: 220 lb (100 kg)

Career information
- High school: Carver (Columbus, Georgia)
- College: Furman (1972–1975)
- NBA draft: 1975: 4th round, 71st overall pick
- Drafted by: Washington Bullets
- Playing career: 1975–1978
- Position: Center

Career history
- 1975–1977: Fortitudo Bologna
- 1977–1978: Federale Lugano

Career highlights
- 3× First-team All-SoCon (1973–1975); Fourth-team Parade All-American (1971)
- Stats at Basketball Reference

Fessor Lee Leonard (June 19, 1953 – February 20, 1978) was an American professional basketball player. Nicknamed "Moose", he was a highly sought-after prospect while playing at Carver High School in his hometown of Columbus, Georgia, and was selected as a Parade All-American in 1971. Leonard played college basketball for the Furman Paladins where he was an all-Southern Conference selection and won the conference championship all three years he played. He was selected in the 1975 NBA draft by the Washington Bullets and 1975 ABA draft by the Virginia Squires but difficulties with his agent meant that he was never offered a contract by either team. Leonard instead played professionally for Fortitudo Bologna in Italy and Federale Lugano in Switzerland. He died in Switzerland days after being released by Federale Lugano midway through his first season with the team.

== Early life ==
Leonard was born on June 19, 1953, in Columbus, Georgia, to Fessor Leonard Sr. and Betty Ann Mitchell. He had two brothers and a sister. Leonard was nicknamed "Moose".

Leonard attended Carver High School in Columbus. He averaged 22.8 points and 18 rebounds per game during his senior season. Carver won the triple-A championship and Leonard was selected to the Parade All-American fourth-team in 1971.

Leonard was described as the most sought-after player in Georgia during his collegiate recruitment. He was encouraged by Artis Gilmore to play for head coach Joe Williams and the Furman Paladins. On April 14, 1971, Leonard signed a grant-in-aid with Furman. He selected Furman over the Wisconsin Badgers and Jacksonville Dolphins.

== College career ==
Leonard was a three-year starter for the Furman Paladins and helped them to three Southern Conference (SoCon) titles. He was an All-SoCon selection for the three years he played.

Leonard played alongside Clyde Mayes throughout his collegiate career and was considered to often be in the shadow of Mayes. Williams implemented a team-play concept for the Paladins which saw both players sacrifice individual scoring and rebound figures for the team. Leonard felt like he never reached his full potential while playing for the Paladins. He was initially expected to be selected in the later rounds of the 1975 NBA draft but improved his draft stock with promising performances at two pre-draft camps.

== Professional career ==
Leonard was selected in the fourth rounds of the 1975 NBA draft by the Washington Bullets and 1975 ABA draft by the Virginia Squires. He played in a Venezuelan summer league for six weeks during June and July which was intended to help him negotiate better with either team. In August, Leonard revealed that he had not heard from either the Bullets or the Squires after the draft; this was disputed by Bob Ferry, the general manager of the Bullets, who claimed that the team had mailed him a contract but had not heard back from him or his agent. The Bullets claimed that once they did make contact, Leonard and his agent, Irwin Weiner, demanded a no-cut contract which the Bullets refused. The Squires were unable to ever get in contact with him. Leonard claimed that he never heard from either team. Leonard ultimately left Weiner as his agent.

Leonard signed with Fortitudo Bologna of the Italian Serie A1 for the 1975–76 season. He averaged 24 points and 17 rebounds per game. Leonard returned to Bologna for the 1976–77 season. He was invited to training camp with the New Jersey Nets in 1977. Bill Melchionni, an assistant with the Nets, explained that the team did not know much about Leonard but invited him so they could have a look.

Leonard moved to Federale Lugano of Switzerland for the 1977–78 season. On Christmas Eve 1977, he was walking down a street in Lugano when he saw an elderly woman who he thought needed assistance. According to various accounts, the woman was so frightened by Leonard that she either screamed, pushed him away or did both. Leonard was arrested by the police who alleged that he had beaten the woman; the criminal complaint was dropped but he suffered from nervous depression after the incident. Leonard was attacked in the local press and was so bothered by the criticism that he clipped the stories from newspapers. Club officials at Federale Lugano claimed that the incident affected his play and made the decision to release him from his contract. Leonard booked his flight to return to the United States on February 22, 1978.

== Death ==
On February 20, 1978, Leonard was found dead in his apartment in Lugano by a teammate. A police statement said that Leonard started several fires in his room before he went to sleep on February 18. The room was tightly closed and the flames would have consumed enough oxygen to cause suffocation. The two wire services covering his death conflicted in their reports: United Press International described it as an apparent suicide while the Associated Press considered it an accident. His family believed that he committed suicide. An autopsy found that Leonard died of carbon monoxide poisoning with no trace of prescription or narcotic drugs in his system.

Leonard was one of three American basketball players to die in Europe during a 13-month span alongside Robert Elmore and Steve Mitchell in Italy.

Leonard was buried in Green Acres Cemetery in Columbus.

== Personal life ==
Leonard graduated from Furman with a B.S. in political science. His half-brother, Sam Mitchell, was also a professional basketball player who played in Europe and the NBA.

== See also ==
- List of basketball players who died during their careers
