= Ron Baker (basketball) =

American basketball player (born 1993)

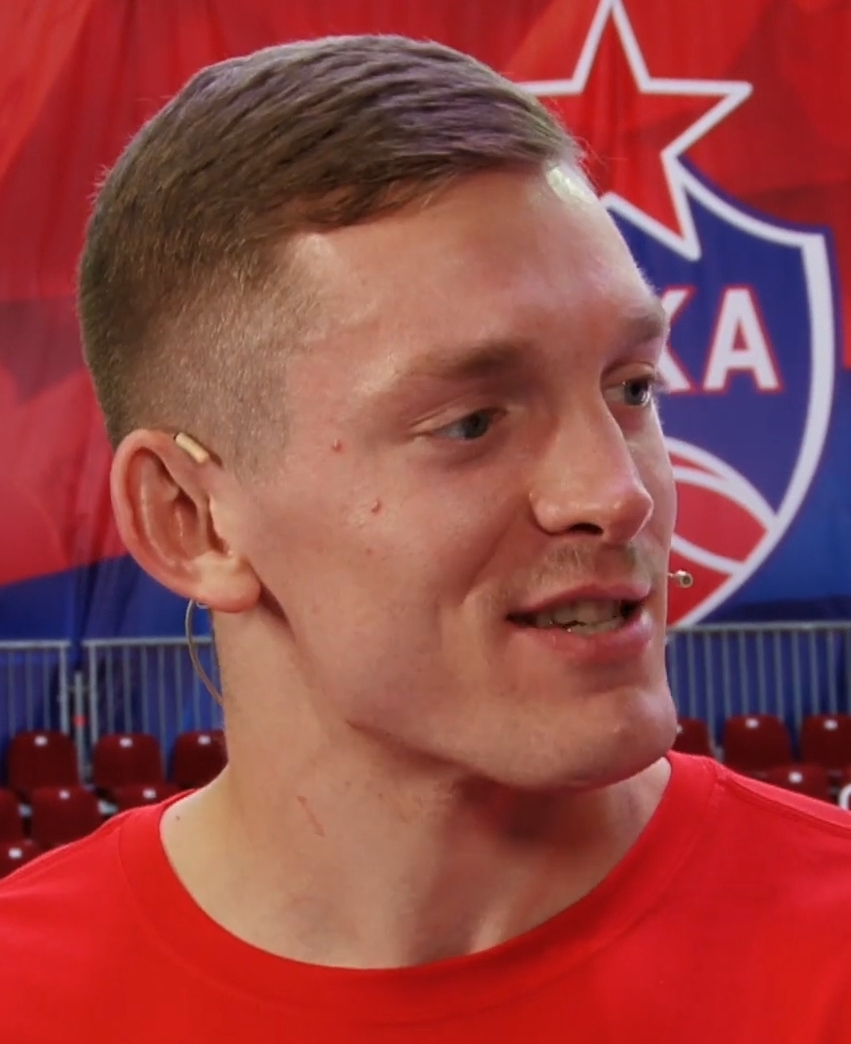
- Baker in 2019

Personal information
- Born: March 30, 1993 (age 33) Hays, Kansas, U.S.
- Listed height: 6 ft 4 in (1.93 m)
- Listed weight: 220 lb (100 kg)

Career information
- High school: Scott City (Scott City, Kansas)
- College: Wichita State (2012–2016)
- NBA draft: 2016: undrafted
- Playing career: 2016–2020
- Position: Shooting guard / point guard
- Number: 31, 84

Career history
- 2016–2018: New York Knicks
- 2016–2017: →Westchester Knicks
- 2018–2019: Washington Wizards
- 2019–2020: CSKA Moscow

Career highlights
- 3× First-team All-MVC (2014–2016); AP honorable mention All-American (2015)
- Stats at NBA.com
- Stats at Basketball Reference
Medals
Representing the United States
Pan American Games
Bronze medal – third place	2015 Toronto	National team

Ronald Delaine Baker (born March 30, 1993) is an American former professional basketball player. He played college basketball for the Wichita State Shockers. Going undrafted in the 2016 NBA draft, he spent 3 seasons in the NBA, playing for the New York Knicks and Washington Wizards.

== Early life ==
Born in Hays, Kansas, Baker spent his early childhood in the small farming town of Utica, Kansas, growing up with one sister and one brother. In a 2014 interview, he recalled, "I have memories of when was I very, very little, holding a basketball in my dog's doghouse when I was about 1." His father noted that he eventually gravitated toward basketball for practical reasons: "It was easier to haul him around and easier to get five or six to play basketball than to play baseball, where you'd need 12 to 14."

== High school career ==
While he developed into a star at Scott Community High, and dreamed of playing for the state's premier college program at Kansas, he was slow to grow into his body; by the end of his junior year, he was only 6 feet (1.8 m) tall, and had drawn interest from only two Division I programs: Arkansas–Little Rock and South Dakota State. However, he grew to 6 ft 3 in (1.91 m) during the summer between his junior and senior seasons.

In his senior year, Baker helped the team finish with a 25–1 record. In return, he was named 3A First-Team All-State in Kansas. The peak of his high school basketball career was when he hit a game winning put-back buzzer beater against Minneapolis High School to win the Class 3A state basketball championship, finishing the game with 26 points and 9 rebounds. As a result, Baker helped the school win its first ever Class 3A Championship, although the school had made two different appearances in the past.

Nonetheless, Baker remained little-known among Division I coaches. ESPN.com writer Eamonn Brennan noted in 2014,

ESPN's Recruiting Nation maintains detailed scouting reports on hundreds of the best high school basketball players in the country. . . . Ron Baker's profile read as follows:

"Will walk-on at Wichita State in 2011–12 and spend a redshirt year. Expected to be on scholarship starting in 2012–13."

And that was it. Next to Baker's name was "NR," which stands for "Not Ranked." The same abbreviation sits next to secondary lists for "position," "regional" and "state." Baker — who requested a redshirt year when he committed, as a walk-on, to Wichita State in April 2011 — couldn't have been more off the recruiting radar.

After his senior season, Kansas invited him to visit the campus. Baker had thoughts about walking on there, but the invitation occurred during the middle of his high school baseball season. Baker's father recalled that Ron felt that his basketball game was rusty, and that "he didn't want to embarrass himself" in a potential scrimmage.

== College career ==
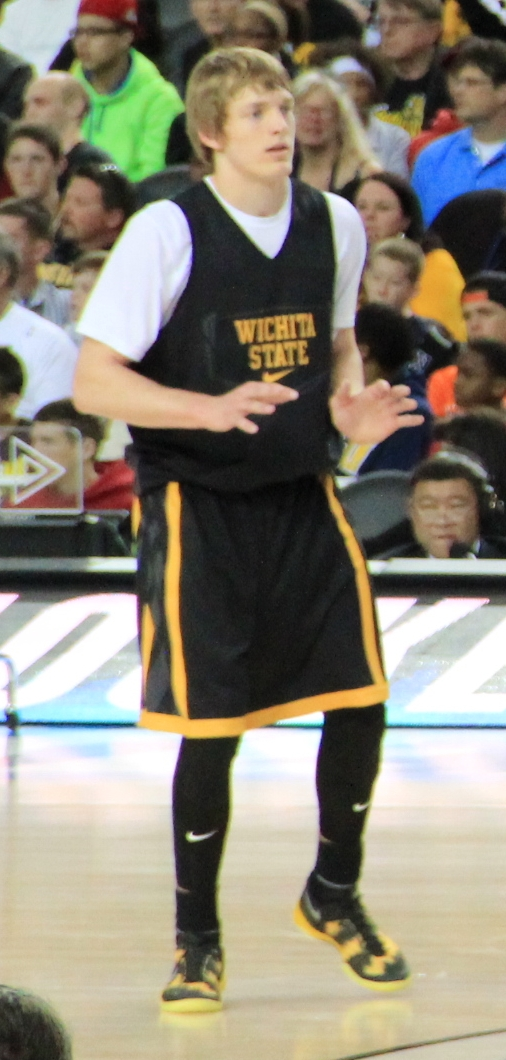
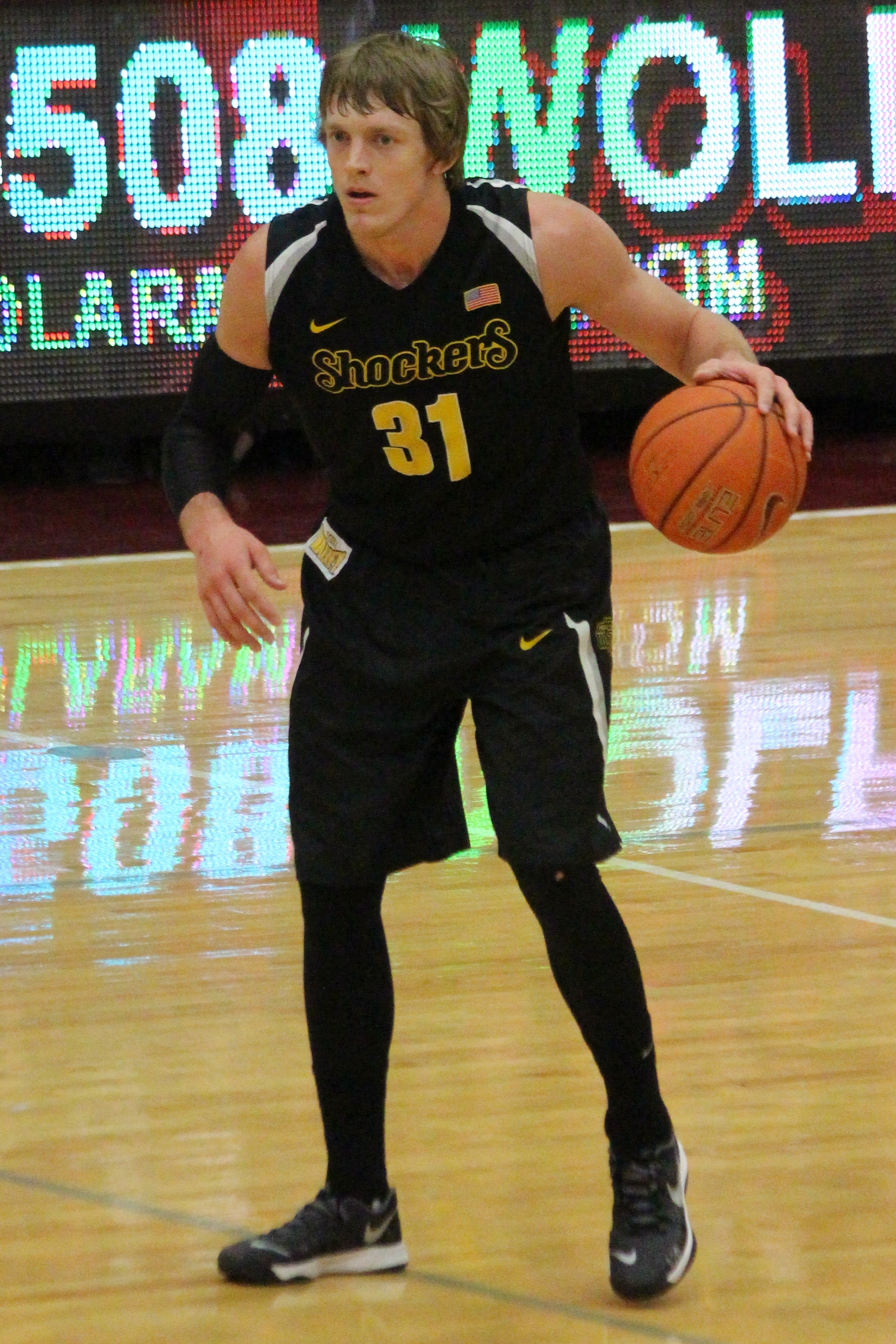
Baker as a redshirt freshman for the 2012–13 Wichita State Shockers (left) and 4th-year junior for the 2014–15 team (right)

Baker chose to play for the Wichita State Shockers after also having interest in Arkansas–Little Rock, Eastern Illinois, and South Dakota State. Rather than playing in his first season with the Shockers, Baker redshirted after a reluctant approval from head coach Gregg Marshall.

In his first season, Baker emerged as one of the elite free-throw shooters at Wichita State. He finished the season shooting for a free-throw percentage of .822, the highest for a qualified player on the team. Baker did not prove himself to be an efficient scorer and played just eighteen games in the entire season due to a stress fracture in his left foot. He eventually played a major role when the Shockers made an unanticipated run into the semifinals of the 2013 NCAA Men's Division I Basketball Tournament. Baker shot 40 percent from the field, 42.9 percent on three-pointers, most notably scoring 16 points in a huge win over No. 1 Gonzaga (tied for team-high). He earned no major awards by the time the season came to a close.

Entering the 2013–14 NCAA Division I men's basketball season, Baker became known as one of the MVC's premier shooters. He, Cleanthony Early, and Fred VanVleet led the team in scoring and had a major influence on Wichita State's season, which saw the Shockers become the first NCAA Division I men's team to enter the NCAA tournament undefeated in over 20 years. Baker was named to the 2014 MVC All-Conference First Team and the CBE Hall of Fame Classic's Most Valuable Player after finishing his first season with a double-digit scoring average. After the Shockers' season ended in the NCAA tournament at the hands of Kentucky and its highly touted freshman class, Baker indicated that one of the Wildcats' top recruits, Aaron Harrison, told him, "You are a bad, bad, bad boy."

He was a part of three Missouri Valley Conference championships (2013, 2014, 2015), nine NCAA Tournament wins, two trips to the Sweet 16 (2013, 2015) and a trip to the 2013 Final Four. As a senior in 2015–16, he averaged 14.0 points, 4.8 rebounds, 3.2 assists, and 1.51 steals over 31.6 minutes in 35 games. His postseason honors included: John R. Wooden Second Team All-American; USA Today Second Team All-American and 2015 finalist for Jerry West Award. Baker also represented the United States at the 2015 Pan American Games, where he started all five games and won a bronze medal.

== Professional career ==
=== New York Knicks (2016–2018) ===
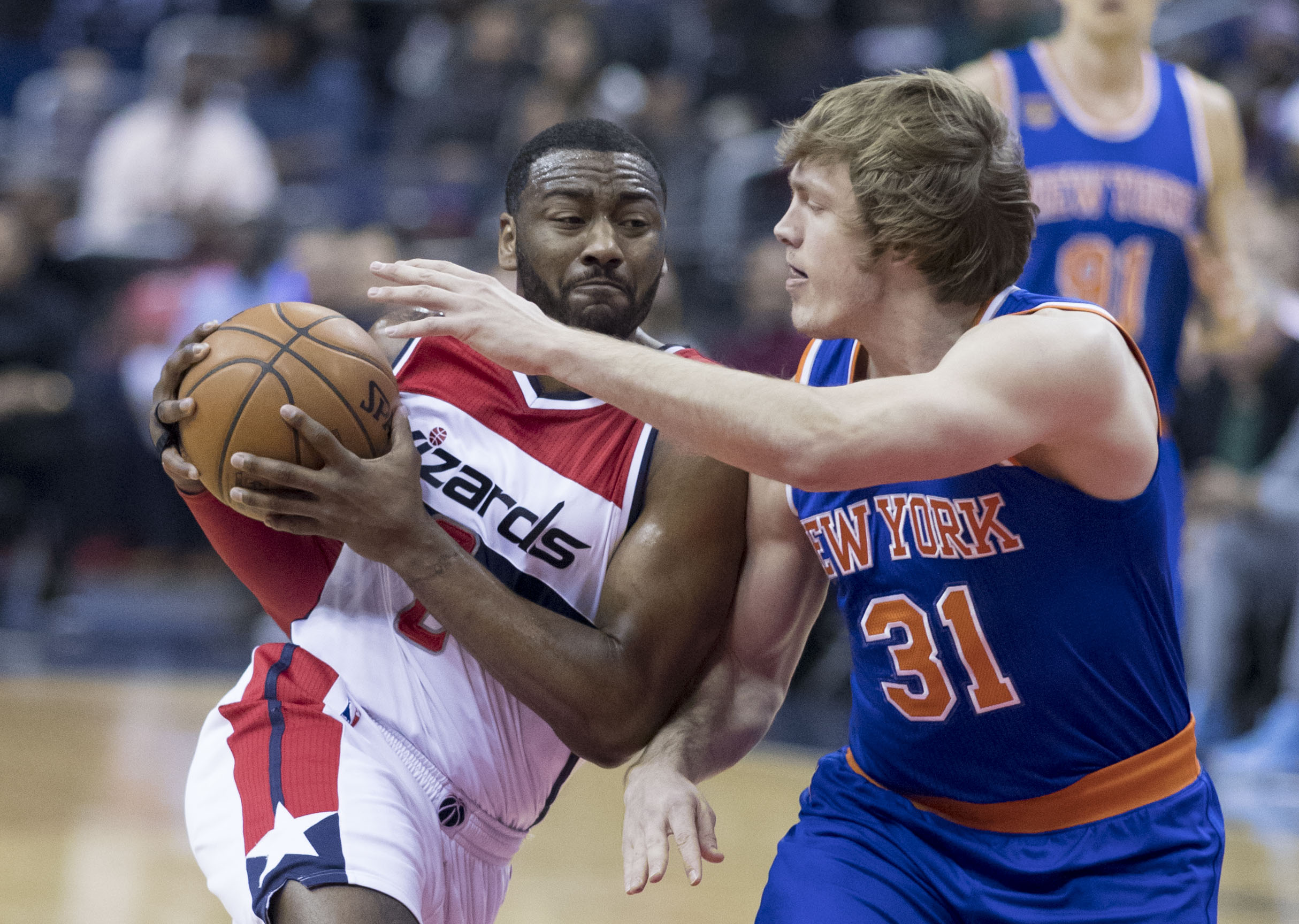
Baker guards John Wall of the Washington Wizards in 2017

After going undrafted in the 2016 NBA draft, Baker joined the New York Knicks for the 2016 NBA Summer League. Despite a scattered Summer League campaign, Baker signed with the Knicks on August 1, 2016, and secured an opening-night roster spot. He made his debut for the Knicks in their season opener on October 25, 2016, recording five points and one rebound in seven minutes off the bench in a 117–88 loss to the Cleveland Cavaliers. On December 15, 2016, he scored a career-high 13 points in a 103–90 loss to the Golden State Warriors. On January 16, 2017, he made his first career start for the Knicks and subsequently scored 12 points in a 108–107 loss to the Atlanta Hawks. During his rookie and sophomore seasons, in which he became a fan favorite, he was assigned multiple times to New York's D-League/G League affiliate, the Westchester Knicks.

On August 7, 2017, Baker re-signed with the Knicks. Baker missed the Knicks' game on January 2, 2018, against the San Antonio Spurs because of a broken left orbital bone sustained when he was hit in the face trying to stop Anthony Davis' drive to the basket in New York's victory against the New Orleans Pelicans on December 30. On February 5, 2018, he was ruled out for the rest of the season after it was determined he required right shoulder surgery. Baker was waived by the Knicks on December 13, 2018.

=== Washington Wizards (2018–2019) ===
On December 20, 2018, Baker signed with the Washington Wizards. He was waived on January 7, 2019, after appearing in four games.

=== CSKA Moscow (2019–2020) ===
On August 1, 2019, he signed a contract with CSKA Moscow of the VTB United League and the EuroLeague. Baker averaged 2.5 points per game in 27 EuroLeague games. On May 27, 2020, he parted ways with the team.

== National team career ==
Baker represented the United States national team at the 2015 Pan American Games, where he won a bronze medal.

== Retirement ==
In a May 2021 episode of Inside TBT, the official podcast of The Basketball Tournament, Baker indicated that he had retired from play. He told the hosts that he had undergone hip surgery while overseas, and wanted to move on with his life, with hopes of entering the business world. He is serving as general manager of AfterShocks, a TBT team made up mostly of Wichita State basketball alumni, in the 2021 TBT. Baker also emphasized that he would not play in this or any future edition of TBT.

In August 2021, Baker was named project manager in the strategy and business development department at a medical center-Ascension Via Christi, in Wichita, Kansas.

== Career statistics ==
Legend
GP	Games played	GS	Games started	MPG	Minutes per game
FG%	Field goal percentage	3P%	3-point field goal percentage	FT%	Free throw percentage
RPG	Rebounds per game	APG	Assists per game	SPG	Steals per game
BPG	Blocks per game	PPG	Points per game	**Bold**	Career high

=== NBA ===
==== Regular season ====
Year	Team	GP	GS	MPG	FG%	3P%	FT%	RPG	APG	SPG	BPG	PPG
2016–17	New York	**52**	**13**	**16.5**	**.378**	.267	.651	**1.9**	**2.1**	.7	.2	**4.1**
2017–18	New York	29	1	13.3	.339	**.333**	.769	1.0	1.6	**.9**	.2	2.4
2018–19	New York	11	0	9.7	.250	.111	**.833**	.6	1.2	.5	.0	1.3
2018–19	Washington	4	0	11.3	.000	.000	–	1.0	.5	.3	**.3**	.0
Career		96	14	14.5	.358	.265	.707	1.4	1.8	.7	.2	3.1

=== College ===
Year	Team	GP	GS	MPG	FG%	3P%	FT%	RPG	APG	SPG	BPG	PPG
2012–13	Wichita State	18	15	26.1	.398	.357	.822	3.2	1.8	.8	.3	12.7
2013–14	Wichita State	**36**	**36**	29.9	**.456**	.380	**.842**	3.8	3.1	1.4	.6	13.1
2014–15	Wichita State	35	35	**32.7**	.433	**.383**	.758	4.5	2.5	1.3	**.8**	13.7
2015–16	Wichita State	35	35	31.6	.424	.350	.793	**4.8**	**3.2**	**1.5**	.6	**14.0**
Career		124	121	30.6	.433	.369	.801	4.2	2.8	1.3	.6	13.2

== Personal life ==
Baker is an enrolled member of the Citizen Potawatomi Nation. Following the 2015–16 season, Baker was contacted by the owner of a small publishing house in El Dorado, Kansas, who wanted him to write a children's book. The final product, You're Too Big to Dream Small, is an illustrated book with rhyming text written primarily by Baker himself and based closely on his life. It was released on August 3, 2016, and Baker personally signed the first print run of 6,000 copies.

Ron Baker married Liv Nielsen in 2023. He welcomed his first child, a baby girl, with his wife in February 2024.
