= Cleo Littleton =

American basketball player (1932–2026)

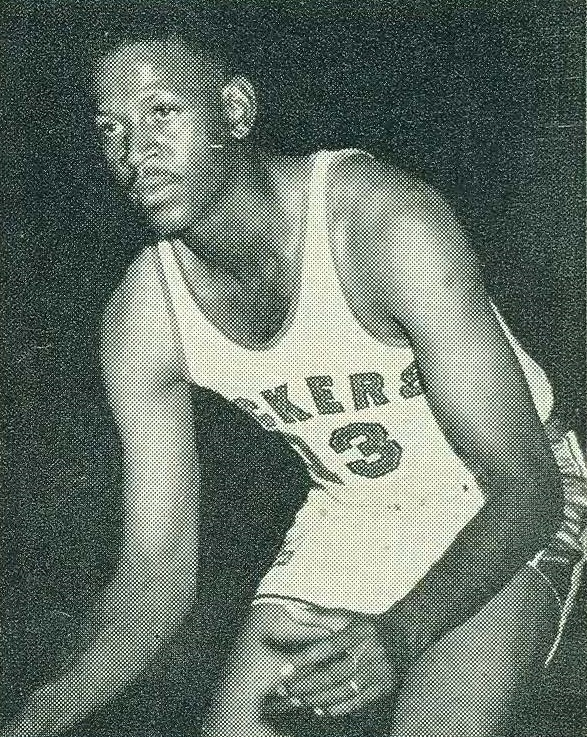
- Littleton with the Wichita Vickers

Personal information
- Born: December 31, 1932 Rentiesville, Oklahoma, U.S.
- Died: May 31, 2026 (aged 93)
- Listed height: 6 ft 3 in (1.91 m)

Career information
- High school: Wichita East (Wichita, Kansas)
- College: Wichita State (1951–1955)
- NBA draft: 1955: 5th round, 38th overall pick
- Drafted by: Fort Wayne Pistons
- Position: Forward

Career highlights
- 2× AP Honorable mention All-American (1954–1955); 4× First-team All-MVC (1952–1955); No. 13 retired by Wichita State Shockers
- Stats at Basketball Reference

Cleophus "Cleo" Littleton (December 31, 1932 – May 31, 2026) was an American college basketball player for the Wichita State Shockers, then known as The Municipal University of Wichita.

== Biography ==
Littleton was the first college basketball player located west of the Mississippi River to score more than 2,000 points in his career and remains the all-time leading scorer in Wichita State basketball history. Littleton's career was also notable in that he was one of the first African-American basketball players to star in the Missouri Valley Conference.

He was drafted by the NBA Fort Wayne Pistons in 1955, but on the advice of coach Ralph Miller, he opted to stay in Wichita, playing with the Vickers AAU team, and beginning his business career. In 1987, he started his own construction company, Litco Inc., which he still managed as of 2000. He was named the 2004 Small Business Administration's (SBA) Graduate of the Year.

Littleton died on May 31, 2026, at the age of 93.
