= Dave Stallworth =

American basketball player (1941–2017)

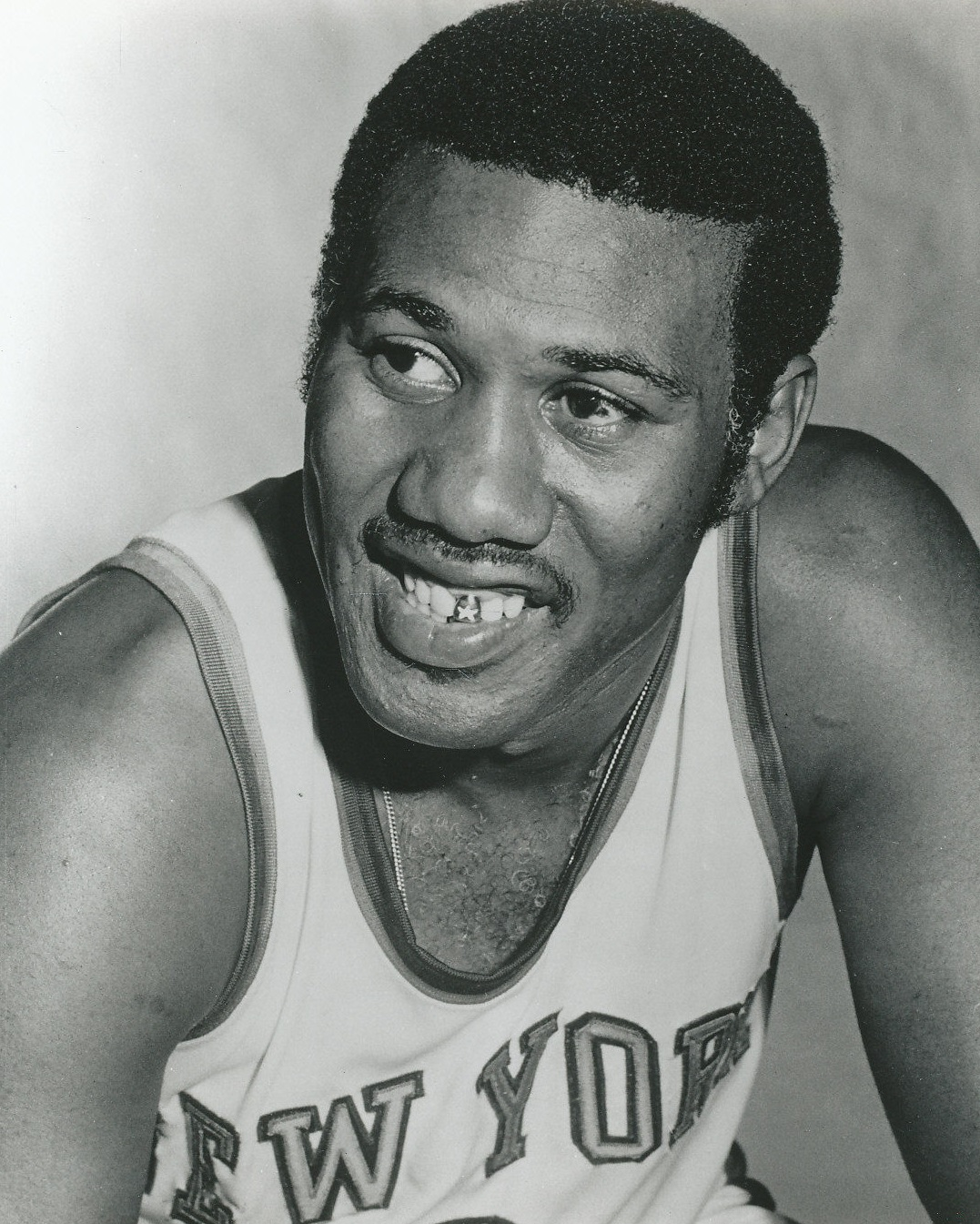
- Stallworth in 1971

Personal information
- Born: December 20, 1941 Dallas, Texas, U.S.
- Died: March 15, 2017 (aged 75) Wichita, Kansas, U.S.
- Listed height: 6 ft 7 in (2.01 m)
- Listed weight: 200 lb (91 kg)

Career information
- High school: James Madison (Dallas, Texas)
- College: Wichita State (1962–1965)
- NBA draft: 1965: 1st round, 3rd overall pick
- Drafted by: New York Knicks
- Playing career: 1965–1974
- Position: Power forward / center
- Number: 9, 42

Career history
- 1965–1972: New York Knicks
- 1972–1974: Baltimore / Capital Bullets
- 1974: New York Knicks

Career highlights
- NBA champion (1970); Consensus first-team All-American (1964); Consensus second-team All-American (1965); 3× First-team All-MVC (1963–1965); No. 42 retired by Wichita State Shockers

Career statistics
- Points: 4,860 (9.3 ppg)
- Rebounds: 2,453 (4.7 rpg)
- Assists: 872 (1.7 apg)
- Stats at NBA.com
- Stats at Basketball Reference

David A. Stallworth (December 20, 1941 – March 15, 2017) was an American professional basketball player. He played in the National Basketball Association (NBA) for eight seasons and was a member of the New York Knicks' 1969–70 championship-winning team.

== College career ==
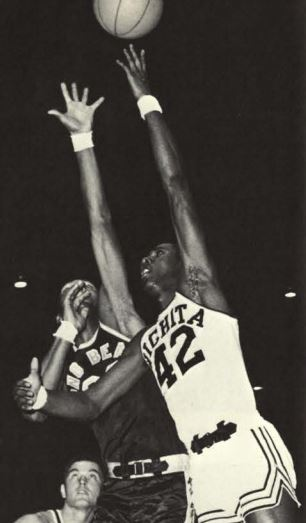
Stallworth at Wichita State.

A 6'7" forward/center from Dallas' Madison High School, Stallworth graduated in 1961 and attended Wichita State University. In his three seasons with the Shockers, he set 18 school records, including the highest career point per game average (24.2). Stallworth helped the team reach the 1964 NCAA Men's Division I Basketball Tournament, the school's first appearance in the NCAA Tournament, and was named to the All-American team twice. He earned the nickname "Dave the Rave" while playing at Wichita State.

== NBA career ==
In the 1965 NBA draft, Stallworth was selected in the first round by the New York Knicks, with the third overall pick.

Stallworth played eight seasons (1965–1967; 1969–1975) in the NBA as a member of the Knicks and Baltimore/Capital Bullets. He averaged 9.3 points per game in his career and won a league championship with New York in 1970.

Stallworth's play for the Knicks in the 1969–70 season came after he had suffered a heart attack in March 1967, during his second season in the NBA; he had posted a scoring average of 12.6 points per game the previous season. Following a period as a coach for a Wichita-based amateur team, Stallworth was told by his doctor that he could return to playing.

A back-up on the 1969–70 Knicks, Stallworth was forced into action in Game 5 of the 1970 NBA Finals after Willis Reed was injured early. He was assigned to cover Los Angeles Lakers star Wilt Chamberlain, and aided in holding him in check when on defense. In a game that the Knicks won after trailing by 16, Stallworth made a reverse layup after driving to the basket on Chamberlain in the final minutes; Wayne Coffey, a New York Daily News journalist and writer called it "one of the single most dramatic moments of the season."

Stallworth was traded along with Mike Riordan and an undisclosed amount of cash to the Baltimore Bullets for Earl Monroe on November 11, 1971. He averaged 11.4 points per game and 6.2 rebounds per game in his 64 appearances for the Bullets in 1971–72, but his statistics declined over the next two seasons and the Bullets traded him to the Phoenix Suns in 1974. Stallworth was released by the Suns without playing for the team, and he returned to the Knicks for the 1974–75 season, playing in seven games.

== NBA career statistics ==
Legend
GP	Games played	GS	Games started	MPG	Minutes per game
FG%	Field goal percentage	3P%	3-point field goal percentage	FT%	Free throw percentage
RPG	Rebounds per game	APG	Assists per game	SPG	Steals per game
BPG	Blocks per game	PPG	Points per game	**Bold**	Career high
†	Won an NBA championship	*	Led the league

=== Regular season ===
Year	Team	GP	GS	MPG	FG%	3P%	FT%	RPG	APG	SPG	BPG	PPG
1965–66	New York	80*	–	23.7	.455	–	.686	**6.2**	**2.3**	–	–	12.8
1966–67	New York	76	–	24.9	**.466**	–	.716	**6.2**	1.9	–	–	**13.0**
1969–70†	New York	**82***	–	16.8	.429	–	.716	3.9	1.7	–	–	7.8
1970–71	New York	81	–	19.3	.431	–	.735	4.3	1.3	–	–	9.4
1971–72	New York	14	–	16.1	.375	–	**.829**	2.5	1.8	–	–	6.8
1971–72	Baltimore	64	–	**28.4**	.439	–	.804	**6.2**	2.1	–	–	11.4
1972–73	Baltimore	73	–	16.7	.414	–	.772	3.2	1.5	–	–	6.0
1973–74	Capital	45	–	10.2	.401	–	.855	2.8	.6	**.6**	.1	4.4
1974–75	New York	7	–	8.1	.278	–	–	2.9	.3	.4	**.4**	1.4
Career		522	–	20.1	.438	–	.732	4.7	1.7	.6	.1	9.3

==== Playoffs ====
Year	Team	GP	GS	MPG	FG%	3P%	FT%	RPG	APG	SPG	BPG	PPG
1970†	New York	**19**	–	14.5	.459	–	**.938**	**4.1**	**1.1**	–	–	**7.2**
1971	New York	12	–	15.4	.265	–	.718	3.5	.8	–	–	5.3
1972	Baltimore	6	–	**17.5**	.429	–	.692	2.5	.8	–	–	5.5
1973	Baltimore	3	–	4.7	**1.000**	–	–	1.0	.3	–	–	.7
Career		40	–	14.5	.400	–	.765	3.4	.9	–	–	5.9

== Personal ==
After his playing career ended, Stallworth was employed in Wichita, Kansas by Boeing.
