= Xavier McDaniel =

American basketball player (born 1963)

Personal information
- Born: June 4, 1963 (age 63) Columbia, South Carolina, U.S.
- Listed height: 6 ft 7 in (2.01 m)
- Listed weight: 205 lb (93 kg)

Career information
- High school: A.C. Flora (Columbia, South Carolina)
- College: Wichita State (1981–1985)
- NBA draft: 1985: 1st round, 4th overall pick
- Drafted by: Seattle SuperSonics
- Playing career: 1985–1998
- Position: Small forward / power forward
- Number: 34, 35, 32, 31

Career history
- 1985–1990: Seattle SuperSonics
- 1990–1991: Phoenix Suns
- 1991–1992: New York Knicks
- 1992–1995: Boston Celtics
- 1995–1996: Iraklis Thessaloniki
- 1996–1998: New Jersey Nets

Career highlights
- Greek League All-Star (1996); NBA All-Star (1988); NBA All-Rookie First Team (1986); Consensus first-team All-American (1985); NCAA scoring champion (1985); 2× NCAA rebounding leader (1983, 1985); 2× MVC Player of the Year (1984, 1985); 3× First-team All-MVC (1983–1985); No. 34 retired by Wichita State Shockers

Career NBA statistics
- Points: 13,606 (15.6 ppg)
- Rebounds: 5,313 (6.1 rpg)
- Assists: 1,775 (2.0 apg)
- Stats at NBA.com
- Stats at Basketball Reference
- Collegiate Basketball Hall of Fame

Xavier Maurice McDaniel (born June 4, 1963), nicknamed "X-Man", is an American former professional basketball player who, at 6 ft 7 in, played both small forward and power forward. He played college basketball for the Wichita State Shockers.

== High school career ==
McDaniel attended A.C. Flora High School in Columbia, South Carolina. During his time there, he helped the school basketball team win the state championship in 1981.

== College career ==
While at Wichita State, McDaniel was the first person to lead the nation in both rebounding and scoring in the same season. In college, McDaniel began to shave both his head and his eyebrows to look more intimidating. He continued this all throughout his pro career.

For his first two seasons at Wichita State, the Shockers were on NCAA probation. He was a teammate his freshman year of future NBA players Antoine Carr and Cliff Levingston. When Levingston left for the NBA, McDaniel became a starter and averaged 18.8 points and 14.4 rebounds as a power forward opposite Carr. The following season, Carr left, and McDaniel raised his scoring average to 20.6 points per game and was the Missouri Valley Conference MVP. He then led the nation in scoring (27.4) and rebounding (15.0) his senior season becoming the first player to do so. Xavier McDaniel was inducted into the Missouri Valley Conference Hall of Fame in 1998.

McDaniel was a consensus First Team All American during his senior year at Wichita State as well as the NCAA leader in points and rebounds during the same year.

== Professional career ==
=== Seattle SuperSonics ===
McDaniel was selected as the 4th overall pick in the first round of the 1985 NBA draft by the Seattle SuperSonics. An instant starter, he averaged 17.1 points per game, and finished second in the NBA Rookie of the Year balloting to Patrick Ewing. His second season, he was one of a trio of 20 ppg scorers with the SuperSonics along with Dale Ellis and Tom Chambers. The SuperSonics made it to the Western Conference finals that season, before losing to the Los Angeles Lakers. In that series, on May 23, 1987, McDaniel scored a career-high 42 points and grabbed 10 rebounds in a 122–121 loss. The following season, on January 20, 1988, McDaniel scored 41 points and grabbed a career-high 19 rebounds in a win over the Knicks. On April 6, 1989, McDaniel scored 37 points, grabbed 8 rebounds, and recorded 6 assists in a 126–119 loss to the Phoenix Suns. He averaged over 20 points per game for his final three seasons as a Sonic, including the 1988–89 season when he was used primarily as sixth man. McDaniel made his only all-star appearance in 1988 with the SuperSonics.

Despite regular season success, the SuperSonics ultimately came up short in the postseason in each of McDaniel's seasons. This, paired with tension among the team's starters, such as McDaniel getting into a lengthy fist-fight with Dale Ellis, ultimately led to the SuperSonics opting for youth and dealing him away.

=== Phoenix Suns ===
McDaniel was traded fifteen games into the 1990–91 season to the Phoenix Suns for Eddie Johnson and two draft picks. The trade reunited him with teammate Tom Chambers, but it didn't produce the results the Suns were looking for. In October 1991, he was dealt to the New York Knicks for Trent Tucker, Jerrod Mustaf, and two 2nd-round picks.

=== New York Knicks ===
On the Knicks he was described as a perfect fit in coach Pat Riley's physical style. He gained some notoriety for playing the Chicago Bulls' Scottie Pippen tough in a grueling seven-game playoff series that the Bulls won on their way to their second NBA title.

=== Boston Celtics ===
Dismayed with the Knicks' subpar contract offer in the offseason, McDaniel signed with the Boston Celtics prior to the 1992–93 season. Dave Gavitt, the executive vice president for the Celtics claimed that “McDaniel wasn’t a perfect fit at his position but brought us something that would make us a better team” after signing McDaniel in free agency. During his three seasons with the Celtics, McDaniel averaged 11.3 points, 5.1 rebounds, and 1.3 assists per game.

=== Iraklis Thessaloniki ===
In 1995, McDaniel signed with Greek club Iraklis Thessaloniki. With Iraklis, he was a Greek Cup finalist, in March 1996. During the FIBA EuroLeague 1995–96 season, he averaged 18.4 points, 7.9 rebounds, and 1.4 assists per game. In the Greek Basketball League, he averaged 18.5 points, 9 rebounds and 38 minutes a game, playing in 24 of 26 games, being suspended for two.

=== New Jersey Nets ===
In October 1996, McDaniel signed with the New Jersey Nets. On March 15, 1997, McDaniel led the Nets to a win, making 4 free-throws in the final 16 seconds of a 99–98 victory over the Chicago Bulls. During his last two years with the New Jersey Nets, McDaniel's numbers started to drop off and he ultimately decided to retire after the 1998 season.

== Style of play ==
McDaniel was known for his physical style of play on the court which he often used to intimidate other players. This caused McDaniel to get into many physical altercations during games and practices.

== Post-playing career ==
After retiring from professional basketball, McDaniel moved back to his hometown of Columbia, South Carolina, to be closer and reconnect with his family. He obtained a real estate license after retirement and likes flipping houses.

McDaniel owns a janitorial supply company in Columbia, South Carolina.

== Television and film appearances ==
McDaniel had a brief cameo in the 1992 film Singles. One of the film's main characters, Steve Dunne (Campbell Scott), is having sex and begins fantasizing about a locker room interview with McDaniel in order to delay orgasm. At the end of the otherwise normal interview McDaniel says "Steve, don't cum yet." A year later McDaniel was featured on the sitcom Married... with Children in the episode "A Tisket, a Tasket, Can Peg Make a Basket?" McDaniel played an NBA All-Star who roughs up lead character Al Bundy after his wife pesters the All-Star during a basketball game.

After retiring McDaniel appeared on Spike TV's televised slamball games where he coached the Riders squad in 2003. Afterwards he made a few appearances on the reality TV game show Pros vs. Joes in 2006. Xavier McDaniel played on the Orange "All-Star" Team with fellow NBA star Clyde Drexler on an episode of Pros vs. Joes, who coincidentally also appeared with McDaniel on the same Married... with Children episode 13 years earlier.

McDaniel also appeared on the MTV2 game show Pros vs. Joes, airing in 2006. Two joes beat McDaniel in a basketball competition.

== Personal life ==
McDaniel is married to the previous head women's basketball coach at Harris-Stowe State University, Morra Gill McDaniel. They have 2 sons, Max Love and Dax Love.

McDaniel's daughter, Xylina, a 6'2" forward, was one of 36 girls invited in June 2010 to participate in the United States Under-17 basketball team trials. She was the 2013 Atlantic Coast Conference Freshman of the Year for the North Carolina Tar Heels, where she played through 2016. His son Xavier McDaniel Jr. won a state championship in 2015 for Hammond School, with former North Carolina guard Seventh Woods. Xavier Jr. played college basketball at the University of Texas Rio Grande Valley.

== NBA career statistics ==
Legend
GP	Games played	GS	Games started	MPG	Minutes per game
FG%	Field goal percentage	3P%	3-point field goal percentage	FT%	Free throw percentage
RPG	Rebounds per game	APG	Assists per game	SPG	Steals per game
BPG	Blocks per game	PPG	Points per game	**Bold**	Career high

=== Regular season ===
Year	Team	GP	GS	MPG	FG%	3P%	FT%	RPG	APG	SPG	BPG	PPG
1985–86	Seattle	**82**	80	33.0	.490	.200	.687	8.0	2.4	1.2	.5	17.1
1986–87	Seattle	**82**	**82**	**37.0**	**.509**	.214	.696	**8.6**	2.5	1.4	.6	**23.0**
1987–88	Seattle	78	77	34.7	.488	.280	.715	6.6	**3.4**	1.2	**.7**	21.4
1988–89	Seattle	**82**	10	29.1	.489	.306	.732	5.3	1.6	1.0	.5	20.5
1989–90	Seattle	69	67	35.2	.496	.294	.733	6.5	2.5	1.1	.5	21.3
1990–91	Seattle	15	15	35.3	.479	.000	.710	5.4	2.5	**1.7**	.3	21.8
1990–91	Phoenix	66	64	31.9	.503	.000	.727	7.2	2.3	.8	.6	15.8
1991–92	New York	**82**	**82**	28.6	.478	**.308**	.714	5.6	1.8	.7	.3	13.7
1992–93	Boston	**82**	27	27.0	.495	.273	**.793**	6.0	2.0	.9	.6	13.5
1993–94	Boston	**82**	5	24.0	.461	.244	.676	4.9	1.5	.6	.5	11.3
1994–95	Boston	68	15	21.0	.451	.286	.712	4.4	1.6	.4	.3	8.6
1996–97	New Jersey	62	5	18.9	.389	.200	.730	5.1	1.0	.6	.3	5.6
1997–98	New Jersey	20	0	9.0	.333	–	.625	1.6	.5	.2	.1	1.3
Career		870	529	29.0	.485	.261	.718	6.1	2.0	.9	.5	15.6
All-Star		1	0	13.0	.111	–	–	2.0	.0	.0	.0	2.0

=== Playoffs ===
Year	Team	GP	GS	MPG	FG%	3P%	FT%	RPG	APG	SPG	BPG	PPG
1987	Seattle	**14**	**14**	37.7	.488	.200	.607	8.4	3.0	**1.5**	.6	20.3
1988	Seattle	5	5	36.0	**.556**	**.500**	.500	**9.6**	**5.0**	.6	.2	**21.2**
1989	Seattle	8	8	35.1	.403	.333	**.756**	8.4	2.8	.3	.6	18.8
1991	Phoenix	4	4	25.3	.415	.000	.667	3.8	1.3	.0	.5	9.5
1992	New York	12	12	**38.2**	.477	.250	.735	7.2	1.9	.8	.2	18.8
1993	Boston	4	0	31.5	.415	.000	.667	4.5	2.3	.3	**.8**	12.5
1995	Boston	4	0	14.8	.294	.000	.750	1.5	1.3	.0	.0	3.3
Career		51	43	34.0	.464	.282	.667	7.0	2.6	.7	.4	17.0

== See also ==
- List of NCAA Division I men's basketball season rebounding leaders
- List of NCAA Division I men's basketball players with 2,000 points and 1,000 rebounds
