= Toure' Murry =

American basketball player (born 1989)

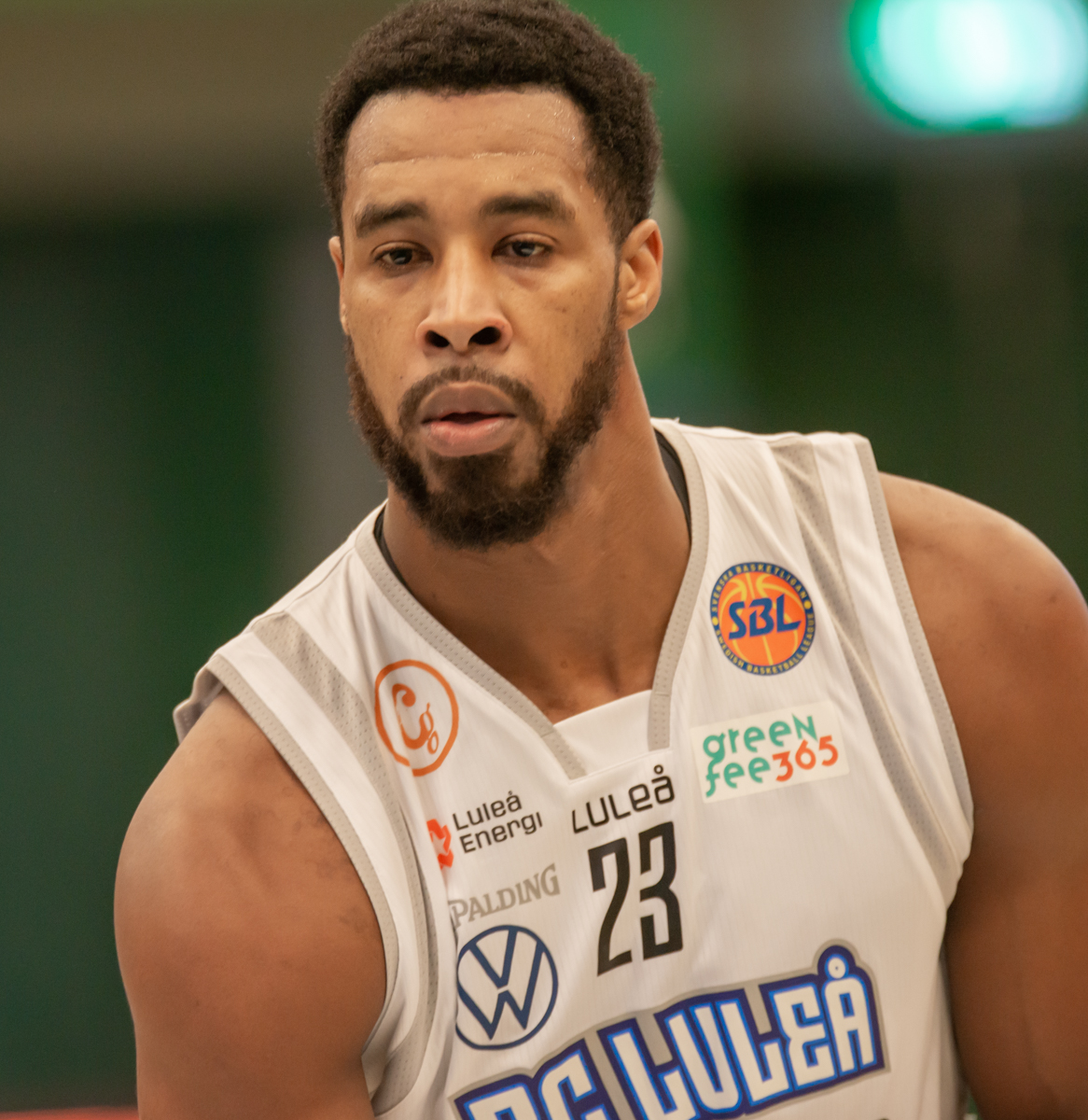
- Murry with Luleå in 2021

Philadelphia 76ers
- Title: Player development coach
- League: NBA

Personal information
- Born: November 8, 1989 (age 36) Houston, Texas, U.S.
- Listed height: 6 ft 5 in (1.96 m)
- Listed weight: 200 lb (91 kg)

Career information
- High school: Klein Forest (Houston, Texas)
- College: Wichita State (2008–2012)
- NBA draft: 2012: undrafted
- Playing career: 2012–2022
- Position: Shooting guard / point guard

Career history
- 2012–2013: Rio Grande Valley Vipers
- 2013–2014: New York Knicks
- 2014: →Erie BayHawks
- 2014–2015: Utah Jazz
- 2014–2015: →Idaho Stampede
- 2015: Rio Grande Valley Vipers
- 2015: Washington Wizards
- 2015–2016: Texas Legends
- 2016: Sioux Falls Skyforce
- 2016–2017: Yeşilgiresun Belediye
- 2017–2018: ratiopharm Ulm
- 2018: Promitheas Patras
- 2018: HKK Zrinjski Mostar
- 2018–2019: Assigeco Casalpusterlengo
- 2019–2020: Benfica
- 2020–2021: BC Luleå
- 2021: Al Qadsia
- 2022: BC Ternopil
- 2022: Astros de Jalisco

Career highlights
- CIBACOPA champion (2022); Bosnian and Herzegovinan League champion (2018); 2× NBA D-League champion (2013, 2016); NIT champion (2011); Second-team All-MVC (2011); 2× MVC All-Defensive Team (2010, 2012); MVC All-Freshman Team (2009); MVC All-Newcomer Team (2009)
- Stats at NBA.com
- Stats at Basketball Reference

Toure' Ahmad Khalid-Murry (/tʊəˈreɪ ɑːˈmɑːd xəˈliːd ˈmʌri/; born November 8, 1989) is an American former professional basketball player who is a player development coach for the Philadelphia 76ers of the National Basketball Association (NBA). He played college basketball for Wichita State.

== College career ==
Murry played college basketball at Wichita State University, leading the Shockers to the second round of the 2012 NCAA Men's Division I Basketball Tournament and winning the 2011 National Invitation Tournament. Murry averaged 12.1 points, 4.8 rebounds and 3.3 assists per game during his senior season in 2011–12.

== Professional career ==
=== 2012–13 season ===
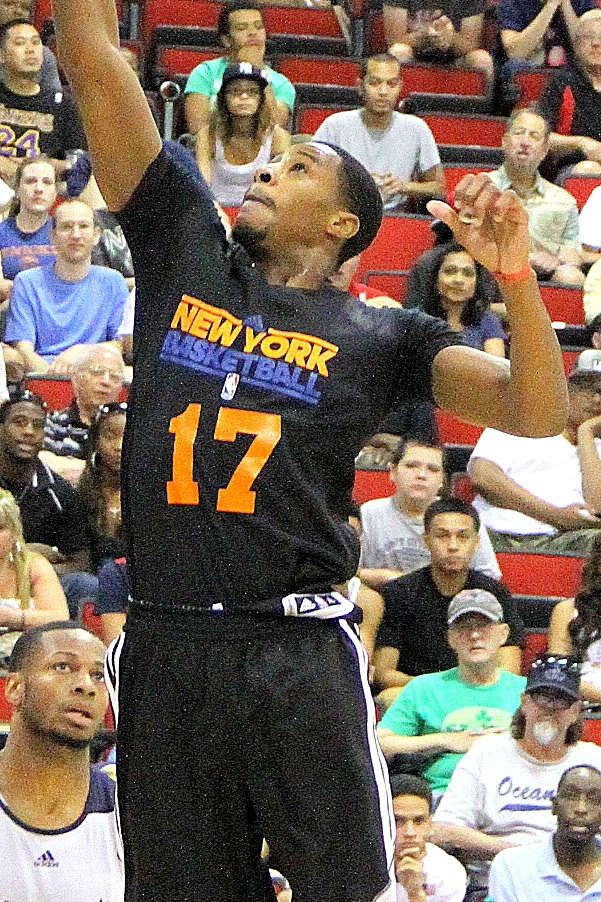
Murry playing for the Knicks in the 2013 NBA Summer League

After going undrafted in the 2012 NBA draft, Murry joined the Los Angeles Lakers for the 2012 NBA Summer League. He spent August and September in Turkey and Israel before returning to the United States. On November 2, 2012, he was selected with the 15th overall pick by the Austin Toros in the 2012 NBA Development League Draft. Three days later, he was traded to the Rio Grande Valley Vipers. During his rookie season, he played 52 games in total for the Vipers, averaging 9.0 points, 2.8 rebounds, 3.0 assists and 1.8 steals per game.

=== 2013–14 season ===
In July 2013, Murry joined the Houston Rockets for the Orlando Summer League and the New York Knicks for the Las Vegas Summer League. On September 11, 2013, he signed with the Knicks. On January 29, 2014, he was assigned to the Erie BayHawks. He was recalled the next day. On January 31, 2014, he was reassigned to the BayHawks. He was recalled the next day. In 51 games for the Knicks in 2013–14, he averaged 2.7 points and 1.0 assists per game.

=== 2014–15 season ===
On August 28, 2014, Murry signed with the Utah Jazz. On November 13, 2014, he was assigned to the Idaho Stampede. He was recalled by the Jazz on December 2, reassigned on December 31, and recalled again on January 3. He went on to make his Jazz debut later that night. The next day, he was waived by the Jazz and on January 10, he was reacquired by the Rio Grande Valley Vipers. On February 7, 2015, Murry recorded his first career triple-double after posting 10 points, 11 rebounds and 11 assists in a 109–107 win over the Texas Legends.

On March 12, 2015, Murry signed a 10-day contract with the Washington Wizards. He signed a second 10-day contract with the Wizards on March 22 but was released halfway through his contract on March 27, and returned to the Vipers three days later. He was subsequently deactivated by the Vipers and did not play for the team again in 2014–15.

=== 2015–16 season ===
In July 2015, Murry joined the Washington Wizards for the 2015 NBA Summer League, but was limited to just two total minutes of action due to a right groin injury. He later re-signed with the Wizards on September 25, 2015, only to be waived again by the team on October 24 after appearing in four preseason games.

On October 31, 2015, Murry was acquired by the Texas Legends in a trade with the Vipers. On November 13, he made his debut for the Legends in a 104–82 loss to the Austin Spurs, recording 10 points, five rebounds and seven assists in 39 minutes.

On March 4, 2016, Murry was traded to the Sioux Falls Skyforce in exchange for the returning player rights to Andre Dawkins. On March 11, he made his debut for the Skyforce in a 121–117 win over the Canton Charge, recording 12 points, three rebounds, four assists and one block in 24 minutes off the bench. He helped the Skyforce finish with a D-League-best 40–10 record in 2015–16, and went on to help the team win the league championship with a 2–1 Finals series win over the Los Angeles D-Fenders, his second D-League title.

=== 2016–17 season ===
In July 2016, Murry joined the Minnesota Timberwolves for the 2016 NBA Summer League. On September 26, 2016, he signed with the Timberwolves, but was waived on October 22 after appearing in three preseason games. On December 5, he signed with Yeşilgiresun Belediye of the Turkish Super League. On February 3, 2017, he parted ways with Yeşilgiresun.

=== 2017–18 season ===
On July 24, 2017, Murry signed with German club ratiopharm Ulm for the 2017–18 season. On January 10, 2018, he left Ulm and signed with Greek club Promitheas Patras.

=== 2019–20 season ===
On July 18, 2019, Murry joined Portuguese club Benfica of the Portuguese Basketball League. He averaged 10.6 points, 2.1 rebounds, and 2.8 assists per game. Murry left the team in January 2020.

=== 2020–21 season ===
On September 6, 2020, Murry signed with BC Luleå of the Basketligan.

=== 2021–22 season ===
Murry began the 2021–22 season with Al Qadsia of the Kuwaiti Division I Basketball League. On January 5, 2022, Murry signed with BC Ternopil of the Ukrainian Basketball SuperLeague. He then joined the Astros de Jalisco in Mexico, winning a CIBACOPA league title, before announcing his retirement in September 2022.

== Career statistics ==
Legend
GP	Games played	GS	Games started	MPG	Minutes per game
FG%	Field goal percentage	3P%	3-point field goal percentage	FT%	Free throw percentage
RPG	Rebounds per game	APG	Assists per game	SPG	Steals per game
BPG	Blocks per game	PPG	Points per game	**Bold**	Career high

=== College ===
Year	Team	GP	GS	MPG	FG%	3P%	FT%	RPG	APG	SPG	BPG	PPG
2008–09	Wichita State	34	34	28.2	.371	.321	.753	3.8	2.5	1.3	**.4**	11.0
2009–10	Wichita State	35	**35**	**31.6**	**.424**	**.331**	.708	**5.0**	3.1	**1.4**	.3	11.9
2010–11	Wichita State	**37**	33	26.1	.407	.283	**.797**	4.5	**3.4**	1.2	.3	9.4
2011–12	Wichita State	32	27	29.3	.420	.286	.786	4.8	3.3	1.2	.3	**12.1**
Career		138	127	28.8	.404	.311	.761	4.5	3.1	1.3	.3	11.1

=== NBA ===
==== Regular season ====
Year	Team	GP	GS	MPG	FG%	3P%	FT%	RPG	APG	SPG	BPG	PPG
2013–14	New York	**51**	0	**7.3**	.434	**.417**	.590	**.9**	**1.0**	**.4**	.0	**2.7**
2014–15	Utah	1	0	1.0	.000	.000	.000	.0	.0	.0	.0	.0
2014–15	Washington	4	0	4.3	**.500**	.000	**1.000**	.3	.3	.3	.0	1.5
Career		56	0	7.0	.433	.417	.610	.8	.9	.4	.0	2.6
