= Garrett Stutz =

American basketball player

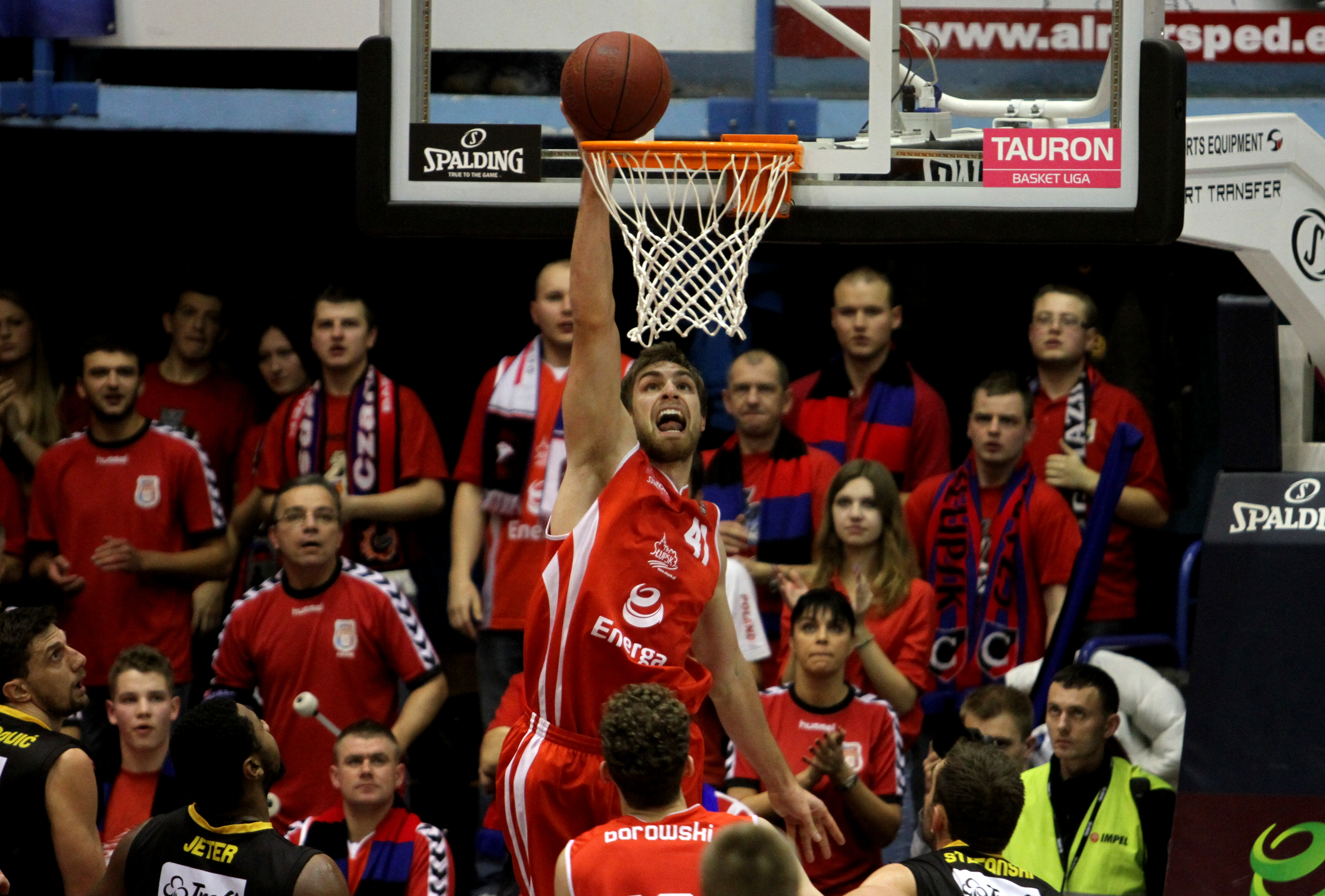
- Stutz with Energa Czarni Słupsk in 2013

Personal information
- Born: February 10, 1990 (age 36) Kansas City, Missouri, U.S.
- Listed height: 7 ft 0 in (2.13 m)
- Listed weight: 253 lb (115 kg)

Career information
- High school: North Kansas City (Kansas City, Missouri)
- College: Wichita State (2008–2012)
- NBA draft: 2012: undrafted
- Playing career: 2013–2022
- Position: Center

Career history
- 2013: Maine Red Claws
- 2013–2014: Energa Czarni Słupsk
- 2014–2015: ČEZ Nymburk
- 2015–2016: Tsmoki-Minsk
- 2016–2017: Joventut Badalona
- 2017–2018: Shimane Susanoo Magic
- 2018–2019: Toyotsu Fighting Eagles Nagoya
- 2019–2020: Gunma Crane Thunders
- 2020–2021: Osaka Evessa
- 2021: Saga Ballooners
- 2022: Hiroshima Dragonflies

Career highlights
- First-team All-MVC (2012); NIT champion (2011)
- Stats at Basketball Reference

Garrett Matthew Stutz (born February 10, 1990) is an American professional basketball player. He played college basketball at Wichita State.

== College career ==
Stutz, a 7'0" center from Kansas City, Missouri, came to Wichita State in 2008 at a slight 215 pounds. Over the course of his four-year career with the Shockers, he gained 40 pounds and improved from a role player to one of the top players in the Missouri Valley Conference (MVC). In his senior season, Stutz averaged 13.3 points and 8.0 rebounds per game and was named first-team All-MVC.

== Professional career ==
Following the close of his college career, Stutz was not selected in the 2012 NBA draft. He began his professional career with the Maine Red Claws of the NBA Development League. He averaged 5.5 points and 4.3 rebounds with the Red Claws in the 2012–13 season. After averaging 12.6 points and 7.1 rebounds for Energa Czarni Słupsk of the Polish League in 2013–14, Stutz signed with ČEZ Nymburk for the 2014–15 season.

On June 12, 2015, Stutz signed with Tsmoki-Minsk of Belarus.
