= Wichita State Shockers men's basketball =

NCAA Division college basketball program representing Wichita State University

2026–27 Wichita State Shockers men's basketball team
- University: Wichita State University
- Head coach: Paul Mills (4th season)
- Location: Wichita, Kansas
- Arena: Charles Koch Arena (capacity: 10,506)
- Conference: American
- Nickname: Shockers
- Colors: Black and yellow
- All-time record: 1,692–1,264 (.572)

NCAA Division I tournament Final Four
- 1965, 2013
Other NCAA Division I tournament results
Elite Eight	1964, 1965, 1981, 2013
Sweet Sixteen	1964, 1965, 1981, 2006, 2013, 2015
Appearances	1964, 1965, 1976, 1981, 1985, 1987, 1988, 2006, 2012, 2013, 2014, 2015, 2016, 2017, 2018, 2021

NIT champions
- 2011

Conference tournament champions
- 1985, 1987, 2014, 2017

Conference regular-season champions
- 1921, 1933, 1964, 1965, 1976, 1981, 1983, 2006, 2012, 2014, 2015, 2016, 2017, 2021

Uniforms
Home	Away	Alternate

The Wichita State Shockers men's basketball team is the NCAA Division I college basketball program representing Wichita State University in Wichita, Kansas.

The Shockers have made 16 appearances in the NCAA tournament, reaching the Final Four twice, the Elite Eight four times, and the Sweet Sixteen six times. The team plays its home games at Charles Koch Arena, where it averaged 10,391 fans per game in 2012, ranking 38th nationally.

The Shockers have made two Final Four appearances, losing both games. They made their first Final Four appearance in 1965 losing to UCLA 108–89. They made their second appearance in 2013, losing to Louisville 72–68.

In 2014, Wichita State defeated the Northern Iowa Panthers in the regular season finale for their 9th Missouri Valley conference regular season title, becoming two-time defending MVC champions. The Shockers completed a perfect, undefeated regular season and swept the conference post-season tournament en route to a #1 seed in the NCAA tournament where they lost to eventual national runner-up Kentucky in the round of 32.

The Shockers competed in the Missouri Valley Conference from 1949–50 to 2016–17 and have competed in the American Athletic Conference, now known as the American Conference, since the 2017–18 season.

== History ==
Wichita State, then known as Fairmount College, first took the court in 1906 under head coach Willis Bates. During this time, the sports teams were known as the "Wheatshockers". The first official game was held in the basement of Fairmount Hall. Fairmount lost to Washburn University by a score of 37–10. During this inaugural season, the Wheatshockers only won two games.

Fairmount acquired a permanent home when Memorial Gymnasium was opened on January 15, 1921, in a game against the American Legion of Wichita. The gym was later renamed Henrion Gymnasium in 1926. That same year, the newly renamed Municipal University of Wichita (popularly known as "WU") joined the Central Conference in athletics.

WU gained notice outside of Wichita in 1927 when, led by First-Team All-American Ross McBurney and Second-Team All-American Harold Reynolds, the Wheatshockers finished the 1927 season with a 13–1 record and a second-place finish behind conference champions Pittsburg State University.

=== Early success ===
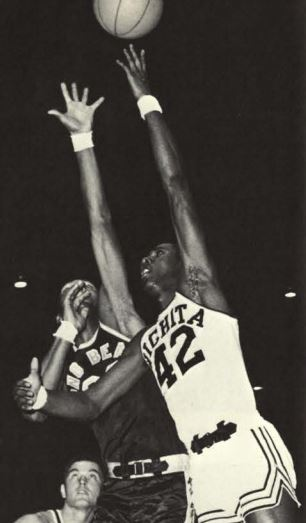
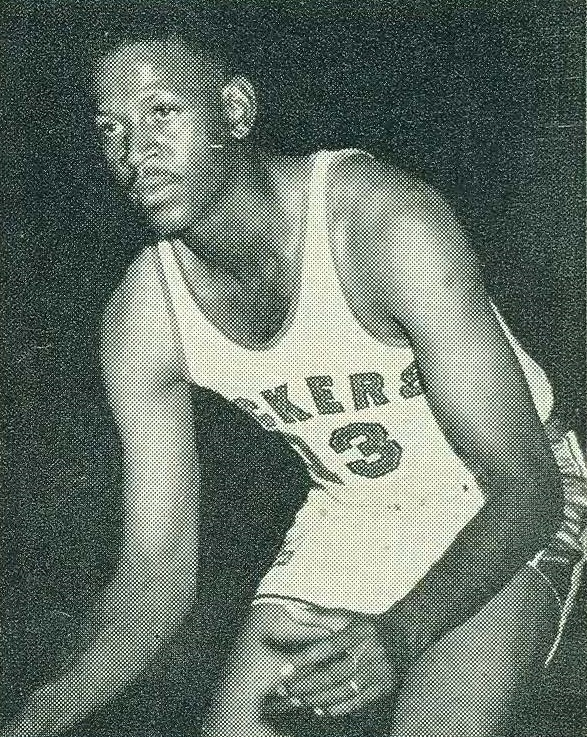
Dave Stallworth (left) and Cleo Littleton, key players of Wichita

Shocker basketball achieved greater success with the arrival of Coach Ralph Miller and Cleo Littleton in 1951. Littleton averaged 18.2 points per game as a freshman, a school record that still stands today. He was the first player west of the Mississippi to score 2,000 points in his college career and is one of only five Wichita State players to have his number retired. He was also one of the first African American players in the Missouri Valley Conference, which it joined in 1945. Littleton averaged 19 points per game during his career and he still owns 7 school records. Due to this success, Wichita State decided to construct a new home for the Shockers. Through appropriated money by the WU Board of Regents, Wichita State was able to construct a new field house for the men's basketball team, costing $1.4 million. On December 3, 1955, the Shockers played their first game in WU Field House in front of more than 9,000 fans.

Dave Stallworth entered the program in the 1961–62 season. Nicknamed "The Rave", Stallworth became the Shockers' first consensus All-American in 1964. He finished with a career scoring average of 24.2 points per game and was second on the all-time scoring list with 1,936 points. During his 13-year stint at WSU, Ralph Miller became the winningest coach in Shocker basketball history, collecting 255 victories. Miller is a member of the Naismith Memorial Basketball Hall of Fame and currently ranks as the eighth-winningest coach in college basketball history.

=== First Final Four ===
The 1964–65 season—the first after Wichita joined the state university system as Wichita State University—was the greatest in Shocker history until the 2013–14 season. On December 14, 1964, Gary Thompson led Wichita State to its first-ever No. 1 ranking. The 19–7 Shockers won the MVC and earned a berth into the Midwest Regional. After defeating Southern Methodist and an Oklahoma State team led by Henry Iba, the Shockers headed to the Final Four in Portland. There, the Shockers were matched against the defending national champion UCLA Bruins, losing 108–89. The Shockers played a third-place game against Princeton, losing 118–82.

During this period, Warren Armstrong played for the Shockers and made major contributions throughout his career. During his sophomore season, Armstrong set two school records, averaging almost 12 rebounds a game while setting a Shocker single-game assist mark with 12. Armstrong became a three-time all-Valley performer from 1966 to 1968, and still holds four of WSU's 10 triple double games (double-figure points, rebounds, assist, or blocks). He would later enjoy a productive career in the ABA. Terry Benton became a key contributor during this era as well, setting a WSU record of 16.8 rebounds per game for his career, and finishing his Wichita State career with 1,003 points and 963 rebounds.

=== Harry Miller era ===
Wichita State went 97–90 from 1971 to 1978 under Harry Miller. They had several notable players during those years including Rich Morsden, Bob Wilson, Robert Gray, Bob Trogele, Cheese Johnson, Cal Bruton and Robert Elmore. They made it to the NCAA tournament in 1976, winning the Missouri Valley Conference and losing by one point to eventual national runner up Michigan. The following year they beat eventual NCAA Champion Marquette in Al McGuire's final home game in Milwaukee.

=== Elite Eight appearance and sanctions ===
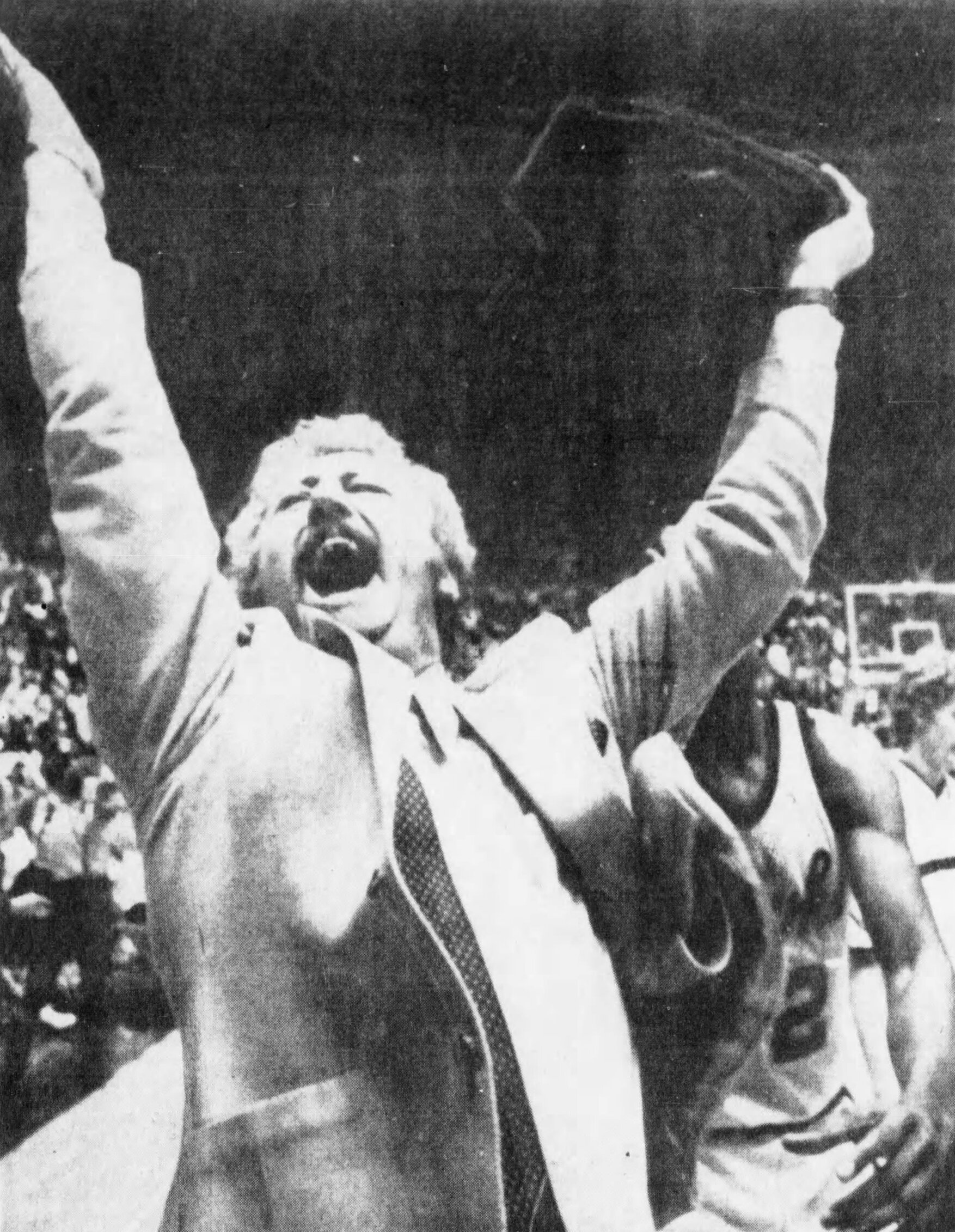
Coach Smithson celebrates after the Shockers upset Iowa in the 1981 NCAA tournament.

In 1981, the Shockers would return to the NCAA tournament, defeating the Kansas Jayhawks 66–65 in the "Battle of New Orleans" before being defeated by LSU 96–85 in the Elite Eight. The 1980–81 team featured two future NBA players – Cliff Levingston and Antoine Carr, who would be chosen in the first 10 picks of the NBA draft. Carr, a local star from Wichita, would become WSU's third All-American in 1983, averaging 22.2 points a game during his senior season, and finishing his career with 1,911 points while shooting 55.7 percent. Levingston would average 15.7 and 18.5 points per game while leading the team in scoring his freshman and sophomore years, before declaring early for the NBA Draft.

Another future NBA player, Xavier McDaniel, would arrive the year after the Elite Eight season. McDaniel scored 2,152 points at Wichita State, second all-time behind Littleton, and set the school record with 1,359 rebounds. In 1984–85, McDaniel became the first player in NCAA Division I history to lead the nation in scoring (27.2 points per game) and rebounding (14.8 per game) in the same season.

In 1982, Wichita State would be placed under NCAA probation for the 1982–83 and 1983–84 seasons, regarding improper actions of former assistant coaches in the late 1970s.

In nine seasons, Smithson won 155 games, placing him second in school history behind Ralph Miller. Smithson was the first coach to guide WSU to consecutive 20-win seasons. During the four-year span from 1980 to 1984, WSU produced a 92–29 record, the best four-year span in team history at the time.

=== Return to the tournament ===
WSU hired Topeka, Kansas native Mark Turgeon as head coach on March 11, 2000. Turgeon guided the Shockers to a 9–19 record during his first season. In Turgeon's second year Wichita State began its resurgence with a combination of several veterans and newcomers to compile a 15–15 record in 2001–02.

Helped by an 11–3 record in Levitt Arena, WSU's overall record in the arena rose to 502–185 since it opened during the 1955–56 season. In the 2002–03 season, the Shockers would improve to 18 wins, and then to 21 wins in the 2003–04 season.

In 2004–05, Wichita State continued to improve, reaching the third game of the NIT, and taking the Shockers to back-to-back-to-back postseason trips for the first time since 1987–88–89. WSU's 2004–05 team went 22–10 overall, finished second in the Missouri Valley Conference, and were ranked in the top 30 for nine weeks.

In 2005–06, Turgeon lead WSU to its best season in over 20 years, reaching the Sweet 16 with victories over 10th seeded Seton Hall and shocking 2nd seeded Tennessee. In the Sweet 16, the Shockers would go on to lose to eventual Final Four participant George Mason.

In 2006–07, the Shockers entered the season with high expectations, and surged out to a 9–0 start, including a revenge-win over George Mason, as well as road victories over #6 LSU and #14 Syracuse. WSU rose as high as #8 in both the AP and Coaches' Polls on December 18, 2006, but the Shockers would struggle for much of the rest of the season, falling from the rankings and finishing 17–14, including only eight conference wins, for Turgeon's second worst mark as WSU head coach.

Head Coach Mark Turgeon left Wichita State on April 10, 2007, after a seven-year run and a 128–90 record, (at the time) the third winningest coach in Shocker history behind Ralph Miller and Gene Smithson. On April 14, 2007, Gregg Marshall was announced as 26th head men's basketball coach at Wichita State.

=== Second Final Four and undefeated regular season ===
Gregg Marshall previously coached at Winthrop University for nine seasons. In his first season (2007–08) the team finished with a record of 11–20. In his second season they posted a 17–17 record, complete with a run to the second round of the 2009 CBI Tournament where they lost to Stanford. The following season the Shockers went 25–10, culminating with an NIT appearance. The invitation was due in large part to their strong 16–1 home record. Their only loss at home that year was in the NIT against Nevada.

In the 2010–11 season Wichita State improved once again to finish the season at 29–8, finishing second in the Missouri Valley to Missouri State. The Shockers would go on to win the NIT championship as a 4 seed, defeating two #1 seeds, first Virginia Tech 79–76, and then beating Alabama in the championship game 66–57.

In the 2011–12 season, they continued to improve under Marshall's guidance. In winning the regular season MVC title at 16–2 (26–4 overall), the Shockers reached a ranking of #14 in the coaches poll and #15 in the AP poll. After losing to Illinois State in the semi-finals of the MVC tourney in St. Louis, the Shockers were selected at large for the NCAA tournament as a 5 seed, their first NCAA Tournament in 6 years. They fell to VCU 62–59, ending the season with a 27–6 record.

Heading into the 2012–2013 season, despite being the reigning regular-season champions, the Shockers were predicted to finish fourth in the Missouri Valley Conference. Wichita State went into the season having lost five of the top six scorers from the previous season, including Joe Ragland, Toure' Murry, Garrett Stutz, Ben Smith, and David Kyles. Despite the losses, the Shockers went on to win their first 9 games, including the Cancún Challenge, as well as 15 of their first 16, and 19 of their first 21. Wichita struggled in conference-play, however, losing three in a row in late January and early February. Nevertheless, the Shockers would eventually play rival Creighton in the final game of the season for the outright conference championship, losing in Omaha.

In the 2012–13 NCAA tournament, the Shockers upset top-seeded Gonzaga to move on to the Sweet 16 for the first time since 2006, followed by a 72–58 win over La Salle for their first Elite Eight appearance since 1981. They defeated Ohio State 70–66 for their first Final Four appearance since 1965, as well as their 30th win of the season, a then-Wichita State record. In the Final Four, Wichita State was defeated by the #1 overall seed and eventual tournament champion Louisville, 72–68 but that game was later vacated in 2018 by the NCAA.

The 2013–14 season proved to be historic and possibly the greatest season in Shocker history. The Shockers cracked the top 10 at #2 in the nation in both major polls, for the first time since December 2006. It was the highest that the Shockers had been ranked that late in the season in school history. On February 25, with a win over Bradley, the Shockers became just the 11th Division I team to start the season 30–0. They were also the first team to do so solely in the regular season, as the prior 10 teams reached that mark in the postseason. A week later, with a dominating 68–45 win over Missouri State, the Shockers became the first Division I team to finish the regular season 31–0. The Shockers ran the table with the 2014 Missouri Valley Conference men's basketball tournament, winning all three games by double digits. This was the first time Wichita State won the Valley Tournament since 1987. The Shockers received the #1 ranking in the Midwest Region of the 2014 NCAA Division I men's basketball tournament. Wichita State blew out their first opponent, Cal Poly, to become the first team in the history of college basketball to advance to a record of 35–0 (a mark matched by Kentucky in the 2014–15 season). The Shockers season ended with an instant classic of a game with the Kentucky Wildcats on a missed 3-pointer at the buzzer. Their final record ended up being 35–1.

=== Marshall departure and decline ===
After the 2019–20 season, eight Shockers players entered the NCAA transfer portal, with seven eventually leaving the program. During this period, several former players alleged a pattern of physical and verbal abuse of players, leading to the university hiring a St. Louis-based law firm to conduct an independent investigation. Marshall resigned shortly before the 2020–21 season, with Wichita State buying out his contract for $7.75 million over six years. Assistant coach Isaac Brown was named interim head coach for 2020–21.

In Brown's first year, he took the Shockers to the NCAA Tournament but lost to Drake in the First Four. During the season, he was named full-time head coach. The following 2 seasons, the Shockers would finish 32–28 and were not invited to any postseason tournament. This led to Wichita State firing Brown on March 11, 2023.

Wichita State hired Paul Mills on March 22, 2023.

== Rivalries ==
When Wichita State became an AP Top 25 regular in the early 2010s, there came interest in reviving annual games against Kansas and Kansas State. In February 2013, Kansas state senator Michael O'Donnell introduced a bill requiring Kansas and Kansas State to schedule Wichita State, but the bill never passed. Kansas and Wichita State scheduled a game for the 2023–24 season, their first regular season game since 1993. Wichita State last played Kansas in the 2015 NCAA tournament, a game they won 78–65. Kansas leads the all-time series 12–3. They last played Kansas State in the 2024–25 season, a game which they won 84–65. Kansas State leads the all-time series 20–10.

=== Missouri State ===
Wichita State had an in-conference rivalry with Missouri State dating back to the 1941–42 season (when Missouri State University was Southwest Missouri State Teacher's College). As of the 2016–17 season, following a 15-game winning streak in the series, Wichita State leads the series 39–30.

=== Tulsa ===
Wichita State's rivalry with Tulsa dates back to the 1930–31 season. The two schools were in the Missouri Valley Conference from 1945 to 1996. Beginning in the 1996–97 season, this series continued as an out-of-conference rivalry and has been most recently continuously played since the 2010–11 season, after being played in the 1996–97, 1997–98, and 2000–01 to 2004–05 seasons. As of the end of the 2020–21 season, Wichita State leads the series 72–62 following 15 games since the series resumed in 2010. Tulsa ended WSU's 5-game winning streak with a buzzer-beating 3-point win in Tulsa in February 2020, but WSU has won three since then, two at home and one on the road, including a tight 4-point game.

=== Creighton ===
Wichita State had an intense rivalry with the Creighton Bluejays during their time together in the Missouri Valley. Both squads were known as the cream of the crop in the MVC and went back and forth every year, trading the title of best team in the league. In all, the teams have played a total of 100 games against each other, with Creighton leading the overall series 55–45.

== Facilities ==
The Shockers have played their home games at Charles Koch Arena, a 10,506 seat on-campus arena, since 1953. Originally known as the University of Wichita Field House, it was officially renamed Levitt Arena in 1969 for Henry Levitt, owner of Henry's, who sponsored a Wichita basketball team (known as the Henry Clothiers) that won three consecutive national Amateur Athletic Union titles in the 1930s. Due to its circular design, which gave nearly every fan a clear sight line and put the seats very close to the action, it was quickly nicknamed "The Roundhouse." Following a $6 million endowment from Charles G. Koch the arena underwent a $25 million renovation in 2002–03, popularly known as the "Roundhouse Renaissance." The old arena concourse was completely demolished and a new one built around the original playing/seating area. A portion of the seating bowl was remodeled to make for more legroom. All new seating was installed as well as a video scoreboard, and virtually every surface that was not renovated was given a fresh coat of paint. The Shocker basketball teams played at the Kansas Coliseum for the 2002–03 season while the arena was rebuilt. In 2012, the Shockers averaged 10,391 fans per game, ranking 38th nationally. In January 2013, ESPN's Jason King listed Koch Arena as the 7th best home court advantage in college basketball.

In addition to Koch Arena, the Shockers have played one game for each of the last eleven seasons (except 2020–21) across town at the Intrust Bank Arena, the second largest indoor arena in the state of Kansas at 15,004 seats. Wichita State is 8–3 (as of the 2020–21 season) when playing at Intrust Bank Arena.

== Coaches ==
The Shockers have had 27 head coaches in program history. Of these, only 7 coached five or more seasons. They have had two different coaches take them to the Final Four and seven different coaches have taken them to the NCAA Tournament. Gregg Marshall is the all-time leader in wins, win percentage among coaches who have coached at least 25 games, tournament appearances, and tournament wins. Marshall also has just as many tournament appearances as every other coach in program history combined and is the longest-tenured head coach in program history having coached for 13 seasons.

=== Coaching history ===
Coach	Years	Overall record	Winning %
Willis Bates	1905–08, 1913–14	15–20	.429
Roy Thomas	1909–12	12–24	.333
E.V. Long	1912–13	1–11	.083
Harry Buck	1914–16	14–15	.483
Lamar Hoover	1916–18, 1921–23	30–32	.484
Kenneth Cassidy	1919–20	8–8	.500
Wilmer Elfrink	1920–21	16–2	.889
Sam Hill	1923–25	19–21	.475
Leonard Umnus	1925–28	47–14	.770
Gene Johnson	1928–33	74–24	.755
Lindsay Austin	1934–35	7–13	.350
Bill Hennigh	1935–41	59–68	.472
Jack Starrett	1941–42	4–16	.200
Mel Binford	1942–43, 1944–48	60–52	.536
Ken Gunning	1948–51	26–49	.347
Ralph Miller	1951–64	220–133	.623
Gary Thompson	1964–71	93–94	.497
Harry Miller	1971–78	97–90	.519
Gene Smithson	1978–86	155–81	.657
Eddie Fogler	1986–89	61–32	.656
Mike Cohen	1989–92	32–56	.364
Scott Thompson	1992–96	40–70	.364
Randy Smithson	1996–00	55–62	.470
Mark Turgeon	2000–07	128–90	.587
Gregg Marshall	2007–20	337–119	.739
Isaac Brown	2020–23	48–34	.585
Paul Mills	2023–present	34–34	.500
Head coaches:			27

== Notable players ==
=== Retired numbers ===
Wichita State Shockers retired numbers
No.	Player	Tenure	Ref.
13	Cleo Littleton	1952–1955	
34	Xavier McDaniel	1981–1985	
35	Antoine Carr	1979–1983	
42	Dave Stallworth	1961–1965	
54	Cliff Levingston	1979–1983	

=== Players in the NBA/ABA ===
Name	WSU year(s)	Position	Team	Round	Pick	Overall	Pro year(s)	Ref.
Gene Wiley	1959–62	C	Los Angeles Lakers	2	8	15	1962–67	
Dave Stallworth	1962–65	PF-C	New York Knicks	1	3	3	1965–74	
Nate Bowman	1962–65	C	Cincinnati Royals	1	7	7	1966–71	
Warren Jabali	1965–68	SG-SF	Oakland Oaks	4	8	44	1968–74	
Bobby Wilson	1972–74	PG	Chicago Bulls	3	16	52	1974–77	
Lynbert "Cheese" Johnson	1975–79	PF	Golden State Warriors	3	10	54	1979–80	
Cliff Levingston	1979–82	PF	Detroit Pistons	1	9	9	1982–94	
Antoine Carr	1979–83	PF-C	Detroit Pistons	1	8	8	1984–99	
Ozell Jones	1979–81	C-PF	San Antonio Spurs	4	20	90	1984–85	
Xavier McDaniel	1981–85	SF-PF	Seattle SuperSonics	1	4	4	1985–97	
Greg Dreiling	1981–82	C	Indiana Pacers	2	2	26	1986–96	
Maurice Evans	1997–99	SG-SF	Undrafted	–	–	–	2001–02, 2004–12	
Gal Mekel	2006–08	PG-SG	Undrafted	–	–	–	2013–14	
Toure' Murry	2008–12	PG-SG-SF	Undrafted	–	–	–	2013–16	
Cleanthony Early	2012–14	PF	New York Knicks	2	4	34	2014–16	
Ron Baker	2012–16	SG	Undrafted; New York Knicks	–	–	–	2016–19	
Fred VanVleet	2012–16	PG	Undrafted; Houston Rockets	–	–	–	2016–	
Landry Shamet	2015–18	SG	Phoenix Suns	1	26	26	2018–	
Craig Porter Jr.	2020–23	PG	Undrafted; Cleveland Cavaliers	–	–	–	2023–	
Dexter Dennis	2018–22	F	Undrafted; Dallas Mavericks	–	–	–	2023–	
Jaime Echenique	2018–20	C	Undrafted; Washington Wizards	–	–	–	2021–22	
Ricky Council IV	2020–22	F	Undrafted; Philadelphia 76ers	–	–	–	2024–25	
Austin Reaves	2016–18	PG-SG	Undrafted; Los Angeles Lakers	–	–	–	2021–	

== Players in international leagues ==
- Qua Grant (born 1999), basketball player in the Israeli Basketball Premier League
- Markis McDuffie (born 1997), basketball player for Maccabi Ashdod in the Israeli Basketball Premier League
- Grant Sherfield (born 1999), in the Israeli Basketball Premier League

=== Olympians ===
The following Shockers represented their country in the Olympics. Both participants represented the United States.

Year	Player	Medal
1936	Francis Johnson	Gold medal
1936	Jack Ragland	Gold medal
Year	Coach	Medal
1936	Gene Johnson	Gold medal

=== Notable in other fields ===
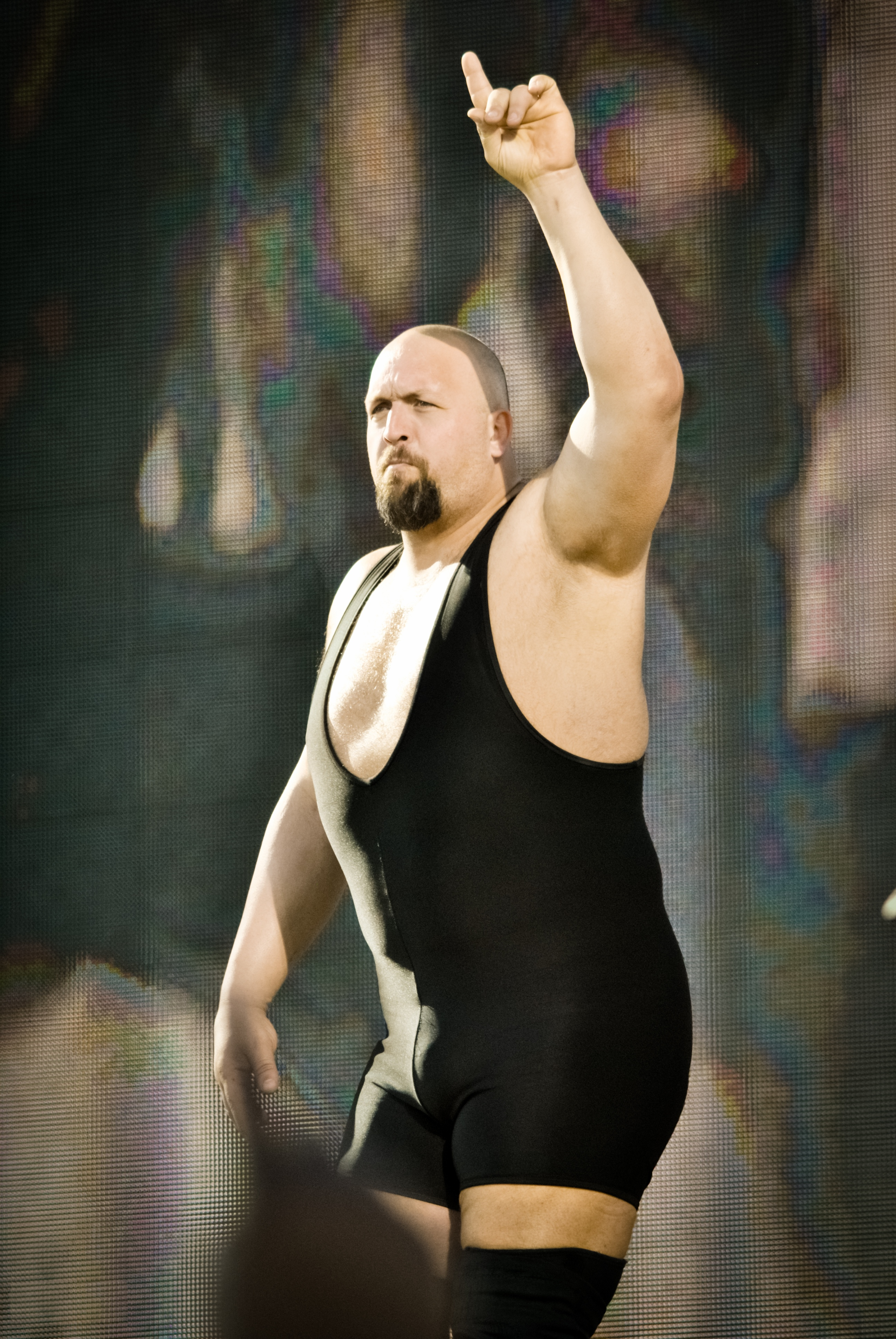
Paul Wight, known under the ring name Big Show, played center at Wichita State before beginning his wrestling career.

- Paul Wight, actor and wrestler under the ring name Big Show

=== Individual season records ===
- Statistics prior to 2013–14 season courtesy of Wichita State University Men's Basketball Fact Book. 2013–14 statistics courtesy of Wichita State Sports Information.

==== Points ====
Rank	Points	Player	Season
1	844	Xavier McDaniel	1984–85
2	769	Dave Stallworth	1963–64
3	632	Maurice Evans	1998–99
4	619	Xavier McDaniel	1983–84
5	612	Cliff Levingston	1980–81
6	609	Dave Stallworth	1962–63
7	600	Cheese Johnson	1978–79
8	595	James Thompson	1965–66
9	581	Greg Carney	1969–70
10	575	Aubrey Sherrod	1984–85

==== Field goal percentage ====
Rank	Percentage	FGM/A	Player	Season
1	61.6	133–216	Steve Grayer	1987–88
2	61.1	77–126	Adam Grundvig	2000–01
3	60.5	89–147	Claudius Johnson	1991–92
4	59.5	131–220	Henry Carr	1986–87
5	59.3	223–376	Xavier McDaniel	1982–83
6	59.0	102–173	Neil Strom	1991–92
7	58.8	94–160	Ryan Martin	2006–07
8	58.6	211–360	Antoine Carr	1980–81
9	57.7	86–149	Karl Papke	1982–83
10	57.6	89–147	Ramon Clemente	2008–09

==== Three-point field goals ====
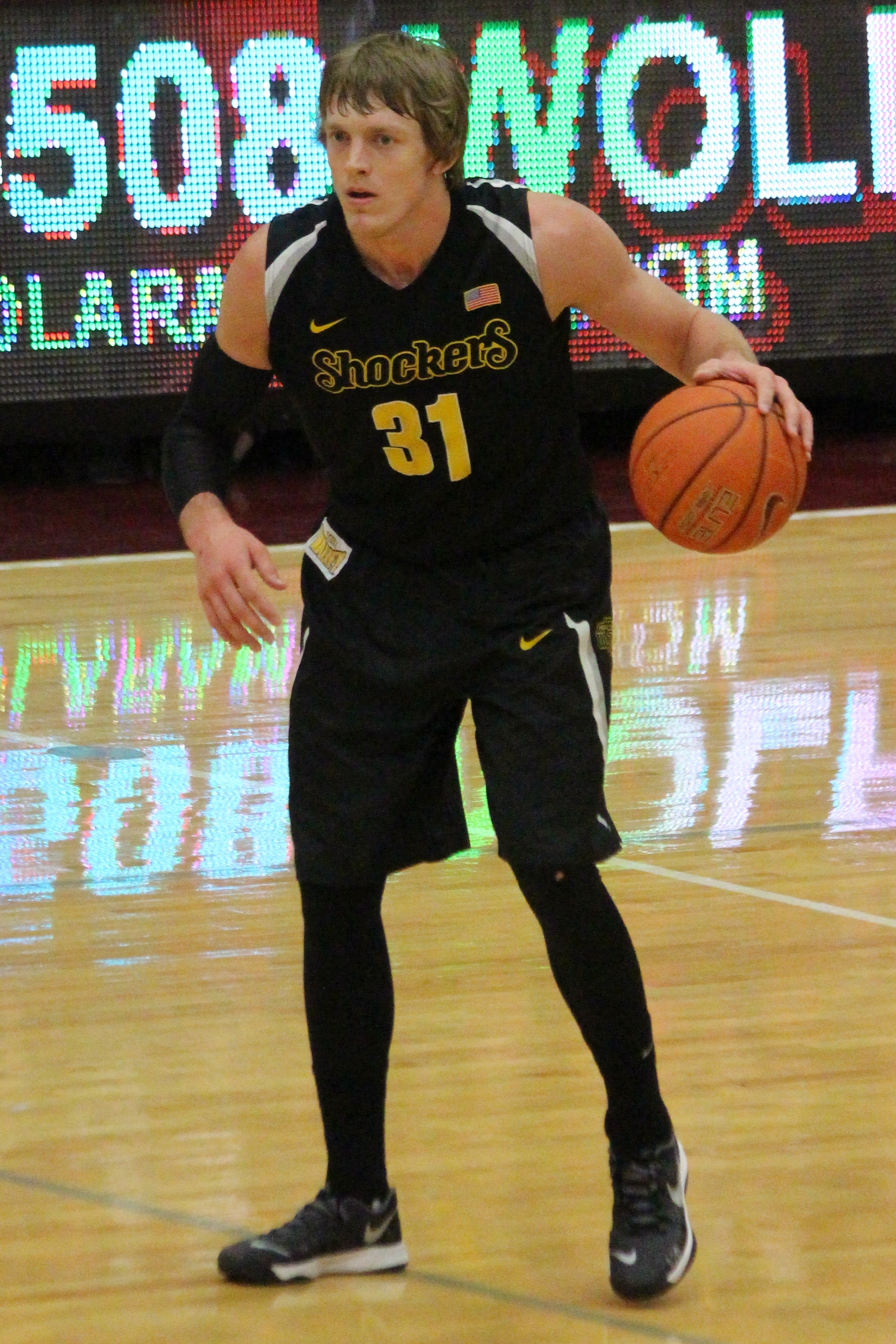
Ron Baker, who is in Wichita State's top 10 in career scoring, three-pointers, assists, and steals.

Rank	Three-pointers	Player	Season
1	99	Colby Rogers	2023-24
2	91	Sean Ogirri	2005-06
3	66	Landry Shamet	2017–18
3	66	Markis McDuffie	2018–19
5	80	Ron Baker	2014–15
6	75	David Kyles	2010–11
7	75	Connor Frankamp	2010–11
7	75	Tyson Etienne	2021-22
9	72	Landry Shamet	2016-17
10	69	Maurice Evans	1998–99

==== Three-point percentage ====
Rank	Percentage	3PM/A	Player	Season
1	50.4	57–113	Joe Ragland	2011–12
2	50.0	22–44	Matt Clark	2003–04
3	48.4	46–95	Joe Griffin	1987–88
4	47.8	44–92	Gary Cundiff	1986–87
5	47.5	28–59	Rob Kampman	2001–02
6	46.5	20–43	Keith Bonds	1988–89
7	46.4	51–110	Dwight Praylow	1987–88
8	46.2	24–52	Matt Clark	2002–03
9	45.0	18–40	Jamar Howard	2002–03
10	44.6	33–74	Lew Hill	1987–88

==== Free throws made ====
Rank	Free throws	Player	Season
1	220	Cleo Littleton	1954–55
2	203	Dave Stallworth	1963–64
3	165	Dave Stallworth	1962–63
4	155	Cleo Littleton	1952–53
5	152	Jamar Howard	2003–04
6	151	Cleanthony Early	2013–14
7	143	Greg Carney	1969–70
7	143	Joe Stevens	1955–56
9	142	Xavier McDaniel	1984–85
10	141	Jason Perez	1998–99

==== Free throw percentage ====
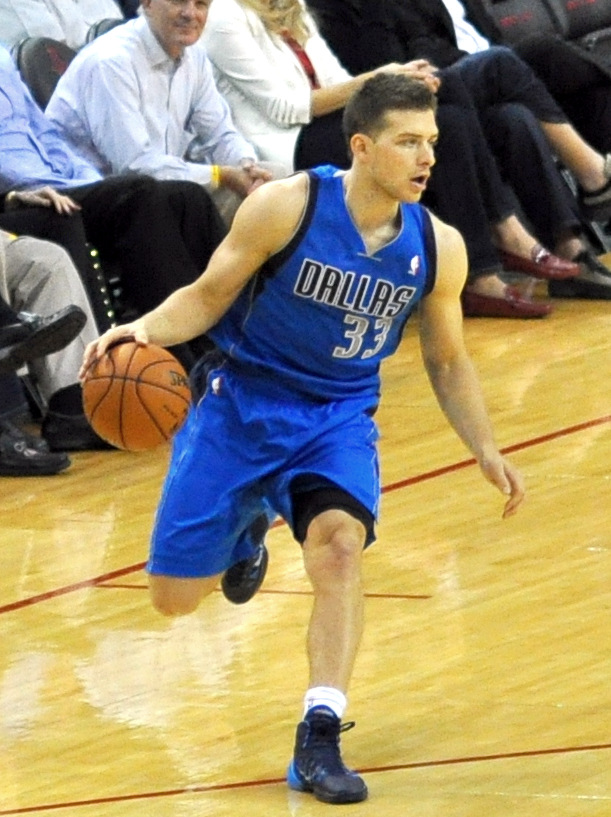
Gal Mekel

Rank	Percentage	FTM/A	Player	Season
1	91.0	61–67	CC McFall	2000–01
2	90.5	124–137	Jamie Thompson	1966–67
3	90.4	85–94	Clevin Hannah	2009–10
4	88.8	151-170	Xavier Bell	2024-25
5	88.3	68–77	Bobby Wilson	1973–74
6	87.7	57–65	Joe Ragland	2010–11
7	87.7	71–81	Gal Mekel	2007–08
8	87.0	67–77	Bob Trogele	1976–77
9	85.9	61–71	Lanny Van Eman	1961–62
10	85.9	67–78	Ernie Moore	1962–63

==== Rebounds ====
Rank	Rebounds	Player	Season
1	460	Xavier McDaniel	1984–85
2	441	Robert Elmore	1976–77
3	437	Terry Benton	1970–71
4	403	Xavier McDaniel	1982–83
5	393	Xavier McDaniel	1983–84
6	376	Cliff Levingston	1980–81
7	364	Terry Benton	1971–72
8	323	Warren Armstrong	1965–66
9	302	Gene Wiley	1960–61
9	302	Robert Elmore	1974–75
9	302	Quincy Ballard	2024-25

==== Assists ====
Rank	Assists	Player	Season
1	194	Warren Armstrong	1967–68
2	193	Fred VanVleet	2013–14
3	184	Tony Martin	1980–81
4	183	Fred VanVleet	2014–15
5	181	Joe Griffin	1987–88
6	172	Fred VanVleet	2015–16
7	169	Fridge Holman	2003–04
8	167	Melvin McKey	1995–96
9	163	Randy Smithson	1980–81
10	157	Malcolm Armstead	2012–13

==== Steals ====
Rank	Steals	Player	Season
1	76	Malcolm Armstead	2012–13
2	69	Fred VanVleet	2013–14
3	67	Jason Perez	1999–2000
4	66	Fred VanVleet	2014–15
5	63	Robert George	1990–91
6	62	Jason Perez	1997–98
7	57	Preston Carrington	1970–71
7	57	Robert George	1991–92
9	55	Jason Perez	1998–99
9	55	Fred VanVleet	2015–16

==== Blocked shots ====
Rank	Blocks	Player	Season
1	80	Gene Wiley	1961–62
2	74	Quincy Ballard	2023-24
3	69	Robert Elmore	1976–77
4	65	Antoine Carr	1980–81
5	64	Quincy Ballard	2024-25
6	56	Robert Elmore	1974–75
6	56	Ehimen Orupke	2012–13
8	55	Terry Benton	1970–71
8	55	Carl Hall	2012–13
10	54	Antoine Carr	1981–82

=== Individual game records ===
- Statistics courtesy of Wichita State University Men's Basketball Fact Book.

==== Points ====
Rank	Points	Player	Opponent	Date
1	47	Antoine Carr	Southern Illinois	March 5, 1983
2	46	Dave Stallworth	Cincinnati	February 16, 1963
3	45	Dave Stallworth	Loyola (Chicago)	January 29, 1965
3	45	Ron Harris	Southern Illinois	December 18, 1971
5	44	Xavier McDaniel	West Texas State	January 26, 1985
6	43	Dave Stallworth	Arizona State–Tempe	December 7, 1963
6	43	Xavier McDaniel	Bradley	January 10, 1985
8	40	Al Tate	Tulsa	March 5, 1960
8	40	Dave Stallworth	Louisville	January 30, 1965
10	39	Dave Stallworth	Montana State	December 26, 1963
10	39	Cleanthony Early	Southern Illinois	January 9, 2013

==== Rebounds ====
Rank	Points	Player	Opponent	Date
1	29	Terry Benton	North Texas State	January 11, 1971
2	28	Terry Benton	Loyola (Chicago)	February 6, 1971
3	26	Larry Callis	Drake	January 13, 1996
3	26	Gene Wiley	Bradley	January 20, 1962
3	26	Ron Harris	Loyola (Chicago)	February 14, 1970
6	25	Robert Elmore	New Mexico State	February 12, 1977
7	24	Warren Armstrong	NYU	March 14, 1966
7	24	Terry Benton	Memphis State	January 26, 1971
7	24	Terry Benton	West Texas State	March 4, 1972
10	40	Al Tate	Tulsa	March 5, 1960
10	40	Dave Stallworth	Louisville	January 30, 1965

=== Career records ===
- Statistics courtesy of Wichita State University Men's Basketball Fact Book.

==== Games played ====
Rank	Games	Player	Seasons
1	141	Tekele Cotton	2011–15
1	141	Fred VanVleet	2012–16
3	140	Demetric Williams	2009–13
4	139	Toure' Murry	2008–12
5	138	Garrett Stutz	2008–12
5	137	J. T. Durley	2007–11
7	136	Aaron Ellis	2008–12
8	132	Paul Miller	2002–06
9	128	David Kyles	2008–12
10	126	PJ Cousinard	2005–08

==== Games started ====
Rank	Games	Player	Seasons
1	130	Toure' Murry	2008–12
2	121	Ron Baker	2012–16
3	119	Paul Miller	2002–06
4	118	Jamar Howard	2001–05
5	116	Aubrey Sherrod	1981–85
6	115	Randy Burns	2001–05
7	104	Rob Kampman	2001–05
8	101	Jason Perez	1996–2000
9	98	Tekele Cotton	2011–15
10	98	Paul Guffrovich	1987–91

==== Points ====
Rank	Points	Player	Seasons
1	2164	Cleo Littleton	1951–55
2	2152	Xavier McDaniel	1981–85
3	1936	Dave Stallworth	1962–65
4	1911	Antoine Carr	1979–83
5	1907	Cheese Johnson	1975–79
6	1839	Jason Perez	1996–2000
7	1765	Aubrey Sherrod	1981–85
8	1636	Ron Baker	2012–16
9	1599	Randy Burns	2001–05
10	1571	Jamar Howard	2001–05

==== Rebounds ====
Rank	Rebounds	Player	Seasons
1	1359	Xavier McDaniel	1981–85
2	1039	Robert Elmore	1973–77
3	1027	Cheese Johnson	1975–79
4	985	Cliff Levingston	1979–82
5	963	Terry Benton	1969–72
6	878	Cleo Littleton	1951–55
7	839	Warren Armstrong	1965–68
8	838	Dave Stallworth	1962–65
8	776	Antoine Carr	1979–83
10	774	Al Tate	1957–60

==== Field goal percentage ====
Rank	FG%	FGM/A	Player	Seasons
1	56.4	893–1584	Xavier McDaniel	1987–88
2	55.7	763–1370	Antoine Carr	1979–83
3	54.3	304–557	Claudius Johnson	1989–93
4	53.8	597–1110	Cliff Levingston	1979–82
5	53.0	719–1356	Dave Stallworth	1962–65
6	53.0	517–975	Jamar Howard	2001–05
7	52.3	741–1418	Cheese Johnson	1975–79
8	52.2	326–624	Tony Martin	1980–82
9	51.5	413–802	Garrett Stutz	2008–12
10	51.4	286–556	Randy Smithson	1979–81

==== Three-point field goals ====
Rank	Three-pointers	Player	Seasons
1	248	Randy Burns	2001–05
2	241	Ron Baker	2012–16
3	200	Sean Ogirri	2004–07
4	197	Terrell Benton	1998–2002
5	196	Jason Perez	1996–2000
6	153	David Kyles	2008–12
7	144	Paul Gruffrovich	1987–91
8	141	Fred VanVleet	2012–16
9	140	Ryan Herrs	1992–96
10	135	Toure' Murry	2008–12

==== Free throw percentage ====
Rank	FT%	FTM/A	Player	Seasons
1	85.3	337–395	Jamie Thompson	1964–67
2	85.0	164–193	Sean Ogirri	2004–07
3	84.1	127–151	Joe Ragland	2010–12
4	84.0	289–344	Kyle Wilson	2004–07
5	83.5	193–231	Paul Gruffrovich	1987–91
6	82.7	140–173	CC McFall	2000–02
7	82.6	261–316	Lanny Van Eman	1959–62
8	82.2	152–185	Clevin Hannah	2008–10
9	82.1	119–145	Ron Mendell	1965–69
10	81.5	132–162	Bobby Wilson	1972–74

==== Assists ====
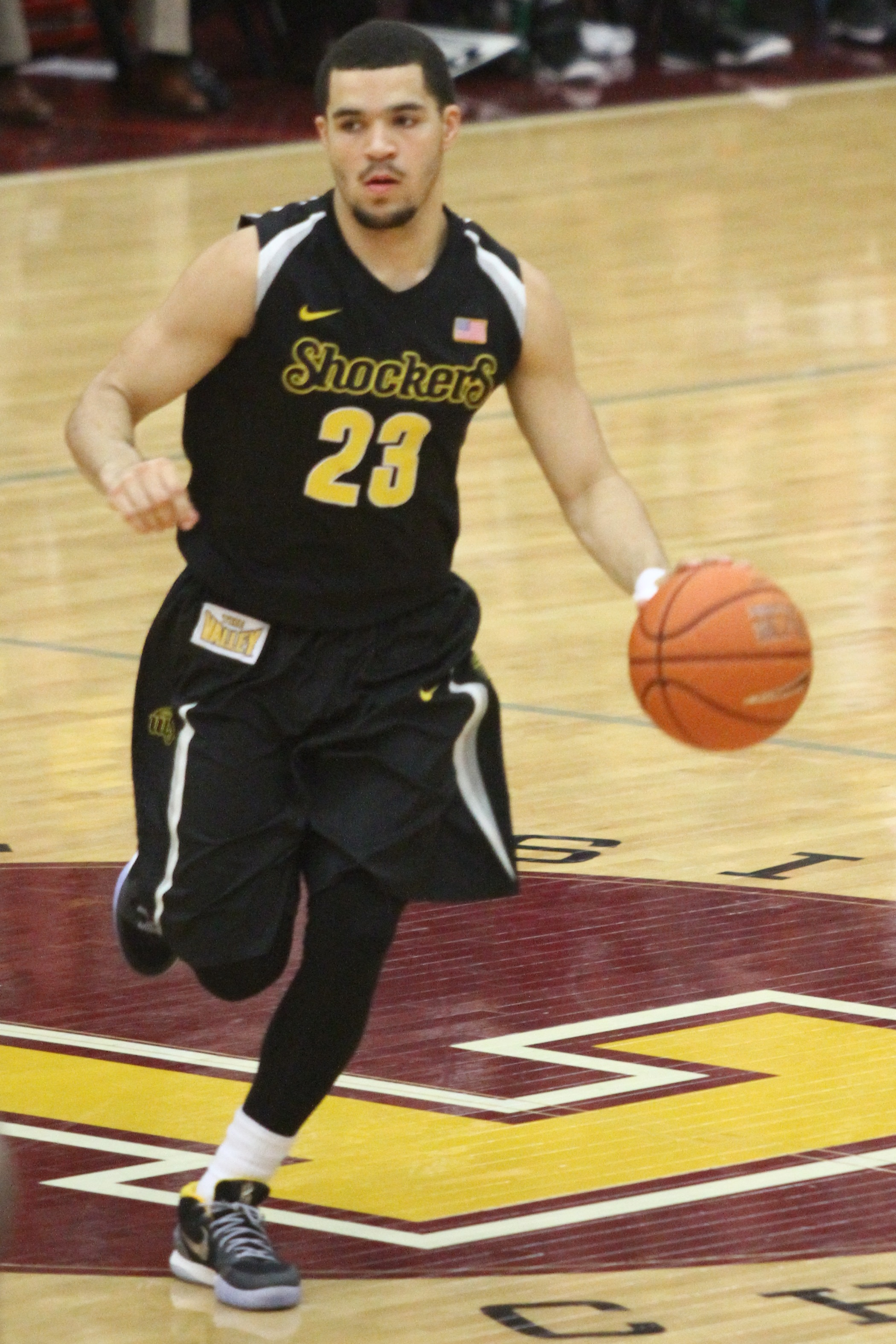
Fred VanVleet, the Shockers' all-time leader in assists and steals.

Rank	Assists	Player	Seasons
1	637	Fred VanVleet	2012–16
2	430	Toure' Murry	2008–12
3	429	Warren Armstrong	1965–68
4	420	Bob Trogele	1975–79
5	404	Cal Bruton	1972–76
6	394	Dave Stallworth	1962–65
7	384	Aubrey Sherrod	1981–85
8	383	Paul Gruffrovich	1987–91
9	345	Ron Baker	2012–16
10	336	Tony Martin	2008–12?

==== Blocked shots ====
Rank	Blocks	Player	Seasons
1	209	Antoine Carr	1979–83
2	152	Quincy Ballard	2022-25
3	132	Robert Elmore	1973–77
4	109	Claudius Johnson	1989–93
5	105	Gene Wiley	1959–62
6	103	Xavier McDaniel	1981–85
7	101	Garrett Stutz	2008–12
8	98	PJ Cousinard	2004–08
9	91	J. T. Durley	2007–11
9	91	Ehimen Orupke	2010–13
10	82	Terry Benton	1969–72
10	82	Carl Hall	2011–13

==== Steals ====
Rank	Steals	Player	Seasons
1	225	Fred VanVleet	2012–16
2	222	Jason Perez	1996–2000
3	180	Toure' Murry	2008–12
4	163	Ron Baker	2012–16
5	156	Tekele Cotton	2011–15
6	153	Jamar Howard	2001–05
7	148	Aubrey Sherrod	1981–85
7	148	PJ Cousinard	2004–08
9	126	Cheese Johnson	1975–79
10	114	Xavier McDaniel	1981–85
10	114	Paul Gruffrovich	1987–91

== Postseason history ==
=== NCAA tournament results ===
The Shockers have appeared in 16 NCAA Tournaments. Their combined record is 18–17.

Year	Seed	Round	Opponent	Result
1964	N/A	Second round Elite Eight	Creighton; Kansas State	W 84–68; L 93–94
1965	N/A	Second round Elite Eight; Final Four; Third-place game	SMU; Oklahoma State; UCLA; Princeton	W 86–81; W 54–46; L 98–108; L 82–118
1976	N/A	First round	Michigan	L 73–74
1981	No. 6	First round Second round Sweet Sixteen; Elite Eight	No. 11 Southern; No. 3 Iowa; No. 7 Kansas; No. 1 LSU	W 95–70; W 60–56; W 66–65; L 85–96
1985	No. 11	First round	No. 6 Georgia	L 59–67
1987	No. 11	First round	No. 6 St. John's	L 55–57
1988	No. 12	First round	No. 5 DePaul	L 62–83
2006	No. 7	First round Second round Sweet Sixteen	No. 10 Seton Hall; No. 2 Tennessee; No. 11 George Mason	W 86–66; W 80–73; L 55–63
2012	No. 5	Second round	No. 12 VCU	L 59–62
2013	No. 9	Second round Third round Sweet Sixteen; Elite Eight; Final Four	No. 8 Pittsburgh; No. 1 Gonzaga; No. 13 La Salle; No. 2 Ohio State; No. 1 Louisville	W 73–55; W 76–70; W 72–58; W 70–66; L 68–72
2014	No. 1	Second round Third round	No. 16 Cal Poly; No. 8 Kentucky	W 64–37; L 76–78
2015	No. 7	Second round Third round Sweet Sixteen	No. 10 Indiana; No. 2 Kansas; No. 3 Notre Dame	W 81–76; W 78–65; L 70–81
2016	No. 11	First Four; First round Second round	No. 11 Vanderbilt; No. 6 Arizona; No. 3 Miami (FL)	W 70–50; W 65–55; L 57–65
2017	No. 10	First round Second round	No. 7 Dayton; No. 2 Kentucky	W 64–58; L 62–65
2018	No. 4	First round	No. 13 Marshall	L 75–81
2021	No. 11	First Four	No. 11 Drake	L 52–53

*Following the introduction of the "First Four" round in 2011, the Round of 64 and Round of 32 were referred to as the second round and third round, respectively, from 2011 to 2015. Then from 2016 moving forward, the Round 64 and Round of 32 will be called the First and Second rounds, as they were prior to 2011.

=== NIT results ===
The Shockers have appeared in 15 National Invitation Tournaments. Their combined record is 13–14. They were NIT champions in 2011.

Year	Round	Opponent	Result
1954	First round	Bowling Green	L 64–88
1962	First round	Dayton	L 71–79
1963	Quarterfinals	Villanova	L 53–54
1966	Quarterfinals	NYU	L 84–90
1980	First round	UTEP	L 56–58
1984	First round	Michigan	L 70–94
1989	First round Second round	UC Santa Barbara; Michigan State	W 70–62; L 67–79
2003	Opening Round	Iowa State	L 65–76
2004	First round	Florida State	L 84–91
2005	Opening Round; First round Second round	Houston; Western Kentucky; Vanderbilt	W 85–69; W 84–81; L 63–65
2010	First round	Nevada	L 70–74
2011	First round Second round Quarterfinals; Semifinals; Championship	Nebraska; Virginia Tech; College of Charleston; Washington State; Alabama	W 76–49; W 79–76; W 82–75; W 75–44; W 66–57
2019	First round Second round Quarterfinals; Semifinals	Furman; Clemson; Indiana; Lipscomb	W 76–70; W 63–55; W 73–63; L 64–71
2025	First round	Oklahoma State	L 79–89
2026	First round Second round Quarterfinals	Wyoming; Oklahoma State; Tulsa	W 74–70; W 96–70; L 79–83

=== CBI results ===
The Shockers have appeared in one College Basketball Invitational. Their combined record is 1–1.

Year	Round	Opponent	Result
2009	First round Quarterfinals	Buffalo; Stanford	W 84–73; L 56–70

=== NAIA results ===
As Wichita University, the Shockers made two appearances in the NAIA tournament. Their combined record is 0-2

Year	Round	Opponent	Result
1945	First Round	West Texas State	L 43-54
1946	First Round	Culver-Stockton(MO)	L 51-55
