= Lynbert Johnson =

American basketball player

Personal information
- Born: September 7, 1957 (age 69) New York City, New York, U. S.
- Listed height: 6 ft 6 in (1.98 m)
- Listed weight: 195 lb (88 kg)

Career information
- High school: Haaren (Manhattan, New York)
- College: Wichita State (1975–1979)
- NBA draft: 1979: 3rd round, 54th overall pick
- Drafted by: Golden State Warriors
- Playing career: 1979–1980
- Position: Small forward
- Number: 21

Career history
- 1979–1980: Utica Olympics
- 1979–1980: Golden State Warriors
- 1980–1981: Rochester Zeniths

Career highlights
- 2× First-team All-MVC (1977, 1979); Second-team All-MVC (1978); Second-team Parade All-American (1975)
- Stats at NBA.com
- Stats at Basketball Reference

Lynbert R. Johnson (born September 7, 1957) is a retired American professional basketball player. He was selected in the 1979 NBA draft by the Golden State Warriors, playing nine games for them in the 1979–80 season, averaging 3.0 points and 1.6 rebounds per game. During his tenure at Wichita State University his nickname was 'Cheese' which was a name given to him by some of the older guys who watched him play at Rucker Park. Also, he would smile extremely wide when someone would fall while on the basketball court. Johnson was inducted into the Wichita State Shocker Sports Hall of Fame in 1986.

== Biography ==
Born in New York, New York, Johnson attended Haaren High School in Midtown Manhattan.

Johnson was the Missouri Valley Conference "Newcomer of the Year" in 1976 and was a first-team all-MVC selection in 1977 and 1979 and was a second-team pick in 1978. He led WSU in scoring for three years and in rebounding twice. Johnson ranked third at the time of his induction into the Hall in total career rebounds at WSU with 1,027. He also ranked fifth in total points scored with 1,907 and fifth in field goal percentage having made over 52 percent of his shots during his college career. His 17.3 career scoring average at WSU ranked him seventh all-time at the school at the time of his induction and his 9.3 per game rebound average was the school¹s tenth-best all-time total.

During his senior year, the 1978–79 season, he averaged 22.2 points per game.

In addition to his time with the Warriors, Johnson played two seasons in the Continental Basketball Association for the Utica Olympics (1979–80) and the Rochester Zeniths (1980–81).

== Career statistics ==
Legend
GP	Games played	GS	Games started	MPG	Minutes per game
FG%	Field goal percentage	3P%	3-point field goal percentage	FT%	Free throw percentage
RPG	Rebounds per game	APG	Assists per game	SPG	Steals per game
BPG	Blocks per game	PPG	Points per game	**Bold**	Career high

=== NBA ===
==== Regular season ====
Year	Team	GP	MPG	FG%	3P%	FT%	RPG	APG	SPG	BPG	PPG
1979–80	Golden State	9	5.9	.400	–	.600	1.6	.2	.1	.0	3.0
