= Robert Elmore (basketball) =

American basketball player

Personal information
- Born: October 23, 1954 New York City, New York, U.S.
- Died: November 26, 1977 (aged 23) Rome, Italy
- Listed height: 6 ft 10 in (2.08 m)
- Listed weight: 245 lb (111 kg)

Career information
- High school: John Adams (Queens, New York)
- College: Wharton County JC (1972–1973); Wichita State (1973–1977)
- NBA draft: 1977: 4th round, 67th overall pick
- Drafted by: New Jersey Nets
- Playing career: 1977–1977
- Position: Center

Career history
- 1977: Lazio

Career highlights
- 3× First-team All-MVC (1975–1977); MVC Newcomer of the Year (1975)
- Stats at Basketball Reference

Robert Louis Elmore (October 23, 1954 – November 26, 1977) was an American professional basketball player. He played college basketball for the Wichita State Shockers and was a fourth round selection by the New Jersey Nets in the 1977 NBA draft. Elmore began his professional career in Italy where he died of drug induced circulatory failure during his rookie season.

== Early life ==
Elmore lived in housing projects in Brooklyn until his family moved to a house in Jamaica, Queens, when he was nine. He was raised alongside his three siblings: brothers Len and Cliff, and sister Laverne. Elmore's first passion was baseball but he was encouraged to play basketball in high school because of his height. He was known as "Big Mo" to his friends.

Elmore was involved with what he described as "kid gangs" while growing up in Queens. When he was around 14, he made the decision to leave his friends to focus on basketball. Elmore's father wanted him to attend Power Memorial Academy in Manhattan where his brother Len was emerging as a basketball player but Elmore decided to stay in Queens where he attended John Adams High School. He was ineligible to play on the school basketball team during his first two years because of his academics. Elmore debuted during his senior year when he averaged 16 points and 13 rebounds per game. He was again declared academically ineligible for the final two games of the season.

Elmore did not graduate from high school and received his high school equivalency at Jamaica Vocational School.

== College career ==
Elmore enrolled at Wharton County Junior College where he played basketball and averaged 16 points and 12 rebounds per game. Elmore was contacted by Wichita State Shockers head coach Harry Miller who offered him a scholarship.

Elmore broke his foot two games into his first year with the Shockers and missed the rest of the 1973–74 season. He returned to be named as the MVC Newcomer of the Year in 1975 and was a three-time All-Missouri Valley Conference (MVC) first-team selection from 1975 to 1977. He led the MVC in rebounding all three seasons he played. Elmore was the first Shockers player to record more than 1,000 points and 1,000 rebounds. His career totals of 1,039 rebounds and 132 blocks both rank second in Shockers program history.

Elmore was inducted into the Wichita State Shocker Sports Hall of Fame in 2014.

== Professional career ==
Elmore was selected by the New Jersey Nets as the first pick of the fourth round in the 1977 NBA draft. He reacted to his drafting: "I was kind of surprised. But they need a center." On July 24, Elmore signed a multi-year deal with the Nets. During a Nets practice session in September, Elmore "showed astounding lack of physical conditioning" and Nets head coach Kevin Loughery remarked that he "has probably never really been in shape in his life." On October 10, Elmore was waived by the Nets.

On October 12, 1977, Elmore signed with Lazio Eldorado in Italy; his contract was for $30,000 a year. His Lazio teammate, Abdul Jeelani, remarked that Elmore was "kind of disappointed that he hadn't made the Nets." Elmore played in six games with Lazio and scored 115 points; he ranked third in the league in blocks and fourth in rebounds. Lazio head coach, Giancarlo Asteo, called Elmore "a great player with a great personality."

== Death ==
Elmore shared an apartment in Rome with his teammate Jeelani until two weeks before his death when Jeelani's wife arrived and they moved into their own apartment. Asteo remarked that Elmore was "obviously alone" during his time in Rome and "especially when [Jeelani] left."

On November 26, 1977, Elmore was found dead in his Rome apartment. Lazio's general manager, de Micheli, had been unable to contact Elmore by phone throughout the day; the general manager visited Elmore's apartment where he received no answer. de Micheli and the building's night porter entered Elmore's apartment by smashing the balcony window. Elmore was discovered slumped in an armchair in front of a television. On the floor next to the chair were several grams of hashish, a syringe containing a yellow liquid, and heroin in both powdered and hardened form.

An autopsy performed by an investigating judge declared that Elmore died of "a massive circulatory failure due to the presence of heroin in the system." The heroin dose was powerful enough to kill him outright. A second autopsy and the findings of a police investigation were not released. Elmore was not a regular user of drugs and the fatal needle mark that was found on his arm was the only one located. His friends were adamant that Elmore had not committed suicide.

Elmore had written earlier to his brother, Cliff, that he had met a local black woman who was a dealer of hashish and cocaine. When Cliff and his father arrived in Rome to return Elmore's body, they tracked down the woman who offered them a jar with cocaine and flashed a purse filled with money during their meeting. Cliff believed that she had intended to display that she had no need for Elmore's finances nor had any role in foul play.

On November 27, Lazio observed a minute of silence before their game against Pintinox in memory of Elmore.

Elmore was one of three American basketball players to die in Europe during a 13-month span alongside Fessor Leonard in Switzerland and Steve Mitchell in Italy.

== See also ==
- List of basketball players who died during their careers
