= Jamar Howard =

American basketball player

Personal information
- Born: January 8, 1983 (age 43) Shawnee Mission, Kansas
- Listed height: 6 ft 5 in (1.96 m)
- Listed weight: 208 lb (94 kg)

Career information
- High school: Bishop Miege (Roeland Park, Kansas)
- College: Wichita State (2001–2005)
- NBA draft: 2005: undrafted
- Playing career: 2005–2009
- Position: Forward

Career history
- 2005–2006: San Jose Skyrockets
- 2006–2007: Great Falls Explorers
- 2007: Dodge City Legend
- 2007–2008: VPV Giants Noerdlingen
- 2008–2009: Bayern Munich

Career highlights
- All-CBA Second Team (2007)

Jamar Howard (born January 8, 1983) is an American former professional basketball player. After a few years in lower American leagues, he decided to travel to Europe, where he began to achieve some good exhibitions for teams in Germany.

Howard played for the Great Falls Explorers of the Continental Basketball Association (CBA) during the 2006–07 season and earned All-CBA Second Team honors.

== Achievements ==
=== Club ===
- 2005/06: San Jose Skyrockets – ABA Red Conference Champion
- 2007/08: VPV Giants Noerdlingen – German Pro A Champion

=== Individual ===
Wichita State University Men's Basketball (2001–05) Named first team all-Missouri Valley Conference in 2002–03 and 2003–04 and to the second team in 2004–05...MVC Defensive Player of the Year in 2002–03...Four-time MVC All-Defensive team...Named to the MVC All-Freshman team...As a junior in 2003–04, was runner-up for MVC Player of the Year honors...Named the Wichita Eagle Most Valuable Player in 2003 and 2004...Earned the Shocker Radio Outstanding Defensive Player award in 2002, 2003, 2004 and 2005...Earned the Xavier McDaniel Rebounding Award in 2003, 2004 and 2005...Led the team in both steals and field goal percentage four times and still ranks second all-time in both free throws made (505) and attempted (746)...Finished career with 1,571 points, 711 rebounds, 263 assists, 153 steals and 88 blocks and averaged 12.7 points per game...Helped turn around a struggling program with three NIT bids, WSU's first postseason appearances in 14 years.

- 2006/07: Great Falls Explorers – CBA All-Star Game
- 2007: Dodge City Legend – USBL All-Defensive Team

January 2020 – Inducted into the Wichita State University Sports Hall of Fame.
