= List of Wichita State University people =

The following is a list of notable people associated with Wichita State University, located in the American city of Wichita, Kansas.

== University presidents ==
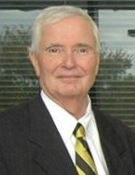
John Bardo, 13th president of WSU

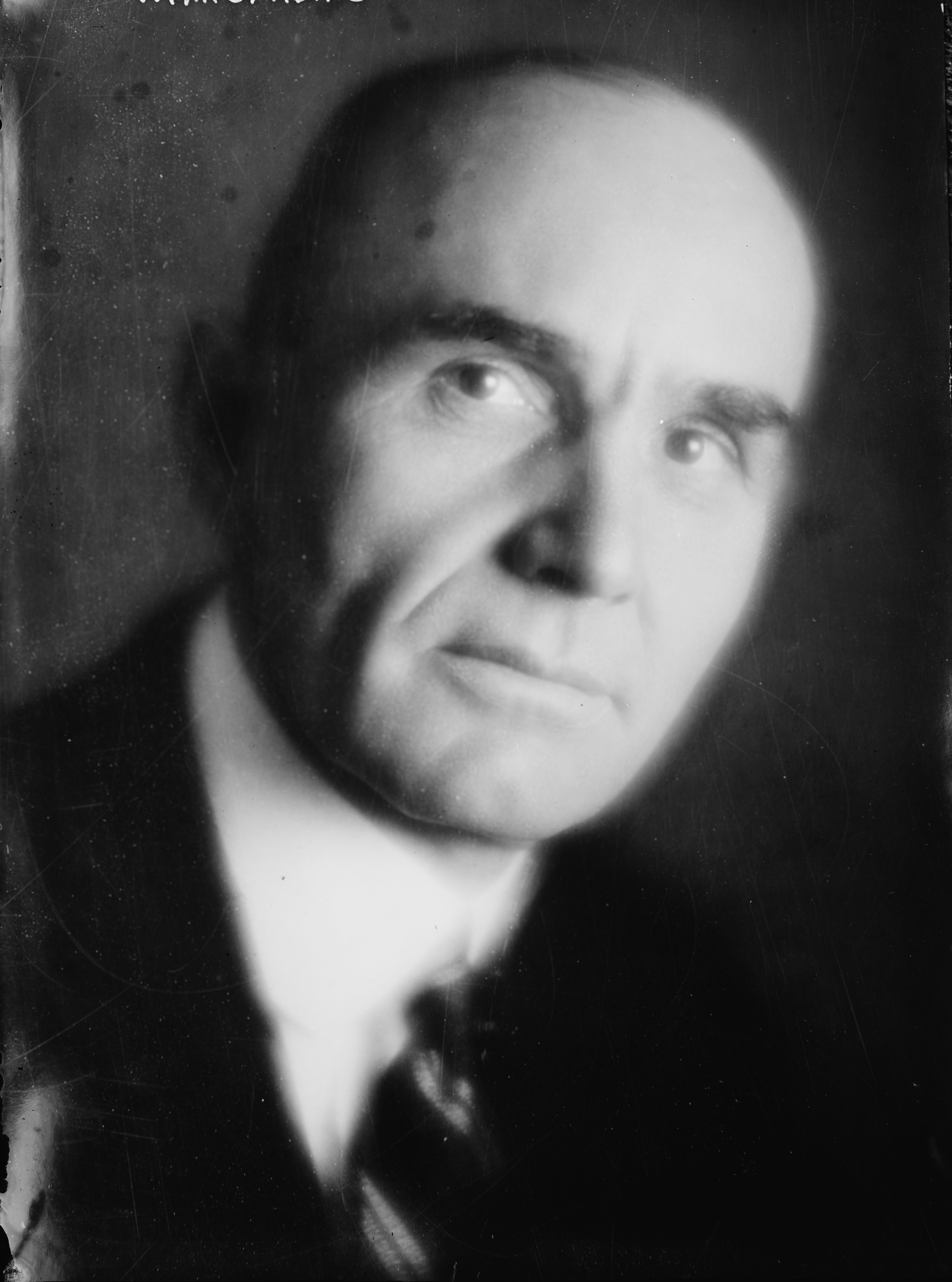
William M. Jardine , 6th president of WSU

Fairmount College

- Nathan J. Morrison, 1895–1907
- Henry Thayer, 1907–1914
- Walter Rollins, 1914–1922
- John D. Finlayson, 1922–1927

Municipal University of Wichita (WU)

- Harold Foght, 1927–1934
- William M. Jardine, 1934–1949, previously professor/dean (1910–1918) and president (1918–1925) of Kansas State University, U.S. secretary of agriculture (1925–1929), and U.S. minister to Egypt (1930–1933)
- Harry F. Corbin, 1949–1963, previously associate professor of Political Science at WU

Wichita State University (WSU)

- Emory K. Lindquist, 1963–1968, Rhodes Scholar, historian, president of Bethany College
- Clark D. Ahlberg, 1968–1983
- Warren B. Armstrong, 1983–1993
- Eugene M. Hughes, 1993–1998
- Donald L. Beggs, 1999–2012, president/chancellor of Southern Illinois University
- John W. Bardo, 2012–2019, chancellor of Western Carolina University, responsible for major building expansion at WSU
- Jay S. Golden, 2020–2020, vice chancellor of Research, East Carolina University
- Richard Muma, 2021–present, served as interim president from September 2020 until he became president on May 6, 2021

== Academia ==
- Dale Allison – biblical scholar, professor at Pittsburgh Theological Seminary
- M. Lee Pelton – current president of Emerson College
- Earl G. Yarbrough – former president of Savannah State University

== Business ==
- Jim Bede – founder of Bede Aviation
- Gary Burrell – founder and CEO of Garmin
- Dan and Frank Carney – co-founders of Pizza Hut
- Vivek Lall – CEO of Reliance Industries
- Phil Ruffin – billionaire businessman, owns Treasure Island Hotel and Casino and Circus Circus Hotel & Casino in Las Vegas, attended WSU
- T. Russell Shields – technology entrepreneur, former CEO of Navteq
- Dwane Wallace – former CEO and chairman of Cessna

== Government ==
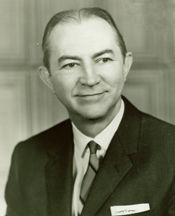
Garner Shriver

- Valerie Baldwin – Assistant Secretary of the Army (Financial Management and Comptroller), 2004–2006
- Robert Blackwill – diplomat, senior fellow at the Council of Foreign Relations, lobbyist, author
- Stanley Thomas Counts – United States Navy rear admiral
- Rebecca Ediger – US Secret Service agent
- Jeff Longwell – 102nd mayor of Wichita, Kansas
- Walter Orebaugh – foreign service officer
- Femi Pedro – deputy governor of Lagos State, Nigeria
- Riley Pitts – US Army soldier, first African-American commissioned officer to be awarded the Congressional Medal of Honor
- Tom Sawyer – member of the Kansas House of Representatives, former House majority leader, 1998 Kansas Democratic Party nominee for governor
- Matt Schlapp – political activist, lobbyist, and chairman of American Conservative Union
- Garner Shriver – eight-term U.S. representative from Kansas
- Sandiaga Uno – Minister of Tourism and Creative Economy of Indonesia, previously deputy governor of Jakarta, businessman
- Brandon Whipple – 103rd mayor of Wichita, Kansas
- Lily Wu – 104th mayor of Wichita, Kansas
- David Younger – member of the Kansas House of Representatives

== Literature ==
- Craig Blais – poet
- Paul Dickey – poet
- Omar Khalidi – author, Muslim scholar
- Michael McClure – poet, playwright, songwriter, and novelist
- Janet Peery – short story author and novelist
- Charles Plymell – poet, novelist, and small press publisher

== Media ==
- James Pringle Cook – Western landscape painter
- Erin Dagon-Mitchell – actress, director, playwright
- Shirley Knight – Oscar-nominated actress
- Lance LeGault – actor
- Bob Peak – painter dubbed the "father of the modern movie poster"
- Rosé – drag queen
- Kate Snodgrass – theatre director and playwright

== Music ==
- Chris Arpad – solo steel pannist
- James Billings – operatic baritone, opera librettist, and opera director
- Karla Burns – Drama Desk Award and Laurence Olivier Award-winning actress and operatic mezzo-soprano
- Joyce DiDonato – opera star
- Kevin Kastning – modern classical composer and guitarist
- Samuel Ramey – opera star
- Michael Sylvester – opera star
- Matt Wilson – jazz drummer

== Science and technology ==
- Lincoln LaPaz – astronomer at University of New Mexico, pioneer in the study of meteors
- Adisak Mekkittikul – computer engineer
- Harold G. White – mechanical engineer, aerospace engineer, and applied physicist; Advanced Propulsion team lead for the NASA Engineering Directorate

== Sports ==
=== Sportscasting ===
- Gary Bender – sportscaster

=== Baseball ===
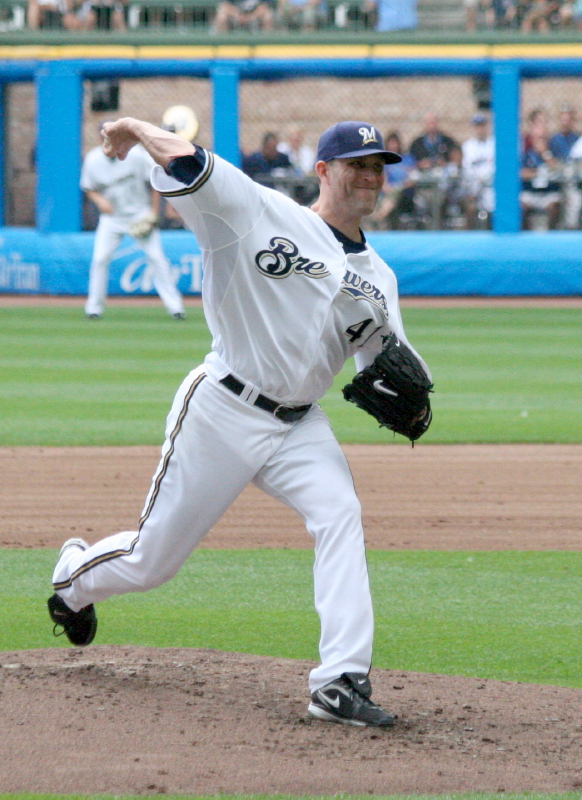
Braden Looper

- Casey Blake – Major League Baseball player
- Alec Bohm (born 1996) – baseball player in the Philadelphia Phillies
- Joe Carter – Major League Baseball player
- Andy Dirks – Major League Baseball player
- Darren Dreifort – Major League Baseball player with the Los Angeles Dodgers
- Conor Gillaspie – Major League Baseball player for the Chicago White Sox
- Koyie Hill – Major League Baseball player
- Mike Lansing – Major League Baseball player
- Don Lock – Major League Baseball player with the Washington Senators
- Braden Looper – Major League Baseball player for the Milwaukee Brewers and Saint Louis Cardinals
- Pat Meares – Major League Baseball player
- Doug Mirabelli – Major League Baseball player with the Boston Red Sox
- Charlie O'Brien – Major League Baseball player
- Michael Pelfrey – Major League Baseball player for the New York Mets
- Nate Robertson – Major League Baseball player for the Florida Marlins
- Phil Stephenson – former Major League Baseball first baseman, head baseball coach for Dodge City Community College
- Eric Wedge – managed Major League Baseball's Seattle Mariners, head baseball coach at WSU

=== Basketball ===
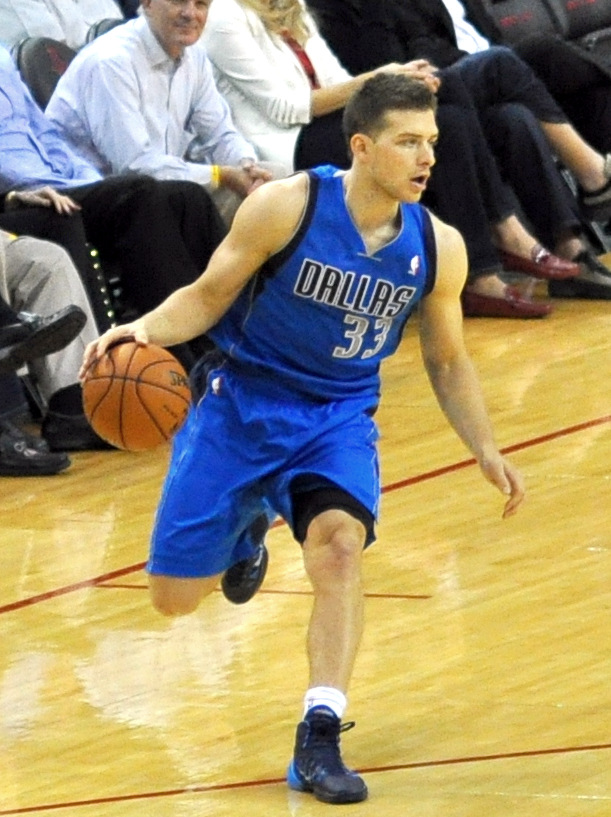
Gal Mekel

- Jamie Arnold (born 1975) – American-Israeli professional basketball player
- Ron Baker – NBA player with the New York Knicks
- Nate Bowman – known as "The Snake"; National Basketball Association player
- Cal Bruton – American-Australian basketball player, NBL Hall of Famer
- Antoine Carr (born 1961) – NBA player
- John Cooper – head coach at Tennessee State University, assistant coach at Auburn University, University of Oregon, and University of South Carolina
- Cleanthony Early – NBA player most recently with the New York Knicks
- Qua Grant (born 1999) – basketball player in the Israeli Basketball Premier League
- Warren Jabali – American Basketball Association player
- Cliff Levingston – NBA player
- Cleo Littleton – First-team All-MVC (1952–5) and AP honorable mention All-American (1954-5)
- Sabrina Lozada-Cabbage – Olympic basketball player
- Xavier McDaniel – NBA player
- Markis McDuffie (born 1997) – basketball player for Maccabi Ashdod in the Israeli Basketball Premier League
- Gal Mekel (born 1988) – Israeli basketball player formerly in the NBA and now with Maccabi Tel Aviv
- Toure' Murry – NBA player most recently with the Utah Jazz
- Joe Ragland (born 1989) – American-Liberian basketball player for Hapoel Holon of the Israeli Basketball Premier League
- Landry Shamet (born 1997) – NBA player with the New York Knicks
- Grant Sherfield (born 1999) – basketball player in the Israeli Basketball Premier League
- Dave Stallworth – NBA player
- Fred VanVleet – NBA player with the Houston Rockets
- Gene Wiley – NBA player

=== Bowling ===
- Chris Barnes – PBA bowler (2007–08 PBA Player of the Year), USBC spokesperson
- Clara Guerrero – PWBA bowler
- Francois Lavoie – PBA bowler
- Sean Rash – PBA bowler
- Rocio Restrepo – PWBA bowler

=== Football ===
- Margene Adkins – NFL player for Dallas Cowboys, New Orleans Saints and New York Jets
- Sam Adkins – NFL player for Seattle Seahawks, 1977–81; television personality for Seahawks broadcasts
- Jim Bausch – running back, All-American and member of College Football Hall of Fame (also Olympic Decathlon champion, 1932) 1927, then transferred to University of Kansas
- Jumpy Geathers – defensive tackle, played for the New Orleans Saints, Washington Redskins, Atlanta Falcons, and Denver Broncos, won two Super Bowls
- Randy Jackson – NFL player, 1972–74; survivor of the 1970 WSU football team plane crash; coached at Robinson Middle School in Wichita
- Bob Long – receiver for Green Bay Packers, Atlanta Falcons, Washington Redskins and Los Angeles Rams; three-time NFL champion (1965, 1966, 1967)
- Scot McCloughan – general manager of the Washington Redskins
- Bill Parcells – Pro Football Hall of Fame coach, played linebacker at WSU
- Henry Schichtle – NFL and CFL player
- Nelson Toburen – linebacker for the Green Bay Packers; two-time NFL champion (1961, 1962)

=== Wrestling ===
- Paul Wight – professional wrestler known as "The Big Show", played basketball at WSU

== Crime ==
- Eyad Ismoil – a perpetrator of the 1993 World Trade Center bombing
- Dennis Rader – BTK serial killer

== See also ==
- Lists of people from Kansas
