= Lounsbury =

Lounsbury, also written Lounsbery or Lounsberry is a surname, and may refer to any one of the following:

- Arthur Lounsbery (born 19??), Japanese voice actor
- Dan Lounsbury, American former college football coach
- Ebenezer Lounsbery (c. 1787–1868), New York politician
- Floyd Lounsbury (1914–1998), American linguist and anthropologist
- George E. Lounsbury (1838–1904), Governor of Connecticut
- Hewitt Lounsbury (ca. 1911–1971), Mayor of Anchorage, Alaska
- Jim Lounsbury (1923–2006), American musician
- John Lounsbery (1911–1976), American cartoon animator
- Michael Lounsbury (born 1966), American organizational theorist
- Monica Lounsbery, American academic administrator
- Phineas C. Lounsbury (1841–1925), Governor of Connecticut
- Richard Lounsbery (1882–1967), American businessman
- Robert H. Lounsberry (1918–2001), Iowa politician
- Rose Lounsbury, American author and politician
- Thomas Lounsbury (1838–1915), American literary historian and critic
- William Lounsbery (1831–1905), U.S. Congressman from New York

== See also ==
- Lounsberry, New York
- Lounsbury, one of the Neighbourhoods in North Bay, Ontario
- Lounsbury Foods
- Phineas Chapman Lounsbury House
- Richard Lounsbery Award
- Richard Lounsbery Foundation
