= Adisak =

Adisak (Thai: อดิศักดิ์) is a Thai given name. Notable people with the name include:

- Adisak Duangsri (born 1985), a.k.a. Ting, Thai footballer
- Adisak Ganu (born 1986), Thai footballer
- Adisak Hantes (born 1995), Thai footballer
- Adisak Klinkosoom (born 1993), Thai footballer
- Adisak Kraisorn (born 1991), Thai footballer
- Adisak Mekkittikul, Thai computer scientist
- Adisak Sensom-Eiad (born 1994), a.k.a. Max, Thai footballer
- Adisak Srikampang (born 1985), a.k.a. Ae, Thai football player and coach
