= John Bardo =

American academic (1948–2019)

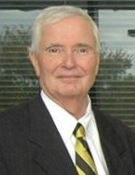

13th President of Wichita State University
- In office July 1, 2012 – March 12, 2019
- Preceded by: Donald L. Beggs
- Succeeded by: Jay Golden

10th Chancellor of Western Carolina University
- In office July 1, 1995 – June 30, 2011
- Preceded by: Myron L. Coulter
- Succeeded by: David O. Belcher

Personal details
- Born: John William Bardo; October 28, 1948 Cincinnati, Ohio, US
- Died: March 12, 2019 (aged 70) Wichita, Kansas, US
- Spouse: Deborah Davis (1974–2019)
- Children: 1
- Education: University of Cincinnati (BA); Ohio University (MA); Ohio State University (PhD)
- Profession: Professor

John William Bardo (October 28, 1948 – March 12, 2019) was an American educator and the 13th President of Wichita State University (WSU). Previously, Bardo was a faculty member at Western Carolina University (WCU) after serving as its 10th Chancellor for 16 years.

== Biography ==
=== Education ===
John grew up in Cincinnati, Ohio and graduated from Oak Hills High School. After high school, he attended the University of Cincinnati, where he graduated with a Bachelor of Arts in economics. After attending Cincinnati, Bardo graduated from Ohio University with a Master of Arts in sociology, followed by his doctorate at the Ohio State University.

=== Early career ===
In 1976, Bardo started his career at Wichita State University in the sociology department for five years, where he also won a Fulbright scholarship to study in Australia. In 1983, Bardo left Wichita State to become the Dean of Liberal Arts and Sciences at Southwest Texas State University (now Texas State). After serving at Southwest Texas State for three years, Bardo served as Provost and Vice President for Academic Affairs at two different institutions – the University of North Florida from 1986 to 1990 and Bridgewater State College from 1990 to 1993.

=== Western Carolina University ===
On July 1, 1995, Bardo began his 16-year tenure as the 10th Chancellor of Western Carolina University. During his tenure, enrollment grew almost twice the number from 1996, the campus grew with new buildings, and an honors college was established. Bardo resigned in 2011 to return to teaching. WCU named a building in his honor, the "John W Bardo Fine and Performing Arts Center".

=== Wichita State University ===
In April 2012, the Kansas Board of Regents selected Bardo as the 13th President of Wichita State University. Wichita State would name a building in his honor in 2017. John started his career at WSU from 1976 to 1983.

=== Death ===
John died on March 12, 2019, in Wichita after a chronic lung condition. His final resting place is Lakeview Cemetery in Wichita.
