= USS Bronstein (FF-1037) =

American ship commissioned in 1963

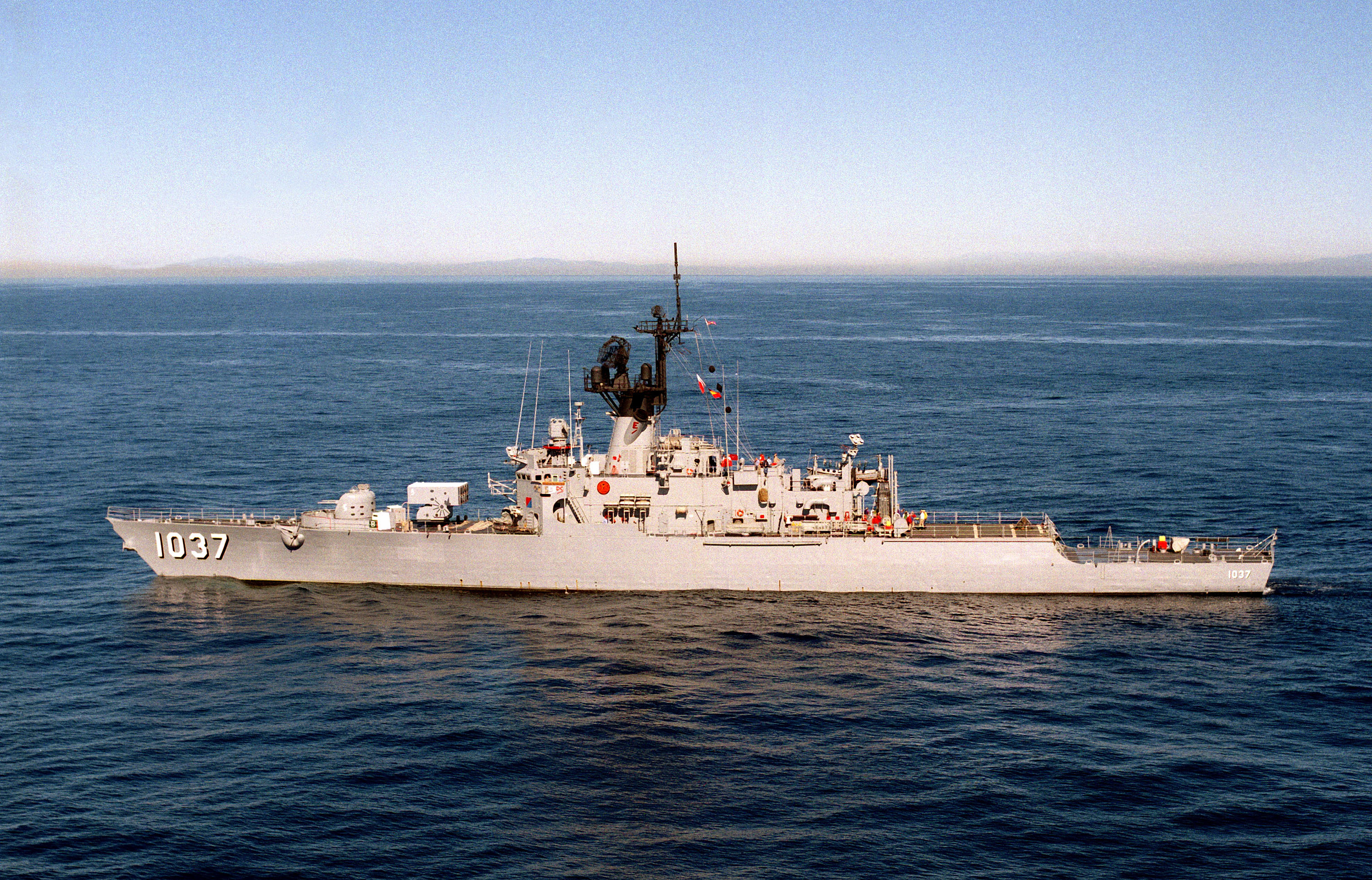
- USS Bronstein (FF-1037)

History

United States
- Name: Bronstein
- Namesake: Ben Richard Bronstein
- Builder: Avondale Shipyard, Inc., Westwego, Louisiana
- Laid down: 16 May 1961
- Launched: 31 March 1962
- Completed: 8 June 1963
- Commissioned: 16 June 1963
- Decommissioned: 13 December 1990
- Stricken: 4 October 1991
- Fate: Donated to Mexico, 12 November 1993

History

Mexico
- Name: ARM Hermenegildo Galeana (F202)
- Namesake: Hermenegildo Galeana
- Acquired: 12 November 1993
- Decommissioned: April 2017
- Status: decommissioned

General characteristics
- Class & type: Bronstein class frigate
- Displacement: approx. 2,650 tons full load
- Length: 371.4 ft (113.2 m)
- Beam: 40.4 ft (12.3 m)
- Draft: 23 ft (7.0 m)
- Propulsion: 2 Foster-Wheeler boilers; 1 Westinghouse geared turbine; 35,000shp; 1 shaft
- Speed: 26 knots
- Complement: 16 officers, 183 enlisted
- Sensors & processing systems: AN/SPS-10 surface search radar; AN/SPS-40 air search radar; AN/SPG-35 Gun fire control radar; AN/SQS-26 bow-mounted sonar; AN/SQR-15 towed sonar array
- Armament: one Mk-16 missile launcher for RUR-5 ASROC missiles; two Mk-33 3 in (76 mm) caliber guns (one mount); Mk 46 torpedoes from two Mk 32 triple tube mounts
- Aircraft carried: None / QH-50 DASH

USS Bronstein (FF-1037) was the lead ship of her class in the United States Navy. She was named in honor of Assistant Surgeon Ben Richard Bronstein, who was killed in action on 28 February 1942 when USS Jacob Jones (DD-130) was sunk by a German U-boat off Cape May, New Jersey.

Bronstein was commissioned on 16 June 1963 as DE-1037 under the command of Stanley Thomas Counts. She was decommissioned 13 December 1990 and struck from the Navy list on 4 October 1991.

Bronstein was disposed of through the Security Assistance Program as a foreign military sale on 12 November 1993. She was transferred to Mexico on 12 November 1993 where she served as ARM Hermenegildo Galeana (F202).
