= Richard Muma =

American academic and university president

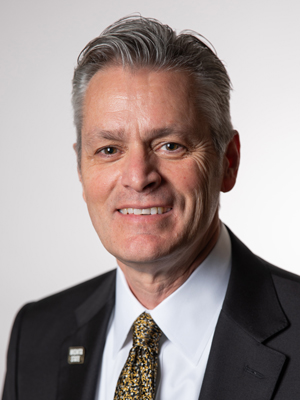
- Muma in 2025

15th President of Wichita State University
- Incumbent
- Assumed office May 6, 2021
- Preceded by: Jay Golden

Personal details
- Born: December 6, 1962 (age 63)
- Spouse: Rick Case
- Children: 2
- Education: University of Texas Medical Branch (BS); University of Texas Health Science Center at Houston (MPH); University of Missouri-St. Louis (PhD)

Academic background
- Thesis: Use of Mintzberg's model of managerial roles as a framework to describe a population of academic health profession administrators (2004)
- Doctoral advisor: Patricia Somers

Academic work
- Discipline: Education
- Institutions: Wichita State University

Richard D. Muma (born December 6, 1962) is an American academic, physician assistant and president of Wichita State University. He was named Wichita State University president by the Kansas Board of Regents in May 2021 after serving in an interim role following the departure of Jay Golden in September 2020. Muma is the first physician assistant to be named president of a university, and he is the first openly gay president of Wichita State.

== Initiatives ==
Major university initiatives forwarded during Muma's presidency include:

- Began construction on Phase I of the Wichita Biomedical Campus, a joint project between Wichita State University and the University of Kansas to create an academic health science center that fosters job creation, collaboration, research, and interprofessional learning. Once complete, the campus will combine WSU’s College of Health Professions programs, including its Speech-Language-Hearing Clinic, WSU Tech’s health care program and the Wichita campuses of KU School of Medicine and KU School of Pharmacy — all into one location.
- Launched the Student Success and Persistence initiative, a university-wide effort to improve persistence and graduation rates.
- Created the Shocker Success Center, a renovated facility opened in fall 2024 that centralizes 19 student support services in a single building.
- Launched the Marcus Welcome Center — Milly Marcus Annex, which brings together the Office of Admissions and Shocker Career Accelerator career services.
- Continued year-over-year enrollment growth to over 25,000 students between Wichita State and its affiliate WSU Tech.
- Grew research and development expenditures to more than $392 million, up from $192 million in 2021.
- Opened an on-campus ATF Crime Gun Intelligence Center of Excellence and a forensics lab in partnership with the Bureau of Alcohol, Tobacco, Firearms and Explosives.
- Opened the Digital Research and Transformation Hub, which works with strategic partners to facilitate digital transformation research.
- Opened the Hub for Advanced Manufacturing Research facility to help small companies adopt smart and advanced manufacturing processes into their businesses.
- Began work to develop University Village, which is intended to connect the Shocker neighborhoods surrounding WSU with needed services.
- Achieved Emerging Hispanic Serving Institution status for the university from the Hispanic Association of Colleges and Universities (HACU).
- Added Wichita State University to the Age-Friendly University Global Network, indicating a commitment to meeting the personal, educational, and career needs of adults of all ages and to create on-campus age-inclusive environments.
- Broke ground on a $17.5 million renovation of Wilkins Stadium (softball stadium).
- Broke ground on a significant renovation of University Stadium, formerly known as Cessna Stadium and home to Wichita State's track and field program.

== Awards and Honors ==
- Inaugural EAB Change Maker Award (2025)
- 2024 Donald A. Wilson Visionary Award from the Kansas Hospital Association.
- 2023 Sedgwick County Commission Chairman’s Award, for the Wichita Biomedical Campus Vision
- 2022 Person of the Year from the Wichita Branch of the National Association for the Advancement of Colored People (NAACP).
- 2022 Distinguished Alumni from The University of Texas Medical Branch at Galveston.
- 2007 Distinguished Fellow from American Academy of Physician Assistants .
