= USS Towers =

Charles F. Adams-class destroyer

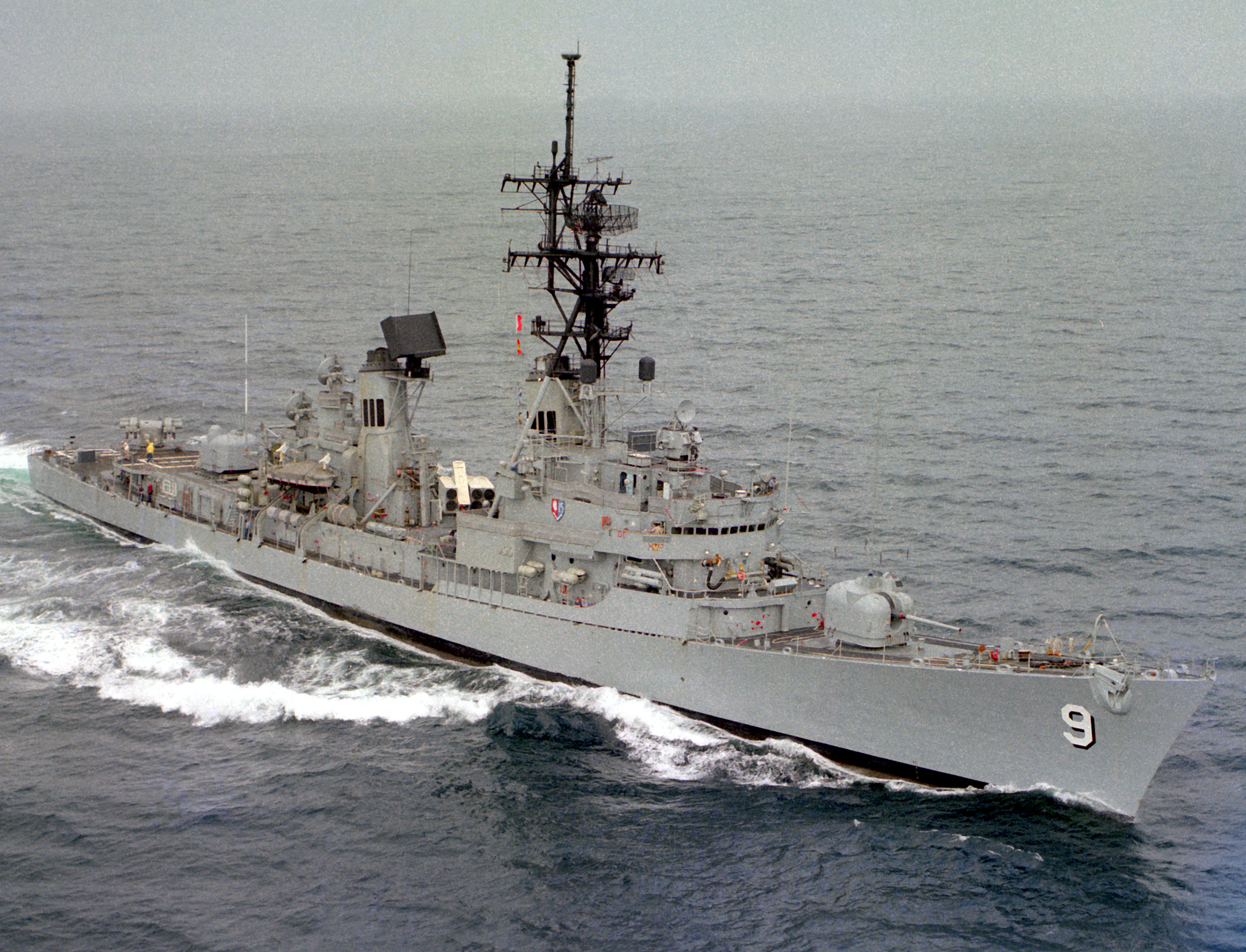
- USS Towers underway on 1 August 1982

History

United States
- Name: Towers
- Namesake: John Henry Towers
- Ordered: 28 March 1957
- Builder: Todd Pacific Shipyards
- Laid down: 1 April 1958
- Launched: 23 April 1959
- Acquired: 31 May 1961
- Commissioned: 6 June 1961
- Decommissioned: 1 October 1990
- Reclassified: DDG-9, 23 April 1957
- Stricken: 27 May 1992
- Identification: Callsign: NISS; Hull number: DD-959
- Fate: Sunk as target, 9 October 2002

General characteristics
- Class & type: Charles F. Adams-class destroyer
- Displacement: 3,277 tons standard, 4,526 full load
- Length: 437 ft (133 m)
- Beam: 47 ft (14 m)
- Draft: 15 ft (4.6 m)
- Propulsion: 2 × Westinghouse steam turbines providing 70,000 shp (52 MW); 2 shafts; 4 × Foster-Wheeler 1,275 psi (8,790 kPa) boilers
- Speed: 33 knots (61 km/h; 38 mph)
- Range: 4,500 nautical miles (8,300 km) at 20 knots (37 km/h)
- Complement: 354 (24 officers, 330 enlisted)
- Sensors & processing systems: AN/SPS-39 3D air search radar; AN/SPS-10 surface search radar; AN/SPG-51 missile fire control radar; AN/SPG-53 gunfire control radar; AN/SQS-23 Sonar and the hull mounted SQQ-23 Pair Sonar for DDG-2 through 19; AN/SPS-40 Air Search Radar; Naval Tactical Data System
- Armament: 1 Mk 11 missile launcher (DDG2-14) or Mk 13 single arm missile launcher (DDG-15-24) for RIM-24 Tartar SAM system, or later the RIM-66 Standard (SM-1) and Harpoon antiship missile; 2 × 5"/54 caliber Mark 42 (127 mm) gun; 1 × RUR-5 ASROC Launcher; 6 × 12.8 in (324 mm) ASW Torpedo Tubes (2 x Mark 32 Surface Vessel Torpedo Tubes)

USS Towers (DD-959/DDG-9) was a Charles F. Adams-class guided missile destroyer of the United States Navy notable for action in the Vietnam War. The ship was named in honor of Admiral John Henry Towers.

== Construction and career ==
Towers keel was laid down on 1 April 1958 at Seattle, Washington, by the Todd Pacific Shipyards; launched on 23 April 1959; sponsored by Mrs. Nathaniel Rotoreau Jr.; and commissioned on 6 June 1961 at the Puget Sound Naval Shipyard, Bremerton, Washington.

=== 1960s ===
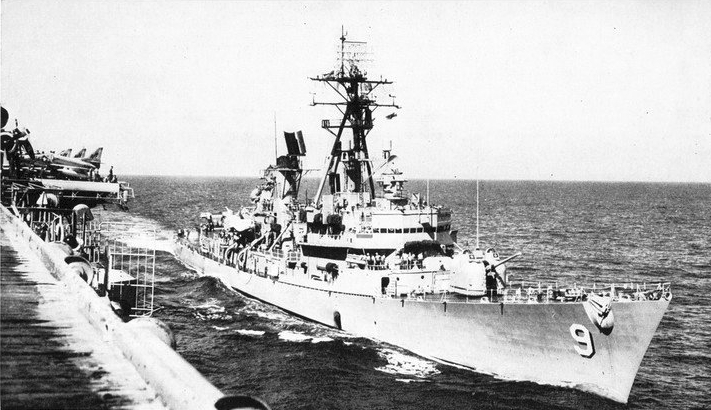
Towers underway in 1962

Homeported at San Diego, California, Towers carried out trials and local operations off the southern California coast into September 1961. She then conducted her shakedown cruise to Callao and Lima, Peru; Balboa, Panama Canal Zone; and Acapulco, Mexico, before she deployed to the Western Pacific (WestPac) for the first time in the early spring of 1962.

She arrived at Sydney, Australia, on 30 April to represent the United States during the 20th observance of the anniversary of the Battle of the Coral Sea and shifted to Melbourne a week later. She then continued her WestPac deployment with visits to Yokosuka and Sasebo, Japan; Buckner Bay, Okinawa; Subic Bay, Philippines; Keelung, Taiwan; and Bangkok, Thailand. She then returned home via Guam and Hawaii.

Following a routine schedule of local operations out of San Diego from 1 January to 17 May 1963, Towers departed her home port on 18 May, bound for the Far East. En route, she stopped at Pearl Harbor and Midway and later took part in exercises and operations off Japan and in the Philippines. She returned to San Diego on 28 November 1963 and operated along the southern California coast. May '64 Towers entered dry dock at Hunters Point, San Francisco for a five-month overhaul. Returning to duty in early October she went through weeks of shakedown exercises prior to returning to her home port of San Diego.

Towers departed San Diego on 5 January 1965, bound for her third WestPac tour. As American forces became increasingly involved in the Vietnam War, escalating from an advisory capacity to active combat, the Navy's role in Vietnamese coastal waters expanded. Towers participated in three main facets of the U.S. 7th Fleet's operations in the Gulf of Tonkin and the South China Sea. She performed screening and plane-guard duties for fast carrier task forces on Yankee Station, providing protection with her missiles and her rapid-fire 5-inch battery. In addition, she conducted search and rescue (SAR) patrols on the northern station; and made interdiction patrols in conjunction with Operation Market Time. Upon the conclusion of this tour, the guided missile destroyer sailed for home on 10 May. En route to the Hawaiian Islands, she participated in Operation Sailor Hat, a special blast test to determine deficiencies in modern ship construction, and arrived home at San Diego on 26 June.

From 31 January to 6 February 1966, Towers participated in Operation Buttonhook, a joint United States and Canadian exercise off the west coast of Canada and the United States which emphasized antisubmarine warfare (ASW) techniques. Following availability at the Long Beach Naval Shipyard during March, Towers took part in Operation Gray Ghost from 12 to 22 April. This exercise dealt with air control intercept tactics and anti-aircraft warfare (AAA) measures to prepare the ship for her upcoming deployment to the Gulf of Tonkin. In addition, the ship trained to become proficient in tactics to utilize against possible PT boat attacks.

Departing San Diego on 4 June 1966, Towers steamed west, via Pearl Harbor, Guam, and Subic Bay, to Vietnam. She expended some 3,266 rounds of 5-inch ammunition between 2 and 17 July, off target areas including the Rung Sat Special Zone. Her target assessment included the destruction of 17 enemy buildings and damage to 118 more, the sinking of three sampans, the killing of 11 Viet Cong soldiers, and the destruction of a bridge. The guided missile destroyer returned to Subic Bay for upkeep and further training in PT-boat countermeasures before she returned to the Gulf of Tonkin to take up her position on the northern SAR station on 1 August. For the next month, under the command of Stanley Thomas Counts, she deployed with USS Wiltsie (DD-716), keeping on the alert to spot downed pilots and to direct friendly helicopters to the rescue.

On 6 August 1966, Towers directed an HU-16 helicopter to the site of a downed aviator some 69 miles from the ship. The next day, Towers directed another HU-16 to a spot behind the enemy-held island of Cat Ba, where two Air Force men had bailed out. The helicopter successfully rescued them from behind communist lines. In the next two weeks, the ship participated in two more rescues—picking up two more Air Force pilots in one and a Navy flyer in the other.

Towers' most daring rescue came on the last day of her tour on the SARA station. On 31 August 1966, a Navy plane was hit by antiaircraft fire over Haiphong, and the pilot bailed out of his doomed aircraft directly over the enemy harbor. As he floated down under his parachute to face what seemed certain capture, Towers and King closed to within visual range of Haiphong harbor. Then King's helicopter sped in under the guidance of Towers experienced controllers and picked up the pilot, whisking him out of danger from beneath the enemy's very nose.

After a brief rest and recreation period, Towers returned to the SAR station again on 1 October 1966. However, flying weather turned out to be poorer at this time of year, and air operations were sharply curtailed. Hence, Towers spent much of her time patrolling the Gulf of Tonkin.

Sailing for home on 21 November 1966, Towers departed Yokosuka and ran into heavy seas while en route to the west coast, suffering minor storm damage before she arrived at her home port on 3 December. After operations at sea from January 1967 to mid-March, Towers underwent a major overhaul at Hunters' Point Naval Shipyard from 14 April to 19 October. The guided missile destroyer then operated out of San Diego through the spring of 1968.

Towers then readied herself for her next WestPac deployment. Her preparation included screening and shore bombardment exercises with New Jersey, the world's only active battleship. Departing San Diego on 5 September 1968, Towers made stops at Pearl Harbor and Subic Bay before arriving off the I Corps tactical zone to commence "Sea Dragon" operations.

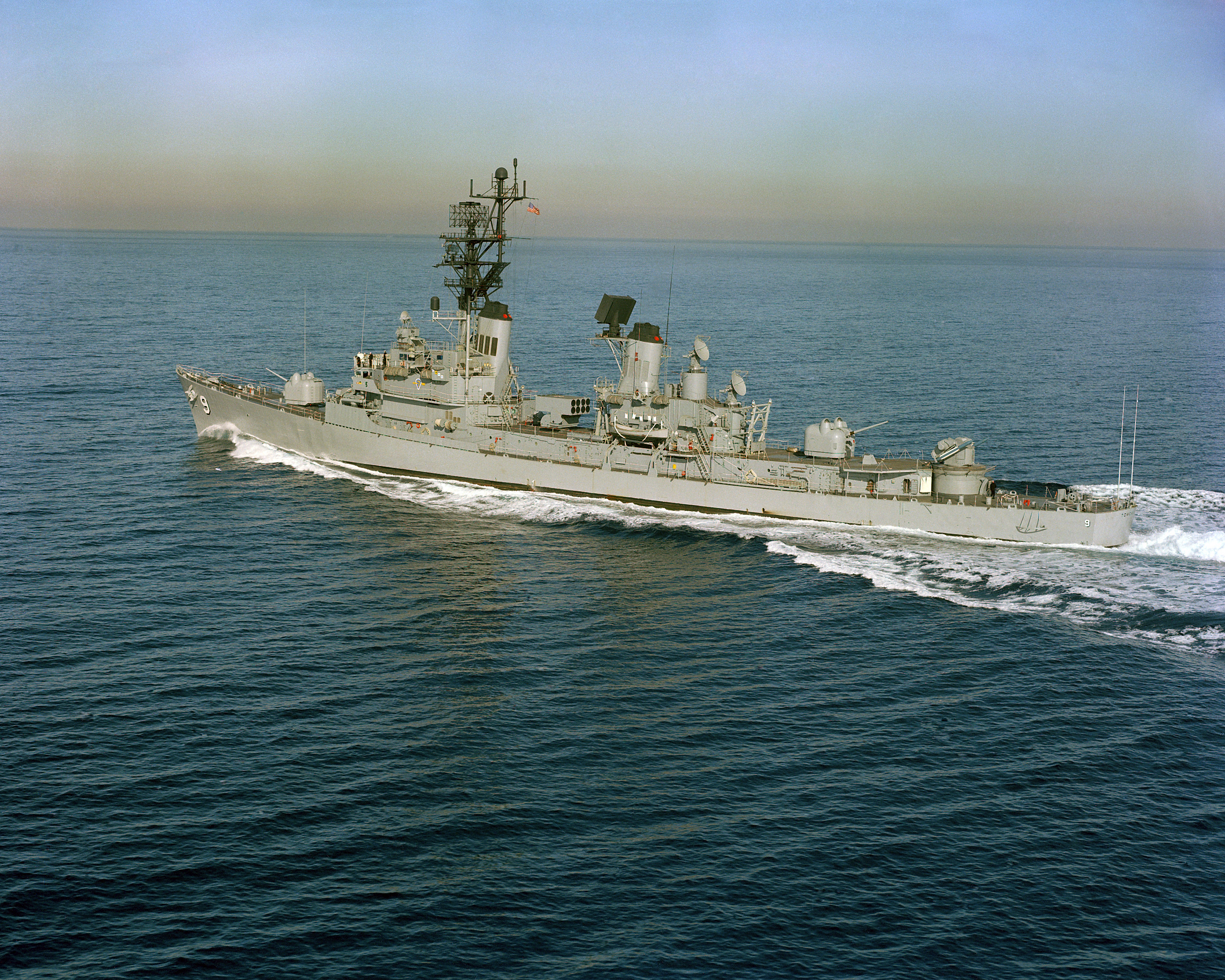
Towers underway off the coast of San Diego on 16 January 1968

While escorting and screening New Jersey, Towers knocked out two artillery and three antiaircraft gun sites; destroyed 55 meters of trenches; sank two logistics craft; set off 19 secondary explosions; and killed an estimated 10 enemy soldiers. On 1 October 1968, the ship rescued two downed airmen just south of the demilitarized zone (DMZ). The flyers, Capt. James Spaith, USMC, and his observer, 1st Lt. U.S. Grant, USMC, had been shot down when their Douglas A4F "Skyhawk" had been hit while spotting gunfire for New Jersey.

Following upkeep at Subic Bay, she planeguarded on "Yankee Station" for USS Constellation and returned to the I Corps operating zone for urgent gunfire support duties. She provided support for Operation Daring Endeavor launched to destroy enemy troop concentrations south of Da Nang. Commended for her part in this action, Towers remained on the scene from 17 to 30 November. She again provided anti-rocket support out of Da Nang from the 21st through the 25th. In addition, she provided gunfire for Korean marines: and the Army's 101st Airborne Division.

Towers then sailed north to the Philippines for up keep at Subic Bay before proceeding to Singapore for rest and recreation. She arrived back on "Yankee Station" three days before Christmas, to assume the role of escort commander for USS Intrepid. After two days of this duty, however, the guided missile destroyer was back in the IV Corps operating area on night-harassment fire duties against the communist ground forces.

New Year's Day 1969 found the ship still engaging the enemy in the IV Corps' zone, supporting Vietnamese ranger battalions. During this period, Towers 5-inch rifles wreaked havoc upon Viet Cong and North Vietnamese troop concentrations, bunkers, sampans, and footbridges. The ship then spent a few days at Hong Kong before she returned to the "gunline", once more at Da Nang. She supported the U.S. 3rd Marine Division, operating north and south of Da Nang, blasting enemy troops and structures, again in support of Korean marines and the 101st Airborne.

Towers furnished gunfire support for South Vietnamese Army (ARVN) units in January 1969 and shelled shore targets for the 3rd Marine Division and the 101st Airborne Division, both north and south of Da Nang. From her anchorage inside Da Nang harbor, the guided missile destroyer fired frequent night harassment and counter-rocket site fire against communist positions in the surrounding countryside. Her damage assessments for this duty included destruction of targets such as troop concentrations, bunkers, footbridges, and supply-carrying sampans.

Shifting again to "Yankee Station", Towers joined the screen of USS Hancock on station with TG 77.5 until 7 February. She then sailed for Subic Bay for three days of upkeep before proceeding on to Yokosuka. Departing Japanese waters on 21 February, Towers soon headed east and brought this WestPac deployment to a close when she sailed into San Diego harbor on 4 March 1969.

=== 1970s ===
Towers spent much of the year 1970 on routine local operations in the vicinity of her home port in preparation for future WestPac deployments. On 4 September, while conducting refresher training out of San Diego, the ship directed a helicopter to rescue the pilot from an F-8 Crusader that had crashed nearby. The embarked evaluation team from the Fleet Training Group gave the ship a grade of "outstanding" during this "unscheduled evolution."

Deploying again to WestPac on 7 January 1971, Towers proceeded to Vietnamese waters, via Pearl Harbor and Midway. While she proceeded west on 20 January, one of the other ships in her convoy, Roark, suffered a major engine room fire which stopped her dead in the water. Towers turned-to and lent a hand. After the fire was extinguished, the guided missile destroyer took Roark in tow until Quapaw arrived and took over the towing.

Towers arrived back on the gunline on 8 February and provided gunfire support until the 21st, when she moved to "Yankee Station" to provide plane-guard service for USS Ranger. On 6 March, a member of the carrier's flight deck force was blown over the side during launching operations. Towers quickly sped to the scene, rescued the sailor, and returned him to his ship.

A short visit to Subic Bay followed, as did another tour on the gunline and the northern SAR station. The ship then returned to Subic Bay for upkeep and then made still another tour as plane guard and screen for Kitty Hawk. She departed WestPac on 1 July. Arriving at San Diego on the 15th, Towers operated out of her home base into the early spring of 1972. Gunnery exercises, underway training evolutions (with emphasis on ASW and AAW tactics); plane-guarding for Midway; and an upkeep and inport period all followed as the ship prepared for her upcoming WestPac deployment.

Events in Vietnam, however, forced a change in plan for Towers and rapidly accelerated her return to the war zone. Although not scheduled for deployment until September, she departed the west coast on 20 June, bound once more for-the gunline. A massive Viet Cong and North Vietnamese assault had battered South Vietnamese forces in key Quang Tri Province and resulted in emergency measures for the supporting naval forces offshore. During the voyage from the west coast to the South China Sea, the ship assisted in the rescue of six crewmen from a downed B-52 Stratofortress near Guam and received a commendation from the United States Secretary of the Navy.

A curtailed two-day upkeep period at Subic Bay preceded the ship's sailing on 13 July for the gunline. Heavy commitments and long hours of gunfire support duty in support of ARVN troops followed from 17 to 28 July as Towers participated in Operation Lamson 72. From 29 July to 5 August, the ship operated on "Linebacker" strikes against targets to the northward of the DMZ, in North Vietnam, as part of Task Unit 77.1.2. On several occasions during this time, she came under fire from communist shore batteries.

The intense gunfire support duties assigned to the ship soon wore out the linings of her two 5-inch guns, so the ship sailed for Sasebo, where she spent the week from 9 to 15 August undergoing a re-gunning. She soon returned to the "gunline" and supported ARVN troops off Huế. The destroyer also fired night "Linebacker" strikes on 24 and 25 September, rounding out the month with gunfire support missions fired for the 1st ARVN division.

A visit to Hong Kong for needed rest and recreation for her crew soon followed, and an upkeep period at Subic Bay preceded the ship's return to Vietnamese waters on 21 October. She supported the ARVN 22d Division near Qui Nhon and around Quang Tri. She then again visited Subic Bay and Kaohsiung, Taiwan, before returning to the gunline again from 3 to 8 December. For the rest of the month, Towers fired gunfire support missions against North Vietnamese troop concentrations near Quang Tri. Spirited exchanges of gunfire with enemy shore batteries took place on numerous occasions during this period.

She finished the year 1972 again serving as plane guard for Constellation on "Yankee Station" and closed out her grueling seven-month deployment on the last day of the year, when she sailed for Yokosuka. From there, she returned home via Midway and Pearl Harbor.

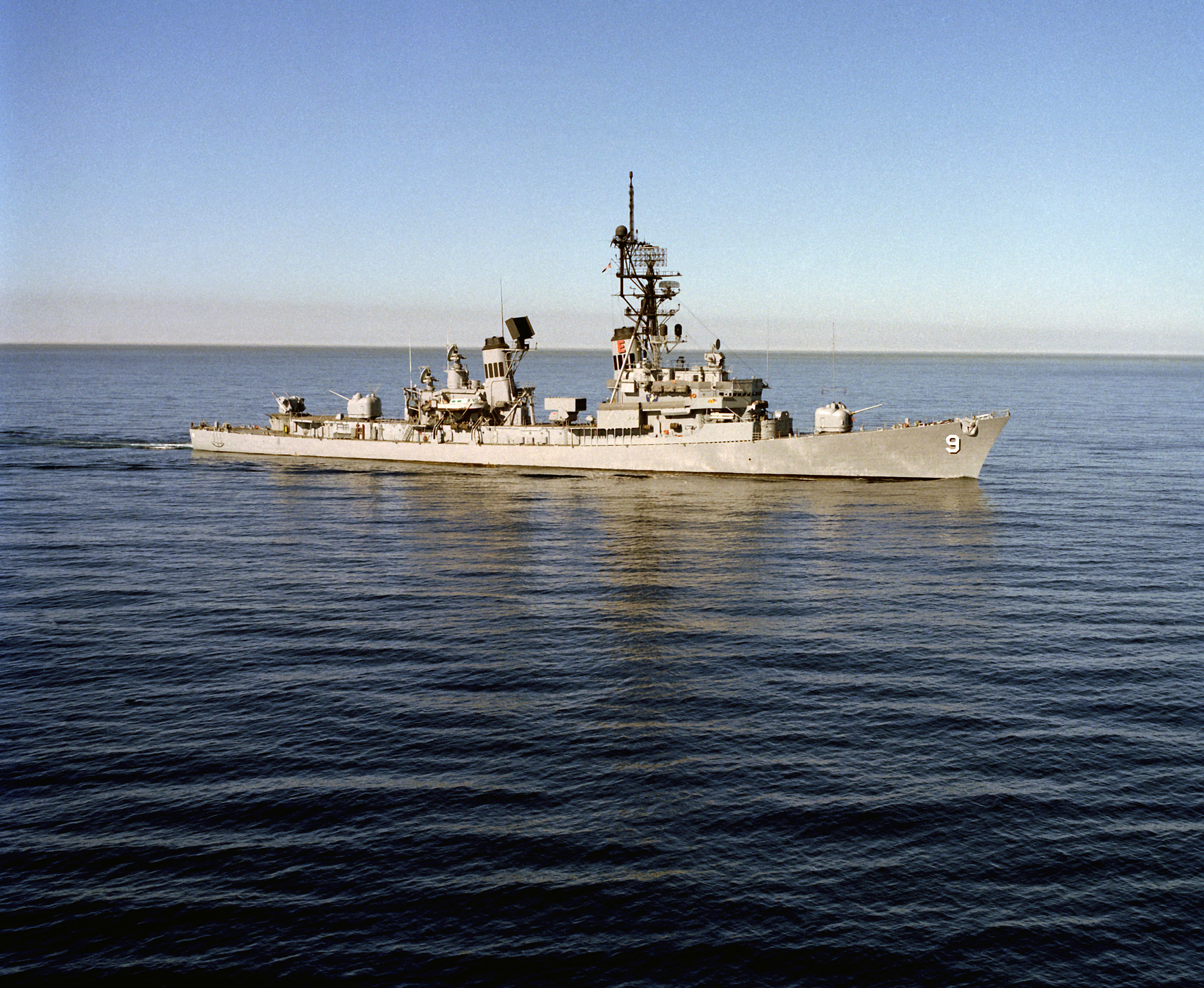
Towers underway on 16 January 1976

This deployment turned out to be the destroyer's last in support of the Vietnam War. The "Vietnamization" plan placed the burden of self-defense on the shoulders of the South Vietnamese, as American land, sea, and air forces were withdrawn from combat in January and February 1973. Towers returned to San Diego and soon underwent refurbishment at Long Bach shipyards. Towers then operated out of San Diego from 1973 through 1976, pursuing a regular schedule of local operations, routine upkeep and overhaul periods, and underway training evolutions.

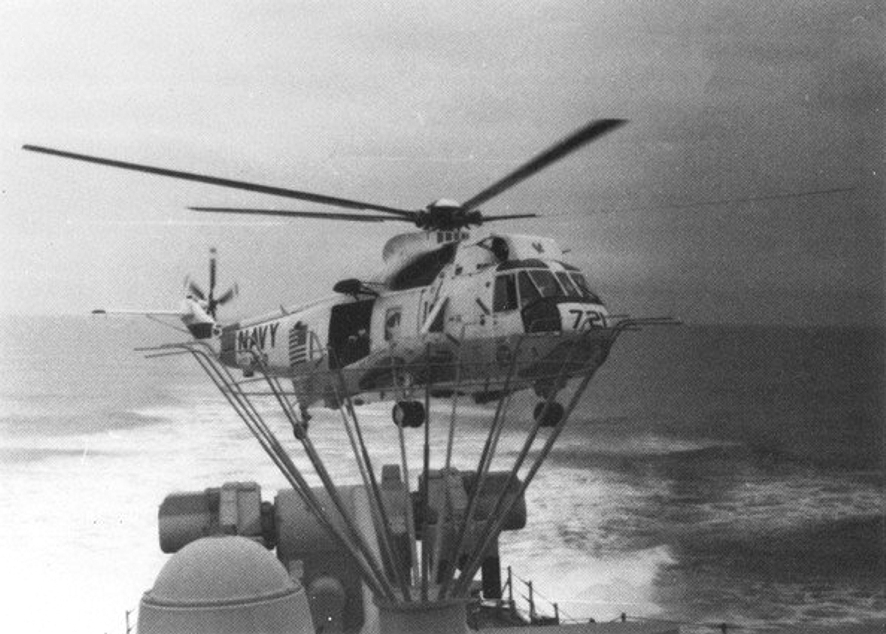
SH-3D Sea King of HS-2 hovers over fantail of Towers in 1976

Towers departed San Diego on 30 July 1976 for her first extended overseas deployment in three years. She conducted exercises and local operations in the western Pacific (WESTPAC) while stationed at Subic Bay Naval Station, Philippines. Towers participated in Exercise "Sharkhunt XVII" with the Taiwanese Navy and made a port call in Kaohsiung, Taiwan.

Towers then performed an extended cruise through the busy Strait of Malacca into the Indian Ocean, with port calls to Singapore, Colombo, Sri Lanka and Karachi, Pakistan. While in Columbo the crew of the USS Towers were honored as guests of the European diplomatic community and the U.S. Marines embassy detachment at the coastal European diplomatic recreation center, overlooking the Indian Ocean.

While in the Indian Ocean Towers took part in "Midlink 76" with units of the Iranian, Pakistani, British, and American Navies in mid-November.

Towers then returned to the South China Sea where she participated in "Multiplex/Missilex-76" with other United States 7th Fleet units.

Following port visits to Hong Kong from 6 to 12 January and Bangkok, Thailand from 29 January to 4 February 1977, Towers engaged in a coordinated ASW (Anti-Submarine-Warfare) exercise, "Sharkhunt XX", with the Taiwanese Navy from 22 to 25 February and made a second port call in Kaohsiung, Taiwan.

She returned to San Diego via Hawaii on 21 March to complete her seven-month, three-week WESTPAC deployment. Post-deployment operations off the west coast were highlighted by port visits to San Francisco, California and Vancouver, British Columbia, from 9 to 17 July for Vancouver's annual Sea Festival. Towers last significant operations at sea for the year occurred during the period 12 to 16 September when she conducted naval gunfire support exercises on the range at San Clemente Island. On 23 September, the guided missile destroyer commenced a four-month availability at San Diego which took her into the new year.

Post-availability trials commenced on 26 January 1978, and Towers spent the next nine months evaluating her radar detection and tracking system during numerous at-sea operations for that purpose. On 14 November, the ship got underway for Long Beach where she entered the Naval Shipyard on the 15th for commencement of a regular overhaul which took her into 1979.

== 1980s ==
In January 1980, Towers' ships' company received news that the ship's home port would change to Yokosuka, Japan, in October. The crew spent the next nine months preparing for the homeport change, which required passing a series of service inspections, repairing engineering casualties and preparing for overseas deployment. In July, Towers underwent a special availability at Puget Sound Naval Shipyard, arriving on the 13th for repairs to her missile launcher system. The repairs only took two weeks since replacement parts were obtained from the decommissioned guided missile cruiser USS Chicago. Departing San Diego on 14 October, Towers sailed for Japan, arriving in Yokosuka via Pearl Harbor on 10 November. Following an upkeep period through 12 December, the warship conducted a short familiarization cruise in Japanese waters until the 19th whereupon she began a holiday leave and upkeep period.

After a series of local operations and exercises, including an ASW exercise with Japan Maritime Self-Defense Force (JMSDF) warships, Towers sailed to the Middle East in mid-April to relieve guided missile cruiser USS Reeves as radar picket ship in the Persian Gulf. Concluding operations on 14 May, she slowly made her way home, visiting Thailand, Singapore, and Subic Bay, as well as rescuing 138 Vietnamese refugees from three small craft in the South China Sea before putting into Yokosuka on 11 June. Less than a month later, Towers was on hand for another rescue on 4 July, this time picking up 26 survivors from a South Korean freighter that had gone down in bad weather 25 miles east of Hong Kong. A planned restricted availability at Yokosuka followed, during which the yard replaced both propellers as well as the sandblasted and repainted the hull. Maintenance problems hampered the warship over the next few months, but the guided missile destroyer managed to conduct multiple training evolutions with two aircraft carrier battle groups as they transited the area.

Towers resumed local operations in early February 1982 with an anti-submarine warfare (ASW) exercise off Sasebo with JMSDF ships Kurama and Sagami. During the exercise, the warship successfully fired practice torpedoes at submarine Blueback. After a cruise to Okinawa and Hong Kong later in the month, Towers joined carrier Midway and the rest of Battle Group Alpha for an operational "tune-up" prior to Exercise Team Spirit '82 in mid-March. Operations with the battle group continued off and on until 5 May, when the guided missile destroyer shifted to the carrier Ranger Battle Group. Over the next three days she conducted close-in AAW defense and plane guard duties for Ranger during "war-at-sea" exercises. In company with Reeves, Towers successfully fired two SM-1 missiles before steaming to Subic Bay on 22 May for a two-week upkeep period. Following Naval Gunfire Support (NGFS) qualifications, the guided missile destroyer returned to Yokosuka on 18 June.

Following a restricted availability through July 1982, Towers resumed the familiar pattern of operations out of Yokosuka. These included battle group training evolutions with Midway, ASW exercises with Japanese warships as well as investigating and shadowing Soviet warships in the northern Pacific, a regimen that lasted through September. On 12 October, she got underway with Battle Group Alpha for a voyage to the Indian Ocean, stopping at Subic Bay the next day and then sailing for Singapore. While en route, the warship rescued 65 Vietnamese refugees from a small craft in the South China Sea and transferred them to Midway for further processing. The warships then conducted exercises with Singapore naval and air units in late October, visited Pattaya beach, Thailand, in early November, and conducted battle group operations while en route to Japan, arriving at Yokosuka via Hong Kong on 10 December.

In mid-January 1983, Towers commenced Team Spirit '83, a joint exercise off South Korea, followed by the periodic Nuclear Weapons Certification inspection. After a short period at Yokosuka (10–27 February 1983), the warship conducted another set of battle group operations. Unfortunately, during the afternoon watch on 2 March, while en route to Chinhae, Korea, a ruptured steam line in number one fire room inflicted serious injuries on FNs Pino and Jones and BT2 Dyer; all were med-evaced by helicopter to Midway. FN Pino died from his injuries. Towers subsequently returned to Sasebo for repairs between 2–19 March. Following more battle group operations, the ship returned to Chinhae for a Nuclear Technical Proficiency Inspection (23–27 March), thereafter participating in FleetEx 83-1, a major northern Pacific exercise involving carriers Enterprise, Coral Sea and Midway. Gunnery exercises in April, a joint midshipmen cruise with the JMSDF out of Kure and Valiant Usher 83, a combined amphibious assault exercise off the coast of Korea, rounded out the summer. After a maintenance availability in Yokosuka (13–25 August), Towers sailed south with DesRon 15, bound for the Indian Ocean. During the transit, the guided missile destroyer helped track a Soviet Echo II-class guided missile submarine and her escorts through the Malacca Straits. On 20 September, she arrived at Diego Garcia to refuel, subsequently transiting to Phuket, Thailand, for a five-day visit. After a stop at Subic Bay on 11 October, the warship supported the final salvage stages of salvage work at the Korean Air Lines Flight 007 crash site (22 October – 6 November) before reaching Yokosuka on 9 November.

Towers underwent a major overhaul at Yokosuka during most of 1984, receiving the Harpoon anti-ship missile system, improved electronics equipment and major work on boiler tubes and brickwork. Conducting her first sea trials after the overhaul (4–7 September), she departed Yokosuka ahead of schedule on 17 October for two months of combat systems certification in the Hawaiian operating areas.

Following a series of service inspections in January and February 1985, Towers conducted refresher training off South Korea and out of Subic Bay before sailing south for Cobra Gold '85, a joint training exercise with the Thai military held 7–16 July. During her transit south, Towers rescued another group of Vietnamese refugees, her fourth such humanitarian rescue in her career. Subsequent to Cobra Gold, the guided missile destroyer steamed to the North Arabian Sea via Singapore and Diego Garcia, arriving on station on 4 August. Battle group operations remained fairly quiet, with the warship tasked to track Soviet or Indian aircraft on a periodic basis. Tragedy struck on the night of 7 August, however, when Liberty 603, an E-2C from VAW-115, impacted the water off Midway's flight deck. The search and rescue effort, in which Towers participated, yielded three of the five crew members; Lt.(j.g.) Kevin R. Kuhnigk, USNR, and Ens. Christopher Mims, USNR, however, perished in the mishap. After a "war-at-sea" exercise in the Indian Ocean, Battle Group Alpha steamed southeast to western Australia, where Towers enjoyed five days of liberty in Geraldton, Australia (13–19 September). Thereafter, she participated in Valiant Usher '85, a joint exercise with Australian forces, and AnnualEx 85, a joint U.S.-Japanese operation, before reaching Yokosuka on 15 October.

After a series of local operations and individual ship exercises, Towers participated in Exercise Team Spirit 86 off Korea in late February and early March 1986. Upon her return home on 3 April 1986, the guided missile destroyer underwent and passed four major inspections; a command security inspection, (24 April) a combat systems readiness test (14–19 April), a Board of Inspection and Survey visit (5–9 May) and a boiler inspection (12 May). After celebrating her 25th anniversary on 29 May, Towers hosted a celebration in her home port for crew and their families, as well as local dignitaries. She then returned to certifications, service exams and inspections, tasks that kept the crew busy until mid-September when she sailed for Guam. After participation in multinational exercise CrowEater '86, the guided missile destroyer sailed south for a series of port visits in eastern Australia, stopping at Cairns, Sydney, Adelaide and Brisbane before returning home on 15 November via Cairns and Guam.

The new year got off to a good start with the crew receiving "outstanding" in all areas during the 5–8 January 1987 command inspection. Local operations followed, including training for the annual March–April Exercise Team Spirit '87. On 15–19 May Towers took part in the Shimoda Black Ship Festival, celebrating the visit of Commodore Matthew Calbraith Perry's squadron to Japan in July 1853. She spent the rest of the summer in preparation for another Indian Ocean deployment, upon which she embarked on 15 October. After a stop at Subic Bay in November, the warship sailed to the Persian Gulf, beginning the new year moored alongside the destroyer tender Cape Cod for availability at Masirah, Oman.

Upon completion, Towers, in company with frigate Francis Hammond, sailed to Karachi, Pakistan, for a five-day port visit (14–18 January 1988) during which the commanding officer called upon the CNO of the Pakistan Navy. The guided missile destroyer subsequently made her way to the Republic of the Maldives for a four-day port visit and then to Diego Garcia for five days. After a stop at Pattaya Beach, Thailand, in mid-February, Towers accomplished her fifth rescue of Vietnamese refugees on 29 February, picking up 126 survivors of a "grossly overloaded" boat with a broken-down engine and no food or water. Continuing on home, the guided missile destroyer stopped at Subic Bay and Hong Kong before participating in the annual bilateral exercise Team Spirit 87 off South Korea (16 March – 3 April). Following local exercises, Towers participated in a joint exercise with the Japanese in the Philippine Sea (13–19 May), an ASW exercise in the Sea of Japan (11–14 June), before putting to sea on the 23rd for Exercise Mekar 88 alongside ships of the Royal Malaysian Navy (7–13 July). She combined that operation with Exercise Cobra Gold 88 off Thailand (24 July – 1 August), upon completion of which she returned to Yokosuka for a 90-day restricted availability.

Upon completion of repairs, which included replacing both 5-inch gun mounts, the warship conducted sea trials and gunnery drills starting on 9 November 1988. During those evolutions, however, some shells fell both within Japanese territorial waters and near a cutter of the Japanese Maritime Safety Agency (JMSA), Uraga (PLH-04). The U.S. Navy report stated that "no vessel or object was used as a target" and that the place of impact was 1,900 meters away from the cutter, but the JMSA investigation said that the shells fell continuously at a distance of 300 to 500 meters from the cutter, and Japanese Diet members pointed out the possibility that the shells were aimed at the cutter. The Japan government protested the incident and the Navy relieved Towers' commanding officer "for cause without relief." Despite the embarrassing incident, the warship resumed local operations soon after.

Departing Yokosuka on 6 January 1989, Towers sailed south for refresher training out of Subic Bay. Engineering trouble hampered these evolutions, however, and the guided missile destroyer put into the Ship Repair Facility (SRF) there for repairs in late January. Detailed inspections quickly determined that the guided missile destroyer had suffered damage to turbine blades as well as both propellers. "It was amazing", one technician commented later, "that the whole turbine did not disintegrate." The guided missile destroyer finally put to sea for exercises with the Midway Battle Group in June. After a month-long stay at Yokosuka starting on 15 July, Towers sailed south for more exercises with the battle group. While in transit to Pattaya Beach in late August, however, the warship received the news that Lt. Col. William R. Higgins, USMC, kidnapped by Iranian-supported terrorists in Beirut, Lebanon, the previous February, had been murdered. Ordered to the Indian Ocean for contingency operations, as well as to oversee the end of tanker convoy operations in the Persian Gulf, Towers patrolled those waters until early October. She then sailed south for a port visit to Mombasa, Kenya, 18–21 October, before arriving in Subic Bay on 27 November. Although Towers departed 1 December, an attempted coup d'état in the Philippines kept her there for a week of contingency operations before she arrived home on 11 December.

Although the guided missile destroyer continued intermittent local operations in early 1990, Towers received word of future decommissioning and began inactivation inspections in April. She got underway for the last time on 18 June, to serve as plane guard for Midway, and visited Pusan, South Korea, before returning to Yokosuka on the 30th.

== Decommissioning and disposal ==
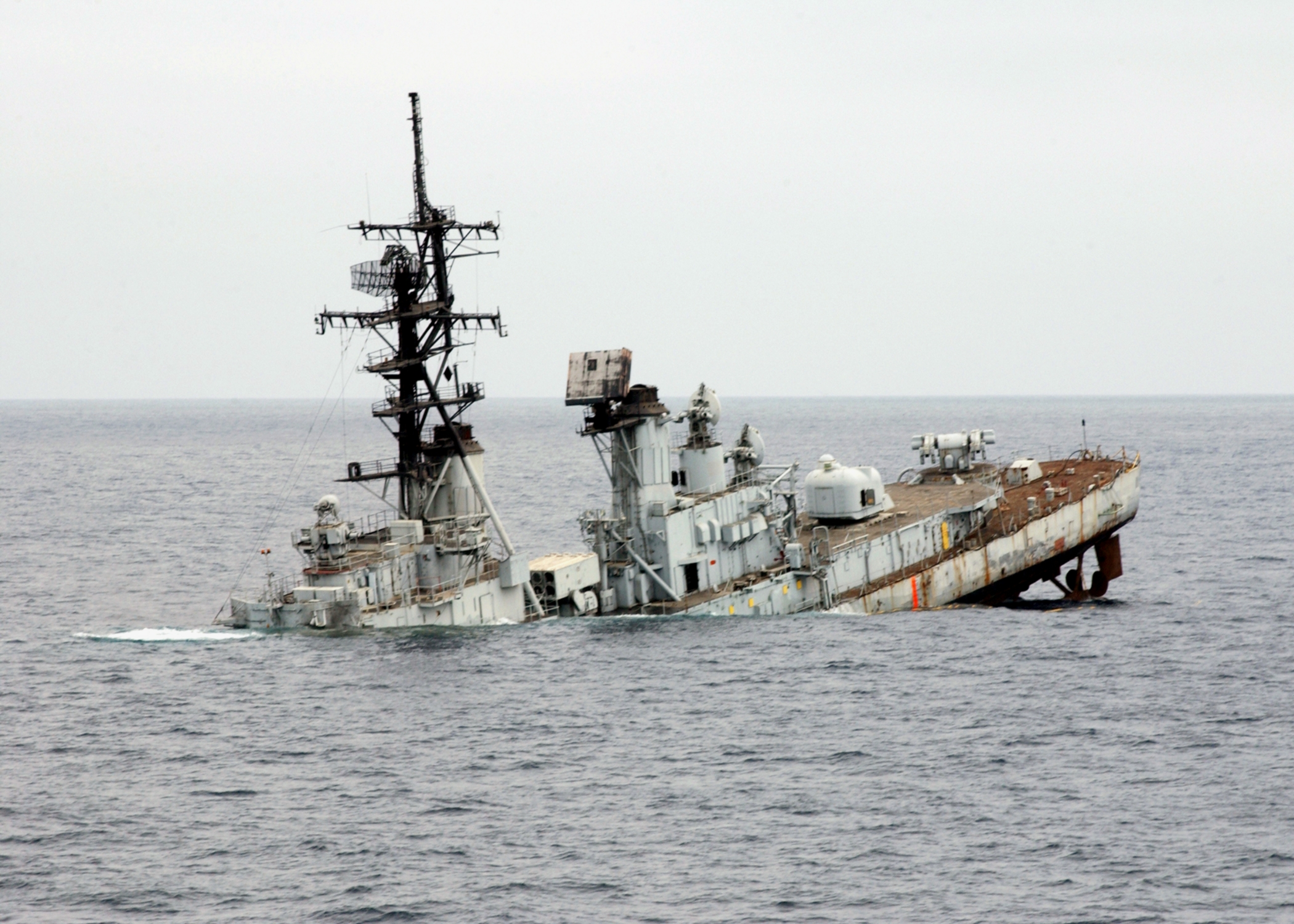
Ex-Towers (DDG-9) sinking on 9 October 2002 following a live-fire exercise (SINKEX).

On 17 July 1990, Towers moved to drydock for inactivation procedures, and she was decommissioned at Yokosuka on 1 October 1990. She later was towed to the Inactive Ship Maintenance Facility at Pearl Harbor and stricken from the Naval Vessel Register on 26 May 1992. Plans to convert her into a barge were cancelled, and ultimately the guided-missile frigate USS Sides (FFG-14) sank her as a target in a fleet training exercise (SinkEx) off the coast of California on 9 October 2002.

== Honors and awards ==
- Navy Unit Commendation
- Meritorious Unit Commendation
- Vietnam Service Medal with four battle stars

Towers received one Navy Unit Commendation, one Meritorious Unit Commendation, and four battle stars for her service during the Vietnam War.

== Commemoration ==
Tower′s captain's gig is on display at Freedom Park in Omaha, Nebraska.
