= Donald L. Beggs =

American statistician

Don Beggs
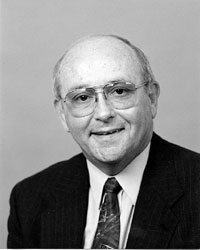
- Born: Donald Lee Beggs; Harrisburg
- Education: Southern Illinois University at Carbondale (BA, MA) University of Iowa (PhD)
- Occupation: University President

Donald Lee Beggs was the President of Wichita State University from 1999 until 2012, when he was replaced by John W. Bardo. He was chair of the Kansas Board of Regents Council of University Presidents for the 2002-03 academic year.

== Early career ==
At Southern Illinois University at Carbondale, Beggs received his bachelor's and master's degrees in education. He earned his doctorate in educational measurement and statistics from the University of Iowa in 1966. After completing his Ph.D., he returned to SIUC and joined the Department of Guidance and Educational Psychology. He served in numerous administrative positions during his 32-year tenure at Southern Illinois University, including Dean of the College of Education, Vice President for Academic Affairs, and President, retiring in 1998 as Chancellor of SIU system.

He is the senior author of a nationally standardized test and the author of several books and numerous academic articles. He was selected to serve on the Executive Committee of the National Collegiate Athletic Association and the NCAA Division I Board of Directors beginning in 2001.

== Presidency at Wichita State University ==
Beggs became Wichita State University's 12th president in 1999. As president, he established the Koch Arena, the Marcus Welcome Center, and a renovation of the Rhatigan Student Center. He is also considered responsible for strengthening ties between WSU and the city of Wichita.

== Legacy ==
In 2016, Beggs was the one of commencement speakers for SIUC's graduation ceremony. As his family has a long history of attending SIUC, they established a "Beggs Legacy Scholarship" for students in the College of Education and Human Services and a more general "Beggs Symphony Fund". On Wichita State University's campus, the "Donald L. Beggs Hall Engineering Research Laboratory Building" was renamed after him in 2012.

== Personal life ==
Beggs grew up in Harrisburg, Illinois. Beggs' grandmother and mother both attended SIU, the first graduating in 1890 and the latter in 1926. Both Don and his wife, Shirley, as well as their two children, also attended SIUC. Today, Beggs lives in Bloomington, Indiana.
