= Stanley Thomas Counts =

United States Navy admiral (1926–2015)

- Born: July 3, 1926; Weleetka, Oklahoma, U.S.
- Died: January 27, 2015 (aged 88); La Jolla, California, U.S.
- Burial place: Miramar National Cemetery
- Military career
- Allegiance: United States
- Branch: United States Navy
- Service years: 1949–1979
- Rank: Rear Admiral
- Commands: USS Bronstein; USS Towers; USS Chicago
- Conflicts: Korean War; Vietnam War

Stanley Thomas Counts (3 July 1926 – 27 January 2015) was a United States Navy admiral whose Cold War military service extended through the Korean War and Vietnam War.

== Early life and education ==
Counts was born 3 July 1926 in Weleetka, Oklahoma. He was a son of Claude and Thelma (Thomas) Counts. He was commissioned as an ensign upon graduation from the United States Naval Academy in June 1949.

== Naval career ==
Following commissioning, Counts reported aboard the destroyer USS O'Hare and later served as combat information officer aboard the attack transport USS Bexar during the Korean War. He later served as operations officer aboard the escort destroyer USS Keppler and as executive officer of the destroyer escort USS Coolbaugh. Following graduation from the Naval Postgraduate School in 1955 with a Master of Science degree in engineering electronics, Counts was the ship commissioning executive officer of the destroyer USS Lawrence and served in that capacity through the Cuban Missile Crisis. He subsequently was the ship commissioning commanding officer of the destroyer escort USS Bronstein. After receipt of a Bronze Star Medal with "V" device for rescuing a downed pilot from Haiphong Harbor while commanding the destroyer USS Towers during the Vietnam War, Counts became the first project manager for the NATO RIM-7 Sea Sparrow program. He was promoted to rear admiral after commanding the cruiser USS Chicago through its 4th PIRAZ deployment. He then served as the last commander of the Naval Ordnance Systems Command prior to its merger into the Naval Sea Systems Command and commanded Cruiser-Destroyer Group 5 until he retired from active duty in 1979.

== Tonkin Gulf experience ==
Captain Counts was commanding USS Towers on an August night when his shipboard radar indicated what appeared to be surface contacts similar to those reported in the same area during the Tonkin Gulf incident two years earlier. Darkness prevented visual confirmation as the ships on PIRAZ and nearby search and rescue (SAR) stations maneuvered to defend against possible torpedo boat attack. The radar echoes abruptly disappeared when USS Towers fired a star shell to illuminate the area. Officers evaluated the situation as flocks of cormorant which dispersed when startled by the star shell. The official report of the event received limited distribution to avoid embarrassing President Lyndon B. Johnson.

== Ships commanded by Captain Counts ==
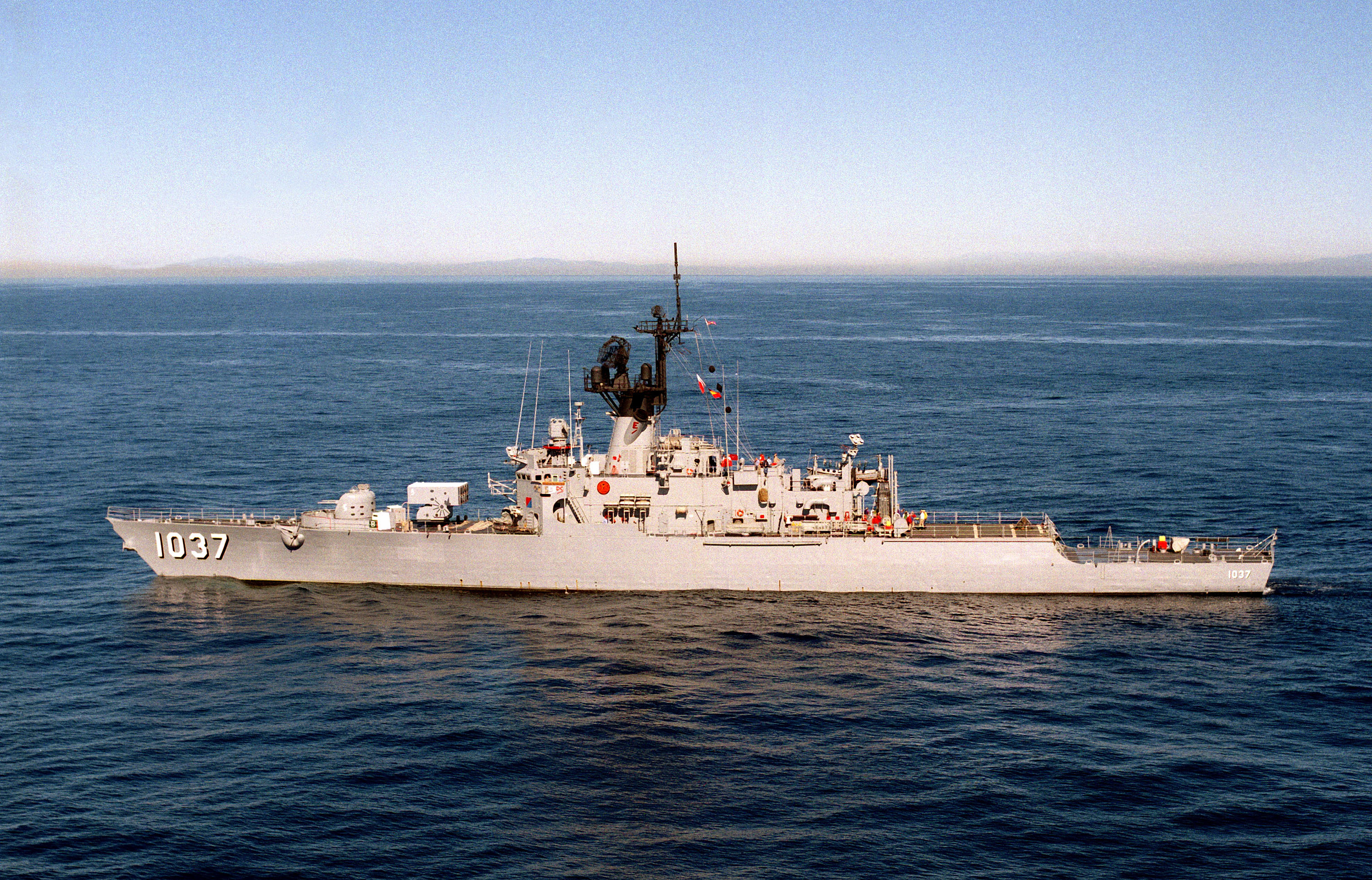
USS Bronstein

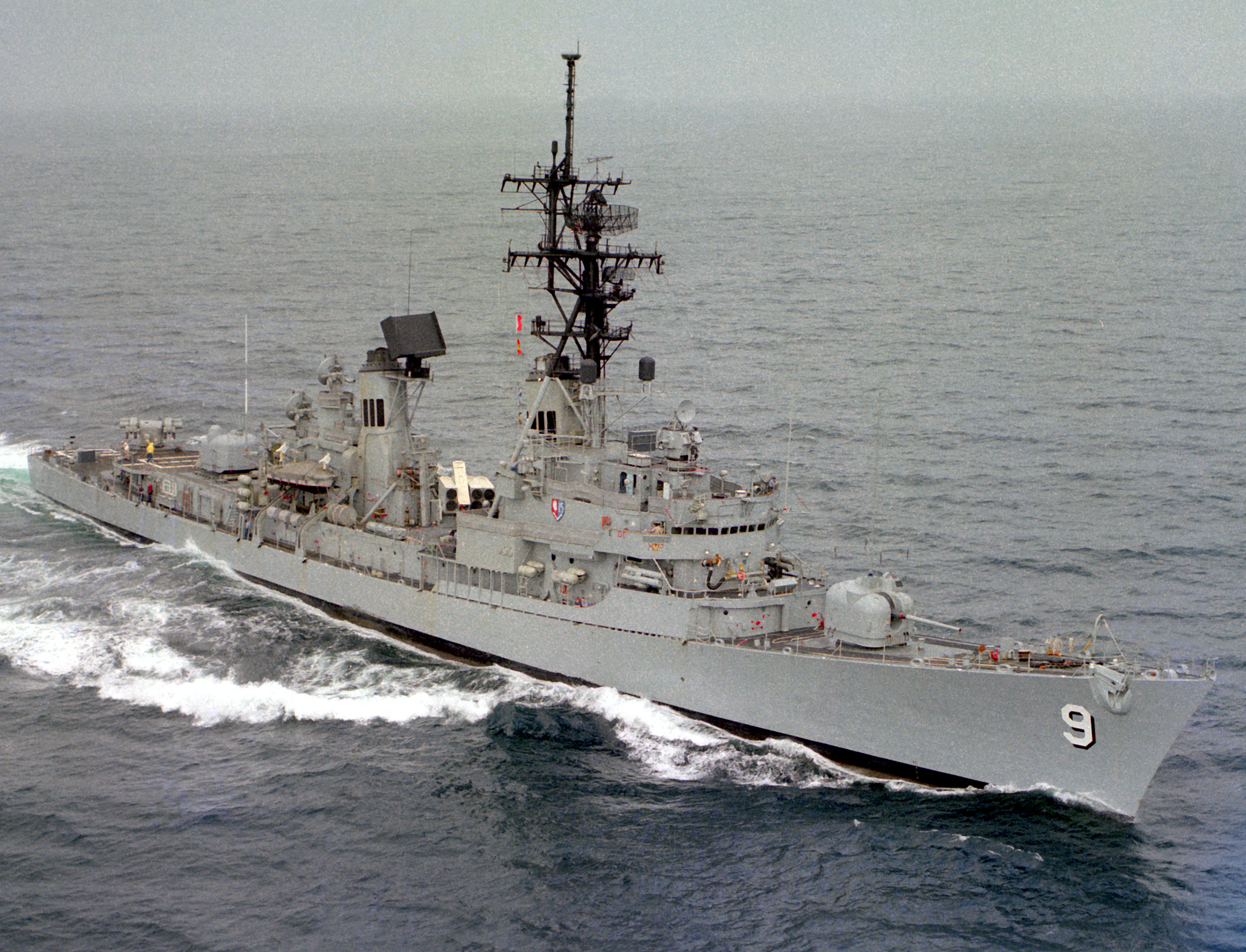
USS Towers

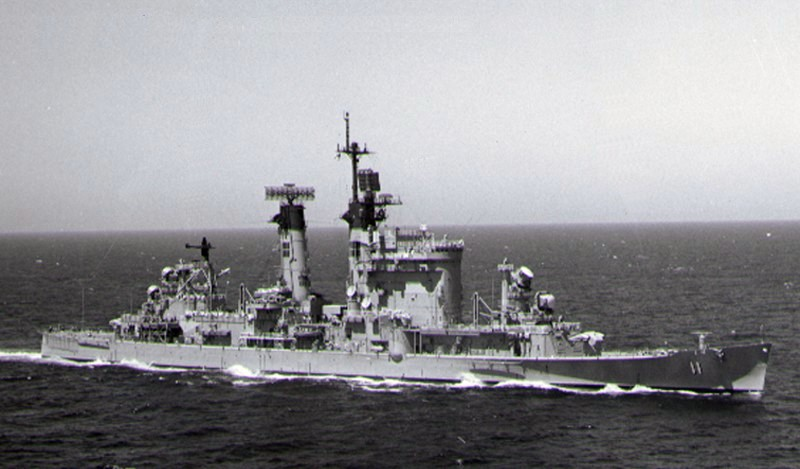
USS Chicago

== Later life ==
Counts was employed through the first decade of his retirement from naval service by Hughes Aircraft Company as assistant division manager for engineering services and support and as manager for the spares program office within the Ground Systems Group in Fullerton, California. He was active with San Diego civic organizations until dying from complications of Alzheimer's disease in 2015.

== Awards ==
Counts' awards include:

- Legion of Merit (3)
- Bronze Star Medal with "V" device
- American Campaign Medal
- World War II Victory Medal
- Navy Occupation Service Medal with Europe clasp
- Navy Expeditionary Medal
- China Service Medal
- National Defense Service Medal with bronze star
- Korean Service Medal with bronze star
- United Nations Service Medal
- Armed Forces Expeditionary Medal
- Vietnam Service Medal with two bronze stars
- Republic of Vietnam Campaign Medal with device
