= Lounsbury Foods =

Canadian food processing company

Lounsbury Foods Ltd
- Founded: 1962
- Headquarters: 1774 Drew Road, Mississauga; Ontario, Canada; L5S 1J6
- Area served: Canada, United States
- Products: Horseradish, seafood sauce, mustard, mint sauce, tartar sauce
- Brands: Cedarvale Food Products
- Website: giraffefoods.com

Lounsbury Foods, also known as Cedarvale Food Products, is a privately held food processing company established in 1962 with headquarters in Mississauga, Ontario. It is Canada's largest processor of horseradish. Other products include seafood sauce, tartar sauce, mustard, and mint sauce.

The company's factory, located on Wiltshire Avenue, produces approximately 72 million bottles of product each year, selling across Canada and exported into the United States.

Previously known as Cedervale Food Products, Lounsbury Foods is Canada’s largest processor of horseradish. It was first established by the Lounsbury family in 1962, on Wiltshire Avenue in Toronto, Ontario.

Lounsbury Foods Limited is a North American food processing facility of horseradish and seafood cocktail sauce products. In 2020, Lounsbury Foods was acquired by Giraffe Foods, an Ontario-based leading private label sauce manufacturer for North America in partnership with American private equity firm, Graham Partners. Giraffe Foods has incorporated Lounsbury into its existing services, as an extension into horseradish and ginger applications.
