= Adisak Mekkittikul =

Electrical engineer

Adisak Mekkittikul received his B.Eng. from King Mongkut's Institute of Technology Ladkrabang in Thailand and M.S. in electrical engineering from Wichita State University. He completed the Ph.D. degree in electrical engineering at Stanford University, Stanford, California, in 1999, after defending dissertation titled "Scheduling Non-Uniform Traffic in High Speed Packet Switchers and Routers" which he wrote while being mentored by Nicholas William McKeown. He was a Senior Member of Technical Staff at Berkeley Concept Research Corp.

While studying at Stanford, he worked on high performance networking problems. By introducing two maximum weight matching algorithms, Mekkittikul and his Stanford advisor Professor McKeown proved that it is possible to achieve 100% throughput in an input-queued switch. Dr. Mekkittikul is a co-recipient of IEEE Communications Society Stephen O. Rice Prize Paper Award in the field of communications theory for the best original paper published in the IEEE Transactions on Communications.

== Publications ==
His four significantly cited publications are:

- "Achieving 100% throughput in an input-queued switch " by McKeown, N., Mekkittikul, A., Anantharam, V., Walrand, J. IEEE Transactions on Communications 47 (8), pp. 1260–1267, (1999) cited 319 times according to Scopus.
- "CORD: Contention resolution by delay lines" by Chlamtac, I., Fumagalli, A., Kazovsky, L.G., Melman, P., Nelson, W.H., Poggiolini, P., Cerisola, M., Chlamtac, I., Fumagalli, A., Kazovsky, L.G., Melman, P., Nelson, W.H., Poggiolini, P., Cerisola, M., Masum Choudhury, A.N.M., Fong, T.K., Hofmeister, R.T., Lu, C.-L., Mekkittikul, A., Sabido IX, D.J.M., Suh, C.-J., Wong, E.W.M. IEEE Journal on Selected Areas in Communications 14 (5), pp. 1014–1028 (1996) cited 186 times.
- "Tiny tera: A packet switch core " McKeown, N., Izzard, M., Mekkittikul, A., Ellersick, W., Horowitz, M. IEEE Micro 17 (1), pp. 26–33 (1997). Cited 128 times.
- "Practical scheduling algorithm to achieve 100% throughput in input-queued switches" Mekkittikul, Adisak, McKeown, Nick Proceedings - IEEE INFOCOM 2, pp. 792–799 (1998) cited 109 times.
