= Monica Lounsbery =

American academic administrator

Monica Lounsbery is an American academic administrator currently serving as the senior executive vice president and provost at Wichita State University, a position she assumed in January 2025. Her career includes previous roles as dean of the College of Health and Human Services at California State University, Long Beach, and various administrative positions at the University of Nevada, Las Vegas, alongside research focusing on population-level physical activity.

== Early life ==
Lounsbery is from Green River, Wyoming. She completed her undergraduate education at Dakota Wesleyan University in Mitchell, South Dakota, earning a bachelor's degree in biology and chemistry. She pursued graduate studies at the University of Nebraska–Lincoln, where she obtained a master's degree in sport pedagogy and a Ph.D. in sport pedagogy and educational research methods.

== Career ==
Lounsbery began her academic career at the University of Nevada, Las Vegas (UNLV), where she held multiple administrative roles, including department chair, associate vice provost, vice provost, and associate dean for faculty affairs in the School of Medicine. During her 15-year tenure at UNLV, she contributed to the university's academic leadership in various capacities.

Subsequently, Lounsbery joined California State University, Long Beach, where she served as the dean of the College of Health and Human Services for over eight years. Her responsibilities included overseeing academic programs and fostering partnerships within the college.

In November 2024, Wichita State University announced Lounsbery's appointment as senior executive vice president and provost, a role she assumed on January 5, 2025. She succeeded Shirley Lefever, who retired after a 20-year tenure at the university. As provost, Lounsbery expressed her intent to emphasize strategic planning and strengthen partnerships, particularly through the development of the Biomedical Campus.

Lounsbery's research focuses on increasing population-level physical activity. She is a recognized member of several professional organizations, including the National Academy of Kinesiology. Additionally, she co-authored a children's book titled I Can Move.

== Personal life ==
Monica Lounsbery is married to Chris Lounsbery and has two children. In her personal time, she enjoys learning to golf, writing music, and playing with her band, Higher Ed.
