= Jay Golden =

American academic

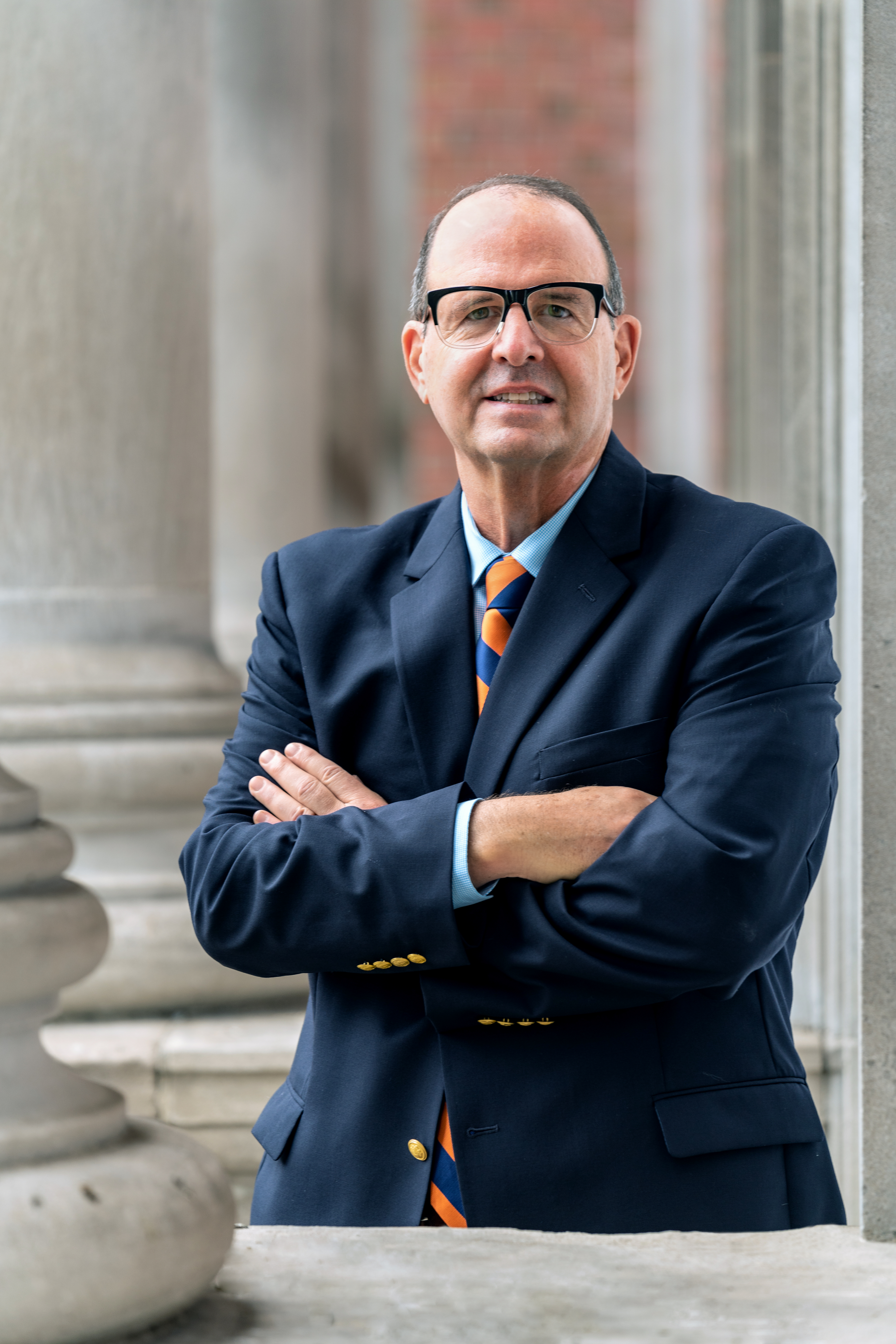
- Golden in 2021
- Education: University of Phoenix (BA); Arizona State University; University of Cambridge (MPhil, PhD)
- Children: 2

Jay S. Golden is an academic, researcher, and university administrator. Golden is the Pontarelli Professor of Environmental Sustainability & Finance at Syracuse University where he also directs the Dynamic Sustainability Lab. He is the author of the 2023 book, Dynamic Sustainability: Implications for Policy, Markets and National Security.

== Biography ==
Golden was born in Los Angeles, California. In college he played lacrosse both for Arizona State University and for Cambridge University and was a member of Alpha Epsilon Pi fraternity. Prior to his academic career Golden served seven years as a police officer, hazardous materials specialist and environmental crimes detective.

Golden received his PhD in engineering from the University of Cambridge (Division of Geotechnical, Petroleum and Sustainable Engineering) and his MPhil in Environmental Engineering and Sustainable Development as part of the Cambridge-MIT Institute, a joint program of the University of Cambridge and the Massachusetts Institute of Technology (MIT). Golden is an alumnus of Wolfson College at the University of Cambridge.

=== Syracuse University ===
Golden was named the inaugural Pontarelli Professor of Environmental Sustainability and Finance in the Maxwell School of Citizenship and Public Affairs at Syracuse University in August 2021. Golden founded and directs the Dynamic Sustainability Lab. He teaches at the main campus as well as at Syracuse in Washington DC and Syracuse in London.

=== Duke University ===
Golden was an associate professor of the Practice for Sustainable Systems Analysis at the Nicholas School of the Environment and Pratt School of Engineering at Duke University. Golden was a co-director of the Business & Environment graduate program and served as the Director of the Duke Center for Sustainability & Commerce. At Duke University Golden's teaching and research focused on "examining organizational and technology intervention strategies in regards to regional and global social and environmental impacts from population and consumptive patterns".

=== Arizona State University ===
Prior to September 2010, Golden was an assistant professor and honors faculty in the School of Sustainability at Arizona State University (2006–2010), after its formation from the Center for Environmental Studies (2003–2006). In 2006 he founded and became the Director of The National Center of Excellence on SMART Innovations for Urban Climate & Energy and in 2008 he was the Founder and co-director of The Sustainability Consortium, both positions held until his transition to Duke in 2010. Golden also held a joint appointment with the School of Civil, Environmental and Sustainable Engineering (2007–2010).

=== Wichita State University ===
In 2019, Golden was selected by the Kansas Board of Regents to become the 14th president of Wichita State University. He assumed the presidency on January 2, 2020. He resigned on September 25, 2020. It is speculated that his resignation was due to pressure from WSU's donors after not featuring a speech from Ivanka Trump during WSU Tech's commencement at the height of national civil unrest on June 5, 2020 and for initiating a formal investigation of the men's basketball coach for alleged abuse of students and staff prior to Golden's tenure.

=== East Carolina University ===
In 2017, Golden became the vice chancellor for research at East Carolina University (ECU) and a tenured full professor of Engineering while holding a secondary appointment in Supply Chain. Golden oversaw research, economic development and engagement at ECU which, is the only university in North Carolina with a medical school, dental school and a college of engineering.

== Honors ==
In 2012, Scientific American listed the Sustainability Index developed by Golden and the Sustainability Consortium which he co-founded and co-directed as one of the Top 10 World Changing Ideas. In September 2009, Golden received the Faculty Pioneer Award from the Center for Business Education at the Aspen Institute. The Aspen Institute's Faculty Pioneer Award is the "Oscars of the business school world" according to The Financial Times. Award recipients are recognized for demonstrating "leadership and risk-taking in integrating ethical, environmental and social issues into the business curriculum."

Golden was recognized as a "Rising Star" for his commitment to "developing curriculum that fosters multidisciplinary approaches to solving pressing sustainability imperatives for business and society" and his roles as director of ASU's Certificate of Sustainable Technologies and Management program and founder and co-director of the summer Sustainable Energy Fellowship program with colleagues from MIT, Cornell, Duke and the University of Michigan. Also highlighted by the Aspen Institute was the research published by Golden and his Sustainability Consortium, the results of which have "provided a platform for the development of a more holistic approach to quantifying the sustainability of consumer products that accounts for all phases of a product’s life cycle."

In December 2009, Golden was designated Number 23 of the 100 Most Influential People in Business Ethics by Ethisphere Magazine for his work (as co-director of the Sustainability Consortium) with Wal-Mart on their sustainability index initiative. This recognition was given to individuals that had a "significant impact in the realm of business ethics over the course of the year [2009]."

Golden also was awarded an Industrial Ecology Fellowship by AT&T in 2004. He was appointed to the U.S. EPA Board of Scientific Counselors in 2017 and re-appointed in 2022 to the executive committee.

=== Founding and directing the Sustainability Consortium ===
The Sustainability Consortium was founded in 2009 by Jay Golden (ASU) and Jon Johnson (University of Arkansas) and continues to be jointly administered by the two universities today. Walmart Stores Inc. provided the initial financial investment that allowed the creation of the Sustainability Consortium and since then several other large corporations have joined (including McDonald's, Disney and Coca-Cola).

Regarding the history of the Sustainability Consortium, Golden said "It became very clear to us that no one researcher, no one institution, could do that [quantify the sustainability of products] because you're dealing with geographies around the world and with various sciences – physical, life, and engineering – and that required a multidisciplinary approach. So we outlined a proposal to Walmart to develop a consortium of academic researchers from institutions to think through the process and try to bring it to life based on the best available sound science and engineering principles available."

Walmart's goal in creating the Consortium was to "develop a global database of information on the lifecycle of products – from raw materials to disposal" in order to develop a "worldwide sustainable product index" which would aid in the creation of a "simple rating for consumers about the sustainability of products".

When asked in July 2009 about the creation of the Sustainability Consortium Golden said "Today an idea has come to reality, and it is even more exciting to envision the outcomes of the next part of this effort, as we create the science, technologies and strategies that vastly transform how businesses operate and how sustainability is infused into our everyday life."

Golden emphasized the "transparency" of the research being done by the Consortium, with information on product lifecycle and consumer research available to all companies regardless of their membership status.

=== Other scholarly contributions ===
In 2004, during his time at Arizona State University, Golden created the university's Certificate of Sustainable Technologies and Management program. He also founded and co-directed the Sustainable Energy Fellowship, a summer program in partnership with MIT, Cornell, Univ. of Michigan, ASU and Duke that exposed undergraduate students from around the country to "research and education in energy production, conversion, storage and sources that are environmentally friendly and renewable" educating them on "critical sustainability, energy, and climate change challenges faced by business."

Golden served as a Special Advisor to the Mayor of Phoenix on Sustainable Technologies at Arizona State University, a Special Advisor for Sustainability to the management team at the Dial Corporation and helped found the ASU chapter of Engineers Without Borders. Golden was the founder and director of the EPA-designated National Center of Excellence on SMART (Sustainable Materials & Renewable Technologies) Innovations at ASU. The Center "partners with industries and governments worldwide to develop a new generation of strategies and technologies to address climate-energy system impacts" with a focus on "engineering innovations for sustainable materials and renewable technologies".

=== Service ===
While completing his undergraduate studies, Golden served as a hazardous materials specialist, environmental crimes detective and police officer for the City of Tempe, AZ police department. Golden received the Life Saving Medal, Meritorious Service Medal, Distinguished Service Medal x 2 as well as the Sons of the American Revolution Law Enforcement Commendation Medal and the 1990 J. Stannard Baker Award at the International Association of Chiefs of Police Conference in Tulsa, Ok.
