= Wichita State University =

Public university in Wichita, Kansas, US

- Former names: Fairmount College (1895–1926); Municipal University of Wichita (1926–1964)
- Type: Public research university
- Established: September 11, 1895; 131 years ago
- Parent institution: Kansas Board of Regents
- Accreditation: HLC
- Academic affiliations: ORAU; USU; Space-grant
- Endowment: $350.9 million (2025)
- Budget: $880.8 million (2026)
- President: Richard Muma
- Provost: Monica Lounsbery
- Academic staff: 520
- Students: 24,640 (All campuses, fall 2026); 18,003 (Main campus, fall 2026)
- Undergraduates: 15,028 (Main campus, fall 2026,)
- Postgraduates: 2,975 (Main campus, fall 2026)
- Location: Wichita, Kansas, United States; 37°43′09″N 97°17′35″W
- Campus: 330 acres (1.3 km^{2}); Large city
- Other campuses: Haysville; Maize; McConnell Air Force Base; WSU Tech; WSU South; WSU Old Town
- Newspaper: The Sunflower
- Colors: Black and yellow
- Nickname: Shockers
- Sporting affiliations: NCAA Division I – The American (Conference USA for women's bowling)
- Mascot: WuShock
- Website: wichita.edu

Wichita State University (WSU) is a public research university in Wichita, Kansas, United States, governed by the Kansas Board of Regents. WSU offers more than 60 undergraduate programs across nine colleges, with over 200 areas of study. As of fall 2026, the main campus enrolled 18,003 students, the second-highest in university history. The graduate school provides more than 50 master's degrees, a specialist degree in education, and 13 doctoral programs. WSU holds an R2 classification for high research activity doctoral universities.

== History ==
The idea behind Wichita State University began in 1886. Joseph Homer Parker founded a private women's Congregational preparatory school which was supported mainly by Wichita's Plymouth Congregational Church, Parker's church. The school never opened its doors.

Called the "Young Ladies College," "Wichita Ladies College" and "Congregational Female College" and founded during a boom in college and university creation, the private school was envisioned to admit women twelve years and older. In early 1887, the project's leaders received a land parcel from the developers of the adjacent Fairmount Neighborhood and, in response, renamed their school Fairmount College. Envisioned to be the "Vassar of the West," the streets of the neighboring residential areas were named after prominent women's colleges including Vassar and Holyoke. The street names remain in 2023.

In 1892, a corporation bought the property and named the preparatory school Fairmount Institute. Also known as Fairmount Academy, this Congregational church prep school opened in September to boys and girls age 12 and above.

In 1895, on the same site, Fairmount College opened collegiate classes for men and women with funding by the Congregational Education Society. The society selected Nathan Jackson Morrison to be the president of the new college.

During the 1900s and 1910s, the school grew with structures including a men's dormitory, Fiske Hall, begun in 1904 and dedicated June 1906, and a Carnegie library, built in 1908, occupied in January 1909 and dedicated in January 1910.

Fairmount trustees decided to phase out and eventually close the institute after the 1915 school year. For 20 years, students of the institute formed the nucleus of Fairmount College's student body.

The school's mascot, the "wheatshockers," came about during a football game in 1906 and referred to the fact that many of the football players also shocked wheat during the harvest.

Amid growing financial troubles in the 1920s, the college's supporters tried to get the city of Wichita to buy it in 1925, but failed. A second referendum passed in 1926, and that fall it became the Municipal University of Wichita (popularly known as "Wichita University" or "WU"). It was the first municipal university west of the Mississippi.

By the 1950s, university leaders and President Harry Corbin explored adding the institution to the State of Kansas Regents System along with the University of Kansas and Kansas State University. These two schools had powerful friends who did not feel that the University of Wichita was on par with the state's two main universities. It took a concerted lobbying effort on the part of WU boosters to persuade the legislature and governor to agree to the change. On July 1, 1964, the school officially entered the state system of higher education as Wichita State University.

Located on campus is the original building of the first Pizza Hut. The original building was located at Kellogg and Bluff. An effort to move it out of the path of Kellogg expansion resulted in the building coming to Wichita State University in the 1980s. After three decades of being located near the campus water tower, the building underwent a second move. In 2017, the university moved it to its current location on the Innovation Campus.

== Campuses ==
The main campus is located at 1845 North Fairmount in northeast Wichita, is mostly bounded between the streets of 17th St N, 21st St N, Hillside St, Oliver Ave. The Hughes Metropolitan Complex and Advanced Education in General Dentistry buildings, located at the intersection of 29th St N and Oliver Ave, are considered part of the main campus. There are seven satellite campuses.

Since July 1, 2018, the Campus of Applied Sciences and Technology, also known as "WSU Tech" and formerly known as the Wichita Area Technical College, is located at 4004 N. Webb Road in Wichita.

== Academics ==
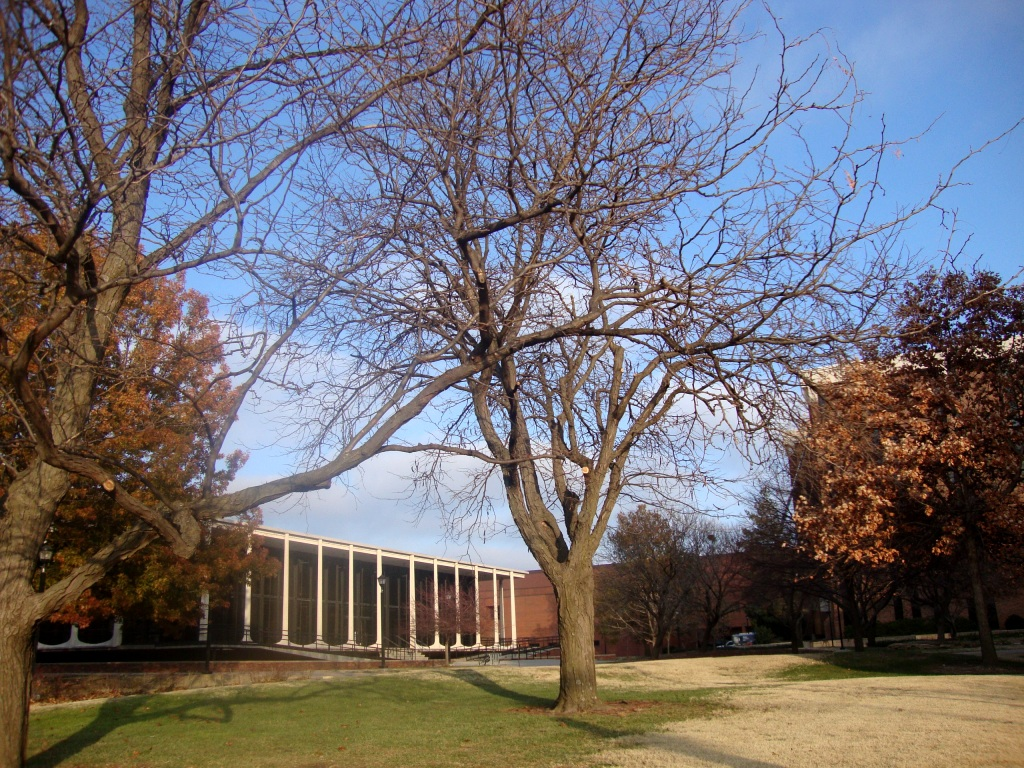
Hubbard Hall (2011)

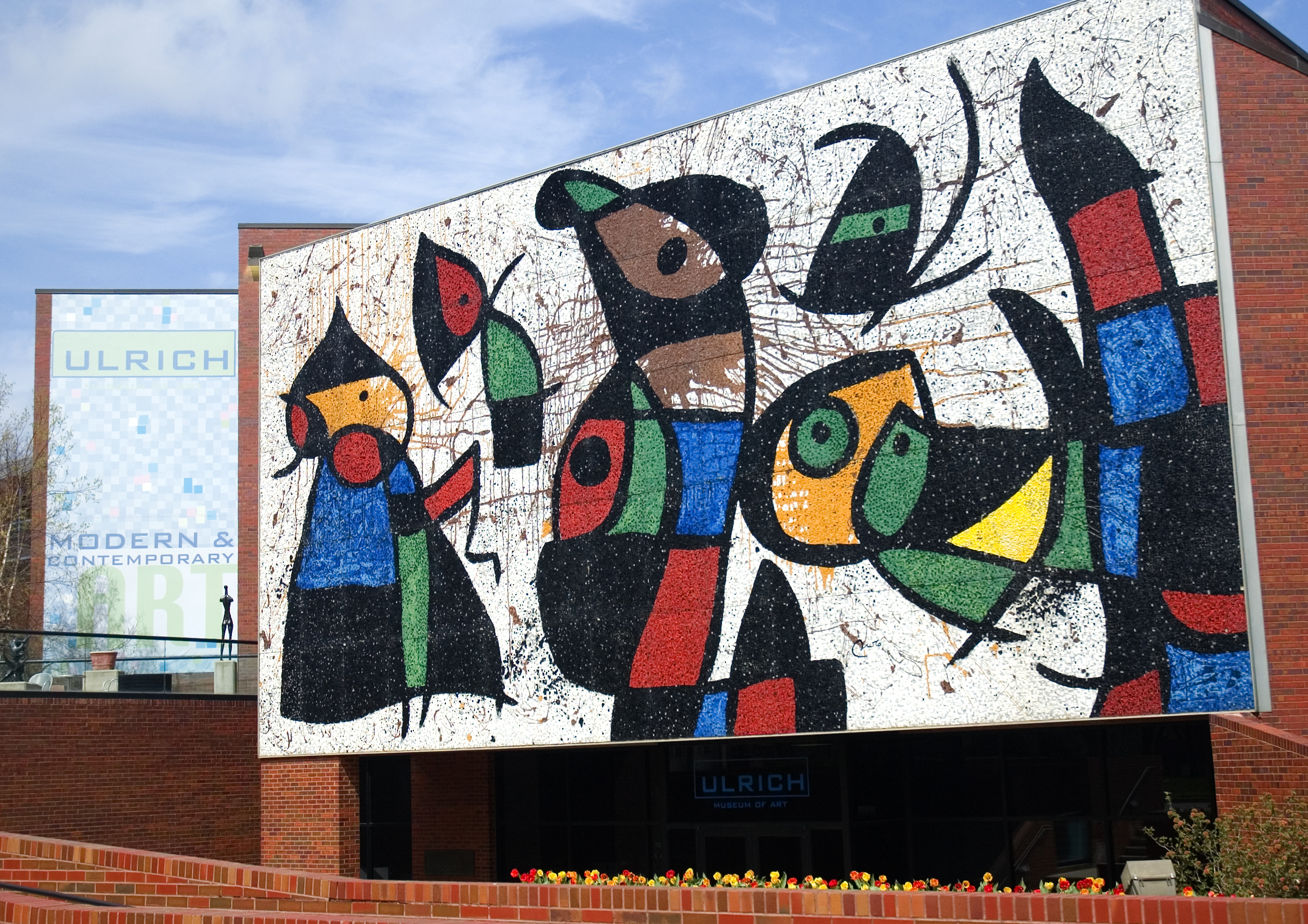
Ulrich Museum of Art (2007)

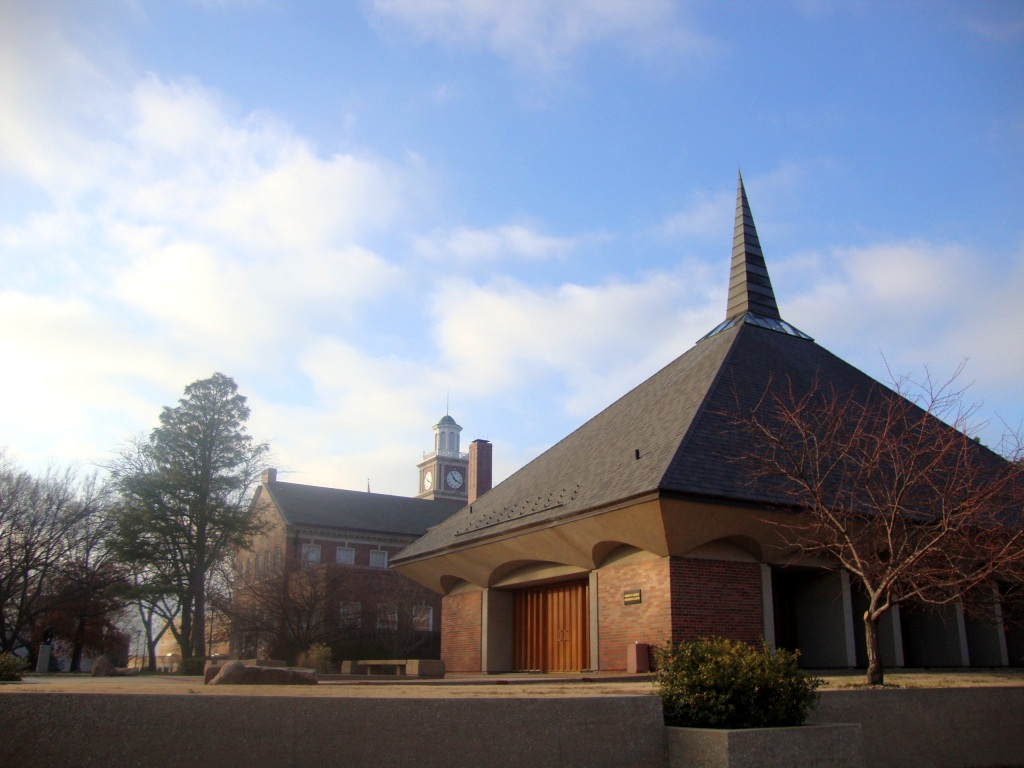
Grace Memorial Chapel (2011)

The university comprises the following academic colleges and schools:

- College of Education (formerly College of Applied Studies)
- College of Engineering
- College of Fine Arts
- College of Health Professions
- Dorothy and Bill Cohen Honors College
- Fairmount College of Liberal Arts and Sciences
- Graduate School
- College of Innovation and Design (Formerly Institute for Interdisciplinary Innovation)
- W. Frank Barton School of Business

The Wichita State University Libraries have holdings of more than 2 million volumes, over 350 electronic databases and more than 70,000 journal subscriptions. The University Libraries consist of the main Ablah Library, the McKinley Chemistry Library, the Thurlow Lieurance Music Library and University Libraries Special Collections and University Archives. The libraries are open to community users and serve as a regional United States Federal Government Documents Depository, a State of Kansas Government Documents Depository, and is the State of Kansas' only Patents and Trademarks Library. WSU Special Collections and University Archives contains numerous rare books, incunabula, historical manuscripts collections, maps and photographic archives documenting Kansas history, as well as hosting the Wichita Photo Archives. The library faculty offer workshops throughout the year to students and community members.

== Innovation Campus ==
In 2014, President John Bardo announced plans to launch a major academic and student life initiative, dubbed the "Innovation Campus." The plan includes public/private partnerships with domestic and international companies that would build offices on the WSU main campus and collaborate with the students and faculty on research projects and product development through a technology transfer system. The plan kicked off with the completion of renovations to the university's student union, the Rhatigan Student Center, and the opening of Shocker Hall, a new 318,000-square-foot, 784-bed housing facility on the main campus. Subsequent development has taken place on the site of the former Braeburn Golf Course, a WSU-owned course adjacent to campus which closed in November 2014. Ground broke on the first building, the Technology Transfer/Experiential Learning Building, in Q1 2015. The university has secured on-campus partnerships with multiple companies including Sunnyvale, Calif.-based NetApp, which moved its entire Wichita operations into a new building on campus; Airbus; Deloitte; Textron Aviation; Boston Consulting Group; and Dassault Systèmes to name a few. The Innovation Campus has added more than 15 buildings to campus, including Woolsey Hall, a new building for the Frank W. Barton School of Business; a new residence hall; commercial offices; "creative collision" facilities; two mixed-use developments and a hotel.

== Wichita Biomedical Campus ==
In October 2022, President Richard Muma announced that Wichita State University, WSU Tech and the University of Kansas were moving forward with plans to build an approximately 470,000‑square‑foot, $300 million shared biomedical campus in the heart of downtown Wichita. The project, later dubbed the Wichita Biomedical Campus, would create a centrally located corridor where health care services, education, research and technology can be established near existing private hospitals and health care providers. In April 2023, the Kansas Legislature set aside $142 million in federal American Rescue Plan Act of 2021 funds. Construction began in 2024.

== Student life ==
Undergraduate demographics as of Fall 2023
Race and ethnicity	Total
White	57%
Hispanic	17%
Asian	8%
Black	6%
Two or more races	6%
International student	4%
Unknown	2%
American Indian/Alaska Native	1%
Economic diversity
Low-income (Note: The percentage of students who received an income-based federal Pell grant intended for low-income students.)	35%
Affluent (Note: The percentage of students who are a part of the American middle class at the bare minimum.)	65%

=== Fraternities and sororities ===
There are 26 fraternities and sororities, 10 have off-campus buildings, and 7 are lived-in.

Fraternity buildings:

- Beta Theta Pi
- Delta Upsilon
- Phi Delta Theta
- Sigma Alpha Epsilon
- Sigma Phi Epsilon

Sorority buildings:

- Alpha Phi
- Delta Delta Delta
- Delta Gamma
- Gamma Phi Beta
- Kappa Kappa Gamma

=== Housing ===
Current:

- Shocker Hall - freshman coed dorms (by suite), D-shape four five-story buildings (800 bed) with attached dining hall and coffee shop, located between Crossland Stadium and Morrison Hall, opened in 2014.
- The Suites - freshman coed dorms (by suite), L-shape four-story building (225 bed), located southeast of "The Flats", opened in 2019.
- The Flats - upperclassmen coed apartments (by suite), two four-story buildings (286 bed), located between Eck Stadium and Woolsey Hall, opened in 2017 as privately owned.

Previous:

- Brennan Hall I / II / III (demolished), Fairmount Towers (demolished), Grace Wilkie Hall (repurposed), Wheatshocker Hall (demolished).

Early:

- Fiske Hall (repurposed), Holyoke Cottage (home), Holyoke Hall (demolished).

== Athletics ==
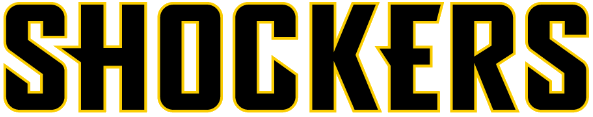

The Wichita State (WSU) athletic teams are called the Shockers. The university is a member of the NCAA Division I ranks, primarily competing in the American Conference (The American) since the 2017–18 academic year. (Women's bowling competes in Conference USA.) WSU competes in 16 intercollegiate athletic sports: Men's sports include baseball, basketball, cross country, golf, tennis and track & field (indoor and outdoor); while women's sports include basketball, bowling, cross country, golf, softball, tennis, track & field (indoor and outdoor) and volleyball. Also, it offers club sports such as crew, bowling, shooting sports, and other intramural sports.

=== Shockers ===
The name for WSU's athletic teams is the Shockers and students are also collectively referred to as "Shockers." The name reflects the university's heritage: Early students earned money by shocking, or harvesting, wheat in nearby fields. Early football games were played on a stubbled wheat field. Pep club members were known as Wheaties. Tradition has it that in 1904, football manager and student R.J. Kirk came up with the nickname Wheatshockers. Although the Wheatshockers name was never officially adopted by the university, it caught on and survived until it was later shortened to Shockers. Until 1948, the university used a nameless shock of wheat as its symbol. WuShock came to life when junior Wilbur Elsea won the Kappa Pi honorary society's competition to design a mascot typifying the spirit of the school. The October 7, 1948, issue of The Sunflower, the student newspaper, ran an advertisement urging students to submit names for the school's new mascot. The winning name was "WuShock."

During the 1980s, WuShock briefly had a sidekick named WeeShock, that was introduced as an attempt to make the mascot more appealing to children.

In 1998, WuShock, also referred to as "Wu," marked his 50th birthday by undergoing a redesign and getting a pumped-up physique and revved-up attitude. The mascot's costume has changed over the years, as well. With the redesign, a new costume was introduced in fall 1998. In fall 1999, the head of the new costume underwent another redesign after a number of supporters suggested the mascot needed a more intimidating look. In 2006 it was decided to once again update the Wu costume. The general consensus was that many wanted the costume to more accurately reflect the depiction of WU in the school's logo. The new WuShock now has the ability to run, jump, and walk up stairs without help. Many officials feel that a more professional and intimidating mascot on the field will certainly bolster WSU's image.

=== Basketball ===
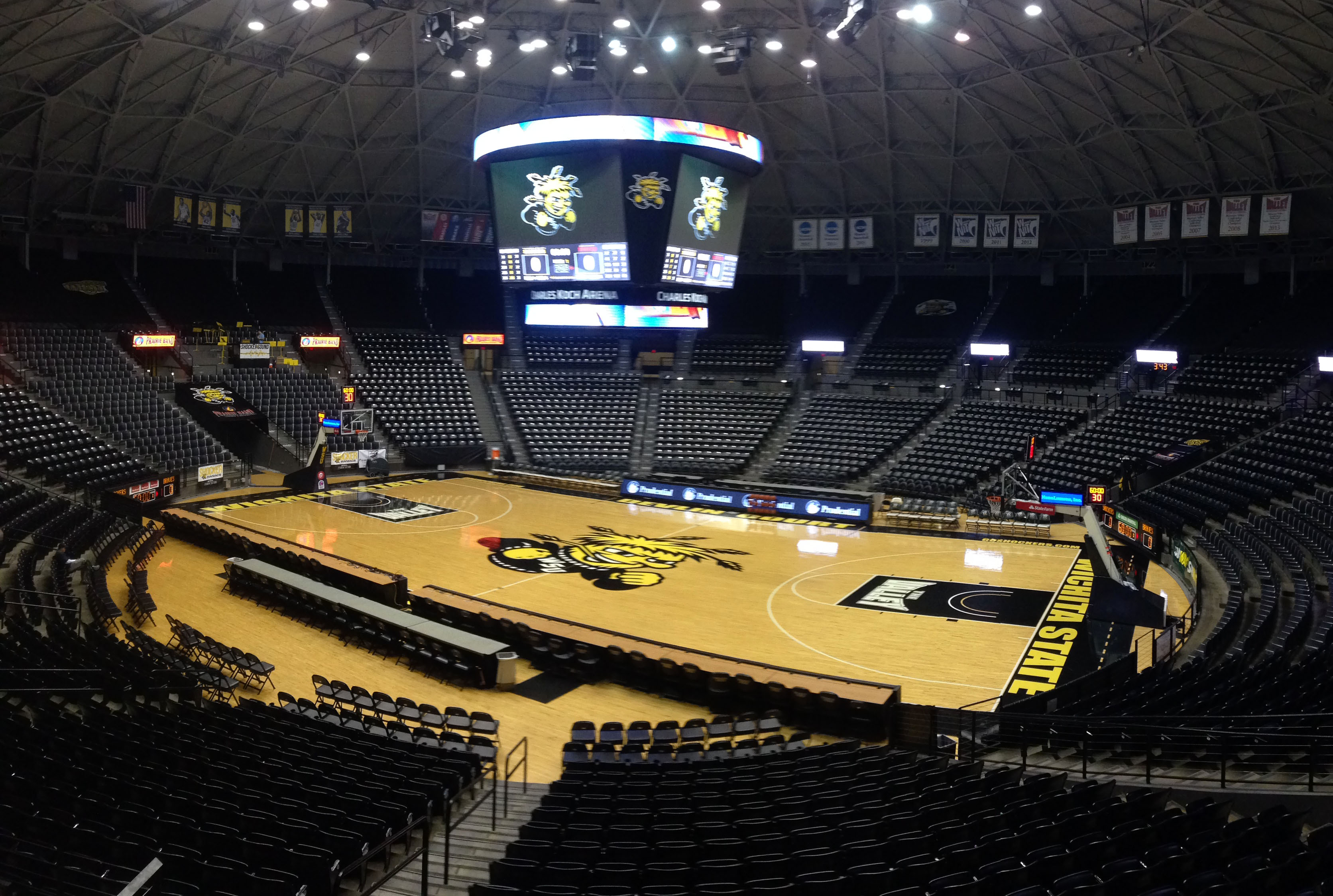
Charles Koch Arena is home to the Wichita State Shockers men's and women's basketball and women's volleyball teams. (2016)

The men's basketball team has played in the NCAA tournament 16 times since 1954, advancing to the Final Four in 1965 and 2013, the Elite Eight in 1981, and the Sweet Sixteen in 2006 and 2015, and also entering the 2014 NCAA tournament unbeaten. The team also won the 2011 National Invitation Tournament Championship, beating the Alabama Crimson Tide. The Shockers have five alumni currently playing in the NBA in Fred VanVleet, Landry Shamet, Tyson Etienne, Austin Reaves and Craig Porter Jr. Other Wichita State products who have played in the league include All-Star Xavier McDaniel, power forwards Antoine Carr, Cliff Levingston, Cleanthony Early, two-time All-American Dave Stallworth, centers Gene Wiley, Greg Dreiling and Jaime Echenique, guards Gal Mekel, Toure' Murry, and Ron Baker. Four-time All-American Cleo Littleton joined the Shocks in 1951, breaking the unofficial color barrier in the Missouri Valley Conference.

=== Baseball ===
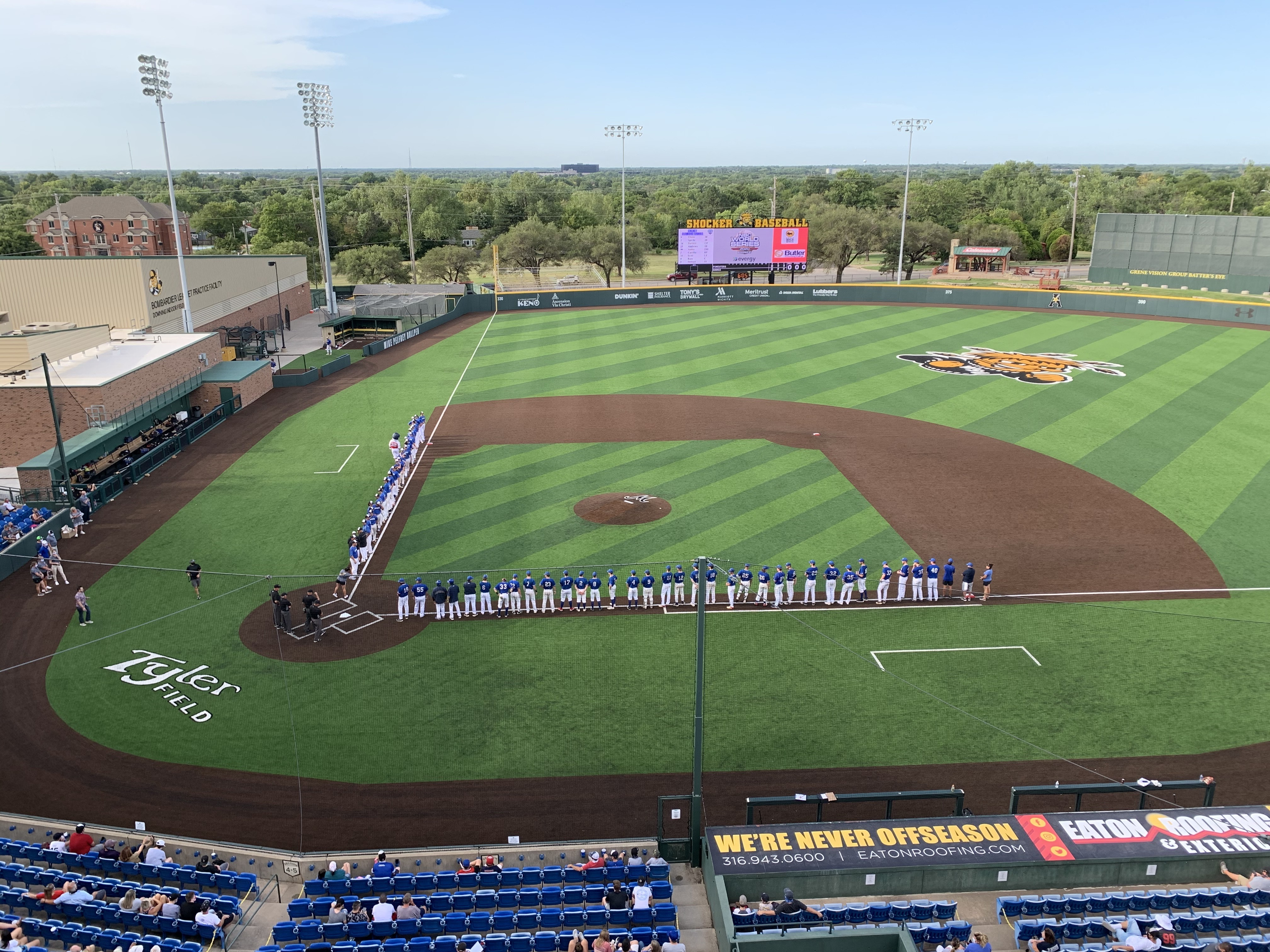
Eck Stadium, Home of Tyler Field at Gene Stephenson Park is the home of the Wichita State University Shockers baseball team.

The men's baseball team is college baseball's highest winning team for the past 31 years, with numerous conference championships and NCAA tournament appearances. The baseball team won the national championship in 1989 and was runner-up in 1982, 1991 and 1993. They play at Eck Stadium.

=== Bowling ===
The men's and women's bowling teams have won 23 combined USBC Intercollegiate Team Championships, including the men's 2003, 2008, 2009 and 2010 title and the women's 2005, 2007 and 2009 title. The women's team became an NCAA sport for the 2024-25 season.

=== Football ===
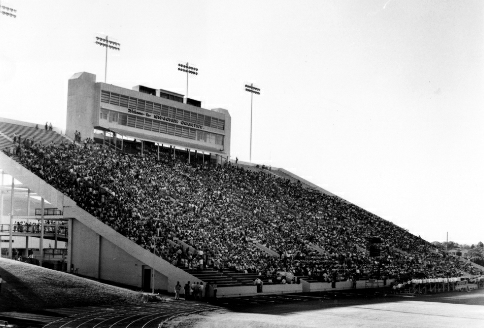
Crossland Stadium west bleachers (1978)

In 1897, Fairmount College played its first football game. In 1905, the Coleman Company set up gas-powered lighting for a night game against Cooper College (now Sterling College), which became the first night football game played west of the Mississippi River. In 1905, there was an experimental game against Washburn College (now Washburn University) that had three new rules: 1) increase first down requirement from 5 yards to 10 yards, 2) allowing forward passes (suggestion came from President Theodore Roosevelt), 3) varying points (4/5/6) for a field goal kick based on the distance.

The school discontinued its football program following the 1986 season due to financial debts, NCAA recruiting violations, and WSU students voting against raising fees to pay for higher football expenses. It had never fully recovered from losing 16 starters, its athletic director, football coach, and many others vital to the WSU program in a plane crash in 1970 (see below). Legendary NFL coach Bill Parcells was a linebacker at WSU in 1962 and 1963 before serving as a graduate assistant in 1964. Wichita State University was also the first Division I-A school to hire a black head coach in college football, Willie Jeffries, in 1979.

==== 1970 plane crash ====
On October 2, 1970, a plane carrying players and staff of the WSU football team took off from a Colorado airport after refueling and was bound for Logan, Utah for a game against Utah State University. It flew into a mountain valley too narrow to enable it to turn back and smashed into a mountainside, killing 31 of the 40 players, administrators, and fans near a ski resort 40 miles (64 km) away from Denver.

== Notable alumni and faculty ==
Many notable businessmen have studied at WSU, including the founders of Pizza Hut Dan and Frank Carney, and Garmin founder Gary Burrell. Notable scientists include Mona Nemer, who served as the Canadian Chief Science Advisor. Notable engineers include Harold G. White, lead in NASA's Advanced Propulsion Physics Laboratory, and Dwane Wallace, President and Chairman of Cessna. In the arts, graduates included opera stars Joyce DiDonato and Samuel Ramey, actor Shirley Knight and Broadway performer Karla Burns. In athletics, notable individuals include basketball players Antoine Carr and Fred VanVleet, as well as Pro Football Hall of Fame coach Bill Parcells. Notable politicians include Femi Pedro, Ambassador of the Federal Republic of Nigeria to Australia, New Zealand, Fiji, Solomon Islands and the Oceanic States, U.S. Representative Garner E. Shriver, the U.S. diplomat Robert D. Blackwill and Indonesian politician Sandiaga Uno. U.S. Army captain Riley L. Pitts, who graduated with a degree in journalism, was the first African American to receive the Medal of Honor.
