= Drake Bulldogs men's basketball statistical leaders =

The Drake Bulldogs men's basketball statistical leaders are individual statistical leaders of the Drake Bulldogs men's basketball program in various categories, including points, assists, blocks, rebounds, and steals. Within those areas, the lists identify single-game, single-season, and career leaders. The Bulldogs represent the Drake University in the NCAA's Missouri Valley Conference.

Drake began competing in intercollegiate basketball in 1906. However, the school's record book does not generally list records from before the 1950s, as records from before this period are often incomplete and inconsistent. Since scoring was much lower in this era, and teams played much fewer games during a typical season, it is likely that few or no players from this era would appear on these lists anyway.

The NCAA did not officially record assists as a stat until the 1983–84 season, and blocks and steals until the 1985–86 season, but Drake's record books includes players in these stats before these seasons. These lists are updated through the end of the 2024–25 season. Players with performances during the 2024–25 season are displayed in bold.

== Scoring ==
Career
Rk	Player	Points	Seasons
1	Reed Timmer	2,000	2014–15 2015–16 2016–17 2017–18
2	Tucker DeVries	1,867	2021–22 2022–23 2023–24
3	Josh Young	1,789	2006–07 2007–08 2008–09 2009–10
4	Red Murrell	1,657	1955–56 1956–57 1957–58
5	Melvin Mathis	1,651	1982–83 1983–84 1984–85 1985–86
6	Willie McCarter	1,626	1966–67 1967–68 1968–69
7	Lewis Lloyd	1,577	1979–80 1980–81
8	D.J. Wilkins	1,565	2018–19 2019–20 2020–21 2021–22 2022–23
9	Lynnrick Rogers	1,546	1993–94 1994–95 1995–96 1996–97
10	Wayne Kreklow	1,471	1975–76 1976–77 1977–78 1978–79

Season
Rk	Player	Points	Season
1	Lewis Lloyd	815	1979–80
2	Lewis Lloyd	762	1980–81
3	Tucker DeVries	734	2023–24
4	**Bennett Stirtz**	673	2024–25
5	Jalen Quinn	669	2025–26
6	Red Murrell	668	1957–58
7	Willie McCarter	633	1968–69
8	Tucker DeVries	631	2022–23
9	Willie McCarter	603	1967–68
10	Curt Smith	591	1992–93

Single game
Rk	Player	Points	Season	Opponent
1	Red Murrell	51	1957–58	Houston
2	Lewis Lloyd	47	1979–80	UW-Superior
3	Red Murrell	45	1956–57	Wichita
4	Wayne Kreklow	43	1978–79	Memphis State
	Lewis Lloyd	43	1980–81	Wichita State
6	Lewis Lloyd	42	1980–81	Oral Roberts
7	Red Murrell	41	1955–56	Saint Louis
	Lewis Lloyd	41	1979–80	Tulsa
	Lewis Lloyd	41	1980–81	Creighton
	Kale Abrahamson	41	2015–16	Western Kentucky

== Rebounds ==
Career
Rk	Player	Rebounds	Seasons
1	Garrett Sturtz	917	2018–19 2019–20 2020–21 2021–22 2022–23
2	Darnell Brodie	915	2020–21 2021–22 2022–23 2023–24
3	Melvin Mathis	854	1982–83 1983–84 1984–85 1985–86
4	Jonathan Cox	818	2005–06 2006–07 2007–08 2008–09
5	Sam Roark	792	1986–87 1987–88 1988–89 1989–90
6	Greg Danielson	735	1999–2000 2000–01 2001–02 2002–03
7	Al Williams	731	1967–68 1968–69 1969–70
8	Bob Netolicky	717	1963–64 1964–65 1965–66 1966–67
9	Ken Harris	702	1973–74 1974–75 1975–76 1976–77
10	Willie Cerf	699	1953–54 1954–55 1955–56

Season
Rk	Player	Rebounds	Season
1	Lewis Lloyd	406	1979–80
2	Tom Bush	369	1970–71
3	Al Williams	363	1969–70
4	Willie Wise	343	1968–69
5	McCoy McLemore	321	1963–64
6	Tom Bush	303	1969–70
7	Bob Netolicky	299	1966–67
8	Marv Torrence	298	1960–61
9	Dennis Bell	297	1972–73
10	Red Murrell	294	1956–57

Single game
Rk	Player	Rebounds	Season	Opponent
1	Ken Harris	26	1976–77	Tulsa
2	Dave Terre	25	1959–60	North Texas
3	Al Williams	23	1969–70	North Texas
4	Sam Roark	22	1987–88	Southern Illinois
	Leon Huff	22	1971–72	Butler
	Willie Cerf	22	1955–56	Nebraska-Omaha
	Dave Terre	22	1959–60	North Texas

== Assists ==
Career
Rk	Player	Assists	Seasons
1	Roman Penn	621	2019–20 2020–21 2021–22 2022–23
2	Glenn Martin	384	1984–85 1985–86 1986–87 1987–88
3	Lonnie Randolph	382	2001–02 2002–03 2003–04 2004–05
4	Stephfon Butler	378	1981–82 1982–83 1983–84 1984–85
5	D.J. Wilkins	338	2018–19 2019–20 2020–21 2021–22 2022–23
6	Napoleon Gaither	337	1975–76 1976–77 1977–78
7	Ron Caldwell	319	1972–73 1973–74 1974–75
8	Al Stewart	318	2005–06 2006–07
9	Terry Youngbauer	315	1979–80 1980–81 1981–82 1982–83
10	Terry Benka	308	1973–74 1974–75 1975–76 1976–77

Season
Rk	Player	Assists	Season
1	Adam Emmenecker	213	2007–08
2	**Bennett Stirtz**	200	2024–25
3	Roman Penn	192	2019–20
4	Roman Penn	186	2022–23
5	Al Stewart	174	2006–07
6	Terry Benka	156	1976–77
7	Lamont Evans	148	1999–2000
8	Stephfon Butler	147	1984–85
9	Al Stewart	144	2005–06
10	Ron Caldwell	140	1973–74

Single game
Rk	Player	Assists	Season	Opponent
1	Roman Penn	18	2022–23	Evansville
2	Nick Norton	17	2018–19	N. Dakota State
3	Jeff Hill	15	1978–79	Memphis State
	Jeff Hill	15	1979–80	UW-Superior
5	Adam Emmenecker	14	2007–08	Western Kentucky

== Steals ==
Career
Rk	Player	Steals	Seasons
1	Matt Woodley	194	1997–98 1998–99 1999–2000
2	Lonnie Randolph	190	2001–02 2002–03 2003–04 2004–05
3	William Celestine	188	1990–91 1991–92 1992–93 1993–94
4	Lynnrick Rogers	180	1993–94 1994–95 1995–96 1996–97
5	Nick Grant	178	2003–04 2004–05 2005–06 2006–07
	Garrett Sturtz	178	2018–19 2019–20 2020–21 2021–22 2022–23
7	Dan Knuckey	149	1992–93 1993–94 1994–95 1995–96

Season
Rk	Player	Steals	Season
1	Curt Smith	75	1992–93
2	William Celestine	72	1993–94
	**Bennett Stirtz**	72	2024–25
4	Lonnie Randolph	70	2003–04
5	Matt Woodley	68	1998–99
6	Dan Knuckey	66	1995–96
7	Matt Woodley	65	1999–2000
8	Rayvonte Rice	63	2011–12
9	Nick Grant	62	2006–07
10	Matt Woodley	61	1997–98
	Al Stewart	61	2005–06

Single game
Rk	Player	Steals	Season	Opponent
1	Al Stewart	9	2005–06	Illinois State
2	Dan Knuckey	8	1993–94	Simpson
3	Lewis Lloyd	7	1979–80	Creighton
	Al Stewart	7	2005–06	Montana

== Blocks ==
Career
Rk	Player	Blocks	Seasons
1	Nick McGlynn	144	2015–16 2016–17 2017–18 2018–19
2	Liam Robbins	134	2018–19 2019–20
3	Aliou Keita	133	2004–05 2005–06 2006–07
4	Seth VanDeest	114	2009–10 2010–11 2011–12 2012–13
5	Jonathan Cox	89	2005–06 2006–07 2007–08 2008–09
6	Darnell Brodie	83	2020–21 2021–22 2022–23 2023–24
7	Tremell Murphy	80	2018–19 2019–20 2020–21 2021–22
8	Jacob Enevold	74	2013–14 2014–15 2015–16 2016–17
9	Brent Heemskert	73	2004–05 2005–06 2006–07 2007–08 2008–09
10	William Celestine	67	1990–91 1991–92 1992–93 1993–94

Season
Rk	Player	Blocks	Season
1	Liam Robbins	99	2019–20
2	Nick McGlynn	56	2017–18
3	Aliou Keita	55	2004–05
4	Nick McGlynn	53	2018–19
5	Aliou Keita	49	2006–07
6	Seth VanDeest	45	2009–10
7	Lewis Lloyd	41	1979–80
8	Kevin Bennett	40	1994–95
9	Kraidon Woods	39	2011–12
10	Isaiah Carr	37	2025–26

Single game
Rk	Player	Blocks	Season	Opponent
1	Lewis Lloyd	7	1979–80	New Mexico State
	Liam Robbins	7	2019–20	Loyola–Chicago
3	Liam Robbins	6	2018–19	Buena Vista
	Aliou Keita	6	2005–06	Missouri State
