= 1994–95 Southern Illinois Salukis men's basketball team =

American college basketball season

1994–95 Southern Illinois Salukis men's basketball

MVC tournament champion

NCAA tournament
- Conference: Missouri Valley Conference
- Record: 23–9 (13–5 MVC)
- Head coach: Rich Herrin (10th season)
- Home arena: SIU Arena

1994–95 Missouri Valley Conference men's basketball standings
	Conf.				Overall
Team	W		L	PCT	W		L	PCT
Tulsa	15	–	3	.833	24	–	8	.750
Illinois State	13	–	5	.722	20	–	13	.606
Southern Illinois †	13	–	5	.722	23	–	9	.719
Bradley	12	–	6	.667	20	–	10	.667
Evansville	11	–	7	.611	18	–	9	.667
Drake	9	–	9	.500	12	–	15	.444
Southwest Missouri State	9	–	9	.500	16	–	11	.593
Wichita State	6	–	12	.333	13	–	14	.481
Northern Iowa	4	–	14	.222	8	–	20	.286
Creighton	4	–	14	.222	7	–	19	.269
Indiana State	3	–	15	.167	7	–	19	.269
† 1995 MVC tournament winner Rankings from AP Poll

The 1994–95 Southern Illinois Salukis men's basketball team represented Southern Illinois University Carbondale during the 1994–95 NCAA Division I men's basketball season. The Salukis were led by tenth-year head coach Rich Herrin and played their home games at the SIU Arena in Carbondale, Illinois as members of the Missouri Valley Conference. They finished the season 23–9, 13–5 in MVC play to finish in second place. The Salukis won the MVC tournament to receive an automatic bid to the NCAA tournament as No. 10 seed in the Midwest region. The Salukis fell to No. 7 seed Syracuse in the opening round.

== Roster ==
1994–95 Southern Illinois Salukis men's basketball team
Players
Coaches

Pos.	#	Name	Height	Weight	Year	Previous school	Hometown
F		Marcus Timmons	6 ft 8 in (2.03 m)	215 lb (98 kg)	Sr		Sikeston, Missouri
F	43	Chris Carr	6 ft 6 in (1.98 m)	215 lb (98 kg)	Jr		Ironton, Missouri

Head coach

- Rich Herrin

Assistant coach(es)

Legend

- (C) Team captain
- (S) Suspended
- (I) Ineligible
- (W) Walk-on
- Injured
- Current redshirt

Roster

== Schedule and results ==
Date time, TV	Rank^{#}	Opponent^{#}	Result	Record	Site (attendance) city, state
Regular season
Nov 25, 1994*		vs. Seton Hall	L 56–69	0–1	Stan Sheriff Center; Honolulu, Hawaii
Nov 26, 1994*		vs. St. Bonaventure	W 74–72	1–1	Stan Sheriff Center; Honolulu, Hawaii
Dec 3, 1994*		Old Dominion	W 88–74	2–1	SIU Arena; Carbondale, Illinois
Dec 5, 1994*		Saint Louis	L 65–72	2–2	SIU Arena; Carbondale, Illinois
Dec 10, 1994*		at UNC Charlotte	L 70–76	2–3	Independence Arena; Charlotte, North Carolina
Dec 15, 1994*		at Southeast Missouri State	W 74–72	3–3	Show Me Center; Cape Girardeau, Missouri
Dec 17, 1994*		at Austin Peay	W 77–72	4–3	Dunn Center; Clarksville, Tennessee
Dec 19, 1994*		Oral Roberts	W 93–71	5–3	SIU Arena; Carbondale, Illinois
Dec 22, 1994		Missouri Southern State	W 102–47	6–3 (1–0)	SIU Arena; Carbondale, Illinois
Dec 31, 1994*		at James Madison	W 82–80	7–3	JMU Convocation Center; Harrisonburg, Virginia
Jan 26, 1995		at Drake	W 89–68	12–5	Knapp Center; Des Moines, Iowa
Missouri Valley tournament
Mar 4, 1995*		vs. Drake; Quarterfinals	W 85–65	21–8	Kiel Center; St. Louis, Missouri
Mar 5, 1995*		vs. Illinois State; Semifinals	W 72–68	22–8	Kiel Center; St. Louis, Missouri
Mar 6, 1995*		vs. Tulsa; Championship game	W 77–62	23–8	Kiel Center; St. Louis, Missouri
NCAA tournament
Mar 17, 1995*	(10 MW)	vs. (7 MW) No. 25 Syracuse; First round	L 92–96	23–9	Frank Erwin Center; Austin, Texas
*Non-conference game. ^{#}Rankings from AP poll. (#) Tournament seedings in parentheses. MW=Midwest. All times are in Central Time.
