= 2008–09 Central Michigan Chippewas men's basketball team =

American college basketball season

2008–09 Central Michigan Chippewas men's basketball

MAC West Division Co-Champions
- Conference: Mid-American Conference
- West
- Record: 2-5 (0-0 MAC)
- Head coach: Ernie Ziegler
- Home arena: Daniel P. Rose Center

2008–09 Mid-American Conference men's basketball standings
| | Conf. | | | | Overall |
| Team | W | | L | PCT | W | | L | PCT |
|---|---|---|---|---|---|---|---|---|
East
| Bowling Green | 11 | – | 5 | .688 | 19 | – | 14 | .576 |
| Buffalo | 11 | – | 5 | .688 | 21 | – | 12 | .636 |
| Miami | 10 | – | 6 | .625 | 17 | – | 13 | .567 |
| Akron † | 10 | – | 6 | .625 | 23 | – | 13 | .639 |
| Kent State | 10 | – | 6 | .625 | 19 | – | 15 | .559 |
| Ohio | 7 | – | 9 | .438 | 15 | – | 17 | .469 |
West
| Ball State | 7 | – | 9 | .438 | 14 | – | 17 | .452 |
| Central Michigan | 7 | – | 9 | .438 | 12 | – | 19 | .387 |
| Western Michigan | 7 | – | 9 | .438 | 10 | – | 21 | .323 |
| Eastern Michigan | 6 | – | 10 | .375 | 8 | – | 24 | .250 |
| Northern Illinois | 5 | – | 11 | .313 | 10 | – | 20 | .333 |
| Toledo | 5 | – | 11 | .313 | 7 | – | 25 | .219 |
† Conference tournament winner Rankings from AP Poll

== 2008-09 Results ==
| Date | Opponent | Result | Record |
| Nov. 8 | Marygrove (Exhibition) | W 75-55 | - |
| Nov. 14 | Princeton | W 55-53 | 1-0 |
| Nov. 17 | Missouri State | L 57-60 | 1-1 |
| Nov. 20 | at Chicago State | L 74-84 | 1-2 |
| Nov. 22 | Wright State | W 70-68 (OT) | 2-2 |
| Nov. 29 | at Illinois-Chicago | L 74-84 | 2-3 |
| Dec. 2 | at Marquette | L 67-81 | 2-4 |
| Dec. 6 | at Cal State Fullerton | L 65-79 | 2-5 |
| Dec. 15 | Alcorn State | W 74-66 | 3-5 |
| Dec. 17 | Illinois State | L 71-69 | 3-6 |
| Dec. 20 | Robert Morris | L 60-73 | 3-7 |
