= Chris Carr (basketball) =

American basketball player (born 1974)

Drury Panthers
- Title: Assistant coach
- Conference: Great Lakes Valley Conference

Personal information
- Born: March 12, 1974 (age 52) Ironton, Missouri, U.S.
- Listed height: 6 ft 6 in (1.98 m)
- Listed weight: 220 lb (100 kg)

Career information
- High school: Arcadia Valley (Ironton, Missouri)
- College: Southern Illinois (1992–1995)
- NBA draft: 1995: 2nd round, 56th overall pick
- Drafted by: Phoenix Suns
- Playing career: 1995–2003
- Position: Shooting guard
- Number: 8, 43
- Coaching career: 2010–present

Career history

Playing
- 1995–1996: Phoenix Suns
- 1996–1999: Minnesota Timberwolves
- 1999: New Jersey Nets
- 1999: Golden State Warriors
- 2000: Chicago Bulls
- 2000–2001: Boston Celtics
- 2001–2002: AEK Athens
- 2002–2003: Lavovi 063

Coaching
- 2010–2015: Eden Prairie HS
- 2015–2021: Kansas State (women's) (assistant)
- 2021–present: Drury (assistant)

Career highlights
- As player: Greek League All-Star (2002); MVC Player of the Year (1995); First-team All-MVC (1995); MVC Tournament MVP (1995)

Career NBA statistics
- Points: 1,988 (6.7 ppg)
- Rebounds: 658 (2.2 rpg)
- Assists: 294 (1.0 apg)
- Stats at NBA.com
- Stats at Basketball Reference

Christopher Dean Carr (born March 12, 1974) is an American former professional basketball player and current assistant basketball coach at Drury University. During his professional career, Carr competed in the 1997 edition of the NBA Slam Dunk Contest, where he reached the final round before losing to Kobe Bryant.

Carr has a son, Cameron Carr, who plays in the NBA for the Los Angeles Lakers.

== Early life ==
Carr attended Arcadia Valley High School, in Ironton, Missouri, where he played high school basketball.

== College career ==
Carr played college basketball for the Southern Illinois Salukis, from 1992 to 1995. He won the MVC Tournament championship in 1994 and 1995. He was also a Missouri Valley Conference Tournament All-Tournament Team selection in both 1994 and 1995.

Carr was also the Missouri Valley Conference Tournament's MVP in 1995. In 1995, Carr was also the Missouri Valley Conference's scoring leader, with a scoring average of 22.0 points per game. He was also named the 1995 Missouri Valley Conference Player of the Year.

Carr was inducted into the Southern Illinois Salukis Hall of Fame in 2006.

== Professional career ==
Carr was selected by the Phoenix Suns, in the second round of the 1995 NBA draft, with the 56th overall draft pick. In 1997 he competed in and subsequently lost in the 1st round of the NBA Slam Dunk competition. He played six seasons in the NBA, with the Phoenix Suns, Minnesota Timberwolves, New Jersey Nets, Golden State Warriors, Chicago Bulls and Boston Celtics. After that, he played professionally in the Greek Basket League with AEK Athens, and with the Serbian and Montenegrin League club Lavovi 063.

== Coaching career ==
After he retired from playing professional club basketball, Carr began working as a basketball coach. In 2003, he created a basketball training academy called 43 Hoops, located in Hopkins, Minnesota. From 2010 to 2015, he worked as the head coach of Eden Prairie High School's girls varsity. He had a win/loss record of 106–34.

He then worked as an assistant coach with the Kansas State Women's Wildcats, from 2015 to 2021. After that, he began working as an assistant coach with the Drury Men's Panthers, in 2021.
