= 2008–09 Northern Iowa Panthers men's basketball team =

American college basketball season

2008–09 Northern Iowa Panthers men's basketball

MVC Regular Season Co-Champions MVC tournament champions

NCAA tournament, First round
- Conference: Missouri Valley Conference
- Record: 23–11 (14–4 MVC)
- Head coach: Ben Jacobson (3rd season)
- Assistant coaches: Kyle Green; P.J. Hogan; Ben Johnson
- Home arena: McLeod Center

2008–09 Missouri Valley Conference men's basketball standings
	Conf.				Overall
Team	W		L	PCT	W		L	PCT
Northern Iowa †	14	–	4	.778	23	–	11	.676
Creighton	14	–	4	.778	27	–	8	.771
Illinois State	11	–	7	.611	24	–	10	.706
Bradley	10	–	8	.556	21	–	15	.583
Southern Illinois	8	–	10	.444	13	–	18	.419
Evansville	8	–	10	.444	17	–	14	.548
Wichita State	8	–	10	.444	17	–	17	.500
Drake	7	–	11	.389	17	–	16	.515
Indiana State	7	–	11	.389	11	–	21	.344
Missouri State	3	–	15	.167	11	–	20	.355
† Missouri Valley Conference tournament winner As of April 1, 2009; Rankings from AP Poll

The 2008–09 Northern Iowa Panthers men's basketball team represented University of Northern Iowa in the 2008-09 NCAA Division I men's basketball season. The team, which played in the Missouri Valley Conference (MVC), was led by third-year head coach Ben Jacobson. In 2007–08, the Panthers finished 18–14 (9–9 in the MVC).

== Pre-season ==
Northern Iowa played two games during the preseason. They faced Dubuque and Wayne State at home.

== Regular season ==
On January 31, 2009, the Panthers tied a school record for the most consecutive wins with a 61–57 victory over Indians State. The record tied the 1963–1964 State College of Iowa Panthers team. On February 2, 2008, Northern Iowa received 1 point in the AP Top 25 poll which had them ranked 45th. On March 9, 2008, Northern Iowa received 3 points in the AP Top 25 poll which had them ranked T-37th.

== Roster ==
Note: Flags indicate national team eligibility at FIBA sanctioned events. Players may hold other non-FIBA nationality not displayed.

No.		Position	Player
5	(United States)	G	Ali Farokhmanesh
10	(United States)	G	Brian Haak
11	(United States)	G	Kwadzo Ahelegbe
13	(United States)	G	Johnny Moran
15	(United States)	G	Jon Montgomery
20	(United States)	F	Jake Koch
21	(United States)	G	Travis Brown
22	(United States)	G	Kerwin Dunham

No.		Position	Player
25	(United States)	G	Carlton Reed
32	(United States)	F	Lucas O'Rear
33	(United States)	C	Austin Pehl
34	(United States)	F	Adam Koch
43	(United States)	F	Adam Rodenberg
52	(United States)	G	Anthony James
53	(United States)	C	Jordan Eglseder

== Schedule ==
Missouri Valley Conference Standing: T-1st
Date	Opponent*	Rank*	Location	Time^{#}	Result	Overall	Conference
**Exhibition Games**
November 4, 2008	Dubuque		Cedar Falls, IA	7:05 p.m.	W 69–51	1–0	0–0
November 10, 2008	Wayne State		Cedar Falls, IA	7:05 p.m.	W 44–27	2–0	0–0
**Regular Season Games**
November 15, 2008	Denver		Cedar Falls, IA	12:05 p.m.	W 61–56	1–0	0–0
November 19, 2008	Illinois Chicago		Chicago, IL	7:00 p.m.	L 84–77	1–1	0–0
November 23, 2008	Texas Southern		Cedar Falls, IA	4:05 p.m.	W 74–67	2–1	0–0
November 25, 2008	Chicago State		Cedar Falls, IA	8:05 p.m.	W 81–70	3–1	0–0
November 28, 2008	#15 Marquette		Hoffman Estates, IL	7:30 p.m.	L 73–43	3–2	0–0
November 29, 2008	Auburn		Hoffman Estates, IL	4:30 p.m.	W 67–61	4–2	0–0
December 3, 2008	Iowa State		Cedar Falls, IA	8:05 p.m.	L 71–66	4–3	0–0
December 6, 2008	North Dakota		Cedar Falls, IA	3:05 p.m.	W 69–49	5–3	0–0
December 9, 2008	Iowa		Iowa City, IA	6:05 p.m.	L 65–46	5–4	0–0
December 13, 2008	Wyoming		Casper, WY	4:30 p.m.	L 74–65	5–5	0–0
December 21, 2008	South Dakota State		Cedar Falls, IA	1:05 p.m.	W 72–55	6–5	0–0
December 28, 2008	**Indiana State**		Cedar Falls, IA	1:05 p.m.	L 85–84	6–6	0–1
December 31, 2008	**Southern Illinois**		Carbondale, IL	7:05 p.m.	W 59–51	7–6	1–1
January 3, 2009	**Wichita State**		Cedar Falls, IA	7:05 p.m.	W 78–54	8–6	2–1
January 6, 2009	**Creighton**		Omaha, NE	7:05 p.m.	W 69–66	9–6	3–1
January 10, 2009	**Missouri State**		Cedar Falls, IA	7:05 p.m.	W 78–64	10–6	4–1
January 13, 2009	**Evansville**		Evansville, IN	7:05 p.m.	W 58–47	11–6	5–1
January 17, 2009	**Drake**		Des Moines, IA	11:05 a.m.	W 81–59	12–6	6–1
January 21, 2009	**Bradley**		Cedar Falls, IA	7:05 p.m.	W 66–61	13–6	7–1
January 25, 2009	**Missouri State**		Springfield, MO	6:05 p.m.	W 78–69	14–6	8–1
January 28, 2009	**Illinois State**		Cedar Falls, IA	7:05 p.m.	W 59–55	15–6	9–1
January 31, 2009	**Indiana State**		Terre Haute, IN	12:05 p.m.	W 61–57	16–6	10–1
February 3, 2009	**Bradley**		Peoria, IL	7:05 p.m.	W 61–58	17–6	11–1
February 8, 2009	**Creighton**		Cedar Falls, IA	1:05 p.m.	L 77–71	17–7	11–2
February 11, 2009	**Southern Illinois**		Cedar Falls, IA	7:05 p.m.	W 81–55	18–7	12–2
February 14, 2009	**Wichita State**		Wichita, KS	7:05 p.m.	L 69–61	18–8	12–3
February 18, 2009	**Drake**		Cedar Falls, IA	7:05 p.m.	L 47–46	18–9	12–4
February 21, 2009	Siena		Newtonville, NY	2:00 p.m.	L 81–75	18–10	12–4
February 24, 2009	**Illinois State**		Normal, IL	7:05 p.m.	W 69–67	19–10	13–4
February 28, 2009	**Evansville**		Cedar Falls, IA	7:30 p.m.	W 69–62	20–10	14–4
**Missouri Valley Conference tournament**
March 6, 2009	Indiana State		St. Louis, MO	12:05 p.m.	W 73–69	21–10	14–4
March 7, 2009	Bradley		St. Louis, MO	1:35 p.m.	W 76–62	22–10	14–4
March 8, 2009	Illinois State		St. Louis, MO	1:05 p.m.	W 60–57	23–10	14–4
**NCAA tournament**
March 19, 2009	#18 Purdue		Portland, OR	1:30 p.m.	L 61–56	23–11	14–4
*Rank according to ESPN/USA Today Coaches Poll. ^{#}All times are in CST. Conference games in **BOLD**.
