= 1994–95 Illinois State Redbirds men's basketball team =

American college basketball season

1994–95 Illinois State Redbirds men's basketball

NIT, Second Round
- Conference: Missouri Valley Conference
- Record: 20–13 (13–5 MVC)
- Head coach: Kevin Stallings (2nd season)
- Assistant coaches: King Rice; Tom Richardson; Jeff Wulbrun
- Home arena: Redbird Arena

1994–95 Missouri Valley Conference men's basketball standings
	Conf.				Overall
Team	W		L	PCT	W		L	PCT
Tulsa	15	–	3	.833	24	–	8	.750
Illinois State	13	–	5	.722	20	–	13	.606
Southern Illinois †	13	–	5	.722	23	–	9	.719
Bradley	12	–	6	.667	20	–	10	.667
Evansville	11	–	7	.611	18	–	9	.667
Drake	9	–	9	.500	12	–	15	.444
Southwest Missouri State	9	–	9	.500	16	–	11	.593
Wichita State	6	–	12	.333	13	–	14	.481
Northern Iowa	4	–	14	.222	8	–	20	.286
Creighton	4	–	14	.222	7	–	19	.269
Indiana State	3	–	15	.167	7	–	19	.269
† 1995 MVC tournament winner Rankings from AP Poll

The 1994–95 Illinois State Redbirds men's basketball team represented Illinois State University during the 1994–95 NCAA Division I men's basketball season. The Redbirds, led by second year head coach Kevin Stallings, played their home games at Redbird Arena and were a member of the Missouri Valley Conference.

The Redbirds finished the regular season at season 18–11, 13–5 in conference play to finish in a tie for second place with Southern Illinois University. They were seeded second for the conference tournament. They won their quarterfinal game versus Southwest Missouri State University and lost their semifinal game versus Southern Illinois University.

Illinois State received an at-large bid to the National Invitation Tournament (NIT). The Redbirds beat Utah State on the road in overtime in the first round, but lost by three points at home to Washington State in the second round to end at 20–13.

== Roster ==
1994–95 Illinois State Redbirds men's basketball team
Players
Coaches

Pos.	#	Name	Height	Weight	Year	Hometown
G	22	Chad Altadonna	6 ft 3 in (1.91 m)	—	Sr	Centralia, IL
G	12	David Cason	6 ft 0 in (1.83 m)	—	Sr	Baltimore, MD
C	43	Brian Kern	6 ft 9 in (2.06 m)	—	Sr	Vandalia, IL
		Derryl Borden	—	—	Jr
G	25	Antonio Cooper	5 ft 9 in (1.75 m)	—	Jr	Phoenix, IL
G	4	Kevin Lunceford	6 ft 4 in (1.93 m)	—	Jr	Columbus, OH
G	3	Maurice Trotter	6 ft 4 in (1.93 m)	—	Jr	Lawrence, KS
F	13	Kenny Wright	6 ft 5 in (1.96 m)	—	Jr	Indianapolis, IN
F	5	Marcus Franklin	6 ft 7 in (2.01 m)	—	So	Venice, IL
C	35	Rob Gibbons	6 ft 10 in (2.08 m)	—	RS Fr	Rockaway, NJ
F	44	Dan Muller	6 ft 6 in (1.98 m)	—	Fr	Lafayette, IN
F	23	Kenneth Pierson (redshirt)	6 ft 8 in (2.03 m)	—	Fr	Conroe, TX
G	15	Jamar Smiley	5 ft 11 in (1.8 m)	—	Fr	West Hempstead, NY
C	32	LeRoy Watkins (I)	6 ft 7 in (2.01 m)	—	Fr	Chicago, IL

Head coach

- Kevin Stallings (Purdue)

Assistant coach(es)

- King Rice (North Carolina)
- Tom Richardson (Saint Xavier)
- Jeff Wulbrun (Cal State Fullerton)

Legend

- (C) Team captain
- (S) Suspended
- (I) Ineligible
- (W) Walk-on
- Injured
- Current redshirt

== Schedule ==
Date time, TV	Rank^{#}	Opponent^{#}	Result	Record	High points	High rebounds	High assists	Site (attendance) city, state
Exhibition Season
November 15, 1994*; 7:05 pm		Upstate All–Stars						Redbird Arena; Normal, IL
November 21, 1994*; 7:05 pm		Slovakia						Redbird Arena; Normal, IL
Regular Season
November 25, 1994*		vs. Iowa State; Big Island Invitational [Quarterfinal]	L 71–88	0–1	–	–	–	Afook-Chinen Civic Auditorium (300); Hilo, HI
November 26, 1994*		at Hawai'i–Hilo; Big Island Invitational [Consolation Semifinal]	W 80–71	1–1	–	–	–	Afook-Chinen Civic Auditorium (1,550); Hilo, HI
November 27, 1994*		vs. Northern Iowa; Big Island Invitational [Fifth Place]	W 80–70	2–1	–	–	–	Afook-Chinen Civic Auditorium (500); Hilo, HI
December 3, 1994*; 7:05 pm		Wisconsin–Green Bay	L 58–64	2–2	–	–	–	Redbird Arena (6,607); Normal, IL
December 6, 1994*; 7:05 pm		North Carolina–Wilmington	L 71–83	2–3	–	–	–	Redbird Arena (5,850); Normal, IL
December 10, 1994; 7:00 pm, Prime Network		at Evansville	L 51–78	2–4 (0–1)	–	–	–	Roberts Municipal Stadium (10,219); Evansville, IN
December 18, 1994*; 1:05 pm		Virginia Commonwealth	W 77–68	3–4	–	–	–	Redbird Arena (5,538); Normal, IL
December 22, 1994*; 9:30 pm		at Santa Clara	L 63–80	3–5	–	–	–	Harold J. Toso Pavilion (1,024); Santa Clara, CA
December 28, 1994*; 7:05 pm		Saint Mary's	W 82–72	4–5	–	–	–	Redbird Arena (5,231); Normal, IL
December 31, 1994*; 12:35 pm		Northwestern	W 86–68	5–5	–	–	–	Redbird Arena (6,003); Normal, IL
January 3, 1995*; 7:00 pm		at DePaul	L 62–82	5–6	–	–	–	Rosemont Horizon (5,875); Rosemont, IL
January 7, 1995; 7:05 pm		Creighton	W 84–64	6–6 (1–1)	15 – Trotter	7 – Gibbons	5 – Cason, Smiley	Redbird Arena (5,565); Normal, IL
January 11, 1995*; 6:00 pm		at East Carolina	L 57–64	6–7	–	–	–	Williams Arena at Minges Coliseum (5,142); Greenville, NC
January 14, 1995; 2:05 pm		at Creighton	W 68–65	7–7 (2–1)	16 – Wright	8 – Altadonna	7 – Cason	Omaha Civic Auditorium (4,673); Omaha, NE
January 16, 1995; 7:05 pm		at Northern Iowa	L 69–78	7–8 (2–2)	–	–	–	UNI Dome (3,378); Cedar Falls, IA
January 19, 1995; 7:05 pm		Tulsa	W 95–79	8–8 (3–2)	–	–	–	Redbird Arena (6,525); Normal, IL
January 21, 1995; 8:05 pm		Wichita State	W 79–69	9–8 (4–2)	16 – Franklin	7 – Franklin	8 – Cason	Redbird Arena (8,811); Normal, IL
January 25, 1995; 7:05 pm, WEEK		at Bradley	L 83–86	9–9 (4–3)	–	–	–	Carver Arena (10,416); Peoria, IL
January 28, 1995; 11:05 am, Prime Network		at Southern Illinois	W 94–91	10–9 (5–3)	22 – Trotter	6 – Kern, Trotter, Muller	7 – Smiley	SIU Arena (5,322); Carbondale, IL
January 30, 1995; 7:05 pm		Indiana State	W 88–72	11–9 (6–3)	–	–	–	Redbird Arena (7,081); Normal, IL
February 2, 1995; 7:05 pm		at Southwest Missouri State	L 66–74	11–10 (6–4)	–	–	–	John Q. Hammons Student Center (5,433); Springfield, MO
February 4, 1995; 7:30 pm		at Wichita State	W 83–82 ^{OT}	12–10 (7–4)	21 – Altadonna	6 – Muller	9 – Cason	Henry Levitt Arena (6,635); Wichita, KS
February 8, 1995; 7:05 pm		Evansville	W 73–72	13–10 (8–4)	–	–	–	Redbird Arena (6,513); Normal, IL
February 11, 1995; 8:05 pm, WMBD		Bradley	W 70–59	14–10 (9–4)	–	–	–	Redbird Arena (10,317); Normal, IL
February 16, 1995; 7:05 pm		at Drake	L 78–82	14–11 (9–5)	–	–	–	The Knapp Center (4,307); Des Moines, IA
February 18, 1995; 7:05 pm		Southern Illinois	W 104–98 ^{2OT}	15–11 (10–5)	22 – Trotter	10 – Wright	16 – Cason	Redbird Arena (9,170); Normal, IL
February 20, 1995; 7:05 pm		Northern Iowa	W 91–76	16–11 (11–5)	–	–	–	Redbird Arena (7,306); Normal, IL
February 23, 1995; 6:30 pm		at Indiana State	W 72-67	17–11 (12–5)	–	–	–	Hulman Center (4,985); Terre Haute, IN
February 27, 1995; 7:05 pm		Drake	W 66–64	18–11 (13–5)	–	–	–	Redbird Arena (8,156); Normal, IL
Diet Pepsi Missouri Valley Conference {MVC} tournament
March 4, 1995	(2)	vs. (7) Southwest Missouri State; Quarterfinal	W 75–72	19–11	17 – Wright	6 – Wright	7 – Cason	Kiel Center (11,971); St. Louis, MO
March 5, 1995; 4:30 pm, ESPN2	(2)	vs. (3) Southern Illinois; Semifinal	L 68–72	19–12	19 – Trotter	7 – Trotter	7 – Cason	Kiel Center (13,271); St. Louis, MO
National Invitation {NIT} tournament
March 13, 1995		at Utah State; First Round	W 93–87 ^{OT}	20–12	29 – Trotter	6 – Kern	8 – Smiley	Smith Spectrum (10,205); Logan, UT
March 20, 1995		Washington State; Second Round	L 80–83	20–13	17 – Altadonna	7 – Kern	7 – Cason	Redbird Arena (8,751); Normal, IL
*Non-conference game. ^{#}Rankings from AP Poll. (#) Tournament seedings in parentheses. All times are in Central Standard Time.
