= 1995 Missouri Valley Conference men's basketball tournament =

American basketball tournament

- Classification: Division I
- Season: 1994–95
- Teams: 8
- Site: Kiel Center; St. Louis, Missouri
- Champions: Southern Illinois (4th title)
- Winning coach: Rich Herrin (3rd title)
- MVP: Chris Carr (Southern Illinois)

1994–95 Missouri Valley Conference men's basketball standings
	Conf.				Overall
Team	W		L	PCT	W		L	PCT
Tulsa	15	–	3	.833	24	–	8	.750
Illinois State	13	–	5	.722	20	–	13	.606
Southern Illinois †	13	–	5	.722	23	–	9	.719
Bradley	12	–	6	.667	20	–	10	.667
Evansville	11	–	7	.611	18	–	9	.667
Drake	9	–	9	.500	12	–	15	.444
Southwest Missouri State	9	–	9	.500	16	–	11	.593
Wichita State	6	–	12	.333	13	–	14	.481
Northern Iowa	4	–	14	.222	8	–	20	.286
Creighton	4	–	14	.222	7	–	19	.269
Indiana State	3	–	15	.167	7	–	19	.269
† 1995 MVC tournament winner Rankings from AP Poll

The 1995 Missouri Valley Conference men's basketball tournament was played after the conclusion of the 1994–1995 regular season at the Kiel Center in St. Louis, Missouri.

The Southern Illinois Salukis defeated the Tulsa Golden Hurricane in the championship game, 77–62, and as a result won their 4th MVC Tournament title and earned an automatic bid to the 1995 NCAA tournament. Chris Carr of Southern Illinois was named the tournament MVP.

== Bracket ==
Quarterfinals; March 4, 1995
1	Tulsa	77
8	Wichita State	63
4	Bradley	79
5	Evansville	74
2	Illinois State	75
7	Southwest Missouri State	72
3	Southern Illinois	85
6	Drake	65

Semifinals; March 5, 1995
1	Tulsa	89
4	Bradley	80
2	Illinois State	68
3	Southern Illinois	72

Final; March 6, 1995
1	Tulsa	62
3	Southern Illinois	77
