= Liam Robbins =

American basketball player (born 1999)

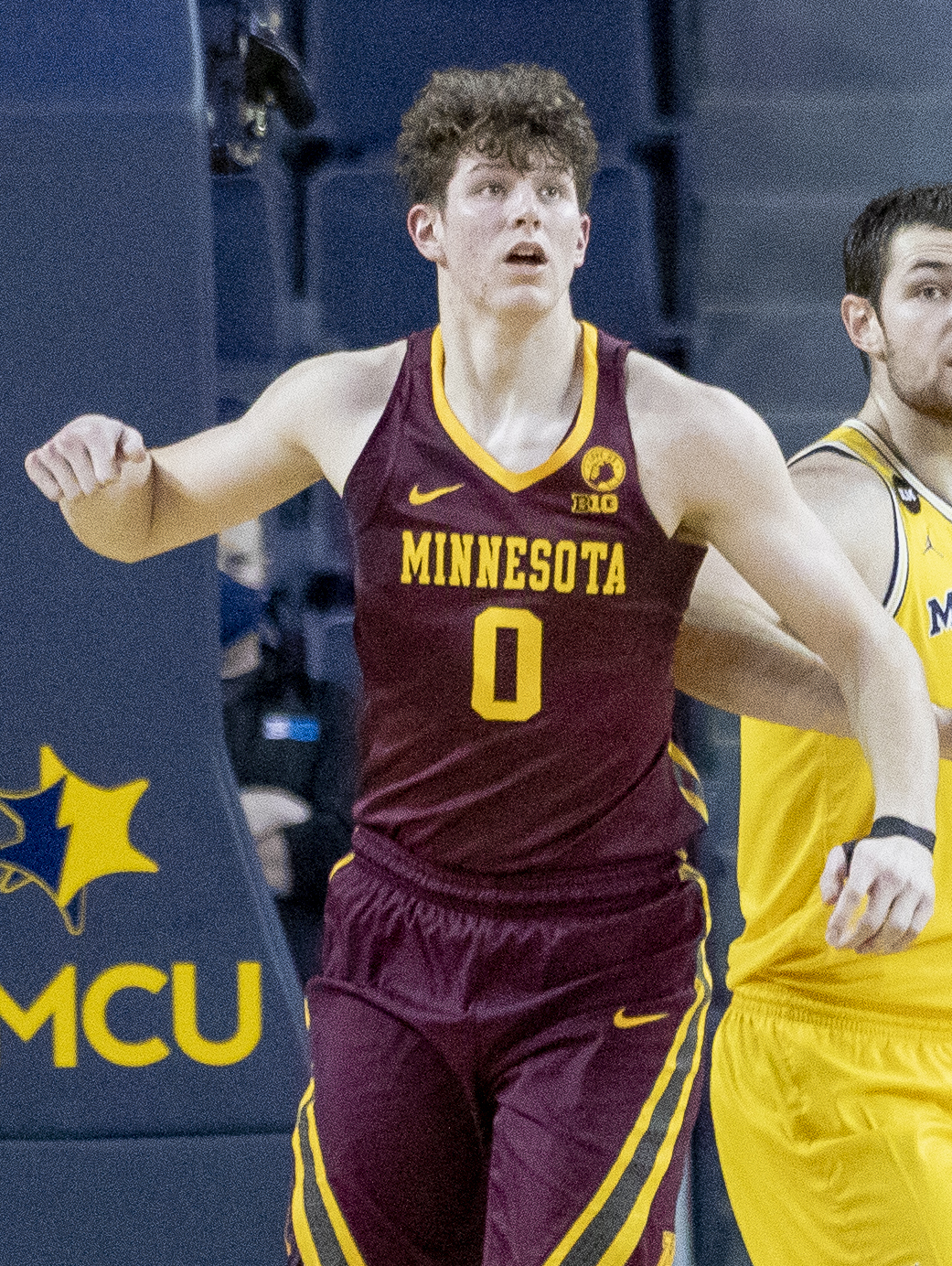
- Robbins with Minnesota in 2021

No. 21 – Westchester Knicks
- Position: Center
- League: NBA G League

Personal information
- Born: July 12, 1999 (age 27) Waukesha, Wisconsin, U.S.
- Listed height: 7 ft 0 in (2.13 m)
- Listed weight: 250 lb (113 kg)

Career information
- High school: Assumption (Davenport, Iowa); Sunrise Christian Academy (Bel Aire, Kansas)
- College: Drake (2018–2020); Minnesota (2020–2021); Vanderbilt (2021–2023)
- NBA draft: 2023: undrafted
- Playing career: 2024–present

Career history
- 2024–2025: Milwaukee Bucks
- 2024–2025: →Wisconsin Herd
- 2025–2026: Rip City Remix
- 2026–present: Westchester Knicks

Career highlights
- NBA Cup champion (2024); SEC Defensive Player of the Year (2023); First-team All-SEC (2023); Second-team All-MVC (2020); MVC All-Defensive Team (2020)
- Stats at NBA.com
- Stats at Basketball Reference

Liam Robbins (born July 12, 1999) is an American professional basketball player for the Westchester Knicks of the NBA G League. He played college basketball for the Drake Bulldogs, Minnesota Golden Gophers, and Vanderbilt Commodores.

== High school career ==
Robbins played sparingly in his first three years at Assumption High School in Davenport, Iowa. He entered the starting lineup as a senior, averaging 9.2 points per game. Robbins had no NCAA Division I scholarship offers out of high school and reclassified to attend Sunrise Christian Academy in Bel Aire, Kansas. He weighed about 300 pounds (140 kg) when he arrived at Sunrise but reached a weight of 235 pounds (107 kg) after four months by fasting and working out. On April 17, 2018, he committed to play college basketball for Drake.

== College career ==
=== Drake ===
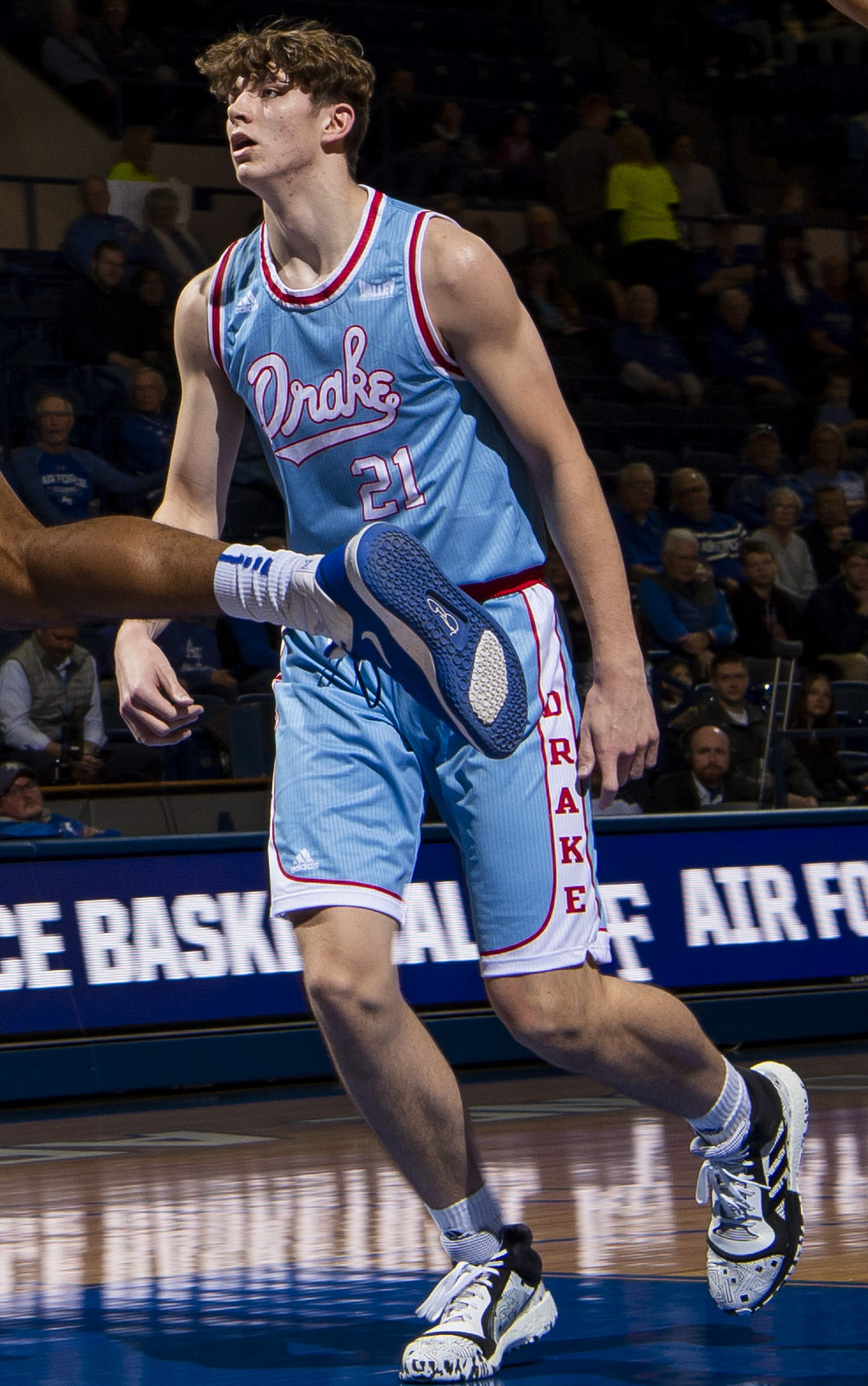
Robbins with Drake in 2019

As a freshman at Drake, Robbins served as a backup to Nick McGlynn, whom he took advice from. He averaged 4.1 points, 2.7 rebounds and 1.1 blocks per game. On January 7, 2020, Robbins recorded 20 points, nine rebounds and a career-high seven blocks in a 65–62 win over Loyola Chicago, despite having the stomach flu. He tied the program single-game record for blocks. On February 5, Robbins posted a career-high 29 points, seven rebounds and three blocks in a 73–60 victory over Bradley. As a sophomore, he averaged 14.1 points, 7.1 rebounds and 2.9 blocks per game, which ranked fifth in the nation, while recording a school-record 99 blocks. He was named to the Second Team All-Missouri Valley Conference and earned All-Defensive Team, Most Improved Team and All-Tournament Team honors.

=== Minnesota ===
For his junior season, Robbins transferred to Minnesota where his uncle Ed Conroy was an assistant coach. He was granted immediate eligibility by the National Collegiate Athletic Association. Robbins helped replace Daniel Oturu, who left for a professional career. On January 3, 2021, he recorded 27 points, 14 rebounds and five blocks in a 77–60 win over Ohio State. Robbins was subsequently named Big Ten Player of the Week and Oscar Robertson National Player of the Week. He missed the final six games of the season with a sprained ankle. As a junior, he averaged 11.7 points, 6.6 rebounds and a Big Ten-leading 2.7 blocks per game.

=== Vanderbilt ===
Robbins transferred to Vanderbilt for his senior season alongside his uncle Ed Conroy, who became an assistant coach for the Commodores. He missed the first several months of the season and averaged 6.8 points, 4.0 rebounds and 2.0 blocks per game. He came back for his fifth season of eligibility and averaged 15 points, 6.8 rebounds, and 3.2 blocks per game. On March 2, 2023, Robbins suffered a leg injury early in a game against Kentucky, forcing him to miss the rest of the season. Despite this injury, Robbins was named the 2022–23 SEC Defensive Player of the Year.

== Professional career ==
=== Milwaukee Bucks / Wisconsin Herd (2024–2025) ===
After going undrafted in the 2023 NBA draft, Robbins signed with the New Orleans Pelicans on September 30, 2023, but was waived on October 12. On October 29, he signed with the Birmingham Squadron, but before playing for them, he suffered a season-ending injury on January 12, 2024.

On August 27, 2024, Robbins signed with the Milwaukee Bucks and on October 21, the Bucks converted his deal into a two-way contract. Robbins was honored as a part of the Bucks team that won the 2024 NBA Cup game, fulfilling a promise made by Giannis Antetokounmpo to help him buy a house in his hometown of Davenport, Iowa.

On February 27, 2025, Robbins was waived by the Bucks in order to sign Pete Nance.

=== Rip City Remix (2025–2026) ===
For the 2025–26 season, Robbins was added to the roster of the Portland Trail Blazers' NBA G League affiliate, the Rip City Remix.

=== Westchester Knicks (2026–present) ===
On September 15, 2026, Robbins signed an Exhibit 10 contract with the New York Knicks. However, he was waived by New York the following day.

== Career statistics ==
Legend
GP	Games played	GS	Games started	MPG	Minutes per game
FG%	Field goal percentage	3P%	3-point field goal percentage	FT%	Free throw percentage
RPG	Rebounds per game	APG	Assists per game	SPG	Steals per game
BPG	Blocks per game	PPG	Points per game	**Bold**	Career high

=== NBA ===
==== Regular season ====
Year	Team	GP	GS	MPG	FG%	3P%	FT%	RPG	APG	SPG	BPG	PPG
2024–25	Milwaukee	13	0	4.4	.250	.000	.500	.9	.2	.2	.2	.7
Career		13	0	4.4	.250	.000	.500	.9	.2	.2	.2	.7

=== College ===
Year	Team	GP	GS	MPG	FG%	3P%	FT%	RPG	APG	SPG	BPG	PPG
2018–19	Drake	31	2	11.3	.442	.231	.595	2.7	.5	.3	1.1	4.1
2019–20	Drake	**34**	**34**	**27.1**	.499	.244	**.694**	**7.1**	.8	.6	2.9	14.1
2020–21	Minnesota	23	22	24.7	.441	.327	.694	6.6	**1.1**	**.7**	2.7	11.7
2021–22	Vanderbilt	15	10	18.3	.435	.286	.606	4.0	.67	.4	1.87	6.8
2022–23	Vanderbilt	26	15	22.9	**.504**	**.365**	**.731**	6.85	1.0	.31	**3.15**	**15.0**
Career		129	83	20.9	.477	.306	.693	5.53	.81	.46	2.37	10.63

== Personal life ==
Robbins' uncle, Ed Conroy, is head basketball coach at The Citadel in South Carolina. He was previously an assistant basketball coach for Vanderbilt and an assistant coach at Minnesota when he recruited Robbins to transfer from Drake to Minnesota. When Conroy left for Vanderbilt, Robbins followed his uncle there. His cousin and Conroy's son, Hunt, played basketball for Minnesota as a point guard.
