= 2008–09 Wichita State Shockers men's basketball team =

American college basketball season

2008–09 Wichita State Shockers men's basketball

CBI 2nd Round
- Conference: Missouri Valley Conference
- Record: 17–17 (8–10 MVC)
- Head coach: Gregg Marshall (2nd season)
- Assistant coaches: Earl Grant; Marty Gross; Chris Jans
- Home arena: Charles Koch Arena capacity:10,502

2008–09 Missouri Valley Conference men's basketball standings
	Conf.				Overall
Team	W		L	PCT	W		L	PCT
Northern Iowa †	14	–	4	.778	23	–	11	.676
Creighton	14	–	4	.778	27	–	8	.771
Illinois State	11	–	7	.611	24	–	10	.706
Bradley	10	–	8	.556	21	–	15	.583
Southern Illinois	8	–	10	.444	13	–	18	.419
Evansville	8	–	10	.444	17	–	14	.548
Wichita State	8	–	10	.444	17	–	17	.500
Drake	7	–	11	.389	17	–	16	.515
Indiana State	7	–	11	.389	11	–	21	.344
Missouri State	3	–	15	.167	11	–	20	.355
† Missouri Valley Conference tournament winner As of April 1, 2009; Rankings from AP Poll

The 2008–09 Wichita State Shockers men's basketball team represented Wichita State University in the 2008-09 NCAA Division I men's basketball season. The team, which played in the Missouri Valley Conference (MVC), was led by second-year head coach Gregg Marshall. The Shockers opened the season with a win over Florida A&M on November 10, 2008, and ended the season with a loss to Stanford in the College Basketball Invitational. Their final record for 2008–09 was 17–17 (8–10 MVC), an improvement from their 2007–08 record of 11–20 (4–14 MVC).

== Regular season ==
The Shockers started out with mediocre level of play, but performed well against then ranked Michigan St. and Georgetown and even beat a very good Siena team in the Old Spice Classic at the end of November. On February 21, the Shockers beat a Cleveland State team with an RPI of almost a hundred better than WSU's. Then came conference play. The Shockers lost their first 6 games in Missouri Valley play, and on January 14, were in dead last in the MVC. Then came the comeback. In the more-than-century-old MVC, 49 teams had started 0–6. None won more than five games in conference play for the rest of the season.

== Post-season ==
Wichita State finished MVC play 8–10 but were not rewarded well with a 7 seed in the MVC tournament. They beat Missouri St. 59–46 in the play-in game at the Scottrade Center in St. Louis, and now had to face a hot no. 2 Creighton team. It was a game no one expected them to win. The Shockers tried to keep close in the first half, but were down by 13 at halftime. Creighton came out and made a huge run in the second half, giving them a 22-point lead and a chance to embarrass Wichita State. But the Shockers did not give up, and shut Creighton down almost the rest of the way. They came within 13 with 3:43 to play in the game and 5 with about 1 minute. The Shockers were down 61–59 with about 10 seconds left, but had the ball. Toure' Murry, who had already had two game-saving shots this season, caught the inbounds pass and quickly shot a 3-pointer, which swished through the net. The Shockers had come back from 22 down to take the lead. With 9 seconds left, Creighton inbounded the ball and brought it all the way down, but shot a wild jumper that missed. A Shocker tried to grab the rebound but lost it out of bounds. Creighton had 1.8 seconds to take the lead. Booker Woodfox half-fumbled the inbounds pass, but threw up a 17-footer which swished right through. The Bluejays had escaped.

The Shockers were given a chance to bounce back from the heartbreak with a spot in the College Basketball Invitational, one of the NCAA's minor post-season tournaments made for improving teams. In the first round of the single-elimination tournament, Wichita State beat Buffalo by a score of 84–73. The Shockers season was then ended on March 23 with a 70–56 loss to Stanford in the second round of the CBI.

== Schedule ==
Missouri Valley Conference Standing: T-9th
**Date**	**Opponent***	**Rank***	**Location**	**Time**^{#}	**Result**	**Overall**	**Conference**
**Exhibition Games**
November 10, 2008	Emporia State		Wichita, KS	?:?? p.m.	**W 71–58**	1–0	0–0
**Regular Season Games**
November 16, 2008	Florida A&M		Wichita, KS	?:?? p.m.	**W 77–53**	1–0	0–0
February 21, 2009	ESPNU Bracketbusters		TBD	TBD		0–0	0–0
**Missouri Valley Conference tournament**
March 5–8, 2009	TBD		St. Louis, MO	TBA	TBD	0–0	0–0
*Rank according to ESPN/USA Today Coaches Poll. ^{#}All times are in CST. Conference games in **BOLD**.
