= 1994–95 Tulsa Golden Hurricane men's basketball team =

American college basketball season

1994–95 Tulsa Golden Hurricane men's basketball

MVC regular season champion

NCAA tournament, Sweet Sixteen
- Conference: Missouri Valley Conference

Ranking
- Coaches: No. 15
- Record: 24–8 (15–3 MVC)
- Head coach: Tubby Smith (4th season)
- Assistant coach: Jim Platt (1st season)
- Home arena: Tulsa Convention Center

1994–95 Missouri Valley Conference men's basketball standings
	Conf.				Overall
Team	W		L	PCT	W		L	PCT
Tulsa	15	–	3	.833	24	–	8	.750
Illinois State	13	–	5	.722	20	–	13	.606
Southern Illinois †	13	–	5	.722	23	–	9	.719
Bradley	12	–	6	.667	20	–	10	.667
Evansville	11	–	7	.611	18	–	9	.667
Drake	9	–	9	.500	12	–	15	.444
Southwest Missouri State	9	–	9	.500	16	–	11	.593
Wichita State	6	–	12	.333	13	–	14	.481
Northern Iowa	4	–	14	.222	8	–	20	.286
Creighton	4	–	14	.222	7	–	19	.269
Indiana State	3	–	15	.167	7	–	19	.269
† 1995 MVC tournament winner Rankings from AP Poll

The 1994–95 Tulsa Golden Hurricane men's basketball team represented the University of Tulsa as a member of the Missouri Valley Conference during the 1994–95 college basketball season. The Golden Hurricane played their home games at the Tulsa Convention Center. Led by head coach Tubby Smith, they finished the season 24–8 overall and 15–3 in conference play to finish atop the MVC standings. After losing in the championship game of the MVC tournament, the team defeated Illinois and Old Dominion to reach the Sweet Sixteen of the NCAA tournament, before falling to No. 2 seed UMass in the Midwest Regional semifinals.

== Roster ==
1994–95 Tulsa Golden Hurricane men's basketball team
Players	Coaches
Pos. / # / Name / Height / Weight / Year / Hometown; G / 21 / Shea Seals / 6 ft 5 in (1.96 m) / 200 lb (91 kg) / So / Tulsa, Oklahoma	Head coach Tubby Smith Assistant coach(es): Jim Platt (Concordia (IL)); Legend: (C) Team captain; (S) Suspended; (I) Ineligible; (W) Walk-on; Injured; Current redshirt

== Schedule and results ==
Date time, TV	Rank^{#}	Opponent^{#}	Result	Record	Site (attendance) city, state
Regular season
Dec 3, 1994*		Texas–San Antonio	W 77–57	1–0	Tulsa Convention Center (6,189); Tulsa, Oklahoma
Dec 7, 1994*		at Oklahoma State	L 88–93	1–1	Gallagher-Iba Arena (6,381); Stillwater, Oklahoma
Dec 10, 1994*		Oral Roberts	W 99–54	2–1	Tulsa Convention Center (6,365); Tulsa, Oklahoma
Dec 17, 1994		at Drake	W 93–76	3–1 (1–0)	Knapp Center (4,317); Des Moines, Iowa
Dec 23, 1994*		at No. 3 Arkansas	L 63–82	3–2	Bud Walton Arena (20,242); Fayetteville, Arkansas
Dec 31, 1994		Creighton	W 80–65	4–2 (2–0)	Tulsa Convention Center (6,972); Tulsa, Oklahoma
Jan 3, 1995		Northern Iowa	W 85–53	5–2 (3–0)	Tulsa Convention Center (6,035); Tulsa, Oklahoma
Jan 6, 1995*		vs. TCU; All-College Tournament	W 107–95	6–2	Myriad Convention Center (8,148); Oklahoma City, Oklahoma
Jan 7, 1995*		vs. Oklahoma; All-College Basketball Tournament	L 61–76	6–3	Myriad Convention Center (12,893); Oklahoma City, Oklahoma
Jan 12, 1995		at Wichita State	W 79–52	7–3 (4–0)	Levitt Arena (7,790); Wichita, Kansas
Jan 14, 1995		Evansville	W 72–66 ^{OT}	8–3 (5–0)	Tulsa Convention Center (7,235); Tulsa, Oklahoma
Jan 16, 1995		Southern Illinois	W 67–65	9–3 (6–0)	Tulsa Convention Center (6,392); Tulsa, Oklahoma
MVC Tournament
Mar 4, 1995*	(1)	vs. (8) Wichita State; Quarterfinals	W 77–63	21–6	Kiel Center (9,673); St. Louis, Missouri
Mar 5, 1995*	(1)	vs. (4) Bradley; Semifinals	W 89–80	22–6	Kiel Center (13,271); St. Louis, Missouri
Mar 6, 1995*	(1)	vs. (3) Southern Illinois; Championship game	L 62–77	22–7	Kiel Center (10,795); St. Louis, Missouri
NCAA Tournament
Mar 17, 1995*	(6 E)	vs. (11 E) Illinois; First Round	W 68–62	23–7	Times Union Center (15,100); Uniondale, New York
Mar 19, 1995*	(6 E)	vs. (14 E) Old Dominion; Second Round	W 64–52	24–7	Times Union Center (15,109); Uniondale, New York
Mar 24, 1995*	(6 E)	vs. (2 E) No. 7 UMass; East Regional semifinal – Sweet Sixteen	L 51–76	24–8	Brendan Byrne Arena (19,689); East Rutherford, New Jersey
*Non-conference game. ^{#}Rankings from AP. (#) Tournament seedings in parentheses. E=East. All times are in Central.
