= 2008–09 Illinois State Redbirds men's basketball team =

American college basketball season

2008–09 Illinois State Redbirds men's basketball

SMU Tip–Off Classic champion World Vision Invitational champion

NIT tournament, First Round
- Conference: Missouri Valley Conference
- Record: 24–10 (11–7 MVC)
- Head coach: Tim Jankovich (2nd season)
- Assistant coaches: Rob Judson; Anthony Beane; Paris Parham
- Home arena: Doug Collins Court at Redbird Arena

2008–09 Missouri Valley Conference men's basketball standings
	Conf.				Overall
Team	W		L	PCT	W		L	PCT
Northern Iowa †	14	–	4	.778	23	–	11	.676
Creighton	14	–	4	.778	27	–	8	.771
Illinois State	11	–	7	.611	24	–	10	.706
Bradley	10	–	8	.556	21	–	15	.583
Southern Illinois	8	–	10	.444	13	–	18	.419
Evansville	8	–	10	.444	17	–	14	.548
Wichita State	8	–	10	.444	17	–	17	.500
Drake	7	–	11	.389	17	–	16	.515
Indiana State	7	–	11	.389	11	–	21	.344
Missouri State	3	–	15	.167	11	–	20	.355
† Missouri Valley Conference tournament winner As of April 1, 2009; Rankings from AP Poll

The 2008–09 Illinois State Redbirds men's basketball team represented Illinois State University during the 2008–09 NCAA Division I men's basketball season. The Redbirds, led by second year head coach Tim Jankovich, played their home games at Doug Collins Court at Redbird Arena and were a member of the Missouri Valley Conference.

The Redbirds finished the season 24–10, 11–7 in conference play to finish in third place. They were the number three seed for the Missouri Valley Conference tournament. They won their quarterfinal game versus the University of Evansville and semifinal game versus Creighton University but lost their final game versus the University of Northern Iowa.

The Redbirds received an at-large bid to the 2009 National Invitation Tournament and were assigned the number five seed in the San Diego State University regional. They were defeated by Kansas State University in the first round.

== Roster ==
2008–09 Illinois State Redbirds men's basketball team
Players
Coaches

Pos.	#	Name	Height	Weight	Year	Hometown
G	1	Emmanuel Holloway	6 ft 2 in (1.88 m)	190 lb (86 kg)	Sr	Cartersville, GA
G	45	Brandon Holtz	6 ft 4 in (1.93 m)	185 lb (84 kg)	Sr	Bloomington, IL
G	15	Sead Odzic	6 ft 3 in (1.91 m)	192 lb (87 kg)	Sr	Skokie, IL
G	25	Chamberlain Oguchi	6 ft 6 in (1.98 m)	198 lb (90 kg)	Sr	Houston, TX
C	41	Brandon Sampay	6 ft 8 in (2.03 m)	255 lb (116 kg)	Sr	Inglewood, CA
F	42	Dinma Odiakosa	6 ft 8 in (2.03 m)	240 lb (109 kg)	RS Jr	Akwukwu, Nigeria
G	0	Osiris Eldridge	6 ft 3 in (1.91 m)	190 lb (86 kg)	Jr	Chicago, IL
F	24	Bobby Hill (redshirt)	6 ft 6 in (1.98 m)	220 lb (100 kg)	Jr	St. Louis, MO
F	50	Blake Mishler (redshirt)	6 ft 8 in (2.03 m)	245 lb (111 kg)	Jr	Metamora, IL
G	12	Lloyd Phillips	5 ft 10 in (1.78 m)	170 lb (77 kg)	Jr	Washington, DC
G	23	Landon Shipley	6 ft 0 in (1.83 m)	183 lb (83 kg)	Jr	St. Louis, MO
G	3	Alex Rubin	6 ft 1 in (1.85 m)	185 lb (84 kg)	So	Plymouth, MN
F	32	Ty Modupe (redshirt)	6 ft 7 in (2.01 m)	205 lb (93 kg)	Fr	Topeka, KS
F	31	Jeremy Robinson	6 ft 8 in (2.03 m)	210 lb (95 kg)	Fr	Decatur, IL
G	10	Kenyon Smith (redshirt)	5 ft 11 in (1.8 m)	183 lb (83 kg)	Fr	Chicago, IL
F	21	Kellen Thornton	6 ft 8 in (2.03 m)	243 lb (110 kg)	Fr	Country Club Hills, IL

Head coach

- Tim Jankovich (Kansas State)

Assistant coach(es)

- Rob Judson (Illinois)
- Anthony Beane (Kansas State)
- Paris Parham (Minnesota State)

Legend

- (C) Team captain
- (S) Suspended
- (I) Ineligible
- (W) Walk-on
- Injured
- Current redshirt

== Schedule ==
Date time, TV	Rank^{#}	Opponent^{#}	Result	Record	High points	High rebounds	High assists	Site (attendance) city, state
Exhibition Season
November 11, 2008; 7:05 pm		Illinois–Springfield	W 81–61		19 – Eldridge	10 – Odiakosa	–	Redbird Arena; Normal, IL
Regular Season
November 15, 2008*; 6:00 pm		at Wright State	W 69–61	1–0	15 – Eldridge	13 – Oguchi	3 – Odzic	Nutter Center (6,371); Dayton, OH
November 21, 2008*; 5:00 pm		vs. Alabama State; SMU Tip–Off Classic	W 77–71	2–0	16 – Oguchi, Eldridge	7 – Oguchi, Eldridge	6 – Phillips	Moody Coliseum (2,359); University Park, TX
November 22, 2008*; 5:00 pm		vs. Houston Baptist; SMU Tip–Off Classic	W 107–70	3–0	16 – Eldridge	5 – Thornton	6 – Holloway	Moody Coliseum (2,372); University Park, TX
November 23, 2008*; 7:30 pm		at SMU; SMU Tip–Off Classic	W 84–73	4–0	28 – Oguchi	6 – Odiakosa	6 – Eldridge	Moody Coliseum (2,321); University Park, TX
November 28, 2008*; 6:05 pm		Nicholls State; World Vision Invitational	W 75–65	5–0	24 – Eldridge	10 – Oguchi	5 – Oguchi	Redbird Arena (4,125); Normal, IL
November 29, 2008*; 6:05 pm		Winston-Salem State; World Vision Invitational	W 53–33	6–0	17 – Oguchi	9 – Eldridge	4 – Phillips	Redbird Arena (4,094); Normal, IL
November 30, 2008*; 3:35 pm		UC Santa Barbara; World Vision Invitational	W 87–59	7–0	18 – Oguchi, Eldridge	8 – Eldridge	7 – Holloway	Redbird Arena (4,207); Normal, IL
December 6, 2008*; 7:05 pm		Bowling Green	W 78–65	8–0	19 – Eldridge	8 – Eldridge, Odiakosa	5 – Phillips	Redbird Arena (5,912); Normal, IL
December 14, 2008*; 2:05 pm		Morehead State	W 76–70	9–0	25 – Oguchi	8 – Odiakosa	4 – Eldridge, Phillips	Redbird Arena (5,029); Normal, IL
December 17, 2008*; 6:00 pm		at Central Michigan	W 72–69	10–0	18 – Eldridge	9 – Odiakosa	3 – Holloway	Daniel P. Rose Center (489); Mount Pleasant, MI
December 20, 2008*; 7:05 pm		UIC	W 67–60	11–0	18 – Oguchi	13 – Odiakosa	4 – Eldridge	Redbird Arena (6,121); Normal, IL
December 28, 2008; 2:05 pm		at Missouri State	W 72–69 ^{OT}	12–0 (1–0)	16 – Phillips	6 – Holloway	3 – Oguchi, Phillips	JQH Arena (7,087); Springfield, MO
December 31, 2008; 2:05 pm		Evansville	W 80–50	13–0 (2–0)	22 – Eldridge	13 – Odiakosa	7 – Phillips	Redbird Arena (7,336); Normal, IL
January 3, 2009; 7:05 pm, CSN/FSN		Creighton	W 86–64	14–0 (3–0)	20 – Eldridge	9 – Eldridge	7 – Phillips	Redbird Arena (10,200); Normal, IL
January 6, 2009; 7:05 pm, CSN		at Bradley	L 52–56	14–1 (3–1)	17 – Eldridge	10 – Eldridge	4 – Phillips	Carver Arena (11,592); Peoria, IL
January 10, 2009; 6:05 pm		at Indiana State	L 70-75 ^{OT}	14–2 (3–2)	22 – Oguchi	9 – Odiakosa	5 – Holloway, Eldridge	Hulman Center (10,200); Terre Haute, IN
January 14, 2009; 7:05 pm		Drake	W 65–61	15–2 (4–2)	29 – Oguchi	10 – Odiakosa	3 – Holloway, Phillips	Redbird Arena (7,634); Normal, IL
January 18, 2009; 2:05 pm		Missouri State	W 68–56	16–2 (5–2)	15 – Holloway, Phillips	13 – Odiakosa	5 – Holloway, Phillips	Redbird Arena (9,055); Normal, IL
January 21, 2009; 7:05 pm		at Wichita State	L 58–64	16–3 (5–3)	16 – Eldridge	6 – Eldridge	3 – Holloway, Phillips	Charles Koch Arena (10,353); Wichita, KS
January 24, 2009; 4:05 pm, CSN/FSN		Southern Illinois	W 70–63	17–3 (6–3)	17 – Oguchi	9 – Sampay	4 – Phillips	Redbird Arena (10,200); Normal, IL
January 28, 2009; 7:05 pm		at Northern Iowa	L 55–59	17–4 (6–4)	11 – Oguchi	9 – Holloway	7 – Phillips	McLeod Center (4,536); Cedar Falls, IA
January 31, 2009; 3:05 pm, CSN		Bradley	W 69–65	18–4 (7–4)	15 – Holloway	11 – Oguchi	7 – Phillips	Redbird Arena (10,200); Normal, IL
February 4, 2009; 7:05 pm, FSN		at Southern Illinois	W 60–57 ^{OT}	19–4 (8–4)	15 – Oguchi	8 – Odiakosa	3 – Eldridge	SIU Arena (5,087); Carbondale, IL
February 8, 2009; 6:05 pm, ESPNU		Indiana State	L 73–75 ^{OT}	19–5 (8–5)	19 – Oguchi	11 – Oguchi	3 – Holloway, Sampay, Eldridge	Redbird Arena (7,849); Normal, IL
February 11, 2009; 7:05 pm		at Evansville	W 70–68	20–5 (9–5)	18 – Eldridge	8 – Sampay	6 – Holloway	Roberts Municipal Stadium (5,151); Evansville, IN
February 15, 2009; 6:05 pm, ESPNU		at Drake	W 67–45	21–5 (10–5)	14 – Eldridge	10 – Eldridge	6 – Holloway	The Knapp Center (4,502); Des Moines, IA
February 18, 2009; 7:05 pm		Wichita State	W 74–59	22–5 (11–5)	16 – Oguchi	8 – Odiakosa	3 – Eldridge, Shipley	Redbird Arena (6,576); Normal, IL
February 20, 2009*; 6:00 pm, ESPN2		at Niagara; ESPNU BracketBusters	L 56–70	22–6	19 – Oguchi	11 – Sampay	4 – Holloway	Gallagher Center (2,400); Lewiston, NY
February 24, 2009; 7:05 pm		Northern Iowa	L 67–69 ^{2OT}	22–7 (11–6)	19 – Sampay	12 – Sampay	5 – Phillips	Redbird Arena (8,232); Normal, IL
February 28, 2009; 1:05 pm, ESPN2		at Creighton	L 70–74	22–8 (11–7)	14 – Holloway, Oguchi	9 – Eldridge	4 – Eldridge	Qwest Center Omaha (17,116); Omaha, NE
Missouri Valley Conference tournament
March 6, 2009; 8:35 pm, CSN/FSN	(3)	vs. (6) Evansville; Quarterfinal	W 78–68	23–8	20 – Oguchi	8 – Odiakosa	4 – Phillips	Scottrade Center (12,765); St. Louis, MO
March 7, 2009; 4:05 pm, CSN/FSN	(3)	vs. (2) Creighton; Semifinal	W 73–49	24–8	21 – Eldrige	9 – Odiakosa	4 – Phillips	Scottrade Center (15,333); St. Louis, MO
March 8, 2009; 1:05 pm, CBS	(3)	vs. (1) Northern Iowa; Final	L 57–60 ^{OT}	24–9	21 – Eldridge	10 – Odiakosa	3 – Eldridge	Scottrade Center (9,136); St. Louis, MO
National Invitation Tournament
March 18, 2009; 7:00 pm	(5)	at (4) Kansas State; San Diego State Regional [First Round]	L 79–83 ^{OT}	24–10	23 – Oguchi	12 – Odiakosa	9 – Phillips	Bramlage Coliseum (8,130); Manhattan, KS
*Non-conference game. ^{#}Rankings from AP Poll. (#) Tournament seedings in parentheses. All times are in Central Standard Time.
