= 2009 Missouri Valley Conference men's basketball tournament =

- Classification: Division I
- Season: 2008–09
- Teams: 10
- Site: Scottrade Center; St. Louis, Missouri
- Champions: Northern Iowa (2nd title)
- Winning coach: Ben Jacobson (1st title)
- MVP: Osiris Eldridge (Illinois State)
- Television: FSN Midwest, CBS

2008–09 Missouri Valley Conference men's basketball standings
	Conf.				Overall
Team	W		L	PCT	W		L	PCT
Northern Iowa †	14	–	4	.778	23	–	11	.676
Creighton	14	–	4	.778	27	–	8	.771
Illinois State	11	–	7	.611	24	–	10	.706
Bradley	10	–	8	.556	21	–	15	.583
Southern Illinois	8	–	10	.444	13	–	18	.419
Evansville	8	–	10	.444	17	–	14	.548
Wichita State	8	–	10	.444	17	–	17	.500
Drake	7	–	11	.389	17	–	16	.515
Indiana State	7	–	11	.389	11	–	21	.344
Missouri State	3	–	15	.167	11	–	20	.355
† Missouri Valley Conference tournament winner As of April 1, 2009; Rankings from AP Poll

Popularly referred to as "Arch Madness", the 2009 Missouri Valley Conference men's basketball tournament as part of the 2008–09 NCAA Division I men's basketball season was played in St. Louis, Missouri March 5–8, 2009. The tournament was won by the Northern Iowa Panthers, who received the Missouri Valley Conference's automatic bid to the 2009 NCAA Men's Division I Basketball Tournament.

== Tournament Bracket ==
Opening Round; Thursday, March 5
8	Drake	55
9	Indiana State	62
7	Wichita State	59
10	Missouri State	46

Quarterfinals; Friday, March 6
1	Northern Iowa	73
9	Indiana State	69
4	Bradley	67
5	Southern Illinois	55
2	Creighton	63
7	Wichita State	62
3	Illinois State	78
6	Evansville	68

Semifinals; Saturday, March 7
1	Northern Iowa	76
4	Bradley	62
2	Creighton	49
3	Illinois State	73

Final; Sunday, March 8
1	Northern Iowa	60
3	Illinois State	57
