= Arcadia Valley School District =

School district in Missouri, U.S.

Address
- 750 Park Drive Ironton, Missouri, 63650; United States

District information
- Grades: K-12
- Superintendent: Dr. Carver
- NCES District ID: 2903150

Students and staff
- Enrollment: 953 (2020-2021)
- Staff: 74.00 (on an FTE basis)
- Student–teacher ratio: 12.88

Other information
- Website: www.avr2.org

Arcadia Valley School District is a public school district serving portions of Iron County, Missouri.

== Schools ==
- Arcadia Valley Elementary School
- Arcadia Valley Middle School
- Arcadia Valley High School
- Arcadia Valley Career Technology Center

== Athletics ==
- Arcadia Valley Tigers Boys' Basketball

The 2009-2010 Boys' Basketball team had a record of 28–1.

- Arcadia Valley Tigers Girls' Cross Country

The 2012-2013 Girls' Cross Country team finished second at state (highest finish in AV history)
