= Al Williams (basketball) =

American basketball player (1948–2007)

Personal information
- Born: February 14, 1948 Peoria, Illinois, U.S.
- Died: July 2, 2007 (aged 59) Georgia, U.S.
- Listed height: 6 ft 6 in (1.98 m)
- Listed weight: 200 lb (91 kg)

Career information
- High school: Manual (Peoria, Illinois)
- College: Drake (1967–1970)
- NBA draft: 1970: 3rd round, 51st overall pick
- Drafted by: New York Knicks
- Playing career: 1970–1976
- Position: Forward
- Number: 42

Career history
- 1970–1971: Kentucky Colonels
- 1971: Wilkes-Barre Barons
- 1971–1972: Trenton Pat Pavers
- 1972–1974: Hamilton Pat Pavers
- 1974–1975: Cherry Hill Pros
- 1975–1976: Scranton Apollos

Career highlights
- All-EBA First Team (1975); First-team All-MVC (1970)
- Stats at Basketball Reference

Alfred B. Williams (February 14, 1948 – July 2, 2007) was an American professional basketball player.

A 6'6" forward from Peoria, Illinois, Williams played at Drake University from 1967 to 1970. He was a member of Drake's 1969 NCAA Final Four team, who lost to UCLA in the national semifinals. Williams graduated as his school's all-time best rebounder with a career average of 8.6 rebounds per game.

From 1970 to 1971, Williams played professional basketball with the Kentucky Colonels of the American Basketball Association. He averaged 3.9 points and 2.4 rebounds in 11 games.

Williams played in the Eastern Basketball Association (EBA) for the Wilkes-Barre Barons, Trenton Pat Pavers, Hamilton Pat Pavers, Cherry Hill Pros and Scranton Apollos from 1970 to 1976. He was selected to the All-EBA First Team in 1975.

Williams died of liver cancer at a hospital in Georgia.
