= 1994–95 Drake Bulldogs men's basketball team =

American college basketball season

1994–95 Drake Bulldogs men's basketball
- Conference: Missouri Valley Conference
- Record: 12–15 (9–9 MVC)
- Head coach: Rudy Washington (5th season)
- Home arena: Knapp Center

1994–95 Missouri Valley Conference men's basketball standings
	Conf.				Overall
Team	W		L	PCT	W		L	PCT
Tulsa	15	–	3	.833	24	–	8	.750
Illinois State	13	–	5	.722	20	–	13	.606
Southern Illinois †	13	–	5	.722	23	–	9	.719
Bradley	12	–	6	.667	20	–	10	.667
Evansville	11	–	7	.611	18	–	9	.667
Drake	9	–	9	.500	12	–	15	.444
Southwest Missouri State	9	–	9	.500	16	–	11	.593
Wichita State	6	–	12	.333	13	–	14	.481
Northern Iowa	4	–	14	.222	8	–	20	.286
Creighton	4	–	14	.222	7	–	19	.269
Indiana State	3	–	15	.167	7	–	19	.269
† 1995 MVC tournament winner Rankings from AP Poll

The 1994–95 Drake Bulldogs men's basketball team represented Drake University during the 1994–95 NCAA Division I men's basketball season. The Bulldogs, led by 5th-year head coach Rudy Washington, played their home games at the Knapp Center in Des Moines, Iowa, as members of the Missouri Valley Conference (MVC).

The Bulldogs struggled to find rhythm throughout the season. After losing 4 of 5 to open their schedule, the team essentially alternated wins and losses for the remainder of the season. Incredibly, the entire conference slate produced just one two-game streak (win). Drake finished the season with a record of 12–15 (9–9 MVC).

== Roster ==
1994–95 Drake Bulldogs men's basketball team
Players
Coaches

Pos.	#	Name	Height	Weight	Year	Previous school	Hometown
G	3	Donta Randle	5 ft 8 in (1.73 m)	—	Fr		Houston, TX
F	4	Kevin Bennett	6 ft 4 in (1.93 m)	—	So		Houston, TX
G	5	Rudy Washington	6 ft 3 in (1.91 m)	—	Sr		Los Angeles, CA
G	10	B. J. Windhorst	6 ft 4 in (1.93 m)	190 lb (86 kg)	Jr	IWCC; Clarinda	Clarinda, IA
G	15	Aleksander Surla	6 ft 2 in (1.88 m)	—	Sr		Novi Sad, Yugoslavia
G	20	Dan Knuckey	6 ft 2 in (1.88 m)	188 lb (85 kg)	Jr		Rock Island, IL
G	22	Lynnrick Rogers	6 ft 2 in (1.88 m)	179 lb (81 kg)	So		Dawson, GA
G	24	Shawn Caracoza	6 ft 1 in (1.85 m)	180 lb (82 kg)	So		Lakewood, CA
C	25	Ken Maxey	6 ft 8 in (2.03 m)	255 lb (116 kg)	Jr		Bellflower, CA
G	31	Gregg Gottlieb	5 ft 11 in (1.8 m)	—	Sr	El Modena	Orange, CA
F	40	Bruce Overton	6 ft 8 in (2.03 m)	212 lb (96 kg)	Jr	Indianola	Indianola, IA
C	44	Marvin King	6 ft 7 in (2.01 m)	—	Sr		Missouri City, TX
F	50	Josh Donner	6 ft 8 in (2.03 m)	—	So	Lourdes Academy	Oshkosh, WI

Head coach

- Rudy Washington

Assistant coach(es)

Legend

- (C) Team captain
- (S) Suspended
- (I) Ineligible
- (W) Walk-on
- Injured
- Current redshirt

Roster

== Schedule and results ==
Date time, TV	Rank^{#}	Opponent^{#}	Result	Record	High points	High rebounds	High assists	Site (attendance) city, state
Non-conference regular season
Nov 29, 1994*		Iowa; Iowa Big Four	L 68–103	0–1	17 – Windhorst	13 – Overton	4 – Knuckey	Knapp Center; Des Moines, Iowa
Dec 3, 1994*		at Toledo	L 68–86	0–2	–	–	–	John F. Savage Hall; Toledo, Ohio
Dec 6, 1994*		at Iowa State; Iowa Big Four	L 69–94	0–3	–	–	–	Hilton Coliseum; Ames, Iowa
Dec 10, 1994*		UTSA	W 105–99	1–3	–	–	–	Knapp Center; Des Moines, Iowa
Dec 17, 1994		Tulsa	L 76–93	1–4 (0–1)	–	–	–	Knapp Center; Des Moines, Iowa
Dec 23, 1994*		Loyola–Chicago	L 60–72	1–5	–	–	–	Knapp Center; Des Moines, Iowa
Dec 29, 1994*		San Diego	W 99–98	2–5	–	–	–	Knapp Center; Des Moines, Iowa
Jan 2, 1995*		at Tulane	L 72–86	2–6	–	–	–	Avron B. Fogelman Arena; New Orleans, Louisiana
Jan 6, 1995*		Houston	W 85–65	3–6	–	–	–	Knapp Center; Des Moines, Iowa
MVC regular season
Jan 8, 1995		vs. Northern Iowa; Iowa Big Four / Rivalry	W 78–67	4–6 (1–1)	–	–	–	U.S. Cellular Center; Cedar Falls, Iowa
Jan 11, 1995		at Bradley	L 54–61	4–7 (1–2)	–	–	–	Carver Arena; Peoria, Illinois
Jan 15, 1995		Wichita State	W 69–46	5–7 (2–2)	–	–	–	Knapp Center; Des Moines, Iowa
Jan 18, 1995		at SW Missouri State	L 66–80	5–8 (2–3)	–	–	–	Hammons Student Center; Springfield, Missouri
Jan 23, 1995		Creighton	W 79–63	6–8 (3–3)	21 – Rogers	10 – Bennett	6 – Surla	Knapp Center; Des Moines, Iowa
Jan 26, 1995		Southern Illinois	L 68–89	6–9 (3–4)	17 – Rogers	10 – Bennett	3 – Surla	Knapp Center; Des Moines, Iowa
Jan 28, 1995		at Indiana State	W 83–77	7–9 (4–4)	–	–	–	Hulman Center; Terre Haute, Indiana
Jan 31, 1995		Bradley	L 55–73	7–10 (4–5)	–	–	–	Knapp Center; Des Moines, Iowa
Feb 2, 1995		at Creighton	W 78–74	8–10 (5–5)	28 – Windhorst	7 – Windhorst	4 – Surla	Omaha Civic Auditorium (4,018); Omaha, Nebraska
Feb 3, 1995		at Southern Illinois	L 74–79	8–11 (5–6)	26 – Rogers	13 – Maxey	3 – Tied	SIU Arena; Carbondale, Illinois
Feb 9, 1995		at Tulsa	W 60–53	9–11 (6–6)	–	–	–	Tulsa Convention Center; Tulsa, Oklahoma
Feb 11, 1995		at Wichita State	L 60–62	9–12 (6–7)	–	–	–	Levitt Arena; Wichita, Kansas
Feb 15, 1995		Illinois State	W 82–78	10–12 (7–7)	–	–	–	Knapp Center; Des Moines, Iowa
Feb 18, 1995		SW Missouri State	W 76–75	11–12 (8–7)	–	–	–	Knapp Center; Des Moines, Iowa
Feb 20, 1995		Evansville	L 72–86	11–13 (8–8)	–	–	–	Knapp Center; Des Moines, Iowa
Feb 25, 1995		Northern Iowa; Iowa Big Four / Rivalry	W 82–71	12–13 (9–8)	–	–	–	Knapp Center; Des Moines, Iowa
Feb 27, 1995		at Illinois State	L 64–66	12–14 (9–9)	–	–	–	Redbird Arena; Normal, Illinois
MVC Tournament
Mar 4, 1995*		vs. Southern Illinois; Quarterfinals	L 65–85	12–15	32 – Rogers	8 – Bennett	3 – Rogers	Kiel Center (11,971); St. Louis, Missouri
*Non-conference game. ^{#}Rankings from AP Poll. (#) Tournament seedings in parentheses. All times are in Central Time.
