= 2008–09 Drake Bulldogs men's basketball team =

American college basketball season

2008–09 Drake Bulldogs men's basketball

CIT First Round vs. Idaho, L, 67–69
- Conference: Missouri Valley Conference
- Record: 17–16 (7–11 MVC)
- Head coach: Mark Phelps
- Assistant coaches: Mike Gibson; Kareem Richardson; Justin Ohl
- Home arena: Knapp Center

2008–09 Missouri Valley Conference men's basketball standings
	Conf.				Overall
Team	W		L	PCT	W		L	PCT
Northern Iowa †	14	–	4	.778	23	–	11	.676
Creighton	14	–	4	.778	27	–	8	.771
Illinois State	11	–	7	.611	24	–	10	.706
Bradley	10	–	8	.556	21	–	15	.583
Southern Illinois	8	–	10	.444	13	–	18	.419
Evansville	8	–	10	.444	17	–	14	.548
Wichita State	8	–	10	.444	17	–	17	.500
Drake	7	–	11	.389	17	–	16	.515
Indiana State	7	–	11	.389	11	–	21	.344
Missouri State	3	–	15	.167	11	–	20	.355
† Missouri Valley Conference tournament winner As of April 1, 2009; Rankings from AP Poll

The 2008–09 Drake Bulldogs men's basketball team represented Drake University in the 2008-09 NCAA Division I men's basketball season. The team, which played in the Missouri Valley Conference (MVC), was led by first-year head coach Mark Phelps.

== Preseason ==
On April 21, 2008, Mark Phelps was named the head men's basketball coach at Drake University, succeeding Keno Davis.

Phelps will inherit a team that loses three starters—point guard Adam Emmenecker, shooting guard Leonard Houston, and small forward Klayton Korver. Emmenecker was one of the most compelling individual stories in the 2007–08 college season, going from three-year walk-on to MVC Player of the Year. Houston was a second-team all-MVC selection.

Returning starters are shooting guard Josh Young and power forward Jonathan "Bucky" Cox. Young, the team's leading scorer in 2007–08, joined Emmenecker on the all-MVC first team. Cox was the team's leading rebounder and joined Houston on the all-MVC second team.

== Regular season ==
Drake will host the Drake Iowa Realty Tournament on December 5–7, 2008 Drake will host the Drake Invitational on December 12–13, 2008. North Dakota State, Stephen F. Austin, and Texas-Pan American will be the participating schools. The January 28, 2009 game against Evansville was rescheduled as Evansville's plane was unable to take off due to weather. The game was scheduled to start at 7:05 p.m. CST.

== Roster ==
Note: Flags indicate national team eligibility at FIBA sanctioned events. Players may hold other non-FIBA nationality not displayed.

No.		Position	Player
2	(United States)	F	Alex White
3	(United States)	G	Craig Stanley
4	(United States)	F	Brent Heemskerk
5	(United States)	C	Sean Jones
10	(United States)	G	Ryan Wedel
11	(United States)	G	Jacob Baryenbruch
12	(Luxembourg)	G	Frank Wiseler
13	(United States)	G	Kit Avery
20	(United States)	G	Josh Young

No.		Position	Player
21	(United States)	F	Corey Parker
22	(United States)	F	Bill Eaddy
23	(United States)	G	Josh Parker
31	(United States)	F	Jonathan "Bucky" Cox
32	(United States)	F	Greg Whitaker
34	(United States)	F	Tyson "Dirty" Dirks
44	(United States)	G/F	Adam Templeton
50	(United States)	F	John Michael Hall

== Player statistics ==
Note: GP= Games played; MPG= Minutes per Game; SPG= Steals per Game; RPG = Rebounds per Game; APG. = Assists per Game; BPG = Blocks per Game; PPG = Points per Game

Player	GP	MPG	SPG	RPG	APG	BPG	PPG
Kit Avery	6	1.7	0.0	0.3	0.0	0.0	0.3
Jacob Baryenbruch	33	11.2	0.3	0.7	1.2	0.0	1.8
Johnathan Cox	33	33.0	0.9	8.5	0.9	0.8	12.5
Tyson Dirks	5	2.0	0.3	0.7	1.2	0.0	0.0
Bill Eaddy	33	9.7	0.2	1.0	0.3	0.0	2.1
John Michael Hall	30	9.6	0.7	1.0	0.9	0.1	2.9
Brent Heemskerk	33	19.6	0.8	4.4	0.5	0.8	3.9
Cory Parker	1	1.0	0.0	0.0	0.0	0.0	0.0
Josh Parker	33	22.1	0.8	2.0	1.5	0.1	10.7
Craig Stanley	33	29.1	0.7	1.8	0.1	0.1	7.9
Adam Templeton	33	23.2	0.6	3.8	0.9	0.2	5.5
Alex White	31	11.6	0.4	3.2	0.2	0.2	2.1
Josh Young	33	33.5	1.0	3.8	1.4	0.0	15.4

== Schedule ==
Missouri Valley Conference Standing: T-8th
Date	Opponent*	Rank*	Location	Time^{#}	Result	Overall	Conference
**Exhibition Games**
November 1, 2008	Truman State		Des Moines, IA	7:05 p.m.	W 77–61	1–0	0–0
November 9, 2008	Arkansas Tech		Des Moines, IA	2:05 p.m.	W 57–51	2–0	0–0
**Regular Season Games**
November 15, 2008	Butler		Des Moines, IA	7:05 p.m.	L 46–56	0–1	0–0
November 19, 2008	Morehead State		Des Moines, IA	7:05 p.m.	W 86–70	1–1	0–0
November 23, 2008	South Dakota State		Des Moines, IA	2:05 p.m.	W 75–65	2–1	0–0
November 29, 2008	Vanderbilt		Cancun, Mex.	7:30 p.m.	L 72–57	2–2	0–0
November 30, 2008	New Mexico		Cancun, Mex.	7:15 p.m.	W 68–62	3–2	0–0
December 3, 2008	Lincoln		Des Moines, IA	7:05 p.m.	W 75–50	4–2	0–0
December 5, 2008	Texas-Pan American		Des Moines, IA	7:30 p.m.	W 59–57	5–2	0–0
December 6, 2008	North Carolina Central		Des Moines, IA	7:30 p.m.	W 89–46	6–2	0–0
December 9, 2008	Iowa State		Ames, IA	7:05 p.m.	W 66–63	7–2	0–0
December 12, 2008	Georgia Southern		Des Moines, IA	7:30 p.m.	W 84–73	8–2	0–0
December 13, 2008	Stephen F. Austin		Des Moines, IA	7:30 p.m.	L 66–64	8–3	0–0
December 20, 2008	Iowa		Des Moines, IA	3:05 p.m.	W 60–43	9–3	0–0
December 28, 2008	**Evansville**		Evansville, IN	2:05 p.m.	L 76–65	9–4	0–1
December 31, 2008	**Missouri State**		Des Moines, IA	2:00 p.m.	W 67–49	10–4	1–1
January 4, 2009	**Southern Illinois**		Carbondale, IL	6:00 p.m.	W 67–60	11–4	2–1
January 7, 2009	**Indiana State**		Des Moines, IA	7:05 p.m.	W 69–50	12–4	3–1
January 11, 2009	**Wichita State**		Des Moines, IA	6:00 p.m.	W 74–69	13–4	4–1
January 14, 2009	**Illinois State**		Normal, IL	7:05 p.m.	L 65–61	13–5	4–2
January 17, 2009	**Northern Iowa**		Des Moines, IA	11:05 a.m.	L 81–59	13–6	4–3
January 21, 2009	**Missouri State**		Springfield, MO	7:05 p.m.	L 65–44	13–7	4–4
January 24, 2009	**Creighton**		Omaha, NE	1:00 p.m.	W 74–62	14–7	5–4
January 29, 2009	**Evansville**		Des Moines, IA	4:00 p.m.	L 65–62	14–8	5–5
January 31, 2009	**Wichita State**		Wichita, KS	7:05 p.m.	L 63–49	14–9	5–6
February 4, 2009	**Creighton**		Des Moines, IA	1:00 p.m.	L 79–68	14–10	5–7
February 7, 2009	**Bradley**		Des Moines, IA	7:05 p.m.	W 68–54	15–10	6–7
February 11, 2009	**Indiana State**		Terre Haute, IN	6:05 p.m.	L 69–57	15–11	6–8
February 15, 2009	**Illinois State**		Des Moines, IA	6:05 p.m.	L 67–45	15–12	6–9
February 18, 2009	**Northern Iowa**		Cedar Falls, IA	7:05 p.m.	W 47–46	16–12	7–9
February 21, 2009	Austin Peay		Des Moines, IA	7:05 p.m.	W 71–54	17–12	7–9
February 25, 2009	**Southern Illinois**		Des Moines, IA	7:35 p.m.	L 56–55	17–13	7–10
February 28, 2009	**Bradley**		Peoria, IL	7:05 p.m.	L 77–75	17–14	7–11
**Missouri Valley Conference tournament**
March 5, 2009	Indiana State		St. Louis, MO	6:05 p.m.	L 62–55	17–15	7–11
**CollegeInsider.com Tournament**
March 18, 2009	Idaho		Moscow, ID	10:05 p.m.	L 69–67	17–16	7–11
*Rank according to ESPN/USA Today Coaches Poll. ^{#}All times are in CST. Conference games in **BOLD**.
